= List of closed rides and attractions =

The following are amusement park rides and attractions that have been closed. In some cases they may have been removed and replaced by another ride, while in other cases they may be standing but not operating.

== Cedar Fair ==
=== Geauga Lake ===
- The dry side of the Geauga Lake amusement park closed after its last operating day of the 2007 season, September 16, 2007. Cedar Fair relocated or auctioned off most of the park's roller coasters and flat rides. Geauga Lake's water park, Wildwater Kingdom closed after its 2016 season as the last amusement park on Geauga Lake.

== Compagnie des Alpes ==
=== Bellewaerde ===
- Dancing Queen (1989–2004)
- Enterprise (1981–1986)
- Los Piratas (pirate-themed dark ride, 1991–2012)
- Monorail (1983–2007)
- Octopus (1980–2007)
- Oldtimers (vintage car ride, 1981–2009)

=== Jardin d'Acclimatation ===
- Chenille (Powered Coaster from Soquet, 1992–2001)
- Chenille (Powered Coaster, 2010–2017)

=== Parc Astérix ===
- Ronde des Rondins (Tivoli from Zierer, 1989–2013)

=== Walibi Belgium ===
- Bounty (Looping Starship, 1993–2002)
- Big Yoyo (Paratower, 1981–1998)
- Coccinelle (Tivoli from Zierer, 1999–2017)
- Grand 8 (Z47 from Pinfari, 1975–1983)
- Inferno (Enterprise, 1975–2010)
- Jumbo Jet (Jet Star III from Schwarzkopf, 1978–1991)
- La Grande Roue (Ferris wheel, 1979–2016)
- Tornado (Corkscrew with Bayerncurve from Vekoma, 1979–2002)
- Vertigo (Mountain Glider from Doppelmayr, 2007–2008)

=== Walibi Holland ===
- Aztek (Rainbow, 2000–2008)
- Boris Klauter Island (playground, 2005–2010)
- Double Inverter (Looping Starship, 2000–2004, now in Walibi Rhône-Alpes)
- El Toro (Breakdance, 2000–2005, since 2006 in Bellewaerde)
- Flying Dutchman Goldmine (Wild Mouse from Mack Rides, 2000–2010, now in La Mer de Sable)
- Hudson Bay (Pirate ship, 1994–2015)
- Kids Playground (playground, 2005–2013)
- Robin Hood (wooden roller coaster from Vekoma, 2000–2018)
- Safari (1982–1999)
- Sherwood's Revenge (Tri Star, 1994–2006, since 2007 in La Mer de Sable)
- Tornado (roller coaster from Chance Rides, 2000–2004, now in Walygator Sud-Ouest)
- Waikiki Wave (Waikiki Wave Super Flip, 1995–1999)

== Looping Group ==
=== Avonturenpark Hellendoorn ===
- Autoscooters (Dodgems, 1970–1988) (replaced by the Broadway Theater)
- Avonturenslang (roller coaster from Zierer, from 2005–2013 at DippieDoe) (replaced by Donderstenen)
- Ballon Kanon (playground, 2006–2010) (replaced by Baba's Bungee)
- Black Hole (Jet Star from Schwarzkopf, 1986–1990)
- Casa Rotativa (Madhouse, 1980–2001)
- Doolhof (maze, 1949–2012)
- Gold Wash (gold digging attraction, 1981–2002)
- Jungle Rock (Round-Up, 1998–2005, since 2006 at Fort Fun Abenteuerland) (replaced by Tarantula Magica)
- Midgetgolf (miniature golf, 1970–1990) (replaced by Speeltuin)
- Moby Dick (seastorm ride, 1994–2012) (replaced by Slidepark Aquaventura)
- Montezuma's Revenge (Top Spin, 1998–2021)
- Notenkraker (Octopus, 1987–1997) (replaced by Montezuma's Revenge)
- Rioolrat 1 (steel roller coaster from Zierer, 1991–1995, from 1996–1999 at Spielerei Rheda-Wiedenbrück)
- Speelkasteel (playground, 1988–2013) (replaced by Bella's Swing Paleis)
- Sprookjestuin (Fairytale forest, 1956–1989) (replaced by Tornado)

=== Drayton Manor Theme Park ===
- Arriva Crazy Bus (1998–2007)
- Balloon Race (1987–1997) (replaced by Mini Balloons)
- Big Wheel (Ferris wheel, 1986–2017, now at Billing Aquadrome)
- Black Revolver (waltzer, 1980–2010, now at Rainbow Park, Hunstanton) (replaced by Air Race)
- Cadbury's Junior Pirate Ship (1986–2007, later at Funland Hayling Island)
- Chair lift (1964–2017)
- Cine 180 (180 degree cinema, 1985–2003)
- Cleo (junior magic carpet, 1986–1997)
- Cyclone (Enterprise, 2003–2005, now at Thorpe Park)
- Dodgems (1952–1989)
- Drayton Queen (boat ride, 1992–2016)
- Excalibur (tow boat ride, 2003–2011)
- Flying Jumbos (Dumbo, 1998–2007)
- Frog Hopper (mini drop tower, 1998–2007, now at Funland Hayling Island)
- Giant Slide (fun slide, 1985–2002)
- G Force (X-Car steel roller coaster from Maurer Rides, 2005–2018)
- Haunted Crypt (ghost train, 1970s–2001)
- Jolly Roger (Rockin' Tug, 2004–2007) (rethemed to Bulstrode)
- Jumbo Jet (City Jet from Schwarzkopf, 1981–1983) (replaced by Python Looping Coaster)
- Junior Carousel (1986–2007)
- Junior Combat Star (1986–1997)
- Kiddie Concorde Jets (1986–1997)
- Klondike Gold Mine (Zyklon from Pinfari, 1995–2004, from 2005–2015 at Funland Hayling Island) (replaced by G Force)
- Ladybirds (Carousel, 1986–2007)
- Log Flume (1981–1998, parts now at Flamingo Land) (replaced by Stormforce 10)
- Lunar Carousel (1986–2007)
- Mini Balloons (Samba Balloon, 1998–2007)
- Mississippi Showboat (funhouse, 1988–1994)
- Octopus (1984–1997)
- Paratower (1982–1997, later at Pleasure Island Family Theme Park)
- Pirate Adventure (water dark ride, 1990–2015)
- Pirate Raft Ride (Red Baron, 1998–2007, now at Great Yarmouth Pleasure Beach)
- Pirate Ship (1982–2003) (replaced by G Force)
- Python Looping Coaster (ZL42 from Pinfari, 1985–1994)
- Quasar (1985–1987)
- Red Baron (1986–1997)
- Roller Coaster (roller coaster from Lakin, 1960s–1983) (replaced by Super Dragon)
- Rowing Boats (1950 – c. 1997)
- Sky Flyer (1989–2003) (rethemed to Pandemonium)
- Snake Train (1950–1995)
- Sombrero (Octopus, 1998–2010)
- Super Dragon (Big Apple from Pinfari, 1984–2007, now at Funland Hayling Island)
- Tea Cups (1988–2004, now at Adventure Wonderland) (replaced by G Force)
- VertiGo (Adventure park, 2016–2019)
- Waltzer (1965–1979) (replaced by Black Revolver)
- Whirly Copters (Ferris wheel for children, 1998–2007, later at Funland Hayling Island)

=== Fort Fun Abenteuerland ===
- Crazy Washhouse (funhouse, 2001–2014)
- Fliegender Teppich (Magic carpet, 1989–1999)
- La Bostella (Calypso, 1986–1992)
- Monster (Octopus, 1998–2004)
- Mystery Warehouse (ghost train, 2001–2012) (rethemed to Secret Stage of Horror)
- Pirat (Pirate ship, 1989–2013)
- Power Slide (Summer toboggan, 1972–2003)
- Roll Over (1996–2005)
- Secret Stage of Horror (ghost train, 2012–2018)
- Silent Move (Monorail, 1986–2007)
- Silver Mine (steel roller coaster from Zierer, 2000–2017)
- Spider (Octopus, 1986–1997)
- Tomahawk (Tornado, 1999–2013)
- Troika (1989–1995)
- Yukan Raft (Top Spin, 2013–2019)

=== La Mer de Sable ===
- Dragon de Bei Hai (junior Coaster from Cavazza Diego, 1990–2006)
- Train du Colorado (Powered coaster from Soquet, 2000–2009)

=== Parc Bagatelle ===
- Coleoz'Arbres (Jet Star from Schwarzkopf, 1994–2007)

== Merlin Entertainments Group ==
=== Alton Towers ===
- 1001 Nights (Magic Carpet, 1985–1994)
- 4 Man Bob Coaster (1985–1990)
- Adventure Playground (1974–1993)
- Adventure Railway (Miniature railway, 1982–1992)
- Alpine Bobsleigh (summer toboggan, 1980–1986)
- Alton Mouse (1988–1991, since 1993 in Idlewild and Soak Zone)
- Aquarium (1974–1994)
- Around The World in 80 Days (water dark ride, 1981–1993)
- Astroglide (Wavy slide, mid–1970s–1992)
- Barney's Playground (2000–2002)
- Black Hole (Enclosed roller coaster from Schwarzkopf, 1984–2005, since 2011 in Furuvik Zoo)
- Boneshaker (Supernova, 1995–2003)
- Bouncing Bugs (Red Baron, 1982–2008)
- Cable Cars (Aerial lift, 1964–1986)
- Charlie and the Chocolate Factory: The Ride (water dark ride, 2006–2015)
- Cine 2000 (180° cinema, 1980–1992)
- Cine 360 (360° cinema, 1981–1987)
- Corkscrew (Corkscrew with Bayerncurve from Vekoma and Arrow Dynamics, 1980–2008)
- Cred Street Carousel (merry-go-round, 2000–2005)
- Cred Street Playground (playground, 2006–2008)
- Dinosaurs (1980–1983)
- Doll's House (1981–1995)
- Doom & Sons (Haunted house, 1981–1991)
- Dynamo (Breakdance, 1993–2003)
- Ferris wheel (1985–1986)
- Gravitron (1990–1992)
- Magic Carpet (1984–1985)
- Mini Apple Coaster (1982–1997, since 1998 at Great Yarmouth Pleasure Beach)
- Miniature Golf (1980–1994)
- Model Railway (1957–1992)
- Motor Museum (1987–1992)
- Nickelodeon: Outta Control (1997–1998)
- Nina's Science Lab (2014–2018)
- Octopus (1984–1991)
- Old MacDonald's Singing Barn (1995–2013)
- Old MacDonald's Tractor Ride (1995–2013)
- Park Railway (1953–1996)
- Pirate Ship (1980–1996) (rethemed to The Blade)
- Planetarium (1972–1987)
- Ripsaw (Top Spin, 1997–2015)
- Rowing Boats (1923–1996)
- Space Boat (Looping Starship, 1983–1983)
- Spider (1986–1991)
- Splash Cats (1966–1996)
- Splash Kart Challenge (2004–2007)
- Submission (Inverter, 2001–2013)
- Sunliner Trains (1984–1986)
- Swan Boats (Paddle boats, 1987–2003)
- Tea Cup Ride (1986–2007)
- The Beast (1988–1997, since 2010 in Salitre Mágico)
- The Beastie (family roller coaster from Pinfari, 1983–2010, now at Barry Island Pleasure Park)
- The Blue Carousel (1981–1991)
- The Flume (Log flume, 1981–2015)
- Thunder Looper (Shuttle Loop from Schwarzkopf, 1990–1996, since 1999 at Hopi Hari)
- Thunderbirds (1982–1990)
- Towers Express (1974–1983)
- Toyland Tours (water dark ride, 1994–2005)
- Tri-Star (1989–1992)
- Turbo Star (Tri-Star, 1984–1989)
- Tweenies Playground (2003–2005)
- Twirling Toadstool (Wave swinger, 1984–2016)
- Vintage Cars (1983–2005)
- Wobble World (Inflatable castles, 2009–2015)

=== Chessington World of Adventures ===
- Bash Street Bus (Crazy Bus, 2001–2009) (rethemed to Jungle Bus)
- Billy's Whizzer (Wave swinger, 2000–2009) (rethemed to Monkey Swinger)
- Black Buccaneer (Pirate ship, 1988–2018) (replaced by Blue Barnacle)
- Bubbleworks (water dark ride, 1990–2016) (rethemed to The Gruffalo River Ride Adventure)
- Carousel (1996–2016) (replaced by The Chessington Adventure Tree)
- Chessington Railroad (Narrow-gauge railway, 1987–1996)
- Dennis's Madhouse (indoor playground, 2002–2009) (rethemed to Temple of Mayhem)
- Dragon River (log flume, 1987–2017) (rethemed to Tiger Rock)
- Hocus Pocus Hall (house of mirrors, 2003–2018) (rethemed to Room on the Broom — A Magical Journey)
- Magic Carpet (1988–1998) (replaced by Samurai)
- Old Crooks Railroad (kids track ride, 1987–2000) (rethemed to Toadies Crazy Cars)
- Peeking Heights (Ferris wheel, 2005–2017)
- Rameses Revenge (Top Spin, 1995–2019) (replaced by Croc Drop)
- Rodeo (Breakdance, 1994–2004)
- Roger the Dodger's Dodgems (2000–2009) (rethemed to Tuk Tuk Turmoil)
- Runaway Train (Powered coaster from Mack Rides, 1987–2012) (rethemed to Scorpion Express)
- Safari Skyway (Monorail, 1986–2015)
- Samurai (Top Scan, 1999–2003, since 2003 at Thorpe Park)
- Terror Tomb (dark ride, 1994–2001) (rethemed to Tomb Blaster)
- The Fifth Dimension (dark ride, 1987–1993) (rethemed to Terror Tomb)
- Toadies Crazy Cars (kids track ride, 2001–2019) (replaced by Jungle Rangers)
- Toytown Roundabout (Carousel, 1996–1999)

=== Gardaland ===
- Aster Line Saturno 7 (Simulator ride, 1978–1994) (replaced by Space Lab)
- Baby Carousel (Merry-go-round, 1998–2000)
- Calci (Wave Swinger, 1989–1994) (replaced by Baby Carousel)
- Canyons (Western-themed dark ride, 1975–2008) (replaced by Canyon Creek)
- Castello di Dracula (Haunted attraction, 1982–1994) (replaced by Castello di Mago Merlin)
- Castello di Mago Merlino (Walkthrough, 1995–2000)
- Convention Center (Walkthrough, 1995–2009) (replaced by Inferis: il labirinto del terrore)
- Crazy House (Haunted attraction, 1979–1981) (replaced by Castello del Conte Dracula)
- Giostra Baby (Carousel, 1975–1988)
- Giostra Cavalli (Merry-go-round, 1975–1981)
- Ikarus (Condor, 1989–2011, since 2012 at Miragica)
- Il corpo di Eva (Walkthrough, 1988–1994)
- Il Villaggio degli Elfi (vintage car ride, 1990–2000) (replaced by Funny Express)
- Inferis: il labirinto del terrore (Haunted attraction, 2010–2011) (replaced by Oblivion: The Black Hole)
- La Valle dei Re (Egyptian-themed dark ride, 1987–2008) (replaced by Ramses: Il Risveglio)
- Labirinto Giapponese (maze, 1975–1988)
- Mini Treno (train ride, 1975–1980) (replaced by Panoramic Tour)
- Moonraker (Wipeout, 1993–2000) (replaced by Toys Shop e Teatro delle Marionette)
- Nuvola (Rainbow, 1988–2001)
- Padiglione Barbie (Museum, 1994–1996) (replaced by Arena Medievale)
- Panoramic Tour (Aerial lift, 1982–2006) (replaced by Inferis: il labirinto del terrore)
- Prezzemolo Baby Fun (Carousel, 2000–2002) (replaced by Games Area)
- Prezzemolo Tour (roller coaster from Montagna Russa, 1986–1989) (replaced by Ortobruco Tour)
- Ruota Panoramica (Ferris wheel, 1986–1992) (replaced by Top Spin)
- Safari Africano (water dark ride, 1975–1998) (rethemed to Tunga)
- Space Lab (Simulator ride, 1995–2000) (replaced by the area Fantasy Kingdom)
- Top Spin (1993–2014) (replaced by Kung Fu Panda Academy)
- Tunga (water dark ride, 1999–2010) (replaced by Raptor)
- UFO (Wipeout, 1975–1992) (replaced by Moonraker)
- Villaggio a fumetti (vintage car ride, 1975–1989) (rethemed to Il Villaggio degli Elfi)
- Zyclone (roller coaster from Schwarzkopf, 1980–1984)

=== Heide Park ===
- Aqua Spin (Top Spin, 1992–2017)
- Aussichtsturm II (Gyro tower, 1992–2002) (replaced by Scream)
- Ballspritzen (water playground, 1988–2011)
- Bungee Trampolin (Bungee trampoline, 2004-?)
- Colossos (2001–2017) (wooden roller coaster from Intamin, rethemed to Colossos - Kampf der Giganten)
- Condor (1989–2008, since 2009 at Skyline Park)
- El Sol (Enterprise, 1990–2017, now at Baghdad Island Amusement Park)
- Fernlenkboote (remote-controlled boats, 1978-?)
- Goldschürfen (gold digging attraction, 2008-?)
- Heide-Dorf Spielplatz (playground, 1997–2009)
- Hully-Gully (Wipeout, 1996–2009)
- Huracan (Round-Up, 1983–2018)
- Indianer Kletterpfad im Holiday-Camp (Adventure park, 2014–2016)
- Kaffeetassen-Karussell (Tea Cups, 1985–2009, since 2013 at Śląskie Wesołe Miasteczko)
- Kanalfahrt (boat ride, 1991–2015) (rethemed to Drachengrotte)
- Kids Kanu (canoe ride for children, 1997–2011, now at Schwabenpark)
- Kids Kutter (boat ride for children, 1997–2011)
- Kinderlok Old'99 (train ride for children, 1985–2009)
- Koggenfahrt (seastorm ride, 1982–2017, now at Daftöland) (replaced by the area Peppa Pig Land)
- Lady Moon (Flipper, 1990–2017, since 2018 at Baghdad Island Amusement Park)
- Märchenfahrt (fairytale-themed boat ride, 1991–2015, boats and decoration now at Schwabenpark) (replaced by the area Drachenzähmen: Die Insel)
- Monza-Piste (kids track ride, 1978–2011)
- Okti (Octopus, 1982–2017)
- Pferdekarussell Alt Wien (Merry-go-round, 1983–2008, since 2010 at Freizeitpark Plohn)
- Ponyreiten (pony ride, 1978–1982)
- Rainbow (1992–2008, since 2015 at Magic Park Land)
- Roter Baron (Red baron, 1985–2015) (rethemed to Grobians Wolkenspringer)
- Santa-Maria (pirate ship, 1983–2009, since 2010 in Legoland Windsor Resort)
- Spielplatz I (playground, 1978–1990)
- Spielplatz I (playground, 1992–2014)
- Wasserspielplatz (water playground, 1992–2011)
- Wichtelhausenbahn (dark ride, 1978–2017)
- Wikingerfahrt (water carousel, 2000–2003, since 2004 at Chessington World of Adventures)
- Wildwasserbahn II (log flume, 1990–2011) (replaced by Flug der Dämonen)

=== Legoland Billund Resort ===
- DUPLO Driving School (kids track ride)
- Mine Train (Western-themed dark ride, ?–2013)
- Pirate Mini Water Falls (water playground)
- Pirate Water Falls (water playground)
- Timber Ride (steel roller coaster) (replaced by The Eagle)

=== Legoland California ===
- Aquazone Wave Racers (Dual Water Carousel from Zierer, 2000–2020) (replaced by Ninjago Training Camp)
- Enchanted Walk (Animal models built with LEGO bricks, 2005–2018) (replaced by LEGO City: Deep Sea Adventure)
- Flight Squadron (Red Baron, 1999–2017) (replaced by Riptide Racers)
- Knights Tournament (KUKA Robocoaster, 2005–2019)
- Miniland Florida (Florida-themed section of Miniland, 2004–2011) (replaced by Star Wars Miniland)
- Sky Cruiser (Pedal-powered track ride, 1999–2016)
- Spellbreaker (Suspended roller coaster from Caripro, 2000–2003)
- Treasure Falls (log flume, 2006–2016)
- Water Works (Pressure-activated musical fountain, 1999–2015) (replaced by Heartlake Fountain)
- Wild Woods Golf (miniature golf, 2005–2018) (replaced by LEGO City: Deep Sea Adventure)

=== Legoland Deutschland Resort ===
- LEGO Drome Racers (Dodgems racing, 2002–2007)

=== Legoland Discovery Center Dallas Fort Worth ===
- LEGO City Play Zone & Fire Academy (indoor playground) (replaced by Ninjago Training Camp)
- LEGO Girls Princess Palace (Workshop)

=== Legoland Malaysia Resort ===
- Project X (Wild mouse from Mack Rides, 2012–2017) (replaced by The Great LEGO Race)

=== Legoland Windsor Resort ===
- Atlantis Submarine Voyage (dark ride inside a submarine, 2011–2019) (rethemed to LEGO City: Deep Sea Adventure)
- Bum Shaker (Hand-pump on-track cart ride, 1996–2000) (replaced by the picnic area The Truck Stop)
- Dino Safari (vintage car ride, 2005–2015) (replaced by the LEGO Castle Hotel)
- Discovery Zone featuring Mindstorms (Workshop)
- Explorer's Institute (Walkthrough, 1996–2008)
- Jungle Coaster (wild mouse from Mack Rides, 2004–2009, since 2011 at Legoland Florida) (replaced by the Legoland Hotel)
- Magic Theatre (1996–2007)
- Mole-in-One Mini Golf (Miniature golf, 2007–2013) (replaced by Drench Tower)
- Muscle Maker (Hand-pump on-track cart ride, 1996–2003) (replaced by the picnic area The Truck Stop)

=== Sea Life Abenteuer Park (1996–2015) ===
- Bee Bee (Carousel, 2001–2010)
- Benjamin Blümchens Wellenflieger (Wave swinger, 2005–2010)
- Drachenflug (Carousel, 2001–2003)
- Hip & Hop (mini drop tower, 2014–2017)
- Jeep Safari (kids track ride, 2014–2017)
- MS Seegang (Rockin' Tug, 2014–2017)
- Oldtimerfahrt (vintage car ride, 2008–2010)
- Pinguine! Abenteuer Antarktis (log flume, 2013–2015)
- Piratenflotte (Splash Battle, 2006–2010)
- Power-Paddler-Boote (Bumper boats)
- Regenbogen-Riesenrad (Ferris wheel, 2001–2010)
- Rodeo (Breakdance, 2001–2010)
- Rutschenturm (Slides, 1997-?)
- Shanghai-Express (Miniature train, 1996-?)
- Speedy (Spinning coaster, 2001–2010)
- Traktor-Bahn (Tractor ride, 1996–2017)
- Wasserspielplatz (water playground, 2014–2017)

== Overseas Chinese Town Enterprises ==
=== Happy Valley Beijing ===
- Harvest Time (Spinning Coaster from Zhongshan Golden Horse, 2006–2014)

== Parques Reunidos ==
=== Attractiepark Slagharen ===
- Autoscooter (Dodgems) (replaced by Dream Catcher)
- Dream Catcher (Magic carpet, 1996–2012) (replaced by Flying Cloud)
- Flying Cloud (Looping Starship, 1984–2014) (replaced by Fogg's Trouble)
- Keverbaan (Tivoli from Zierer, 1976–2000) (replaced by Mine Train)
- Kleine Monorail (1970–1978) (station replaced for a new entrance)
- Lachspiegels (Distorting mirrors)
- Nautilus (dark ride, 1968–2012)
- Rocky Mountain Springs (Swimming pool, 1987–2014) (replaced by Aqua Mexicana)
- Rodeo Rider (Calypso, 1979–2012) (replaced by Expedition Nautilus)
- Thunder Loop (Looping Star from Schwarzkopf, 1979–2016) (replaced by Gold Rush)
- Zeppelin (Condor-like ride, 1975–1998) (replaced by the Sky Tower)

=== Bobbejaanland ===
==== Roller coasters ====
- Achtbaan (Wildcat from Schwarzkopf, 1976–1981)
- Alpenblitz (Powered coaster from Schwarzkopf (1976–1981)
- Looping Star (Looping Star from Schwarzkopf, 1979–2003)
- Speedy Bob (Wild mouse from Mack Rides, 1998–2008)
- Wervelwind (Whirlwind from Vekoma, 1982–1999)

==== Other attractions ====
- Astroliner (Simulator ride)
- Autoracebaan
- Autoscooter (Dodgems)
- Balloon Race
- Bobby Drop (Water slide, 1999–2008, since 2009 in La Récré des 3 Curés)
- Breakdance
- Calypso (Carousel)
- Condor
- Cowboy Express (Music Express)
- Desperado City (Western-themed interactive dark ride, 2006–2012)
- Dino Ride (Teacup-like carousel, ?–2019) (replaced by Fury)
- Draaiend Huis (Madhouse)
- Fly Away (Enterprise, 2003–2014, since 2016 at La Récré des 3 Curés)
- Funny Barrels
- Helicoptermolen
- Jommekesland
- Kettingzwiermolen (Swing ride)
- Kleine Monorail
- Mambo (Music Express, 2000–2010, since 2011 in La Récré des 3 Curés)
- Mississippiboot (Ship ride)
- Mystery Hotel (Haunted house ride, 1985–1996)
- Old timers (vintage car ride)
- Paardenmolen (Merry-go-round)
- Parachute Tower (Paratower, 1982–1996)
- Rainbow
- Red Baron 1
- Robinson Speeltuin
- Santa Maria (Pirate ship, 1979–2007)
- Texastrein (Train ride, 1976–2000)
- Tonnenbaan
- Trap
- Trapeze Tower
- Troika
- Vicking Ride (water carousel, ?–2019) (replaced by Fury)
- Watership (water slide)
- Zwemvijvers (Swimming pool)

=== Castle Park ===
- Cyclone Racer (Music Express)
- Falling Star (Magic carpet)
- Ferris Wheel
- Go Karts (replaced by Screamin' Demon)
- Thunderbolt
- Tornado Coaster (Powered coaster from Zamperla)
- Trabant

=== Dutch Wonderland ===
- Astroliner (Simulator ride, 1978–2020)
- Crazy Plane (Crazy Plane, 1994–2014) (replaced by Bon Voyage Balloon Chase)
- Ferris Windmill (Ferris wheel for children, 1981–2012) (replaced by Exploration Island)
- Giant Slide (slide, 1968–2007) (replaced by two other slides)
- Gliding Swans (Miniature train, 1965–1967)
- Lady Gay Riverboat (1963–2016)
- Old 99 (train ride, 1974–2002)
- Original Iron Horse Train (Miniature railway, 1963–1985)
- Ripcord (Paratrooper, 1990–2010)
- Silo slide (Slide, 1963–2015)
- Swan Boats (Pedalos, 1968–1974) (replaced by Dragon's Lair)
- Tug Boat (Riverboat, 1967–2016)
- Turnpike Cars 1.0 (vintage car ride, 1963–2013) (replaced by Merlin's Mayhem)
- VR Voyager (Simulator ride, ?–2020)
- Wally the Whale Boats (Pedalos, 1963–1967) (replaced by the Swan Boats)
- Wiggle Racers (A ride where self-propelled scooters race around a track)

=== Kennywood ===
- 13 Spook Street (Walkthrough, 1937–1940)
- Bayern Kurve (1994–2004/2009–2020)
- Caterpillar (1923–1945)
- Caterpillar (1969–1982)
- Daffy Klub (Walkthrough, 1941–1955)
- Dipper (1948–1984)
- Dodgem (1922–1929)
- Flying Carpet (Magic carpet, 1988–2006)
- Gee Whizz Dip the Dips (wooden roller coaster from Frederick Ingersoll, 1900–1921)
- Ghost Ship (dark ride, opened 1967, burned down 1975)
- Gold Rusher (dark ride, 1981–2007)
- Kenny's Parkway (Chairlift, 1996–2020, now at Woods Valley Ski Area)
- King Kahuna (Top Spin, 2003–2009)
- Laff-in-the-Dark (dark ride, 1930–1965)
- Laser Loop (Shuttle Loop from Schwarzkopf, 1980–1990)
- Le Cachot (dark ride, 1972–1998, cars now in Bushkill Park)
- Log Jammer (log flume, 1975–2017)
- Monongahela Monster (Monster, 1979–1989)
- Orbiter (mini Enterprise, 1982–2020)
- Paratrooper (1976–2020)
- Pitt Fall (Drop tower, 1997–2011) (replaced by Black Widow)
- Pounce Bounce (junior drop tower, 2002–2019)
- Ranger (1983–1983)
- Roll-O-Plane (1950–2003)
- Rotor (1965–1973/1988–1994)
- Row Boats (Pedalos, 1899–1980)
- Safari (dark ride, 1961–1971) (rethemed to Le Cachot)
- Scenic Railway (roller coaster from Frederick Ingersoll & John A. Miller, 1905–1910)
- Speed-O-Plane (roller coaster from Frederick Ingersoll, 1911–1923)
- Steeplechase (Steeplechase coaster, 1903–1904)
- Swing Around (1989–2005)
- Teddy Bear (junior wooden roller coaster from Philadelphia Toboggan Coasters, 1935–1947)
- Tornado (dark ride, 1963–1966)
- Tri-Star (1992–1992)
- Turnpike (vintage car ride, 1966–2009)
- Twin Ferris Wheel (1959–1969)
- Volcano (Enterprise, 1978–2020)
- WipeOut (1993–2008, later at Lake Compounce (2009–2020))
- Wonder Wheel (Ferris wheel, 1986–1999)
- Zoomerang (dark ride, 1954–1960) (rethemed to Safari)

=== Lake Compounce ===
- Arctic Express (mini Music Express, ?–2008) (replaced by Jolly Jester)
- Caterpillar Train (train ride, 1997–2020)
- Enterprise (1986–2015) (replaced by Phobia Phear Coaster)
- Gillette Railway (Miniature train, 1943–1997) (replaced by C.P. Huntington Train)
- Green Dragon (wooden roller coaster, 1914–1926) (replaced by Wildcat)
- Lake Plunge (Tube slide, 1999–2011) (replaced by Riptide Racer)
- Mark Twain (Pedalo, 1999–2007) (replaced by Compounce Cabana Boat)
- Miniature Golf Course (1959–2004) (replaced by the area Anchor Bay)
- Musik Express (1985–2008) (replaced by Wipeout)
- Paddle Boats (1985–2005) (replaced by Compounce Cabana Boat)
- Roll in the Dark (Enclosed roller coaster, 1979–1982)
- Rotor (1997–2010) (replaced by Rev-O-Lution)
- Swan Boats (Pedalos, 2005–2007) (replaced by Compounce Cabana Boat)
- The Sky Ride (Chairlift, 1997–2017)
- Top Spin (1997–2002, since 2003 in Kennywood) (replaced by American Flyers)
- Tornado (Scrambler, 1975–1999) (replaced by Twister)
- Twister Sisters (Slides, 1985–2007) (replaced by Tunnel Twisters)
- Wipeout (2009–2020) (replaced by an entertainment stage)

=== Mirabilandia ===
- Family Adventure (Junior Coaster from Vekoma, 2001–2011)
- GhostVille (dark ride, 2006–2011)
- Il Bruco Magico (Big Apple, 1998–2000)
- Katapult (Katapult from Schwarzkopf, 2006–2006)
- Sierra Tonante (wooden roller coaster from William Cobb & Associates, 1992–2007)

=== Movie Park Germany ===
==== Roller coasters ====
- Cop Car Chase (Dueling coaster from Intamin, 2005–2006) (replaced by Star Trek: Operation Enterprise)
- Coyote's und Roadrunner's Achterbahn (Junior Coaster from Vekoma, 1996–2004) (rethemed to Rocket Rider Rollercoaster)
- Lethal Weapon Pursuit (Dueling coaster from Intamin, 1996–2004) (rethemed to Cop Car Chase)
- Mad Manor (wild mouse from Mack Rides, 2005–2007) (rethemed to Ghost Chasers)
- MP-Xpress (SLC from Vekoma, 2001–2020) (rethemed to Lucky Luke – The Ride: Die Daltons brechen aus)
- Rocket Rider Rollercoaster (junior Coaster from Vekoma, 2005–2007) (rethemed to Backyardigans: Mission to Mars)
- Tom and Jerry's Mouse in the House (wild mouse from Mack Rides, 2000–2005) (rethemed to Mad Manor)
- Wild Wild West (wooden roller coaster from Roller Coaster Corporation of America, 1999–2004) (rethemed to Bandit)

==== Other attractions ====
- Batman Abenteuer (Simulator ride, 1996–2004) (rethemed to Time Riders)
- Blue's Skidoo (Red Baron, 2008–2018)
- Brandy Bird's Hat Dance (carousel, 2005–2007)
- Danny Phantom Ghost Zone (Teacups, 2007–2012) (rethemed to Fairy World Spin)
- Diego's Rescue Rider (Jump Around, 2008–2018)
- Dishwasher (Teacups, 2005–2006) (rethemed to Danny Phantom Ghost Zone)
- Dora's Adventure Express (train ride, 2007–2013)
- Elmer Fudd's Tractor Race (Tractor ride, 1996–2004) (rethemed to Robert's Rat Race)
- Filmmuseum (Museum with original artefacts from famous films like Star Wars and Terminator, 1996–2013) (replaced by Star Trek: Operation Enterprise)
- Film Studio Tour (1996–2007)
- Flying Cloud (Crazy Bus, 2005–2006) (rethemed to Teenage Robot Roundabout)
- Gremlins Invasion (dark ride themed to Gremlins, 1996–2005) (replaced by Van Helsing's Factory)
- Ice Age Adventure (water dark ride, 2005–2016) (replaced by Movie Park Studio Tour)
- Josie's Bath House (Breakdance, 2000–2007)
- Looney Tunes Adventure (water dark ride, 1996–2004) (rethemed to Ice Age Adventure)
- Looney Tunes Carousel (Carousel, 1996–2004) (rethemed to Movie Crew Carousel)
- Looney Tunes Tea Cup Ride (Teacups, 1996–2004) (rethemed to Dishwasher)
- Movie Crew Carousel (Carousel, 2005–2007)
- Mister Valentinos Go Kart Race (Kart racing, 2005–2006) (rethemed to NICK Speed Racers)
- Mystery River (River rapids ride/Dark ride, 2005–2017) (rethemed to Excalibur – Secrets of the Dark Forest)
- NICK Speed Racers (Kart racing, 2007–2007)
- Riddlers Revenge (Top Spin, 1999–2004) (rethemed to N.Y.C. Transformer)
- Robert's Rat Race (Tractor ride, 2005–2007)
- Speedy Gonzalez Taxi (Kart Racing, 2003–2004) (rethemed to Mister Valentinos Go Kart Race)
- Swiper's Sweeper (The Whip, 2007–2018) (rethemed to Zooma's Zoomers)
- Team Umizoomi Number Tumbler (Crazy Bus, 2013–2019) (rethemed to Skyes High Flyer)
- Teenage Robot Roundabout (Crazy Bus, 2007–2012) (rethemed to Team Umizoomi Number Tumbler)
- The Daffy Duck Thundercloud (Crazy Bus, 1996–2004) (rethemed to Flying Cloud)
- The Walking Dead: Breakout (Horror maze, 2016–2020)
- Tweety und Sylvester jr. Chase (Carousel, 1996–2004) (rethemed to Brandy Bird's Hat Dance)
- Unendliche Geschichte (River rapids ride/Dark ride, 1996–2004) (rethemed to Mystery River)
- Wonder Pets Flyboat (mini drop tower, 2008–2018)
- Wonderland Studio Tour (train ride, 2005–2006) (rethemed to Dora's Adventure Express)
- Yosemite Sam Railroad (train ride, 1996–2004) (rethemed to Wonderland Studio Tour)

=== Parque de Atracciones de Madrid ===
- 7 Picos (Wildcat from Schwarzkopf, 1969–2005)
- Cumbres (roller coaster for children, 1976–2007)
- Jet Star (Jet Star from Schwarzkopf, 1970–1996)
- Katapult (Katapult from Schwarzkopf, 1990–1993)
- Looping Star (Looping Star from Schwarzkopf, 1992–1998)

== Plopsa ==
=== Plopsa Indoor Hasselt ===
- De Piratenbaan (Force from Zierer, 2005–2012) (rethemed to Wickie Coaster)

== Seattle Center ==
=== Fun Forest ===
- Practically all installed rides have been removed. Special events may include temporary rides.

== United Parks & Resorts ==
=== Adventure Island ===
- Barratuba
- Tampa Typhoon: a water slide that closed after the 2005 season. The slide opened in the late 1980s and shared a tower with Gulf Scream, a current water slide attraction. Standing nearly 70 feet (21 m), or seven stories tall, the ride allowed patrons to see for miles around, including a view of the nearby MOSI museum.
- Gulf Scream

=== Busch Gardens Tampa Bay ===
- The Monorail – closed and removed in 1999
- The original brewery – demolished and Gwazi was built in its place
- The Python – closed October 31, 2006, and demolished as part of a renovation of the Congo area of the park; Jungala took its place
- Rhino Rally – closed in 2014 due to low ridership
- Gwazi – closed in 2015 due to cost and low ridership
- Tanganyika Tidal Wave – closed in 2017 due to cost

=== Busch Gardens Williamsburg ===
- Big Bad Wolf (1984–2009)
- Corkscrew Hill (2001–2009)
- Curse of DarKastle (2005–2017)
- Das Kätzchen (1976–1984)
- Die Wildkatze (1976–1983)
- Drachen Fire (1992–1998; demolished in 2002)
- Europe in the Air (2010–2016)
- Gladiator's Gauntlet (1988–1993)
- Glissade (1975–1985)
- Le Mans Raceway (1975–2006)
- Wild Maus (formerly Izzy) (1996–2003)

=== SeaWorld Ohio ===
- The park was sold to Six Flags in 2001, who then merged the park with Six Flags Ohio to create Six Flags Worlds of Adventure. The park was later sold to Cedar Fair and reverted the park to its original name, Geauga Lake, which permanently closed in 2007.

=== SeaWorld San Antonio ===
- Texas Splashdown was a log flume ride that was added to SeaWorld San Antonio in 1991 and closed on May 13, 2011. Most of the ride has been removed; however, the boat flumes at ground level and the small pavilions used as the queue are now used as a haunted house for Howl-O-Scream.
- Dolphin Cove was an outdoor dolphin exhibit. The attraction was demolished in 2015. The area around the attraction was renovated and opened as Discovery Point in 2016. The spot where Dolphin Cove once stood is now home to the larger Dolphin Lagoon which now gives guests the option to swim with dolphins.
- Rocky Point Preserve was an outdoor exhibit that features sea lions, seals, and otters that closed on September 1, 2014 and reopened as Pacific Point Preserve on May 22, 2015.
- Captain Kids World – original part of the park, as a children's play area, it was closed down due downsize park acreage. Sesame Street Bay of Play is the new play area for kids.
- Places of Learning was a 1 acre map of the united states. The concrete is still there, but it's been painted over and closed for years.
- Pirates 4-D was a 3-D film attraction; replaced by R.L. Stine's Haunted Lighthouse 4-D, then by Pets Ahoy.
- R.L. Stine's Haunted Lighthouse 4-D - a 3-D film attraction based on the book from the Goosebumps series.
- Texas Walk was an outdoor plaza featuring life-sized bronze statues of notable people of Texas. It was standing since the park opened and was removed in 2000. The bronze statues that once stood there were donated to the City of San Antonio.
- Lost Lagoon was a small water park located near Sea Lion Stadium. It opened 1993 and closed in 2011. The area where Lost Lagoon once stood is no longer a part of SeaWorld San Antonio, rather it is part of a separate, gated water park called Aquatica San Antonio. Aquatica may not be a part of the SeaWorld chain, but it is still owned and operated by SeaWorld Parks & Entertainment.

=== SeaWorld San Diego ===
- Submarine Quest – opened in June 2017 as part of the new Ocean Explorer section of the park. It began to operate only intermittently after the summer season, and later closed indefinitely in January 2018 amid negative reviews. While SeaWorld claimed that the ride was undergoing maintenance, it was reported that no such work had actually been occurring.
- Mission: Bermuda Triangle – an "underwater" motion simulator attraction, which opened in 1994; later replaced by Wild Arctic
- Pirates 4-D – a 3-D film attraction; replaced by R.L. Stine's Haunted Lighthouse 4-D
- R.L. Stine's Haunted Lighthouse 4-D – a 3-D film attraction based on the book from the Goosebumps series; replaced by Lights, Camera, Imagination 4-D!
- Madagascar LIVE – This live Character show, in the Mission Bay Theater is now the home of a variety of shows, including Sea Rescue.
- Shamu's Happy Harbor – an interactive children's play area which opened in 1995; in 2007 it was renovated and became Sesame Street Bay of Play
- Window to the Sea – a live education presentation about SeaWorld's environmental and research activities; replaced by Pirates 4-D
- Manatee Rescue – The State of Florida loaned SeaWorld Manatees for display. When the loan ended, Manatee rescued closed and was replaced by Turtle Reef.
- World of the Sea Aquarium – after 50 years at the park, World of the Sea was refurbished and reopened as Aquaria which featured both saltwater and freshwater fishes.
- Places of learning was a 1 acre map of the United States. There was also a book store, called "The Parent's Store." When Anheauser-Busch purchased the parks from HBJ, this was closed for the Clydesdale Hamlet area.
- Animal Connections – Once the home of the Budweiser Clydesdales, Animal Connections included a variety of land animals such as beavers, birds, and sloths. Closed for the construction of Submarine Quest.
- Freshwater Aquarium – closed due to high maintenance costs and slated to be a new beer garden looking over the bay.
- Pet's Rule Show – 16 years in the Nautilus Amphitheater closed in 2019 to make way for a concert venue.

=== Sesame Place Philadelphia ===
- The Amazing Mumford's Water Maze - Closed after the 2005 season to make room for Elmo's World; The spot it once stood in is now an empty pathway.
- Bert's Balance Beams - Closed in 2005.
- Big Bird's Balloon Race - A 40 ft (12 m) high tower ride that affords a view of the park; Closed in 2013 and rethemed to Flying Cookie Jars for Cookie's Monster Land.
- Big Bird Bridge/Steps - The original park icon, consisting of a large Big Bird head and a long bridge, which led to various slides, although near the end of its life it only led to the tube slides. The bridge was removed in the Late-90's and Big Bird's mouth was closed up, which left the steps for photo ops. The steps and head were fully removed in 2007 to make way for the Sunny Day Carousel.
- Big Bird's Court - A large play structure supporting many interactive attractions that opened with the park in 1980; closed following the 2013 season to make room for Cookie's Monster Land.
- Computer Gallery/Games Gallery - An exhibit of computers with educational gaming software installed; replaced in 2001 with the Sesame Cafe.
- The Count's Ball Room - A ball pit with roughly 80,000 plastic balls; closed in 2005 and replaced with Blast Off.
- The Count's Fount - Water play area; Closed in 2008 and replaced by The Count's Splash Castle.
- Elmo: The Musical - LIVE Live show based on the popular Sesame Street segment of the same name; Closed in 2020 and has yet to be replaced.
- Elmo's World Live! - Live show based on the popular Sesame Street segment of the same name; Closed in 2013 and replaced by Elmo The Musical - LIVE.
- Grover's World Twirl - A spinning teacup ride based on the Global Grover segments of Sesame Street; Closed in 2013 and rethemed to Monster Mix Up for Cookie's Monster Land.
- Herry's Hand Over Water - Closed in 1984; replaced by Sesame Construction Company
- Little Bird's Birdbath - Closed in 2009; Replaced by The Count's Splash Castle.
- Little Bird Rapids - Closed in 2009.
- Oscar's Obstacle Course - Closed in 2006
- Rainbow Pyramid - Closed in 2001.
- Rock Around the Block Parade - Opened in 1997; The parade featured the Sesame Street characters in colorful 1950s inspired getup; Replaced in the 2011 season with the Sesame Street Party Parade
- Rubber Duckie Pond - A giant water bed that kids could jump on. It was later redeveloped into a water play area under the same name, before closing in 2010; Replaced by Elmo's Cloud Chaser.
- Sesame Studio - Initially housed a replica of the Sesame Street set for photo ops and several activities; The photo ops were removed in 1988, following the opening of Sesame Neighborhood; Would be transformed into a larger theater that sits vacant as of 2023.
- The Twiddlebug Hop - Closed in 1986.
- Twiddlebug Land - Opened as a park expansion in 1993; Would be rethemed to Big Bird's Beach for the 2023 season; The giant Rubber Duckie statue perched onto one of the slide towers would be relocated to Sesame Neighborhood following the maintenance period.
- Zoom Flume - Closed in 1986.

=== Water Country USA ===
- Atomic Breakers – series of slides and splash pools; closed and removed 2007
- Lemon Drop – two short yellow body flumes which dropped into a deep (10 ft) section of the Adventure Isle pool; closed and removed in 2008
- Little Twister – a small pink children's water slide in the Adventure Isle area; moved adjacent to the Jammin' Juke Box slide tower in the 2008 season with the change to Rock 'n' Roll Island; renamed Little Bopper
- Peppermint Twist – two steep purple-colored body slides took riders through a 180-degree curve; closed following the 2007 season; the tower remains intact and is used as the tower for the new Jammin' Jukebox body slides
- Volleyball Courts – several beach volleyball courts that took up the space where Hubba Hubba Highway is now, and before that were located across from Jet Scream where the lockers are (catering was where the restrooms are)

== Star Trek: The Experience ==
- Star Trek: The Experience – open from 1998 to 2008 at the Las Vegas Hilton; relocated to Neonopolis for the 2010 season.

== Six Flags ==
=== California's Great America ===
- Greased Lightnin' – closed after the 2002 season
- Gulf Coaster – closed in 1980
- Invertigo – closed on October 31, 2010, and opened up at Dorney Park and Wildwater Kingdom as Stinger
- Stealth – closed in 2003 and was relocated to Carowinds in 2004 as the Borg: Assimilator, now known as Nighthawk
- Sky Whirl – a triple Ferris wheel; closed after the 1997 season to make room for Invertigo
- Triple Play – closed in 2004
- Whizzer – closed after the 1988 season

=== Carowinds ===
- Black Widow (formerly Witchdoctor) – removed in 1989
- Carolina Speedway – removed in 1991 to make room for the Vortex stand-up coaster
- Carolina Sternwheeler – removed in 2003; BORG: Assimilator (now Nighthawk) currently operates on this spot
- Carowinds Monorail – removed in 1994
- Flying Super Saturator – removed in 2008 due to low capacity and high maintenance costs; replaced by Carolina Cobra in 2009
- Frenzoid – removed in 2005 but put beside the Afterburn coaster in 2007 then removed in 2022
- Joe Cool's Driving School – removed in the 2012–2013 off season
- Oaken Bucket – removed after the 1987 season; the ride was located across from the Log Flume
- Old Jalopies – removed in 1987
- Plants vs. Zombies 3Z Arena – removed in 2022 to make Room for Aeronautical Landing
- Rip Roarin' Rapids – closed before the 2019 season
- Scooby-Doo's Haunted Mansion – removed in 2009
- Smurf Island – its elements were removed with Carolina Sternwheeler (see above)
- Surfer – removed in 1976
- Southern Star – Removed in 2022 to make way for Aeronautical Landing
- Thunder Road – Demolished in 2015 to make room for Carolina Harbor.
- Woodstock whirly birds (formerly chopper chase) – closed in 2017
- White water falls – removed in 2017
- Waltzer – removed in 1976
- Whirling Dervish – removed in 2001
- White Lightnin' – removed in 1988 and sold to Gold Reef City in Johannesburg, South Africa
- Wild Bull – removed in 1998 and replaced by Top Gun: The Jet Coaster (now Afterburn)
- The Wild Thornberry's River Adventure – removed during the 2009 season
- Yo-Yo – removed in 2022 to make way for Aeronautical Landing

=== Kings Dominion ===
- Apple Turnover was an Enterprise that was manufactured by Anton Schwarzkopf. It operated from 1976–1993.
- The Crypt was a Top Spin that was manufactured by HUSS. It operated from 2005–2019.
- Diamond Falls manufactured by Intamin, opened in 1985 and closed due to maintenance issues in 2002. It was demolished in 2005, and the Italian Job Stunt Coaster (later renamed to the Back Lot Stunt Coaster in 2006) opened in an adjacent area where Diamond Falls once stood.
- El Dorado opened in 2008 and was removed in 2010 to make way for the Windseeker.
- Galaxie opened in 1975 and was closed after the 1983 season; in 1983 a rider fatally struck his head on metal supports when he leaned out to one side of the coaster train. Galaxie was manufactured by SDC.
- Hurler was a wooden roller coaster that was manufactured by International Coasters; it operated from 1994–2015.
- Hypersonic XLC (known for an 80+ MPH high speed launch followed by a 90-degree true vertical ascent and drop; 2001–2007) was closed due to high maintenance and low hourly capacity at the end of the 2007 season. The ride was later scrapped.
- King Kobra opened in 1977 and was removed after the 1986 season and relocated to Jolly Roger Amusement Park in Ocean City, Maryland, then to Alton Towers as Thunderlooper. As of 1999, it has been operating at Hopi Hari Brazil as Katapul - Superman em Defesa da Central de Energia.
- Lake Charles, which hosted shows in the early days of Kings Dominion, was mostly filled in during the early 1990s to make room for a portion of Kings Dominion's new water park. As of the 2005 season, part of the lake still remained.
- Lion Country Safari was closed after the 1992 season; the area the monorail station was located in was rethemed to Congo.
- Monster was an Eyerly Monster ride that operated from 1975–1988. It was located within Candy Apple Grove.
- Mt. Kilimanjaro was a Bayern Kurve which opened in 1976 and was removed in 1989.
- Old Dominion Line was a classic steam powered train that went through the forests of Old Virginia. It opened with the park in 1975 but closed in 1995.
- Racing Rivers operated from 1987–1996. It was a complex of three different water slides which consisted of Torpedo, Riptide, and Splashdown. Depending on the slide, riders rode on sleds or dinghies. Riders rode Racing Rivers in their street clothes.
- Sky Pilot opened in 1989 and was removed in the 1998 season due to maintenance issues. A fatality took place on an identical ride at sister park Kings Island in Ohio. Sky Pilot was manufactured by Intamin.
- Sky Ride opened in 1975 and closed in 1995. Sky Ride was a cable car ride which had stations located in Hanna Barbera Land and Candy Apple Grove.
- Time Shaft (Rotor Ride), Haunted River (formerly Journey to Atlantis), Smurf Mountain (formerly The Land of Dooz) were closed and removed in 1995 to make room for Volcano: The Blast Coaster.
- Vertigo was a caterpillar type ride manufactured by Mack Rides that opened in 1975 and closed in 1983.
- Shockwave was the last Togo stand-up roller coaster in North America. It was located in Candy Apple Grove. Shockwave stayed from 1986–2015. It gave 22 million rides in its lifetime.

=== Six Flags AstroWorld ===
- Six Flags AstroWorld – a 90-acre (360,000 m^{2}) theme park in Houston, Texas, United States. Originally opened as just "AstroWorld" in 1968, the park was a sister attraction to the AstroDome, home of the namesake Houston Astros. Purchased by Six Flags in the mid 1970s, it operated until 2005 when the park was closed and demolished, citing Six Flags' financial woes.

=== Six Flags Great Adventure ===
==== Rides and attractions ====
- African Rivers
- Antique Cars
- Asian Rivers
- Bugs Bunny Barnstormers – formerly Foghorn Leghorn Flyers and Red Baron
- Calypso
- Chaos
- Condor
- Enterprise – renamed Spin Meister in 1993
- Evolution
- Fender Bender
- Flying Wave
- Glow in the Park Parade
- Gondola
- Grand Prix
- Great Train Ride
- Hand Cars
- Haunted Castle – burned in 1984
- Hydro Flume
- Joust-A-Bout – renamed Sky Pilot in 1997
- Jumpin' Jack Flash
- Looney Tunes Log Jam – formerly Elmer Fudd Traffic Jam
- Looping Starship – renamed Space Shuttle in 1993
- Magic Hands
- Matterhorn
- Monster Spin
- Moon Bounce
- Movietown Water Effect
- Musik Express
- North American Rivers
- Panorama Wheel – renamed Phileas Fogg's Balloon Ride in 1993
- Pendulum
- Pirate's Flight
- Porky Pig Pipeline
- Pretty Monster – renamed Dream Street Dazzler in 1976
- Rodeo Stampede
- Rotor – renamed in 1991 as Typhoon and again in 1996 as Taz Tornado
- S.S. Feather-sword
- Schwabinchen – dismantled in 1986 and renamed and rethemed as El Sombrero in 1993
- Scrambler
- Spinnaker
- Stuntman's Freefall
- Super Cat
- Super Sidewinder
- Swiss Bob
- Sylvester Scooters
- Tilt-A-Whirl
- Time Warp – the world's first double inverter
- Traffic Jam
- Troika
- Wild E. Coyote Wild, Wild Web

==== Roller coasters ====
- Alpen Blitz
- Batman & Robin: The Chiller
- Big Fury
- Great American Scream Machine – demolished to make room for Green Lantern
- Jumbo Jet – never opened
- Lightnin' Loops
- Lil' Thunder – originally Screamer
- Rolling Thunder
- Sarajevo Bobsled
- Shockwave
- Ultra Twister
- Viper
- Wild Rider

=== Six Flags Over Georgia ===
- Chevy Show; building was demolished to make room for Shake, Rattle & Roll
- Drunken Barrels; removed to make room for the Wheelie
- Exxon Modern Car Ride; now replaced with Goliath and Dee Jays Diner in the USA section
- Flying Dutchman; located in the Jolly Roger lagoon, removed to make room
- Deja-vu; Giant Inverted Boomerang coaster, moved to Mirabilandia as Sky Mountain
- Thomas Town / Whistlestop Park; replaced Sky Coaster, removed in 2018 to make room for Pandemonium
- Great Gasp; removed after the 2005 season to make room for the Goliath coaster. Its parts were shipped to Six Flags over Texas for use at that park's own Parachute-drop ride of the same name. That ride later closed as well.
- Horror Cave; a haunted house operated inside and underneath the Spanish Fort in the Mexican section of the park (now Bugs Bunny Boomtown)
- Jean Ribault's Adventure - riverboat ride; converted to Thunder River
- Looping Starship; removed to make room for Goliath
- Mini Mine Train; formerly Yahoo Hooler; removed to make room for a convoy ride
- Mo-Mo Monster
- Okefenokee Swamp; replaced with the Monster Plantation, itself later remodeled into the Monster Mansion
- Ragin' Rivers
- Round Up
- Shake, Rattle & Roll; removed at the end of the 2010 season to make room for Dare Devil Dive
- The Six Flags Air Racer; replaced with Acrophobia
- Spindle Top
- Viper; Schwarzkopf shuttle loop coaster; removed to make room for Superman: Ultimate Flight
- Z-Force; an Intamin Space Diver coaster, originally constructed at Six Flags Great America and moved to Six Flags Over Georgia. It was replaced by Ninja (renamed later to Blue Hawk). Z-Force was moved to Six Flags Magic Mountain as "Flashback" and was closed for four years from 2003 to 2007 when it was finally demolished
- Magnetic House (slanted house and tilt house)
- Bullfrog Review
- Phlying Phlyrpus
- People Movers Show
- Buford the Buzzard; a show located in the Modern / USA section.
- Mexican Jumping Beans
- Echo Well; right outside the Magnetic House
- Petsville; a petting zoo located in the USA section. Now hosts shops like Attitudes
- Krofft Puppet Theater; converted into a Drive-in Movie theater, which was itself converted into the Shake, Rattle, & Roll
- Sky Hook; located in the USA section, removed in 1977
- Free Fall; removed in 2006 to make room for Dare Devil Dive
- Astrolift; a Chairlift ride running from east to west. Criss-crossed with the North-south Sky Buckets.
- Wheelie; a HUSS Enterprise; removed in October 2012 to make room for the SkyScreamer
- Dodge City bumper cars; removed in 2016 to make room for the Justice League: Battle for Metropolis ride
- Splashwater Falls; closed in 2017, standing but not operating
- Virtual / Beta Zone; laser tag and later teen dance theater. Formerly stood where the Crime Wave in Gotham City section stands today

=== Six Flags Over Texas ===
- Astrolift – Von Roll Skyway; closed in 1979
- Big Bend – ran at Six Flags Over Texas from 1971 to 1978, when it was relocated to Six Flags St. Louis; was eventually sold for scrap metal
- Caddo Lake War Canoes
- The Cave
- Chameleon
- Cucaracha
- Daffy Duck Lake
- The Great Six Flags Air Racer
- LaSalle's Riverboat Adventure
- Missile Chaser
- Road Runner Runaround
- Roto-Disco
- Spindletop
- Spinnaker – relocated to Six Flags Fiesta Texas as Wagon Wheel
- Texas Cliffhanger – also known as G-Force and Wildcatter

== Other ==
=== Worlds of Fun ===
- Aerodrome (1978–1986)
- Alpine Petting Zoo (1973–1986)
- Barnstormer (1978–1983)
- Berenstain Bear Country (1997–2000)
- Cotton Blossom (1973–1995) – the riverboat built for MGM's 1951 film production of Show Boat
- Either Oar (1987–2000)
- Extremeroller (EXT) (1976–1988; formerly Screamroller until 1983)
- Finnish Fling (1973–2017)
- Half Pint's Peak (1977–1986)
- Humpty's Haven (1978–1987)
- Incred-O-Dome (1981–1997)
- Krazy Kars (1973–2015)
- Omegatron (1986–2001)
- Orient Express (1980–2003)
- Pandamonium! (1987–1996)
- The Python Plunge (1988–1999)
- Rockin' Reeler (1991–2005)
- The Safari (1973–1978)
- Thunderhawk (2002–2015)
- Schussboomer (1973–1984)
- Silly Serpent (1973–1987; formerly Funicular until 1979)
- Ski Heis/Sky Hi (1973–1987)
- Snoopy's Moon Bounce (2011–2015)
- U.S.S. Henrietta (1973–1998)
- Victrix Firing Range (1973–1993)
- Wing Ding (1978–1980)
- Wobble Wheel (1977–1993)
- Zambezi Zinger (1973–1997)

=== Europe ===
==== Djurs Sommerland ====
- Karlo's Taxi (Big Apple from SBF Visa Group, 2000–2014)

==== Dyrehavsbakken ====
- Dillen (Jet-ski ride, c. 2003–2020) (replaced by Tidsmaskinen)
- Racing (roller coaster from Zierer, 1972–2020) (replaced by Græshoppen)

==== Efteling ====
- Bobbaan (Bobsled coaster from Intamin, 1985–2019) (replaced by Max & Moritz)
- Pegasus (junior wooden roller coaster from Dinn Corporation, 1991–2009) (replaced by Joris en de Draak)
- Polka Marina (seastorm ride, 1984–2020) (replaced by playground Nest)
- Roeivijver (Rowing boats, 1954–2011) (replaced by the fountain show Aquanura)
- Spookslot (Haunted attraction, 1978–2022) (replaced by Danse Macabre)
- Waterorgel (Water Organ, 1966–2009) (was used as a TV studio and never opened again)
- Zwembad (Swimming pool, 1953–1989) (replaced by De Vliegende Hollander)

==== Eifelpark ====
- Familien-Achterbahn (Force from Zierer, 1995–2012)

==== Erlebnispark Tripsdrill ====
- Das rollende Weinfass (Haunted swing, unknown–1996) (rethemed to Phantastisches Weinfass)
- Phantastisches Weinfass (Haunted swing, 1996–2011)

Europa-Park

- African Queen (Africa-themed water ride, 1975–2022)
- Baron William`s Mystery Hall (Haunted attraction (simulated), 1991–2007) (replaced by Crazy Taxi and London Bus)
- Ciao Bambini (Cockaigne-themed dark ride, 1982–2011) (rethemed to Piccolo Mondo)
- Europa-Park Historama (Park museum, 1990–2017)
- Eurosat (Indoor roller coaster, 1989–2017) (rethemed to Eurosat - CanCan Coaster)
- Flug des Ikarus (Balloon Race, 1996–2022)
- Dschungel-Floßfahrt (Africa-themed water ride, 1978–2022) (rethemed to Josefinas kaiserliche Zauberreise)
- Interaktive Wasserspiele (Interactive water fountains, 1978–2022)
- Kamtschatka Airline Klub (Simulator ride, 2003–2005)
- Märchengalerie (Fairytale-themed exhibition, 1975–2017) (replaced by Käthe Kruse Puppenausstellung)
- Mercedes-Benz Motorsport Mini Rennbahn (Formula-1-themed playground, 2002–2017) (replaced by the Eurosat Coastiality station)
- Piraten in Batavia (Pirate-themed water dark ride, opened 1987, destroyed by a fire 2018, restored and re-opened in 2020)
- Wikinger-Bootsfahrt (carousel, 1990–2016) (rethemed to Sheep Rock)

==== Freizeit-Land Geiselwind ====
- Abenteuer-Spielplatz (playground, opened 1972, destroyed by a storm 2019)
- Abenteuerturm (Drop tower, ?–2017)
- Autoscooter (Dodgems)
- Black Hole (Enclosed roller coaster from Zierer, 2014–2014) (rethemed to Drachenhöhle)
- Die Wikinger (Pirate ship, 1989–2012)
- Disco Scooter (Dodgems, 1970–2016)
- Drachen-Express (Miniature train, 1970–2016)
- Elektro-Boote (remote-controlled boats, 1981–2019)
- Enterprise (1992–2019) (replaced by Bounty)
- Extrem (Speed, 2017–2017)
- Geisterfahrt (ghost train, 2013–2013)
- Höllenrutsche (slide, 1984–2016)
- Kamel-Reiten (camel ride)
- Kinder-Motorräder (electric scooters, 1983–2017)
- Marienkäferbahn (Tivoli from Zierer, 1989–2008)
- Pony-Reiten (pony ride)
- Power Paddlers (bumper boats, 2007–2017, since 2020 at Panorama-Park Sauerland Wildpark)
- Sesselseilbahnen (Chairlift, 1970–2006)
- Shuttle (Ranger, 1992–2017)
- Space Center (Simulator ride, 1996–2015)
- Street Style (Pendulum ride, 2017–2017)
- Spielplatz (playground, 1980–2016)
- Tukis Kinderkarussell (Merry-go-round, ?–2019)
- UFO Boote (bumper boats, ?–2007)
- Wackel-Fahrräder (1970–2017)
- Wilde Maus (wild mouse from Mack Rides, 2013–2013)
- Wilde Maus (wild mouse from Maurer AG, 2011–2012)
- Zwergerl-Express (train ride, 1970–2016)

==== Freizeitpark Plohn ====
- Drachenlooping (roller coaster, ?–2010)
- Drachenschaukel (crazy bus, ?–2016)
- Silver Mine (roller coaster from Zierer, 2000–2018)
- Sling-Shot Fort Laramie (reverse bungee, 2004–2011)

==== Fraispertuis City ====
- Express (kiddie roller coaster from Soquet, 1987–2004)

==== Hansa-Park ====
- Dampfkarussell (merry-go-round, closed 2004, now at Tolk-Schau Family Park)
- Die Glocke (the bell, 2008–2019) (will be replaced by the area Awildas Welt)
- El Paso Express (powered coaster from Schwarzkopf, 1989–2015)
- Fliegender Hai (Ranger, 1991–2019)
- Flugsimulatoren (simulator rides, closed 2001 & 2006)
- Gondelrad (Ferris wheel)
- La Torre Rapida (mini drop tower, 2001–2009) (rethemed to Odins Luftreise)
- Pony-Reiten (pony ride, ?–2001) (replaced by Pony-Post)
- Power-Tower Monte-Zuma (Power Tower, 2000–2012) (replaced by Der Schwur des Kärnan)
- Russische Schaukel (Ferris wheel, 1990–2014)
- Seeschlange (Tivoli from Zierer, 1977–1992, now at Verden Magic Park)
- Space Scooter (dodgems, 2002–2006)
- Sturmvogel (magic carpet, 1991–2012)
- Torre del Mar (Star Flyer, 2005–2015)

==== Linnanmäki ====
- Apollo (carousel, 1986–1997, from 1998–2011 at Tykkimäki) (replaced by Pallokaruselli)
- Around the World (dark ride, 1997–2004) (replaced by Taikasirkus)
- Autorata (Dodgems, 1950–1963) (replaced by current Autorata)
- Breakdance (1988–2001) (replaced by current Mustekala)
- Calypso (1967–1974, from 1975–1984 at Särkänniemi) (replaced by Enterprise)
- Cortina Jet (Bayern Kurve, 1970–1987) (replaced by Breakdance)
- Enterprise (1975–1998, from 1999–2017 at Tykkimäki) (replaced by Raketti)
- Flying Coaster (Flying Coaster from Eyerly Aircraft Company, later at Gröna Lund) (replaced by Cortina Jet)
- Formularata (kids track ride, 1968–1995) (replaced by the cinema Virtuaaliteatteri)
- Helsinki-pyörä (Ferris wheel, 1964–2005, since 2007 at Tykkimäki) (replaced by Rinkeli)
- Hully Gully (Wipeout, 1972–1972)
- Hully Gully (Wipeout, 1984–1985, from 1986–2008 at Tykkimäki) (replaced by Apollo)
- Hurlumhei (funhouse, 1952–1959) (replaced by Vekkula)
- Ipanarata (kiddie roller coaster, 1971–1989) (replaced by Pikajuna)
- Katapultti (Katapult from Schwarzkopf, 1992–1993) (replaced by Kieputin)
- Kieppi (Booster, 2003–2016) (replaced by Magia)
- Kieputin (Roll-O-Plane, 1951–1977, later at Särkänniemi)
- Kotkot (Track ride, 1993–2017)
- Lasten Maailmanpyörä (Ferris wheel for children, 1979–1995) (replaced by Vankkuripyörä)
- Lasten Mustekala (Carousel, 1990–1996, since 1997 at Tykkimäki)
- Loch Ness (Carousel, 1951–1953)
- Meteoriitti (Carousel, 1990–1999, since 2004 at Tykkimäki) (replaced by HipHop)
- Miniautot (mini dodgems, 1978–2017) (replaced by Pellen Talo)
- Mustekala (Monster, 1979–1984) (replaced by modern Mustekala)
- Naurutalo (house of mirrors, 1967–2002) (replaced by a gift shop)
- Pallokaruselli (Samba Balloon, 1997–2015) (replaced by Propelli)
- Pilvenpyörä (Paratrooper, 1962–1984) (replaced by Sateenkaari)
- Round Up (1961–1975, from 1977–1985 at Särkänniemi)
- Safari (dark ride, 1983–1999) (replaced by Linnunrata)
- Salaisuuksien Talo (funhouse, 1989–1996) (replaced by Nukketalo)
- Sateenkaari (Rainbow, 1984–2009)
- Sokkelo (maze, 2007–2011) (replaced by a gift shop)
- Suihkio (Roto-Jet, 1955–1986, from 1987–2011 at Tykkimäki)
- Troika (1974–1974, since 1975 at Särkänniemi)
- Vauhtihirviö 1 (Tilt-A-Whirl, 1950–1952)
- Vauhtihirviö 2 (Tilt-A-Whirl, 1950–1957)
- Vekkula (funhouse, 1961–2017)
- Vonkaputous (Water Coaster from Premier Rides, 2001–2017)

==== Meli Park (1935–1999) ====
- Calypso (c. 1988–1992)
- Jubilé (Zyklon from Pinfari, 1995–2000)
- Jumbo 5 (steel roller coaster from Schwarzkopf, 1984-late 80s, since 1995 at Pleasurewood Hills)
- Marienkäferbahn (Tivoli from Zierer, 1976–1999, reopened at Plopsaland)
- Piratenboot (Pirate ship, 1978–1999, reopened at Plopsaland)
- Rollerskater (Junior Coaster from Vekoma, 1990–1999, reopened at Plopsaland)
- Racing (steel roller coaster from Zierer, c. 1988-early 90s)
- Splash (Log flume, 1989–1999, reopened at Plopsaland)
- Vliegend Tapijt Djinn (1001 Nacht, 1984–1999)
- Wienerwals (Chair-O-Planes, late 80s–1999, reopened at Plopsaland)

==== Panorama-Park Sauerland Wildpark ====
- Crazy Loop (Loop-O-Plane, 2006–2007)
- Flinker Fridolin (roller coaster, 1993–2007)
- Formel Fun (Kart racing, 1993–2007)
- Oldtimerbahn (vintage car ride, 1987–2007)
- Riesenrad (Ferris wheel, 1992–2007)
- Roter Baron (Red Baron, 1988–2007)
- Rothaarblitz (Powered coaster, 1982–2007)
- Schneckenbahn (Monorail, 1992–2007)
- Steinpilz (Swing ride, 1992–2005)
- Takka-Balla-Swing (Rockin' Tug, 2005–2007)
- Tannenzapfen-Fahrt (Teacups, 1989–2007)
- Wasserbob (Shoot the Chute, 1979–2007)
- Windstärke 14 (waltzer, 1993–2007)

Parc Astérix

- Ronde des Rondins (Family coaster, 1989–2013) (today standing in Fraispertuis City)

==== Phantasialand ====
- Autoscooter (Dodgems, 1968–1986) (replaced by Space Center, the Hollywood Tour and the dinner show Fantissima)
- Ballonfahrt (Samba Balloon, 1993–2009) (replaced by the area Wuze Town)
- Baumberger Irrgarten (Labyrinth, 2010–2021)
- Bienchenflug (carousel, 1979–2009) (replaced by the area Wuze Town)
- Bolles Spieleland (playground, 1970s–2010)
- Bottichfahrt (Water ride, 1971–1993) (replaced by Walzertraum)
- Bullenreiten (Mechanical bull, 2004–2009)
- China-Ausstellung (Exhibition of ancient Chinese artifacts, 1985-?)
- Cine 2000 (180° cinema, 1978–1995) (replaced by Silbermine, Magic World of Siegfried & Roy and Colorado Adventure)
- Condor (1986–2006) (replaced by Talocan)
- Crazy Loop (Crazy Dance, 1995–2004) (replaced by the area Deep in Africa and Black Mamba)
- Galaxis 360 (360° cinema, 1982–1985) (replaced by Cine 2000)
- Gebirgsbahn (Speed Racer from Schwarzkopf, opened 1975, burned down on 1 May 2001) (replaced by River Quest)
- Gondelbahn 1001 Nacht (dark ride themed to the tales of 1001 Nights, 1970–2009) (replaced by the shop Haus der 6 Drachen)
- Grand-Canyon-Bahn (Powered Coaster from Schwarzkopf, opened 1978, burned down on 1 May 2001) (replaced by River Quest)
- Hollywood Tour (Water dark ride, 1990–2020)
- Jumbo (Dumbo, 1979–2000) (replaced by the area Wuze Town)
- Käpt’n Blackbeards Piratenflotte (remote-controlled boats, 2001–2004) (replaced by the area Deep in Africa and Black Mamba)
- Kinder-Riesenrad (Ferris wheel for children, 1993–2009) (replaced by the area Wuze Town)
- Klettergarten (Parkour, 2009–2012)
- Künstlerpavillon (Art exhibition, 1980–1986) (replaced by the Nostalgie-Karussell)
- Märchenwald (Fairytale forest, 1967–2007) (replaced by the area Fantasy)
- Minigolfplatz (miniature golf, 1970s)
- Nostalgie-Karussell (Merry-go-round, 1987–1997) (replaced by a more modern merry-go-round)
- Oldtimerbahn (vintage car ride, 1967–1986) (replaced by Space Center, the Hollywood Tour and the dinner show Fantissima)
- Phantasialand-Jet (Monorail, 1974–2008)
- Polyp (Octopus, 1975–1983) (replaced by Spider)
- Ponyreitbahn (pony ride, 1967–1975) (replaced by Cine 2000)
- Professor Wuzipuhs Clever-Bollen (Edutainment, 2003–2016)
- Race for Atlantis (Simulator ride, 1994–2016) (replaced by F.L.Y.)
- Ruderboote (Rowing boats, 1967–1968) (replaced by Seeräuberfahrt nach Carthagena)
- Santa-Fe-Western-Express (Western-themed train ride, 1967–1986) (replaced by Space Center, the Hollywood Tour and the dinner show Fantissima)
- Schloss Schreckenstein (Haunted attraction, 1972–2008) (replaced by the area Fantasy)
- Seeräuberfahrt nach Carthagena (pirate-themed water dark ride, 1968–1978) (rethemed to Wikingerbootsfahrt)
- Silbermine (dark ride, 1984–2014) (replaced by Taron and Raik)
- Silverado Up 'n' Down (Bungee trampolines, 2004–2015)
- Space Center (Enclosed roller coaster from Vekoma, 1988–2001) (rethemed to Temple of the Night Hawk)
- Spider (Octopus, 1984–1985) (replaced by the Condor)
- Stonewash Creek (Log flume, 1974–2011) (replaced by Chiapas)
- Temple of the Night Hawk (Enclosed roller coaster from Vekoma, 2001–2019) (rethemed to Crazy Bats)
- Tretboote (Pedalos, 1967–1968) (replaced by Seeräuberfahrt nach Carthagena)
- Walzertraum (water ride, 1993–2009)
- Wikingerbootsfahrt (Viking-themed water dark ride, 1979–1999) (replaced by Wakobato and Wözl's Wassertreter)
- Wildwash Creek (log flume, 1974–2011) (replaced by Chiapas)
- Wosi's Abenteuerspielplatz (indoor playground, 2003–2012) (replaced by the show Hack & Buddl)

==== Rasti-Land ====
- Minigolf (1974–2005) (replaced by the area Kids-Dinoworld)
- Oldtimer-Bahn (vintage car ride, 1973–2015) (replaced by Afrika-Fotosafari)
- Polybob (Summer toboggan, ?–2008) (replaced by Reifenrodeln)

==== Särkänniemi ====
- Calypso (1975–1984, now at Tykkimäki)
- Half Pipe (Half Pipe from Intamin, 2003–2019)
- Jet Star (Jet Star from Schwarzkopf, 1980–2012)
- Korkkiruuvi (roller coaster from Vekoma, 1987–2009)
- Pirun Kelkka (Wild mouse, 1973–1974)
- Round Up (1977–1985, from 1986–2002 at Tykkimäki)

==== Serengeti Park ====
- Blitzbahn (Music Express, ?–1996)
- Challenger (carousel)
- Chura Racer (Tivoli from Zierer, 1983–2019)
- Die! Wilde Maus (roller coaster from SDC, 2007–2014)
- Enterprise (1996–2011)
- Graetz' Oldtimer Garage (vintage car ride, 1980–2015)
- Hochseilgarten (Adventure park, 2006–2017)
- Jet Star (Jet Star from Schwarzkopf)
- Kleines Riesenrad (Ferris wheel, 1980–1995)
- Kosmos (1992–1995)
- Leo-Express (Calypso, 1994–2012)
- Rainbow (1996–2011)
- Round Up (1994–2004)
- Ruko Wellenflug (Hang Glider, 1992–2016)

==== Skyline Park ====
- Break Dance (2012–2013)
- Roter Baron (Red Baron, 1999–2016)
- Silberpfeil (Katapult from Schwarzkopf, 1999–2000)
- Sky Jet (Top Scan, 2012–2019, since 2021 at Fantasy Island)
- Skyline Express (Bayern Kurve, 1999–2016)
- Wildwasserbahn (Log flume, 2006–2017, since 2018 at Eifelpark)

==== Spreepark (1969–2001) ====
- Achterbahn (roller coaster from Schwarzkopf)
- Altberliner Oldtimerfahrt (vintage car ride, 1969–2001)
- Autoscooter (Dodgems)
- Baby-Flug (Red Baron, 1996–2001)
- Berliner Ring (kids track ride)
- Bobbahn (Bayern Kurve, closed before 1990)
- Bonanza-Reitbahn (pony ride, 1994–2001)
- Brummel (Merry-go-round, ?–2001)
- Butterfly (Paratrooper, ?–2001)
- Calypso (1977–1990)
- Canale Grande (boat ride, 1994–2001)
- Chapeau Claque (dark ride, 1998–2001)
- Cinema 2000 (360° cinema, 1991–2001)
- Dämonenexpress (ghost train)
- Dinoworld (Models of dinosaurs and a mammoth, 1992–2001)
- Fernlenkboote (remote-controlled boats, ?–2001)
- Flic-Flac (carousel, 2001–2001)
- Fliegender Teppich (Magic carpet, 1992–2001)
- Fun-Express (roller coaster, 1996–2001)
- Ghost House (Haunted house, 1998–2001)
- Grand Canyon (Log flume, 1995–2001)
- Jambalaya (Calypso, 1991–1994, till 2007 in Serengeti Park)
- Jet Star (Jet Star from Schwarzkopf, 1970–2001)
- Karussellriesenrad (Ferris wheel, 1969–2001)
- Kentucky-Ride (1991–2001)
- Kettenflieger (Swing ride, 1991–2001)
- Kinder-Autoscooter (mini dodgems)
- Kinderautos (kids track ride, 1969–1969) (replaced by Altberliner Oldtimerfahrt)
- Kindereisenbahn I (Miniature train) (replaced by Kindereisenbahn II)
- Kindereisenbahn II (Miniature train, ?–1990) (replaced by Kindereisenbahn III)
- Kindereisenbahn III (Miniature train, ?–1994)
- Kosmodrom (Carousel)
- Mega-Loop (roller coaster from Vekoma, 1992–2001)
- Miniscooter (mini dodgems, ?–2001)
- Minitruck-Fahrt (kids track ride, 1996–2001)
- Monte Carlo Drive (kids track ride, 1997–2001)
- Pirat I (Pirate ship, 1991–1992) (replaced by Pirat II)
- Pirat II (Pirate ship, 1992–2001)
- Ramba Zamba (Carousel)
- Raupenbahn (Caterpillar)
- Riesenrad (Ferris wheel, 1989–2001)
- Rollover Jill (Rollover, 1998–2001)
- Rotary Cup (Teacups, 1992–2001)
- Santa Fe-Express (train ride, 1992–2001)
- Schwanen-Fahrt (boat ride, 1994–2001)
- Seesturmbahn (seastorm ride, 1991–2001)
- Spider (Octopus, 1991–2001)
- Spiegellabyrinth (Mirror maze, 1998–2001)
- Spielplatz (playground, ?–2001)
- Spreeblitz (roller coaster, 1992–2001)
- Walzerfahrt (waltzer, ?–2001)
- Wellenreiter (slide, 1976–1980)
- Wellental (Slide, 1991–2001)
- Wild River (log flume) (replaced by Flic-Flac)

==== Tier- und Freizeitpark Thüle ====
- Pendelbahn (Butterfly from Sunkid, 1987–2018)

==== Tivoli (Copenhagen) ====
- Bob-Banen (Wooden bobsled coaster, 1937–1937)
- Karavanen (roller coaster from Zierer, 1999–2018)
- Mariehonen (roller coaster from Zierer, 1974–1990s)
- Odinexpressen (Powered coaster from Mack Rides, 1985–2018)
- Rutschebanen (shuttle coaster, 1843-1887)
- Rutschebanen (wooden roller coaster, 1887–1902)
- Rutschebanen (wooden roller coaster, 1902–1914)
- Skovtrolden (steel roller coaster from Schwarzkopf, 1969–1989)
- Slangen (steel roller coaster from Zierer, 1989–2003)

==== Tivoli Friheden ====
- Orkanens Øje (steel roller coaster from Pinfari, 1986–2018)

==== Toverland ====
- Woudracer (Summer toboggan, 2004–2014) (rethemed to Maximus' Blitz Bahn)

==== Traumlandpark (1977–1991) ====
- Alpenblitz (Powered coaster from Schwarzkopf, 1986–1989)
- Begehbares Herz (Walkthrough, ?–1986)
- Black Hole (Enclosed roller coaster from Zierer, 1989–1989)
- Blauer Enzian (Powered coaster from Mack Rides, 1987–1991)
- Cinema 180 (180° cinema, 1979–1986)
- Marienkäferbahn (Tivoli from Zierer, 1979–1985)
- Super Spirale (Corkscrew with Bayerncurve from Vekoma, 1979–1986)
- Traumlandbahn (roller coaster from Zierer, 1983–1983)
- Vierer-Bob (Four Man Bob from Zierer, 1987–1991, now at Family Park in France)

==== Tykkimäki ====
- Apollo (carousel, 1998–2011, from 2012–2015 at Wasalandia)
- Cortina-Jet (Bayern Kurve, 1988–2006)
- Disco Jet (Music Express, 1995–1998)
- Enterprise (1999–2017)
- Hully Gully (Wipeout, 1986–2008, since 2010 at Nokkakivi)
- Mysteerio (funhouse, 1997–2015)
- Naurutalo (house of mirrors, 1986–2005)
- Round Up (1986–2002, since 2006 at Nokkakivi)
- Sokkelo (maze, 1986–2001)
- Suihkio (Roto-Jet, 1987–2011)

==== Verden Magic Park ====
- Die! Wilde Maus (roller coaster from S&MC, 2002–2006)

==== Wasalandia (1988–2015) ====
- Apollo (carousel, 2012–2015)

==== Wurstelprater ====
- €uro-Coaster (Suspended Coaster from Reverchon, 2020–2020)
- Achterbahn (wooden roller coaster, ?–1927)
- Cortina Bob (Jet Star from Schwarzkopf, 1969–1993)
- Düsenspirale (roller coaster from Schwarzkopf, 1964–1968)
- Einschienenbahn (wooden roller coaster, 1955 – c. 1969)
- Flugbahn (wooden roller coaster, 1935–1945)
- Galaxia (steel roller coaster from Barbisan, 2008–2008)
- Hochbahn (wooden roller coaster, ?–1965)
- Hochbahn (steel roller coaster from Pinfari, 1966–1977)
- Hochbahn (steel roller coaster from Pinfari, 1979–1996)
- Hochschaubahn (wooden roller coaster from LaMarcus Adna Thompson, 1909–1944)
- Höllenblitz (Spinning Coaster from Stein, 2017–2017)
- Jet Star II (Jet Star from Schwarzkopf, c. 1972–1980s)
- Looping Bahn (roller coaster from Pinfari, 1985–1995)
- Loopingbahn (wooden roller coaster, 1948–1950s)
- Luna-Bahn (wooden roller coaster from LaMarcus Adna Thompson, 1910–1911)
- Niagara-Wasserbahn (wooden roller coaster, 1928–1931)
- Olympia Looping (steel roller coaster from BHS, 2016–2016/2018–2018)
- Rodelbahn (wooden roller coaster, 1940–1959)
- Speedy Gonzales (Wild mouse from Vekoma, 1985–1987)
- Teststrecke (steel roller coaster from Schwarzkopf, 2019–2019)
- Vierer-Bob (four-man bob from Zierer, 1978–1978)
- Wasserrutschbahn (wooden roller coaster, 1899–1902)
- Wiener Looping (shuttle coaster from Schwarzkopf, 1982–1982)
- Wilde Maus (wild mouse from Maurer Rides, 1996–1997)

== See also ==
- List of defunct amusement parks
