= Zambezi Zinger =

Zambezi Zinger may refer to:

- Zambezi Zinger (1973), a steel roller coaster built in 1973
- Zambezi Zinger (2023), a hybrid roller coaster scheduled to open in 2023
