= Zambezi Zinger (2023) =

Roller coaster at Worlds of Fun

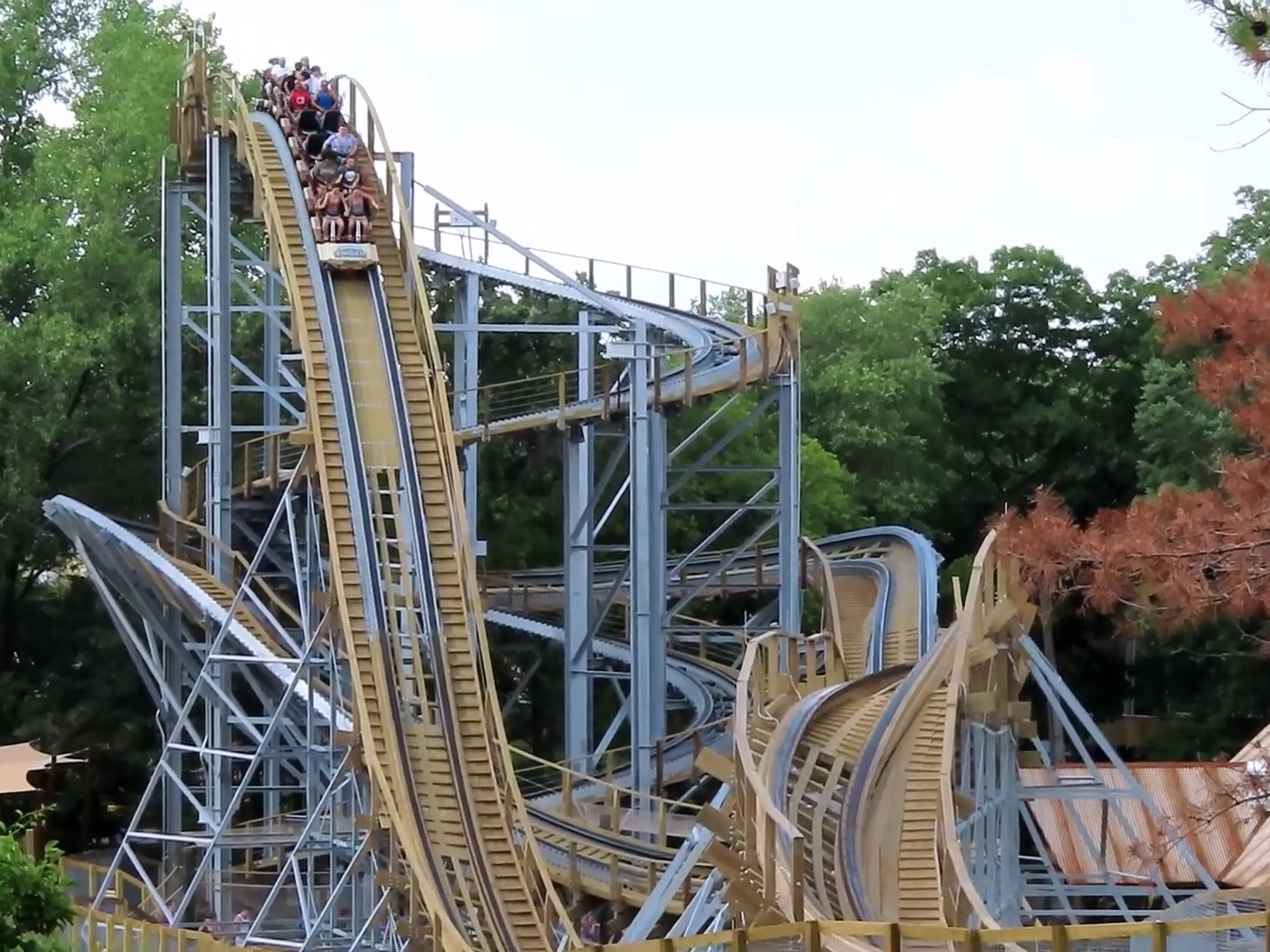

Worlds of Fun
- Location: Worlds of Fun
- Park section: Africa
- Coordinates: 39°10′25″N 94°29′5″W
- Status: Operating
- Soft opening date: June 10, 2023
- Opening date: June 19, 2023
- Replaced: Dinosaurs Alive!

General statistics
- Type: Wood
- Manufacturer: Great Coasters International
- Designer: Skyline Design
- Lift/launch system: Booster Wheel lift hill
- Height: 74 ft (23 m)
- Length: 2,428 ft (740 m)
- Speed: 45 mph (72 km/h)
- Inversions: 0
- Duration: 2:00
- Height restriction: 48 in (122 cm)
- Trains: 2 trains with 8 cars. Riders are arranged 2 across in a single row for a total of 16 riders per train.
- Fast Lane available
- Zambezi Zinger at RCDB

Video

Zambezi Zinger is a wooden roller coaster located at Worlds of Fun in Kansas City, Missouri, United States. Manufactured by Great Coasters International (GCI) and designed by Skyline Design, the hybrid coaster features a wooden track with a steel support structure, and it opened to the public on June 19, 2023. The ride is named after the original Zambezi Zinger (1973–1997), a popular steel coaster that opened with the park in 1973. The updated version shares a few similarities to the original and is the first new coaster at Worlds of Fun in more than a decade since the debut of Prowler in 2009.

== History ==
When Worlds of Fun first opened to the public in 1973, the original Zambezi Zinger was one of three roller coasters featured at the park. It became one of the most popular rides among guests and operated until 1997, when it was removed and relocated to Parque del Café in Colombia, reopening as Montaña Rusa in 1999.

For its 50th anniversary, Worlds of Fun made the decision to add a new roller coaster to its ride lineup that would pay homage to original Zinger as a "nostalgic nod to the past". The reimagined version was designed to feature some similarities to the original, including a spiral lift hill, a mid-course tunnel, and the same line queue building with revamped theming. It was built in the same location as the former Zinger.

The coaster was originally planned to debut on May 26, 2023, but the official opening was delayed due to ongoing testing. The park began offering occasional rides to the public as early as June 10, upsetting raffle winners of the coaster's "First Riders Experience", which was postponed indefinitely. In response to complaints, the park clarified that the coaster was not yet officially open but that rides "may be given from time to time". The grand opening for Zambezi Zinger was finally held on June 19.

In the 2024–2025 off-season, the park added an enclosure around the coaster's spiral lift hill.
