= Donkey rides =

British beach entertainment feature

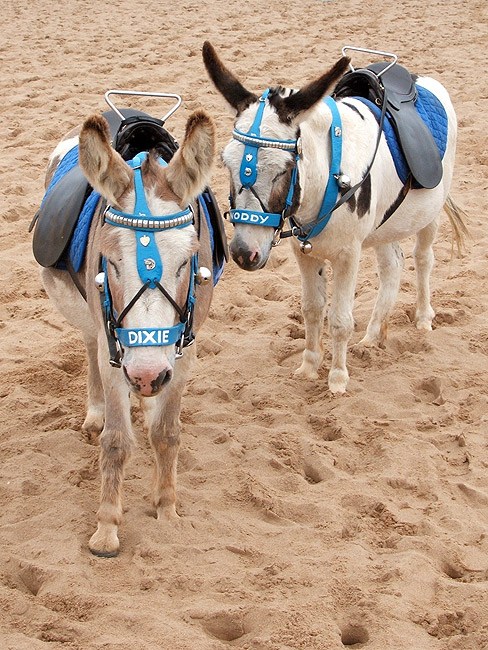
British seaside donkeys in Skegness, Lincolnshire, used for donkey rides on the beach.

Donkey rides are a traditional feature of seaside resorts in the United Kingdom. Children are allowed to ride donkeys on a sandy beach for a fee in summer months while on holiday, normally led in groups at walking pace. Typically, the donkeys used to have their names on their harnesses so they could be identified by children and parents alike.

Donkey rides have been available since 1886 in Weston Super Mare and since 1895 in Bridlington. The tradition started in Victorian times, but is now much less popular. It is probable that the donkeys offered to ride on were originally working draught animals in the cockle industries around the coast.

In 2017, a petition to ban traditional donkey rides gained more than 110,000 signatures, 18,407 from the UK.

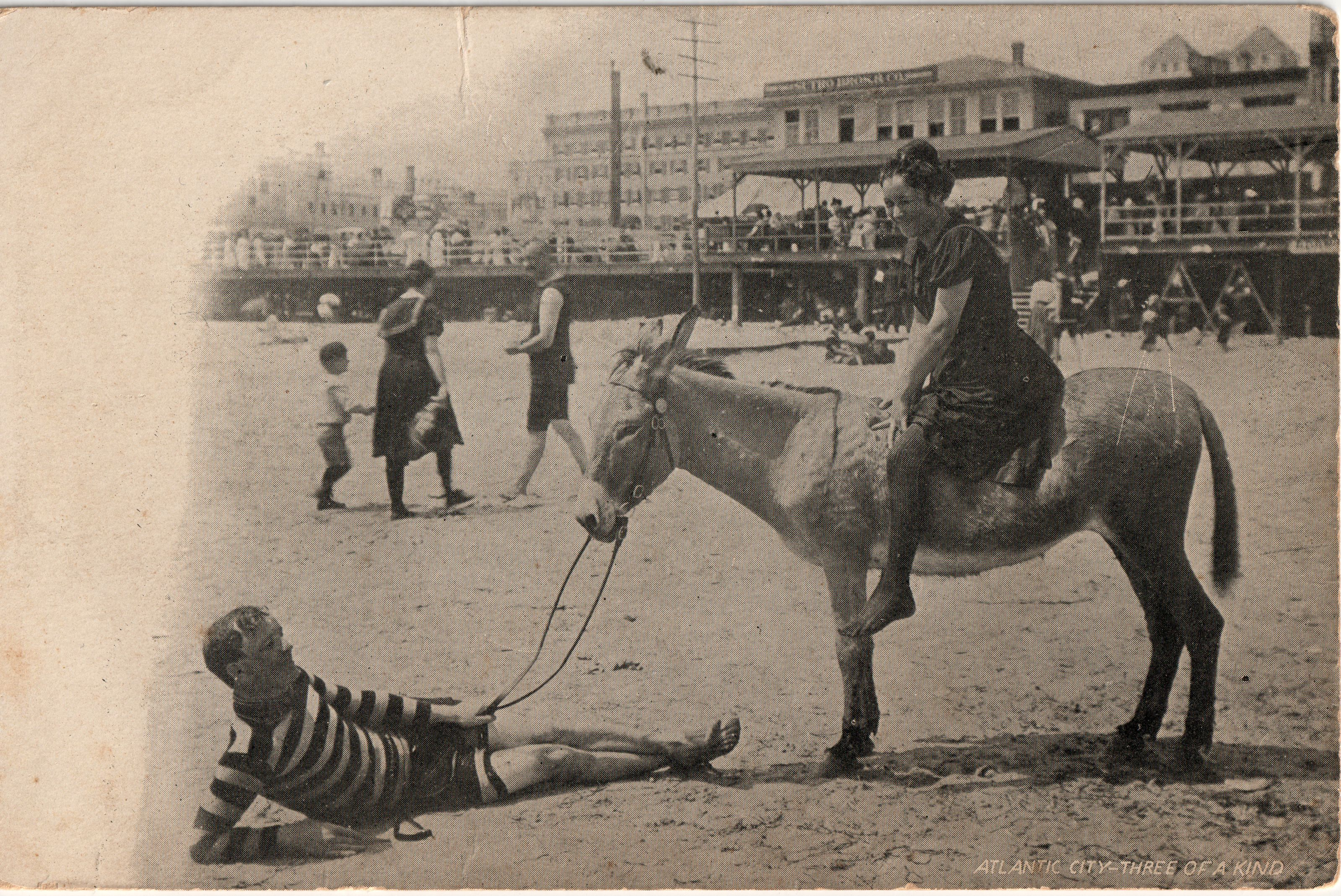
A woman taking a donkey ride at the beach in Atlantic City, New Jersey, early 20th century

== See also ==
- Pony ride
- Punch and Judy, another traditional holiday attraction
