= Pitt Fall =

Defunct drop tower at Kennywood

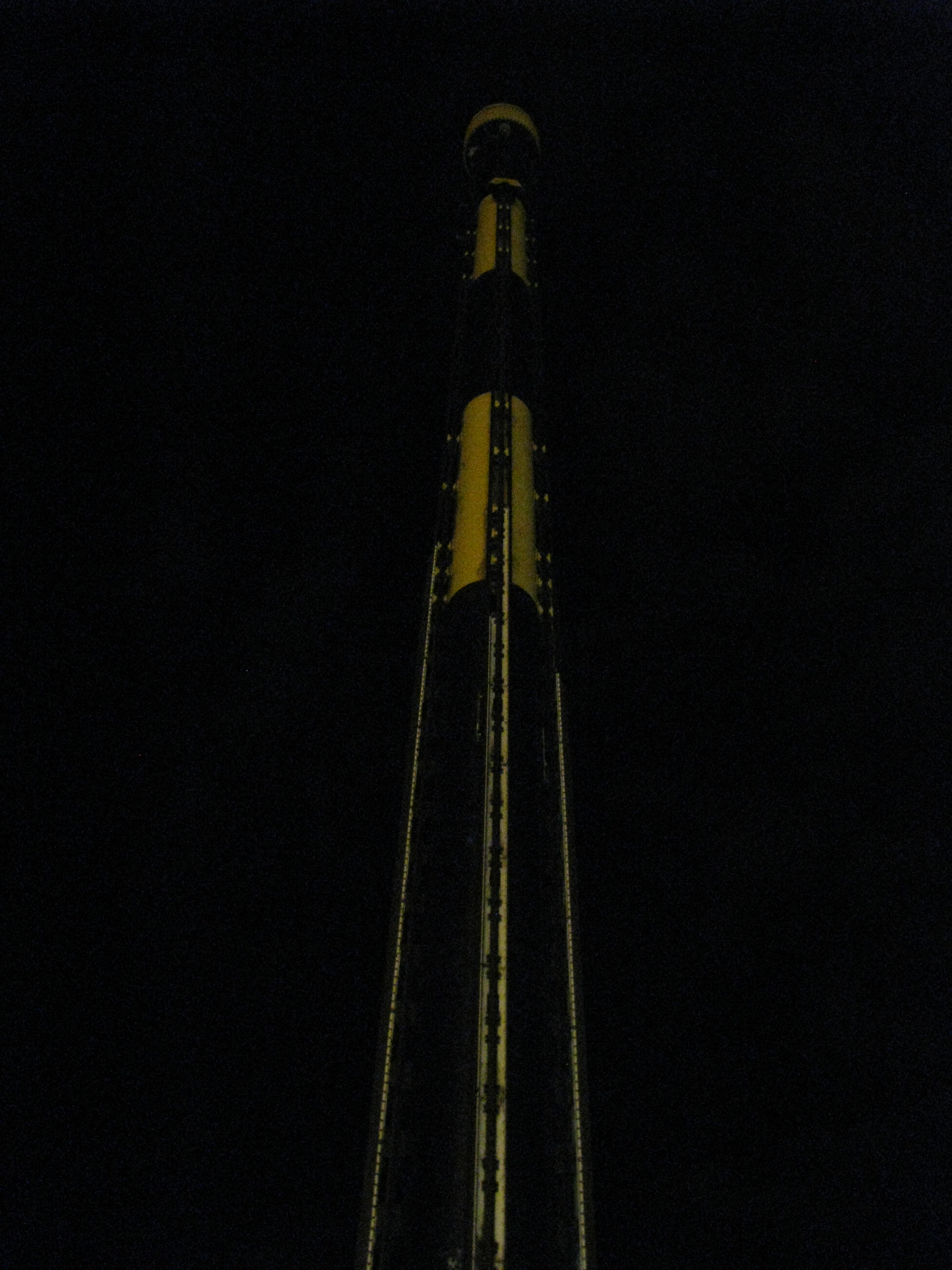
- Pitt Fall's yellow and black structure at night

Kennywood
- Area: Lost Kennywood
- Status: Removed
- Soft opening date: April 17, 1997
- Opening date: April 20, 1997
- Closing date: September 18, 2011
- Replaced by: Black Widow

Ride statistics
- Attraction type: Drop tower
- Manufacturer: Intamin
- Model: Giant Drop
- Height: 251 ft (77 m)
- Drop: 229 ft (70 m)
- Speed: 65 mph (105 km/h)
- Vehicles: 4
- Riders per vehicle: 4
- Height restriction: 48 in (122 cm)

Pitt Fall was a drop tower ride located at Kennywood amusement park in West Mifflin, Pennsylvania. The name of the ride was a pun on the word "pitfall", a type of booby trap, but spelled with two "t"'s in reference to the nearby city of Pittsburgh. When it opened in 1997, it was the tallest drop tower in the world. The ride was manufactured by Intamin and its model is known in the industry as a "Giant Drop".

== History ==
Construction of Pitt Fall began in July 1996 at the former site of Phantom Flyers. Pitt Fall soft opened on April 17, 1997, during a special preview day. The ride opened to the public on April 20, 1997.

In June 2011, Pitt Fall was listed for sale and bought in early September by an undisclosed buyer. After 14 years of operation, Pitt Fall permanently closed on September 18, 2011. It was replaced by Black Widow in 2012.

== Ride experience ==
A group of sixteen or fewer riders would be loaded into a group of four ride cars which seated four riders each. The riders were then secured with an over-the-shoulder harness and an interlocking seat belt. As the riders boarded, four yellow catch cars slowly descended from the top of the tower and coupled onto each ride car. After the all-clear was given, the catch cars pulled on the ride vehicles, lifting them off the ground and ascending to the top of the tower.

After clearing the braking zone, the cars picked up speed, reaching 12 mph. They were held 229 feet in the air for several seconds, after which they were released from the couplings, allowing the cars to free-fall nearly 150 feet at 65 mph.

Upon reaching the braking zone, magnetic brakes slowed the speed of the ride cars. Once the cars came to a stop on the ground, the riders lifted their safety harnesses and exited the ride.

== Records ==
Preceded by Drop Tower: Scream Zone	World's Tallest Vertical Drop Ride; 1997	Succeeded by Power Tower (Cedar Point)
