= Giant Drop =

Giant Drop may refer to:

- The Giant Drop, an Intamin drop tower at Dreamworld in Gold Coast, Australia
- Giant Drop (Six Flags Great America), an Intamin drop tower at Six Flags Great America in Gurnee, Illinois
