= Nickelodeon: Outta Control =

Closed walk-through fun house ride

Alton Towers
- Area: Cred Street
- Status: Closed
- Opening date: 1997; 28 years ago
- Closing date: 1998; 27 years ago

Ride statistics
- Theme: Nickelodeon (UK and Ireland)
- Participants per group: 20
- Must transfer from wheelchair

Nickelodeon: Outta Control was a former attraction in conjunction with Nickelodeon in the Cred Street (now The World of David Walliams) area of Alton Towers theme park in Staffordshire, England. The attraction opened in 1997 consisting of several rooms, each with its own theme. The fun house featured a variety of interactive options, including slides, rope bridges, and a room filled with sound effect buttons. Upon leaving, guests were played back a recording of their journey around the attraction. The attraction closed in 1998 for unknown reasons.

Another ride, Frog Hopper, was placed next to it in 1999. However, in 2017, Froghopper was moved in front of the SBNO 4D Cinema. The Cred Street area was re-themed to Cloud Cuckoo Land in 2009, and re-themed again to The World of David Walliams in 2021. The attraction's building remains unused despite these re-themings.
