= Pony ride =

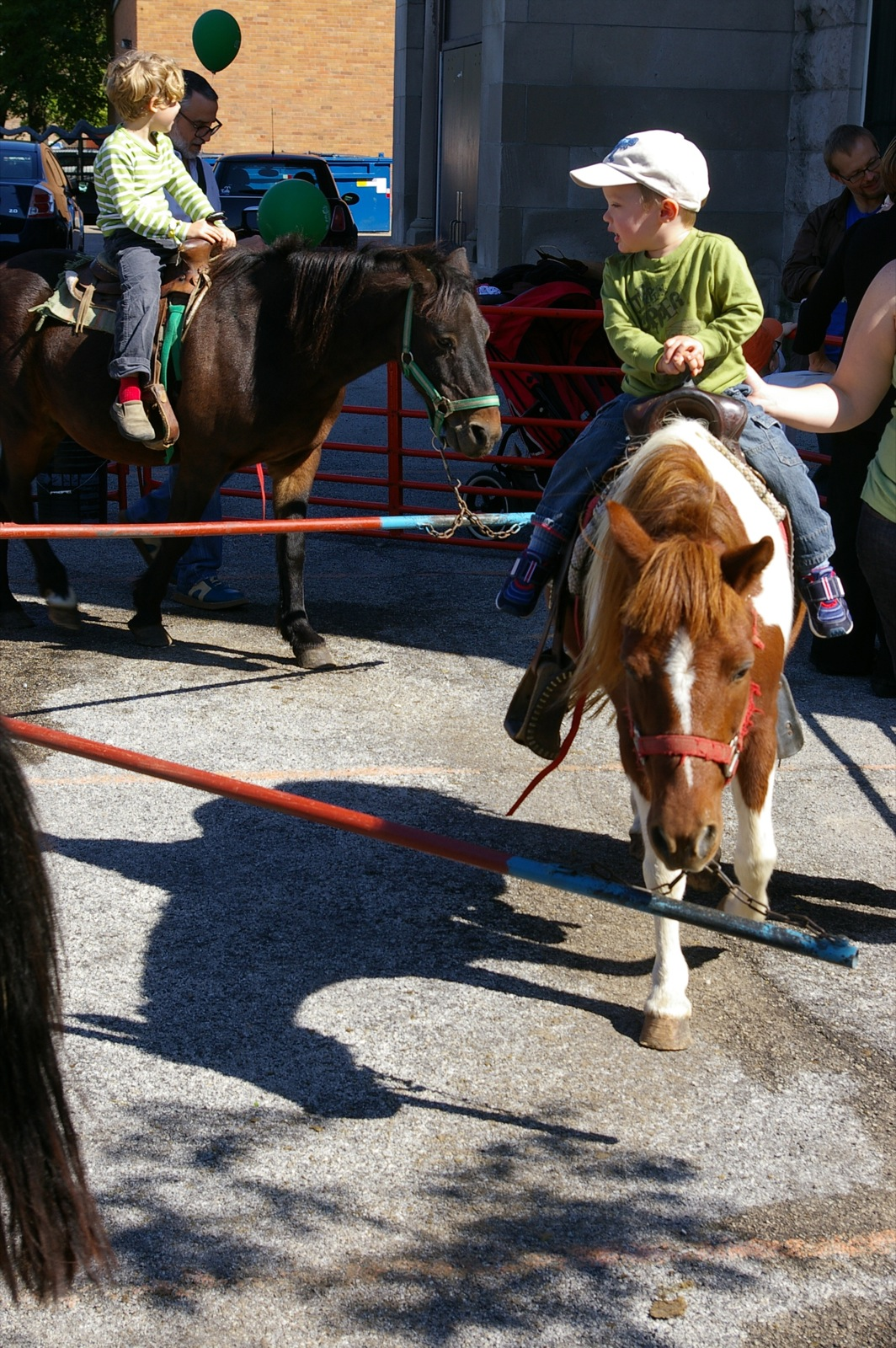
A child on a pony wheel pony ride

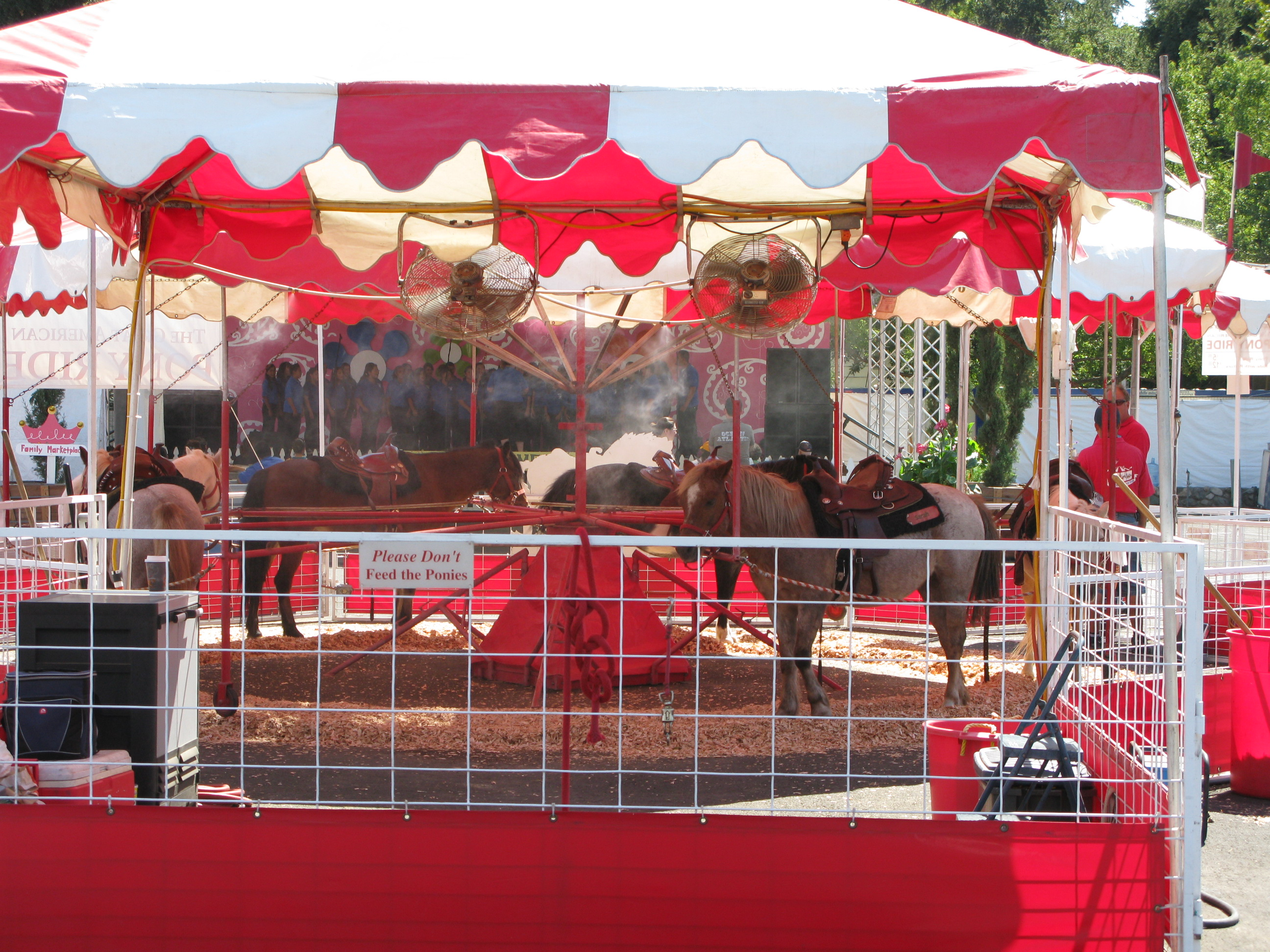
A pony ride at a fair

A pony ride in Japan

A pony ride is an opportunity for children to ride real ponies for a short time, usually seen at fairs, guest ranches, zoos, summer camps, private children's parties and similar places. Children on pony rides do not handle the pony themselves, but they need to be old enough to sit up straight and hold their head up without support. Pony rides may be given on individually hand-led ponies, or in a group of ponies, usually four to six, placed on a "pony wheel," a small type of hot walker that leads all ponies in a walk on a small circle so that fewer handlers are needed. Safety is a paramount concern and insurance companies consider pony rides to be a high-risk activity. There are concerns about the welfare of some ponies used for pony rides.

== Types of ponies ==
Ponies for younger children generally are under 14 hands (56 inches, 142 cm), and often much smaller. A rule of thumb is that the legs of the child should reach at least halfway down the sides of the pony. The Shetland pony is a breed often used for pony rides. Best practices advise that ponies be at least 4 1/2 years old. Stallions are not appropriate for pony rides, and when mares are used, they should not work while they are in heat.

== Children ages and sizes ==
Recommendations vary with the size of the pony, but children who participate in pony rides need to be able to sit up and hold their head up without support, thus children under the age of one are too small to safely ride ponies. Best practices are that children be at least three years old, but some reputable programs accept children age two and up. Maximum size of riders usually correlates to the size of the pony, but standards range from under 80 pounds (36 kg) to about 100 pounds (45 kg). Weight, not age, usually limits the biggest riders, but some programs require participants to be no older than 12.

== Safety ==
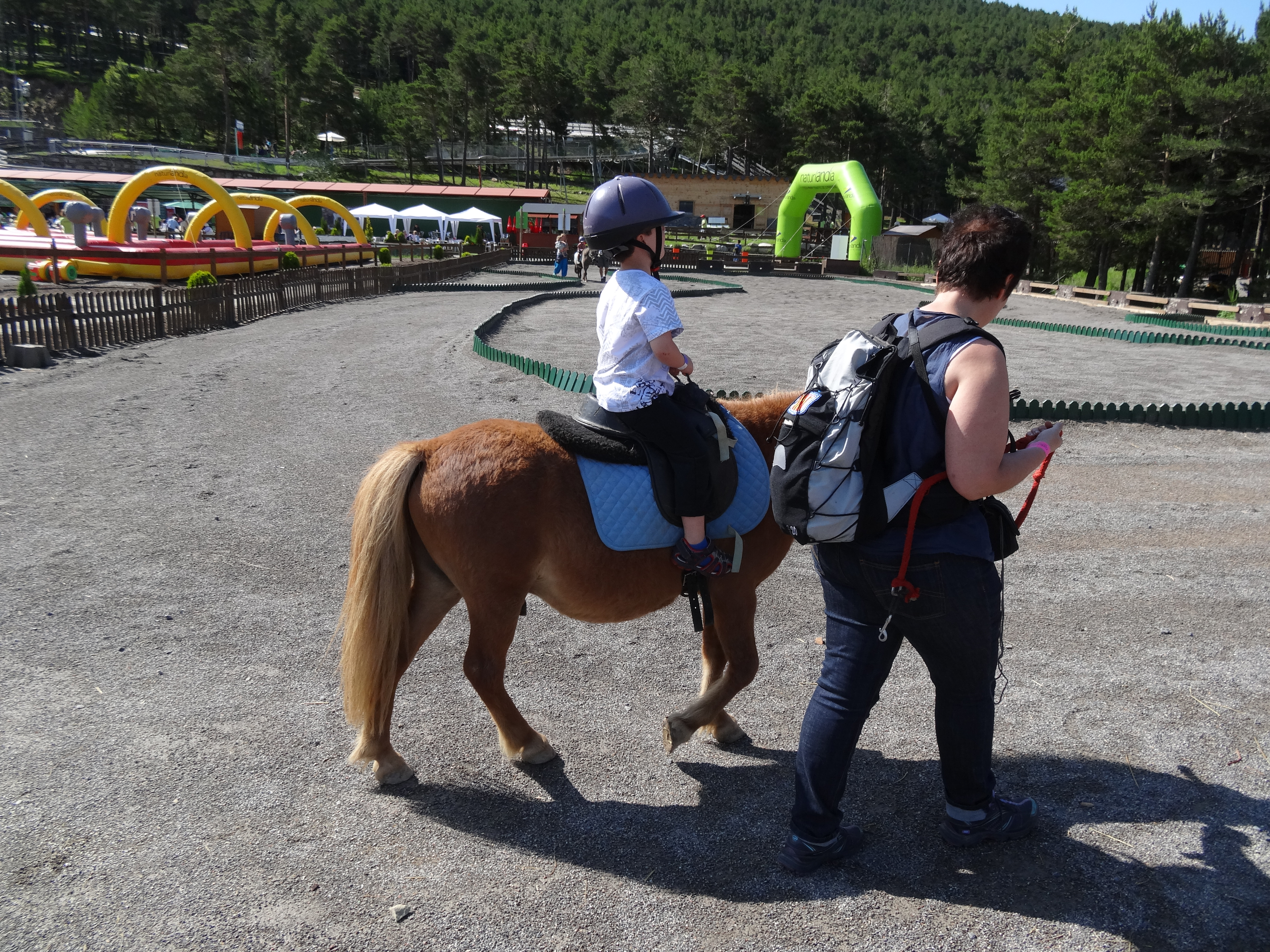
Using equestrian helmets for riders is a best practice, and required by law in some places. They are more often seen on hand-led pony rides.

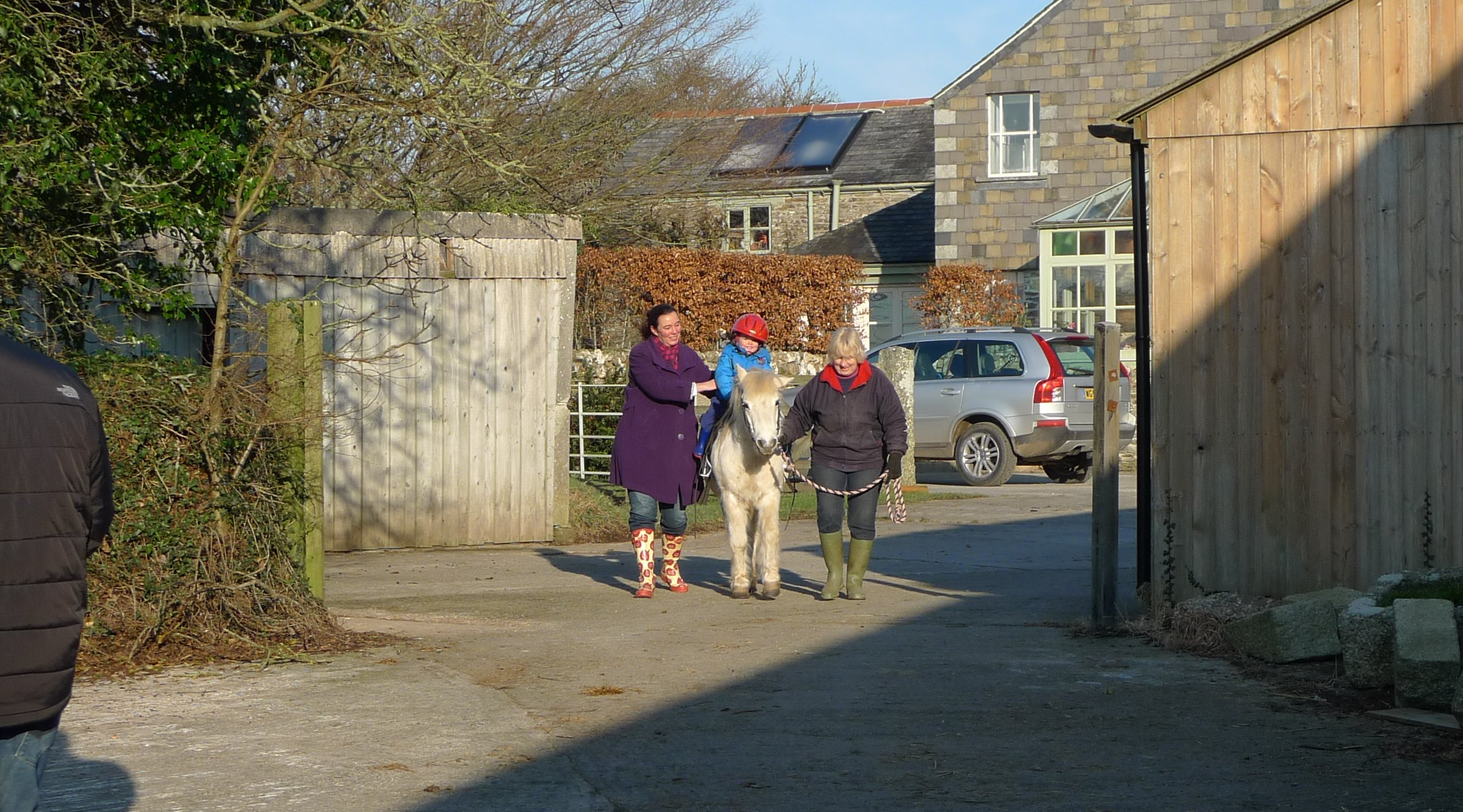
A small child being hand-led on a pony, with two adults, one handling the pony, and the other watching the child

Pony rides are considered a high risk equine activity. Pony ride operators are generally advised to carry liability insurance and to hire staff who are experienced with horses. Equestrian helmets are mandated by law for children in some places, and their use for all children is considered a best practice. Staff should have first aid certification and be covered by workers' compensation insurance.

The safest method for in-hand pony rides is to have two people with each child, one on either side of the pony, similar to the methods used for therapeutic horseback riding. Trained staff should handle the pony, help the child get on and off the pony, and be sure equipment is properly adjusted. Most parents should not be asked to handle the pony, because parents usually lack horse experience and knowledge. That said, where a second person is used as a "spotter" to help balance the child, a parent can fill that role, so long as they are healthy enough to keep up with the pony and able to remain calm around the animal.

A pony wheel eliminates the need for a separate person to lead each pony, but a parent or other spotter can still walk beside the animal to help steady the child. Other methods of controlling the pony with a child on board, such as ponying from another horse or riding double are generally considered unsafe.

Modern standards state that children are never to be belted or strapped onto ponies. It was once common for children to be belted to the saddle by velcro or leather straps on pony wheel rides, though this was never considered a safe practice for in-hand pony rides. Safety studies conducted in 1999 led to recommendations that children not be belted onto ponies in any setting. Stirrups, when used, need to be adjusted to fit each child.

=== Enclosures ===
Pony rides need to be conducted in an enclosed area to help contain a pony that might escape and to give the pony a visual boundary. Low or flimsy fencing is not a best practice. Welded pipe panels are considered safe for portable fencing, such as at fairs. Settings with permanent pony rides that put up wooden fences need rails or planks to be placed on the inside of the fenceposts so that children do not hit their legs and feet on the posts.

== Training and equipment ==
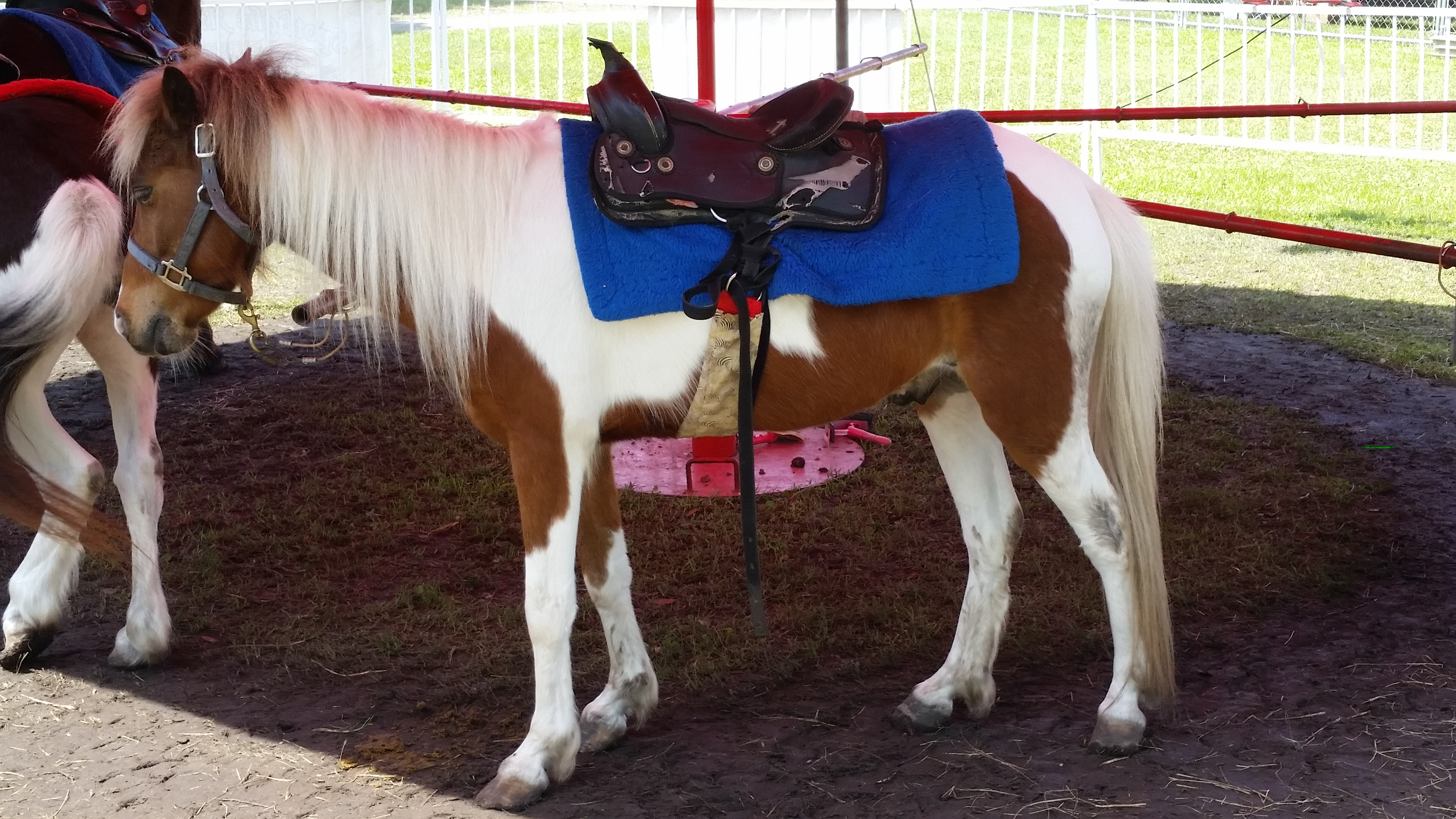
A pony equipped on a pony wheel

Ponies used for pony rides need to be quiet, well-trained, and desensitized to children, noise, and crowds. At fairs in particular, ponies are exposed to loud noises and traffic.

Ponies are usually given western saddles for children's rides because they are less likely to slip and children can hang onto the saddle horn. Straps or loops should not be added to the saddle because children's hands can be caught in them. Saddles need to be properly fitted to the pony for its welfare and comfort. Stirrups, when used, should be wider than for regular riding to help prevent children's feet from getting caught, particularly because many children who take pony rides are wearing sneakers instead of boots. Tapaderos over the stirrups can help prevent a foot from going all the way through the stirrup and getting trapped, but only if properly designed so a child's foot doesn't get wedged between the tapadero and the front of the stirrup.

To protect the pony's mouth, and because ponies are led rather than having the child control the pony directly, a halter or caveson is used, rather than a bit and bridle. Side reins are not advised for pony rides. On hand-led rides, leading with a dog obedience chain added around the nose as a lead shank for safety and extra control is recommended.

Pony wheel rides are also sometimes called "carousel" rides. Pony wheels are often custom-manufactured. The largest pony wheels can accommodate up to 11 or 12 ponies, but most accommodate four to six.

Hand-led rides can be held in an area about 40 by 80 feet (12 m × 24 m), which is large enough to move around, but confines the pony in case of problems. For hand-led rides, a mounting block or ramp can be used to help children get on and off the pony.

== Pony welfare and law ==
The United States Department of Agriculture mandates that carnivals that exhibit animals, roadside zoos and many similar programs be licensed or registered to operate under the Animal Welfare Act of 1966, 7 U.S.C. § 2131 et seq., which protects animals not raised for food or fiber. The Act requires that animals have "adequate housing, sanitation, nutrition, water and veterinary care, and ... [protection] from extreme weather and temperatures." There also has to be an adequate number of handlers. While horse and pony rides can sometimes be exempt, because equines are "farm animals" under 9 CFR §1.1, and exhibitors at fairs and horse shows do not fall within the regulatory definitions, if they are part of a petting zoo or carnival, they fall under the statute.

Care for working ponies includes using fly spray in the summer and providing regular access to water. There should be good footing for the ponies, such as sand or shavings brought in to put on top of pavement, but a clay lot or grassy area can also be used. Children need basic instructions to not scream or poke at the animals. Providing instruction for children to sit up straight and how to hold their legs is a best practice.

Some animal rights advocates oppose pony rides, suggesting that a merry-go-round is an acceptable substitute. The official position of the American Society for the Prevention of Cruelty to Animals is "The ASPCA is opposed to the cruelty that is inherent in ... attractions such as elephant rides, camel rides, and llama and pony rides that either stand alone or are attached to [petting zoos]." Concerns of animal rights and animal welfare advocates generally concern ponies being subjected to harassment from the public, not getting enough water, and lack of rest. Sometimes there is also criticism that ponies are overfed and obese.

== See also ==
Media related to Pony rides at Wikimedia Commons

- Donkey ride
