= Parque del Café =

Ecological and amusement park in Colombia

- Previously known as National Coffee Museum and Parque Nacional del Café
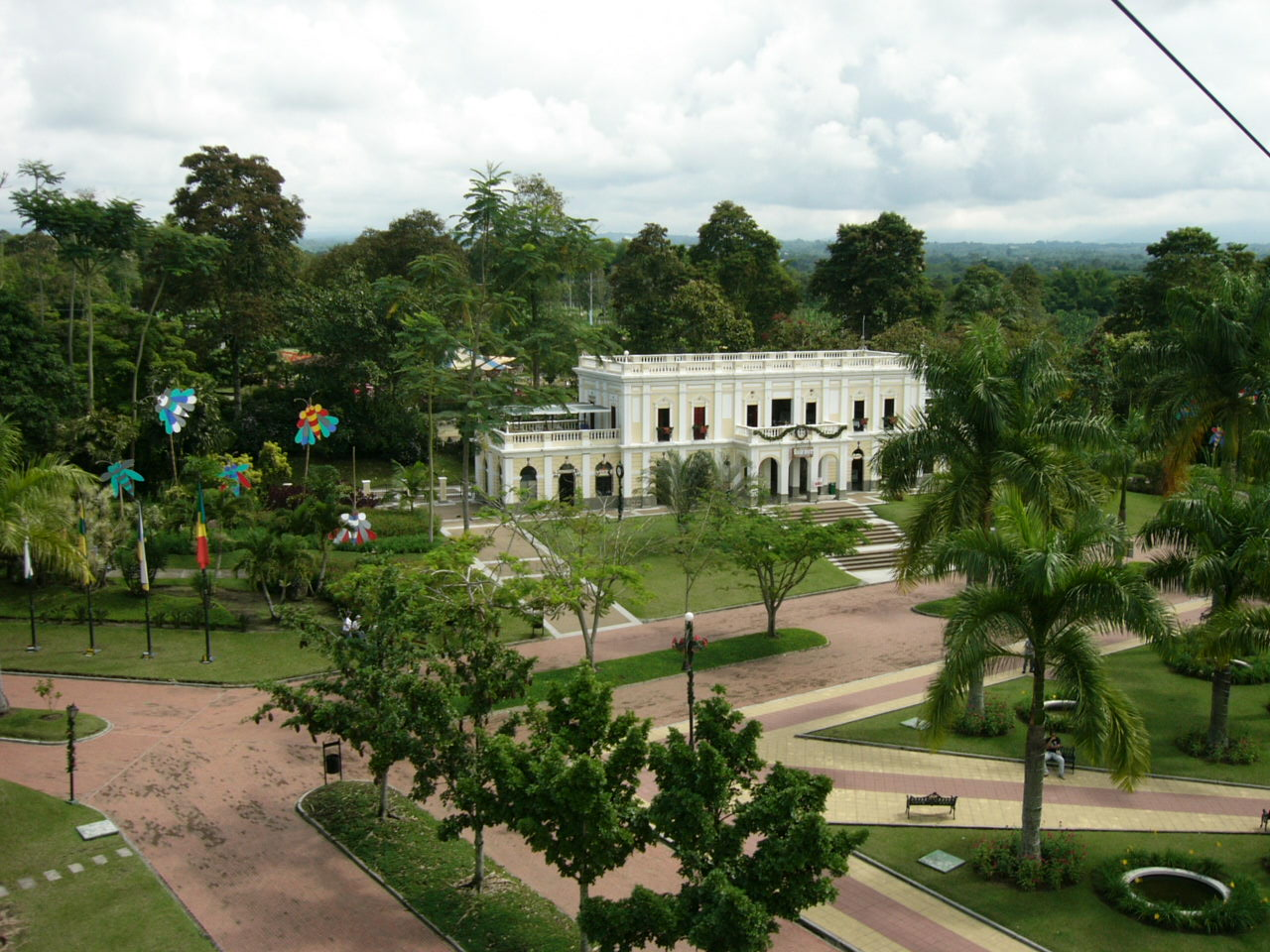
- Plaza of the Coffee Park
- Interactive map of Parque del Café
- Location: Montenegro, Quindío, Colombia
- Coordinates: 4.54°N 75.77°W
- Status: Operating
- Opened: 24 February 1995
- Owner: National Federation of Coffee Growers of Colombia; Departmental Committee of Coffee Growers of Quindío
- General manager: Pedro Nel Salazar Hoyos
- Theme: Coffee; amusement park
- Attendance: 1,050,000 (2017)
- Area: 125 ha (310 acres)

Attractions
- Total: 27 (as of 2018)
- Roller coasters: 3
- Water rides: 4
- Website: parquedelcafe.co

Parque del Café (Coffee Park) is a theme park in the department of Quindío, Colombia, 4 km south-west of the town of Montenegro and 11 km west of the departmental capital city Armenia. The park was founded by the National Federation of Coffee Growers of Colombia (La Federación Nacional de Cafeteros de Colombia) and the Departmental Committee of Coffee Growers of Quindío (El Comité Departamental de Cafeteros del Quindío), and opened on 24 February 1995. It consists of two main areas: by the main entrance are the buildings housing the museum and exhibitions detailing the history, culture and process of growing and producing coffee in the region; and in the valley beyond is an amusement park with rides and shows. The two areas are linked by two gondola lifts and a chairlift: it is also possible to walk between the two areas via an ecological trail that passes through a plantation of many varieties of coffee bushes.

As well as amusement rides the park also offers other attractions such as animatronics shows, a global coffee garden, food stalls based on coffee and traditional Colombian architecture. In 2009 the park received its five millionth visitor and has grown to become one of Colombia's top tourist attractions, with more than one million visitors in 2017.

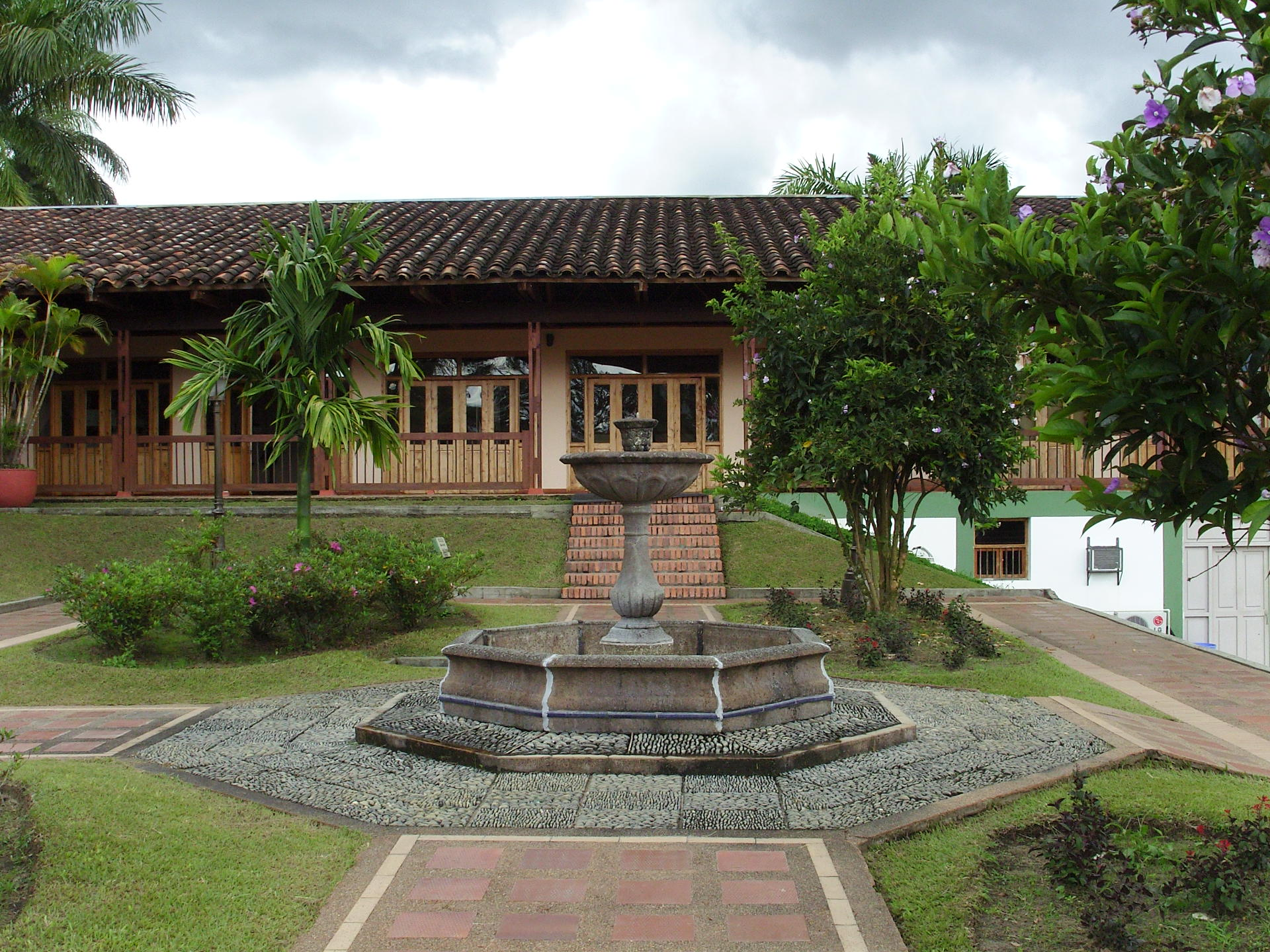
Nacional Coffee Park

== History ==
The idea for a coffee museum came after Diego Arango Mora and his wife Margarita visited the Sugar Museum in nearby Valle del Cauca Department. Margarita remarked that if the country had a museum dedicated to sugar, it should also have one dedicated to Colombia's best known export. Arango, a member of the Departmental Committee of Coffee Growers of Quindío, agreed and contacted Jorge Cárdenas Gutiérrez, the head of the National Federation of Coffee Growers of Colombia, who was also receptive to the idea. When Arango was elected to chair the National Congress of Coffee Growers in 1982, he proposed the creation of the museum, but was told by the secretary of the Congress that he did not have the quorum to pass the proposal.

Over the following years, Arango continued to work toward the creation of the museum, despite lack of financial support from banks unwilling to lend money for an enterprise they saw as non-profitable, and opposition from delegates from three other departments of Colombia who lobbied for the museum to be constructed in their departments, as well from other towns within the department of Quindío itself who objected to Arango's choice of Montenegro as the planned site for the museum.

The museum was finally constructed and opened on 24 February 1995, and drew 250,000 visitors in its first year. However, visitor surveys showed that it was mainly those of 40 years of age who enjoyed the park, while younger visitors and children indicated they would not return. Arango took the decision to add an amusement park to the museum in order to attract the younger crowds. The first attractions were the gondola lift and the steam railway, followed by the roller coaster and other rides.

== Coffee-themed park and exhibits ==
Local culture

- Interactive Museum of Coffee
- The Coffee Show — the history and culture of the region told through music and dance
- Traditional country house
- Plaza of typical Quindian town with traditional architecture
- Cemetery of indigenous tribes
- 18 meter high look-out tower, constructed from guadua

Ecological

- Coffee garden (ecological trail)
- Bamboo forest
- Horse rides

== Amusement park ==
The amusement park contains 27 rides as of 2018. This includes three roller coasters:

- Montaña Rusa (English: Russian Mountain) – commonly called "La Broca" or "the drillbit", this attraction was previously called the Zambezi Zinger at its previous location of Worlds of Fun in Kansas City, Missouri. Originally debuting in 1999, this 1,050-metre long coaster is the longest in Colombia. The name comes from the 1700s–1800s in St. Petersburg, Russia, where some of the earliest-known "roller coaster" experiences were called "Russian Mountains". After gaining popularity throughout Europe, French amusement parks would build their own versions, calling them "les montagnes russes".
- Krater – this Euro-Fighter-style coaster, by Gerstlauer, is based on a similar Gerstlauer ride in Galveston, Texas called Iron Shark. With a full length of 380 metres, this ride features a 30-metre drop, and opened on 24 February 2015 to coincide with the park's 20th anniversary.
- Yippe (English: jeep) – a German-built roller coaster of 550 metres, opened on 23 March 2018. This coaster's name and design pay homage to the Colombian coffee culture, and the Willys Jeeps that have traditionally been used to transport the coffee.

Other rides include Cyclone, drop tower rides, a log flume, two carousels (Cafeteritos Carousel and Children's World Carousel), a Ferris wheel, bumper boats, bumper cars (dodgems), go-karts and a traditional train (with live folklórico music onboard) and vintage-style boarding station.

== See also ==
- Coffee production in Colombia
- Colombian coffee growing axis
- Ecotourism
- Juan Valdez
- List of amusement parks in the Americas
- Quindío Department
