= Black Widow (ride) =

Ride at Kennywood

Kennywood
- Area: Lost Kennywood
- Coordinates: 40.3892288°N 79.8665684°W
- Status: Operating
- Opening date: June 8, 2012
- Replaced: Pitt Fall

Ride statistics
- Manufacturer: Zamperla
- Model: Giant Discovery
- Height: 90 ft (27 m)
- Speed: 68 mph (109 km/h)
- Participants per group: 40
- Height restriction: 52 in (132 cm)

Black Widow is a Zamperla Giant Discovery pendulum ride which is located at Kennywood amusement park in West Mifflin, Pennsylvania. It opened on June 8, 2012.

== History ==
In late June 2011, Kennywood listed its Pitt Fall ride for sale with the International Rides Management brokerage company. On December 15, 2011, Kennywood announced that Black Widow would be added for the 2012 season, replacing Pitt Fall. Black Widow officially opened to the public on June 8, 2012.

== Ride experience ==
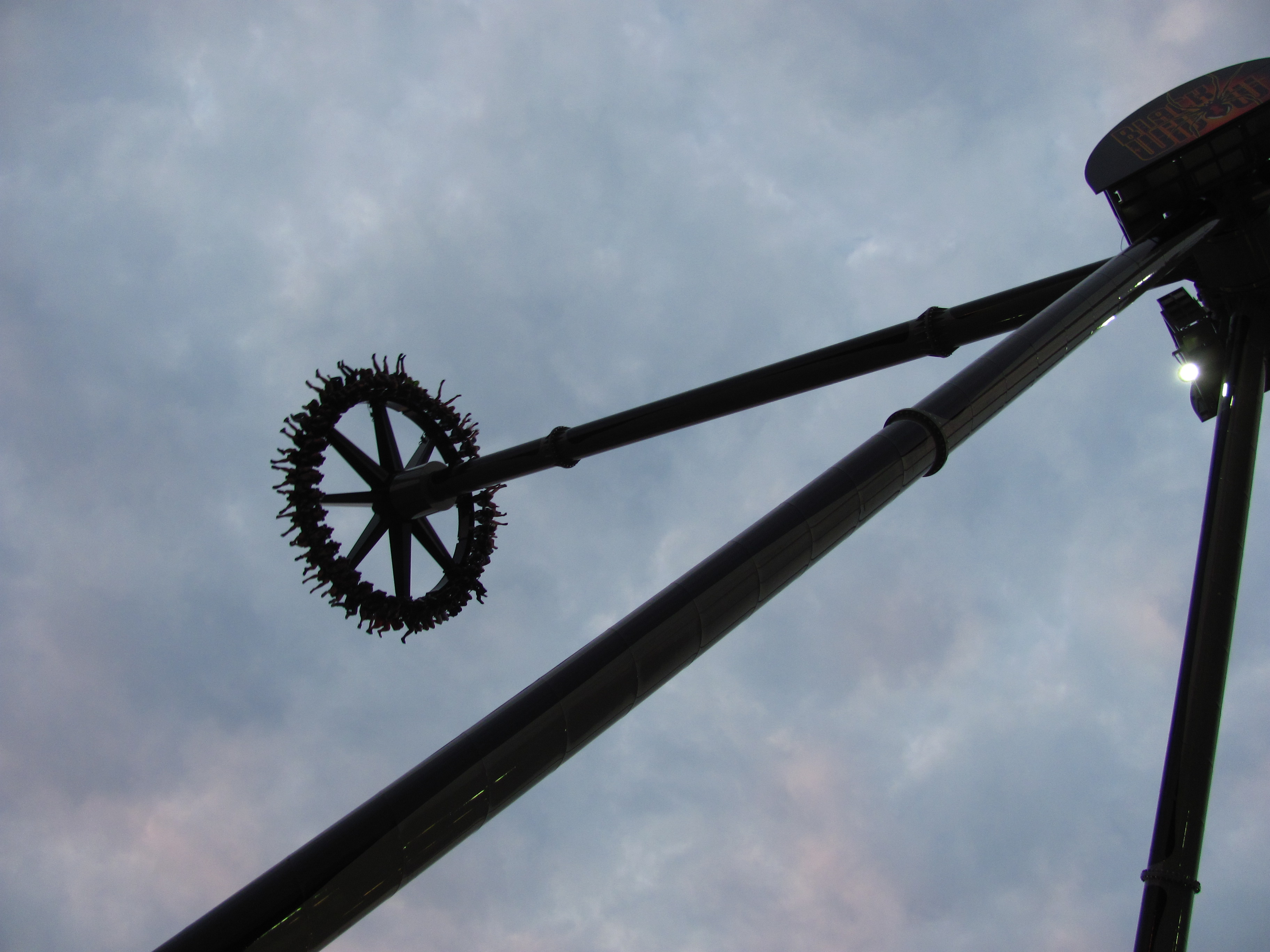
Black Widow

The giant circle swings in a pendulum motion while switching between clockwise and counterclockwise rotations. At the peak of the swing, riders reach a height of 146 feet (45 m) above the ground and experience weightlessness. Black Widow stands at 90 feet (27 m) tall, but reaches a height of 146 feet (45 m) in full swing with an angle of 120 degrees from the center. The pendulum motion propels riders back and forth at 68 miles per hour (109 km/h).

== See also ==
- 2012 in amusement parks
