= Montaña Rusa (Parque del Café) =

Steel roller coaster in Colombia

Parque del Café
- Coordinates: 4.536°N 75.768°W
- Status: Removed
- Opening date: 1999
- Closing date: 2025

Worlds of Fun
- Name: Zambezi Zinger
- Park section: Africa
- Coordinates: 39°10′38.4″N 94°29′20.5″W
- Status: Removed
- Opening date: 26 May 1973
- Closing date: 1997
- Zambezi Zinger at Worlds of Fun at RCDB

General statistics
- Type: Steel
- Manufacturer: Anton Schwarzkopf
- Designer: Werner Stengel
- Model: Speed Racer / Extended Jumbo Jet
- Lift/launch system: Electric Spiral Lift
- Height: 56.8 ft (17.3 m)
- Length: 2,583 ft (787 m)
- Speed: 41.2 mph (66.3 km/h)
- Inversions: 0
- Duration: 2:31
- Capacity: 1,174 riders per hour
- G-force: 2.1
- Montaña Rusa at RCDB

Montaña Rusa (English: Russian Mountain) was a steel roller coaster located at Parque del Café in Montenegro, Quindio, Colombia. Manufactured by Schwarzkopf Industries, the coaster originally opened as Zambezi Zinger in 1973 at Worlds of Fun in Kansas City, Missouri, United States. It operated there until 1997 and was eventually moved to Parque del Café, where it reopened as Montaña Rusa in 1999 until its removal in 2025. The two-and-a-half minute ride featured a height of approximately 57 feet (17 m) and reached a maximum speed of 41 mph (66 km/h).

== History ==
=== At Worlds of Fun (1973–1997) ===
The ride originally opened as Zambezi Zinger in 1973, and operated for 25 seasons at Worlds of Fun, in Kansas City, Missouri.

=== At Parque del Café (1999–2025) ===
Between 1997 and 1999, it was moved to Parque del Café in Colombia, where it reopened as Montaña Rusa. The English translation of "Russian Mountains" refers to the oldest known roller coasters in St. Petersburg, Russia, dating as far back as the 17th century, which were constructed with hills of ice that were reinforced by wooden supports.

Redebuting in 1999 as Parque del Café's first roller coaster, this 1,050-metre long coaster became the longest in Colombia. The coaster was removed in 2025. Its removal left Whizzer at Six Flags Great America in Gurnee, Illinois, as the only remaining Schwarzkopf Speed Racer model still operating.

== New version at Worlds of Fun ==
In 2022, Worlds of Fun announced a new hybrid roller coaster for the 2023 season, inspired by and also named Zambezi Zinger. It opened to the public on 19 June 2023.

== See also ==
- List of closed rides and attractions § Worlds of Fun
