= WildCat (roller coaster) =

WildCat (roller coaster) may refer to:

- WildCat (Cedar Point), a roller coaster that operated 1979 to 2012 at Cedar Point in Sandusky, Ohio which was replaced by Luminosity — Ignite the Night!
- Wildcat, a roller coaster that operated 1970 to 1978 at Cedar Point in Sandusky, Ohio
- Wildcat (Frontier City), a wooden roller coaster at Frontier City in Oklahoma City, Oklahoma
- Wildcat (Lake Compounce), a wooden roller coaster at Lake Compounce in Bristol, Connecticut
- Wildcat (Schwarzkopf), a model series of steel roller coasters designed and built by Anton Schwarzkopf
  - Wildcat (Adventure Park USA), A Schwarzkopf coaster at Adventure Park USA in Monrovia, Maryland
- Wild Cat (Hersheypark), a wooden roller coaster that operated from 1923-1945 at Hersheypark in Hershey, Pennsylvania
  - Wildcat’s Revenge, a hybrid roller coaster originally named Wildcat at Hersheypark in Hershey, Pennsylvania
- Wildcat, a wooden roller coaster that operated at the original Elitch Gardens in Denver, Colorado and closed in 1994.

== Other uses ==
- Ozark Wildcat (roller coaster), a wooden roller coaster that operated from 2003 to 2008 at Celebration City in Branson, Missouri
- Wolverine Wildcat (Michigan's Adventure), a wooden roller coaster at Michigan's Adventure near Muskegon, Michigan
