= Verden Magic Park =

Amusement park in Verden, Germany

- Interactive map of Verden Magic Park
- Location: Heideweg 3-7; 27283 Verden (Aller), Lower Saxony, Germany
- Coordinates: 52°56′3″N 9°16′16″E
- Status: Operating
- Website: www.magicpark-verden.de

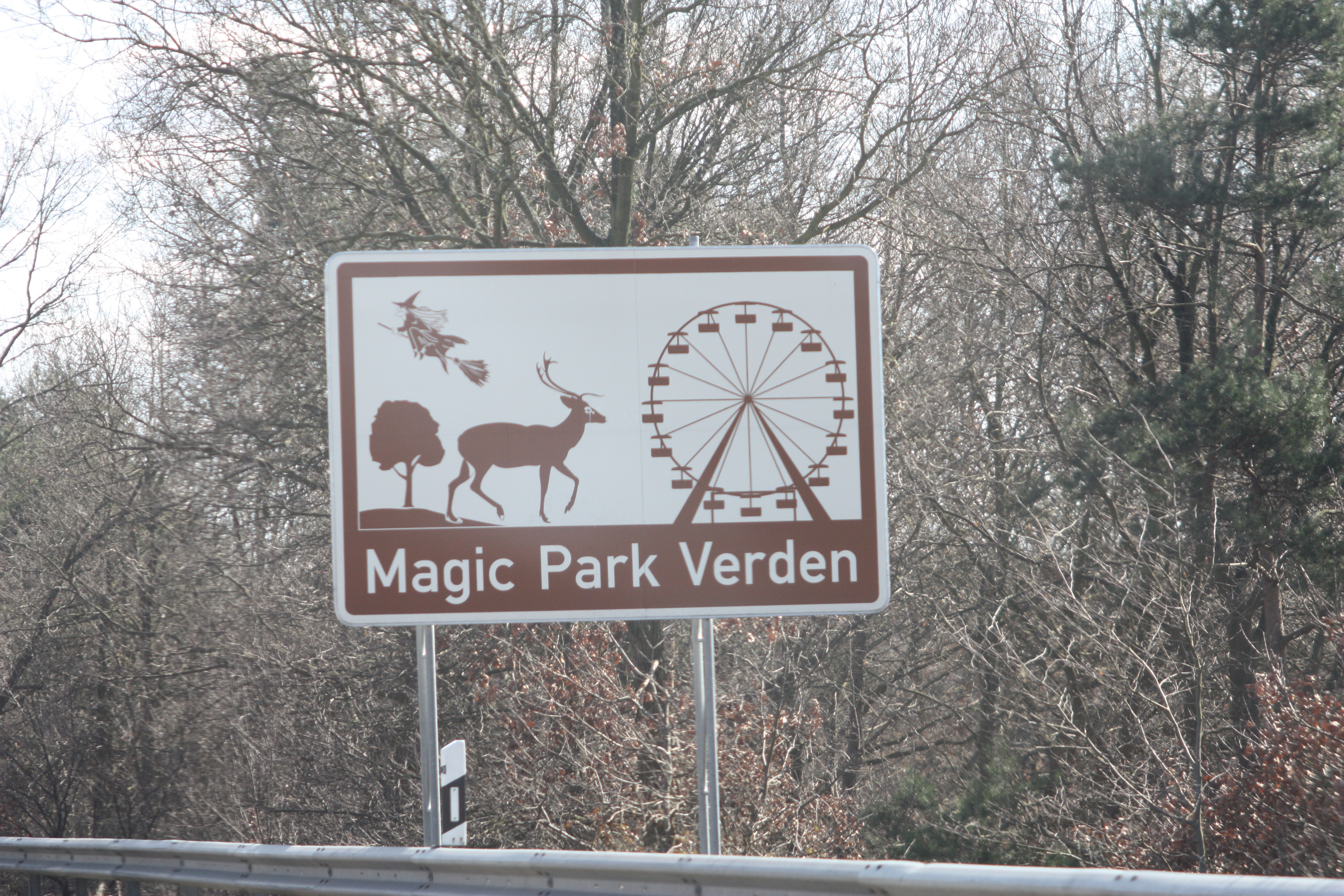
Verden Magic Park sign

The Verden Magic Park (German: Magic Park Verden) is an amusement park in Verden (Aller) in North Germany, which lies on the A 27 motorway between Hanover and Bremen. The park describes itself as "Germany's only amusement park for magic!". Accordingly, it has specialised in the areas of magic and fairy tales. It is also a stop on the German Fairy Tale Route.
