= Racer (Kennywood) =

Wooden roller coaster at Kennywood

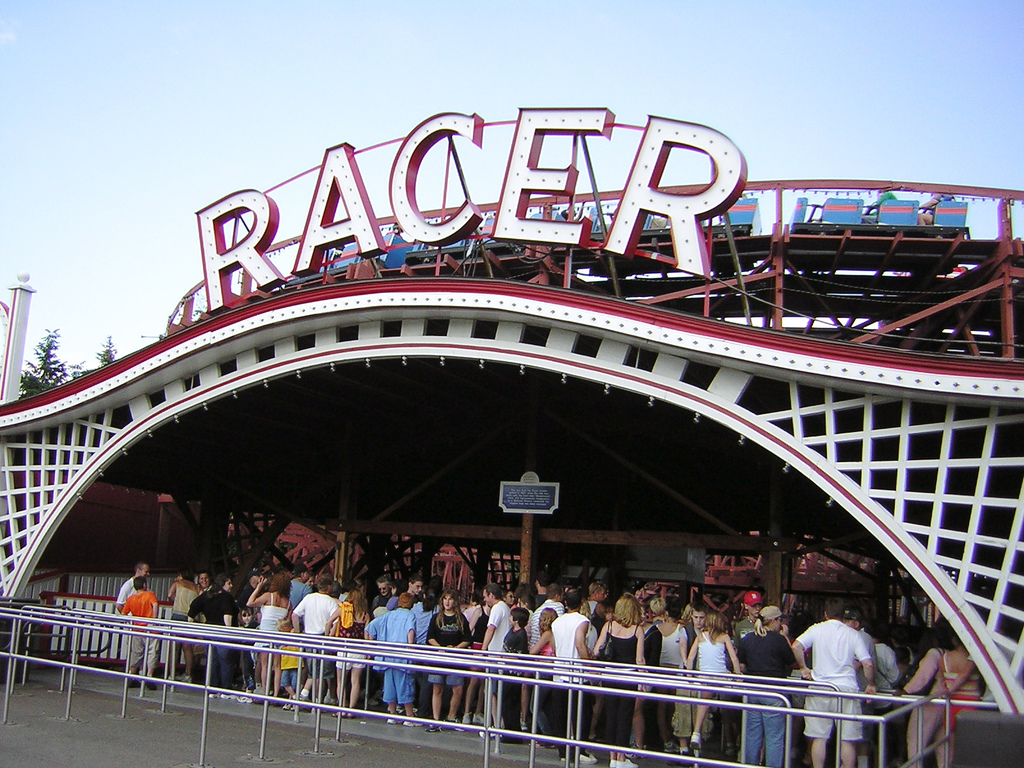

Kennywood
- Location: Kennywood
- Park section: The Lagoon
- Coordinates: 40°23′13″N 79°51′43″W
- Status: Operating
- Opening date: 1927
- Cost: $75,000

General statistics
- Type: Wood – Racing
- Manufacturer: Charlie Mach
- Designer: John A. Miller
- Model: Racing
- Track layout: Möbius Loop
- Lift/launch system: Chain lift
- Height: 72.5 ft (22.1 m)
- Drop: 50 ft (15 m)
- Length: 4,500 ft (1,400 m)
- Speed: 40 mph (64 km/h)
- Inversions: 0
- Duration: 1:32
- Capacity: 1400 riders per hour
- Height restriction: 46 in (117 cm)
- Trains: 3 trains with 4 cars; riders arranged 2 across in 3 rows for a total of 24 riders per train

Pittsburgh Landmark – PHLF
- Designated: 1995

U.S. National Historic Landmark District – Contributing property
- Designated: February 27, 1987
- Racer at RCDB

Racer is a wooden roller coaster located at Kennywood amusement park in West Mifflin, Pennsylvania, United States. Built by Charlie Mach and designed by John A. Miller, Racer opened to the public in 1927 and is one of the oldest operating roller coasters in the world.

The racing-style coaster features a Möbius loop layout, in which both of trains travel along one continuous track. Each train returns to the opposite side of the station from which it began. It is one of only two remaining wooden coasters still in operation with a Möbius loop layout – Grand National at Pleasure Beach Resort is the other.

== History ==
=== Predecessor ===
The first Kennywood Racer was a side friction roller coaster built in 1910 by Frederick Ingersoll. It was a twin-track racing coaster designed by John Miller that cost nearly $50,000. When it was built, it was the largest racing coaster in the world.

The original Racer had two trains which raced side by side on two separate tracks. The wooden coaster lacked underfriction wheels, a limitation of side-friction designs, which resulted in a layout with gentle curves and dips. The trains consisted of three-seat cars with a seating capacity of eighteen. It was demolished in 1926 and replaced by Kiddieland.

=== Modern-day Racer ===
In 1927, a second Racer was designed by John A. Miller and built by Charlie Mach. Because of interest in Miller's previous work, Kennywood hired Miller to build a new racing roller coaster. Park manager Brady McSwigan wanted a "snappy ride that wasn't too much for mothers and children to ride." It cost more than $75,000 to construct. The cost was higher than expected due to issues with topography in Miller's design, which was not as effectively used as it was in Miller's previous installations, such as Jack Rabbit and Pippin.

The Möbius layout is caused by the setup of the station, where the trains turn away from each other upon dispatch. When the trains meet again at the lift hill, they are on the opposite sides from where they dispatched, and the tracks do not split for the remainder of the ride. The updated iteration of Racer added a third set of underfriction wheels, which attached beneath the track, securing the trains in a manner that permitted faster speeds, sharper turns, and steeper drops.

In 1949, Andy Vettel removed the final hill from the track layout. The loading platform's facade was redesigned on two occasions. The first occurred in 1946 and was done by Hindenach. The second happened in 1960, helmed by architect Bernard Liff. In 1990, the facade was restored to its original appearance.

== Awards ==
The nonprofit organization American Coaster Enthusiasts (ACE) designated Racer as an "ACE Roller Coaster Landmark" in June 2010. It is also a contributing structure to the Kennywood Park historic district, listed on the National Register of Historic Places.

Golden Ticket Awards: Top wood Roller Coasters
Year									1998	1999
Ranking									–	–
Year	2000	2001	2002	2003	2004	2005	2006	2007	2008	2009
Ranking	–	–	–	44 (tie)	39	40	43 (tie)	49 (tie)	47	
Year	2010	2011	2012	2013	2014	2015	2016	2017	2018	2019
Ranking	35	43	42 (tie)	35	42	50	43	–	–	–
Year	2020	2021	2022	2023	2024	2025	2026			
Ranking	N/A	–	33 (tie)	41	37	44	39			

Golden Ticket Awards: Most Classic or Distinctive Coaster Station
Year	2002
Ranking	2

== Gallery ==
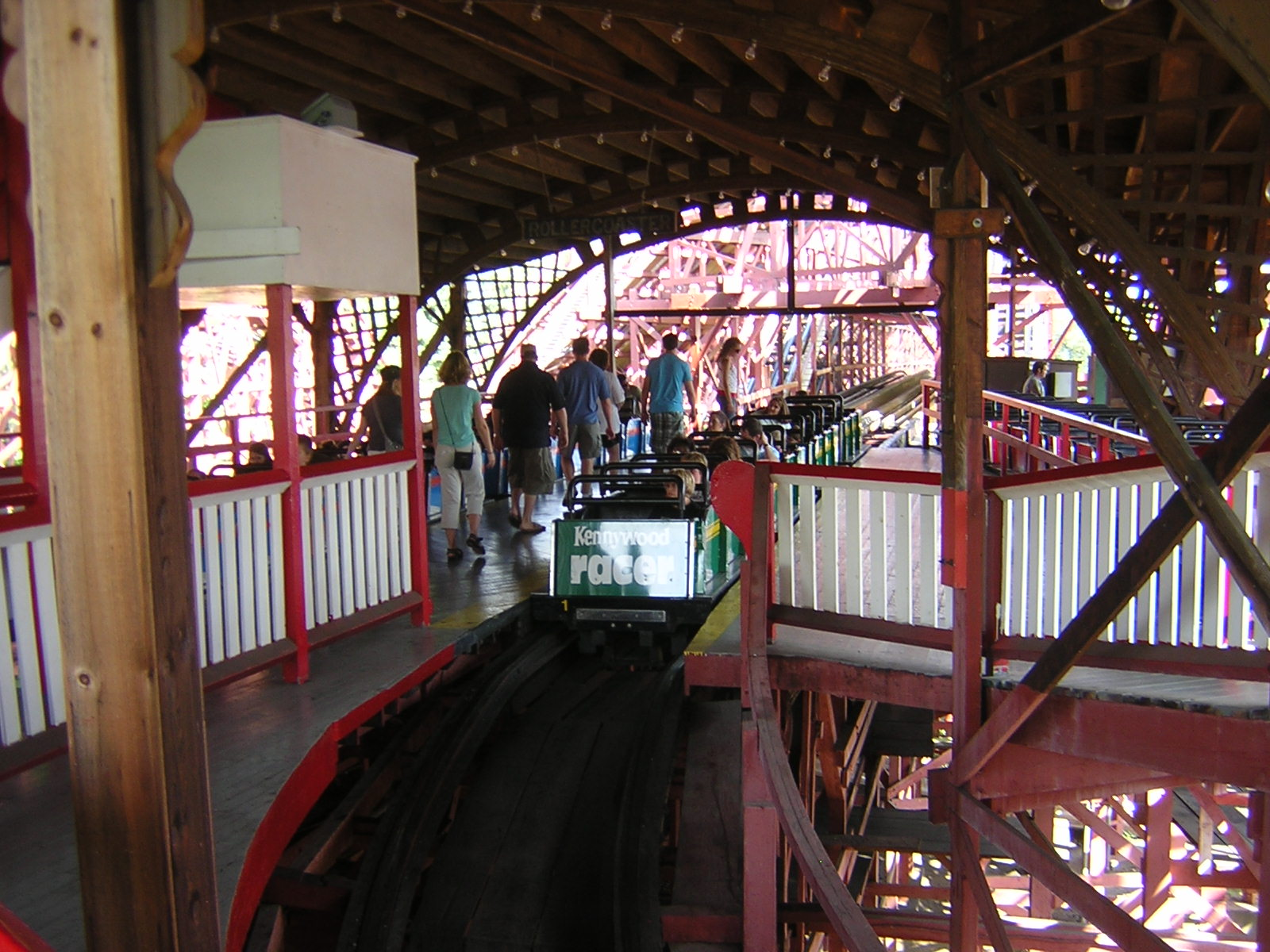
Green train in station

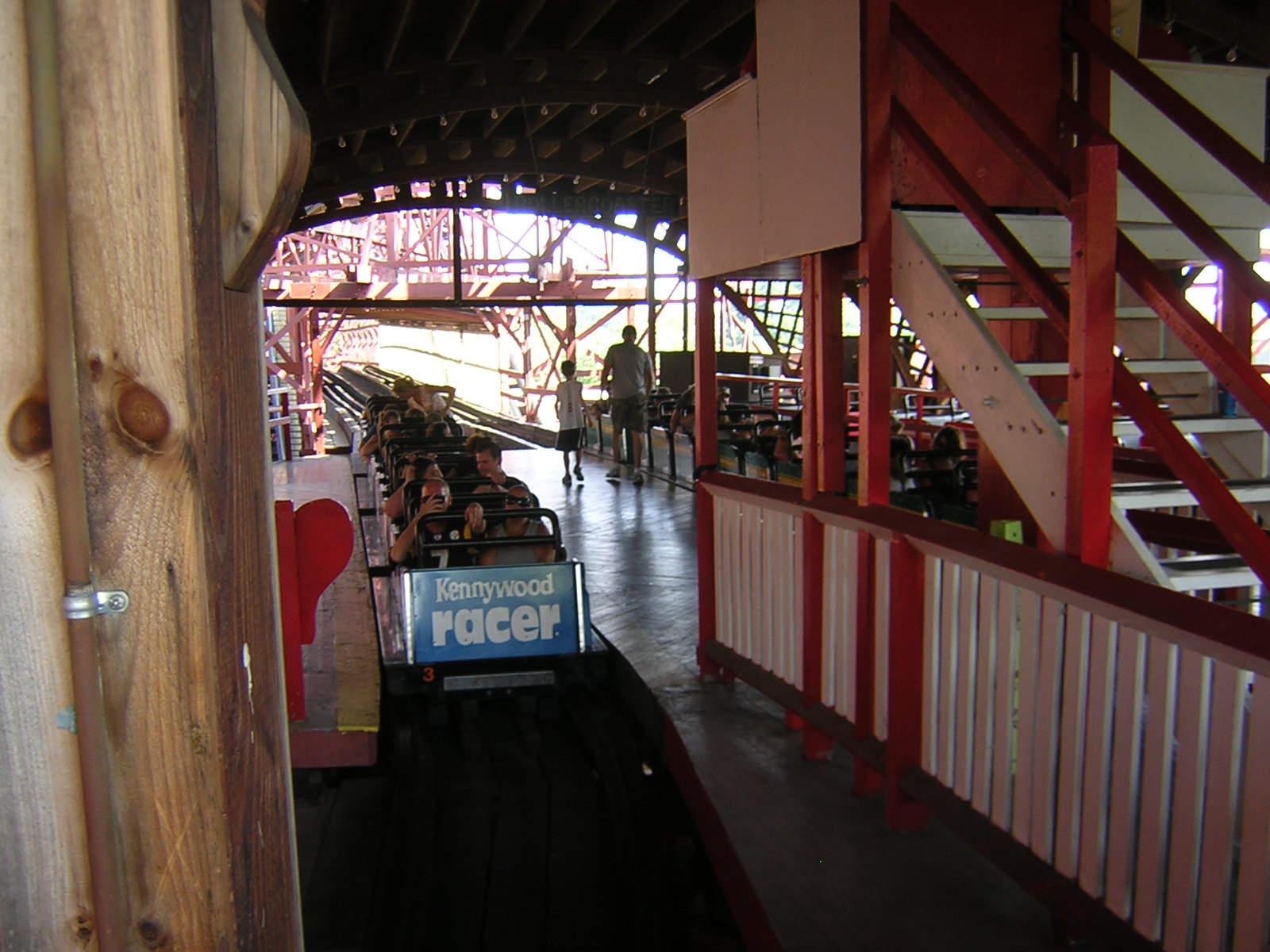
Blue train in station

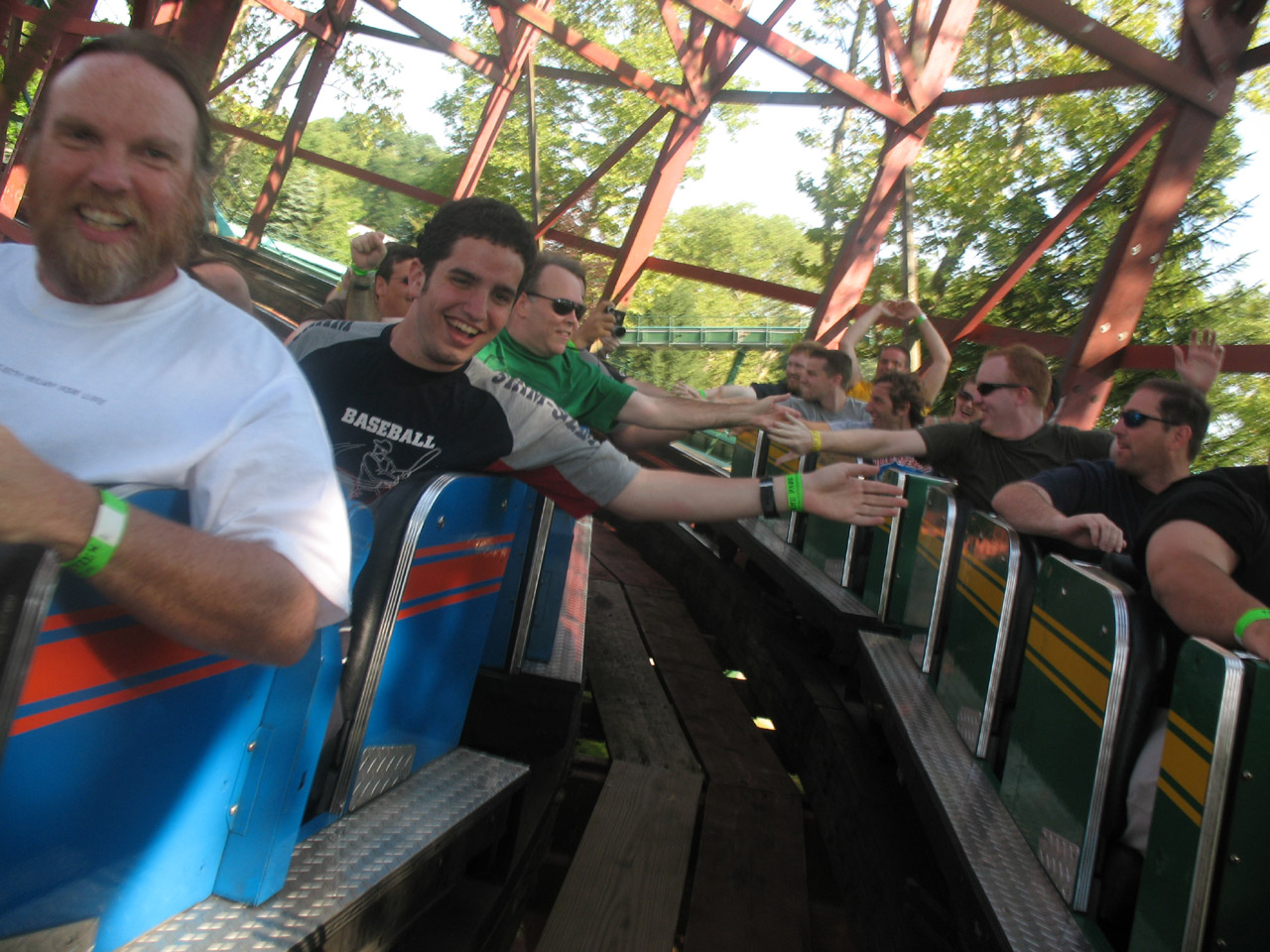
Racer's trains run close together
