= Auto race (disambiguation) =

An auto race is a race involving automobiles.

Auto Race may also refer to:

- Auto Race (Japanese sport), a Japanese version of motorcycle speedway
- Auto Race (ride), an amusement park ride
- Mattel Auto Race, the first handheld video game
