= Reverchon Industries =

French amusement ride manufacturer

- Type: Private company
- Founded: 1927
- Founder: Gaston Reverchon
- Area served: Worldwide

Reverchon Industries is a developer, designer and manufacturer of amusement park attractions that were sold all over the world. Its production unit is still set in the French city of Samois-sur-Seine, near Fontainebleau.

== History ==
Gaston Reverchon, a young coach builder, created his own workshop in the suburbs of Paris in 1929. He adapted the coachwork he used on real cars to bumper cars at a time when bumper cars were nothing more than a steering wheel and a seat attached to a wooden board on wheels. The first Reverchon bumper car had a metallic color and design inspired by the American cars of that period. In 1937, he started building complete bumper car rides including the Télécombat, a ride featuring small military airplanes. After World War II, Reverchon began to provide attractions for distraction-thirsty Europeans. Joined by his sons Michel and Christian, working respectively as designer and technician ("Gaston Reverchon" became "Gaston Reverchon and Sons"), he began a second diversification, designing and producing a full range of complete rides. In 1956, they were the first to develop polyester as part of the bumper cars' coachwork.

- 1950–1971: These two decades marked a golden age for Reverchon, throughout which the company created new rides and improved old ones. The production unit was relocated to Samois-sur-Seine, where 2,000 cars and 50 rides were produced every year and a new model designed every 5 years. In 1971, 270 workers were working in the company.

In 1973, Reverchon presented his two latest attractions: Himalaya and Paratrooper. The public found the rides very fun and the aesthetic pleasing but the rides took very long to set up (3 days for 3 people).

- 1976: In 1976, Reverchon made its first flume ride at Bagatelle Park, in Berck France.
- 1978: Having learned a lesson from 1973, Reverchon launched a bumper car system to be set up using hydraulics. Now, rather than requiring two days for six people, the owner could do the work all on his or her own.
- 1980: Reverchon launched the Explorer ride, a 40-person single, trailer, easy setup improvement on the swing bobs ride.
- 1990: The first Reverchon roller coaster is installed at Le Pal in France.
- 1997: The first Crazy Mouse coaster opens at Dinosaur Beach in Wildwood, New Jersey, U.S.
- 2003: During the 2003 IAAPA Expo, Alberto Zamperla and Gilles Reverchon announced Zamperla would manufacture and sell Reverchon amusement rides worldwide under a license agreement. The first coaster built under this arrangement is installed in 2004 at Six Flags Great America.
- 2005: The Zamperla and Reverchon agreement is dissolved, however and since this time Zamperla continued to build Spinning Coaster with the Reverchon designs. It is virtually identical to the Reverchon model except for the use of individual restraints mounted to the floor of the vehicle – the Reverchon passenger restraints pull down from overhead.

== List of roller coasters ==
As of 2023, Reverchon Industries has built more than 80 roller coasters around the world.

Name	Model	Park	Country	Opened	Status	Ref
Tigre de Sibérie; Formerly Grand 8	Custom Coaster	Le Pal	France	1990	Operating	
Monkey Mayhem	Spinning Coaster	West Midland Safari Park	United Kingdom	1998	Operating	
Crazy Mouse	Spinning Coaster	South Pier	United Kingdom	1998	Removed	
Dizzy Mouse	Spinning Coaster	Wiener Prater	Austria	1998	Operating	
Spinning Coaster	Spinning Coaster	Yokohama Cosmoworld	Japan	1998	Operating	
Crazy Mouse	Spinning Coaster	Hirakata Park	Japan	1998	Operating	
Spin Mouse	Spinning Coaster	Greenland	Japan	1998	Operating	
Crazy Mouse	Spinning Coaster	Steel Pier; Dinosaur Beach	United States	1999; 1997 to 1998	Operating	
Exterminator	Spinning Coaster	Kennywood	United States	1999	Operating	
Roller Boom	Spinning Coaster	Fiabilandia	Italy	2000	Removed	
Crazy Mouse	Spinning Coaster	Brighton Pier	United Kingdom	2000	Operating	
Crazy Mouse	Spinning Coaster	Motor World	United States	2000	Removed	
Twister; Formerly Treetop Twister	Spinning Coaster	Lightwater Valley	United Kingdom	2001	Removed	
Crazy Mouse	Spinning Coaster	Magic World	Italy	2001	Closed	
Flagermusen	Spinning Coaster	Fårup Sommerland	Denmark	2001	Operating	
Crazy Mouse	Spinning Coaster	Allou Fun Park	Greece	2002	Removed	
Souris Mécaniques; Formerly Papillons d'Alice	Junior Spinning Coaster	Jardin d'Acclimatation	France	2002	Operating	
Primeval Whirl	Spinning Coaster	Disney's Animal Kingdom	United States	2002	Removed	
Magic Mouse	Spinning Coaster	Fantasia Luna Park; Funland Park	Greece	2003; 1998 to 2003	Removed	
Crazy Mouse	Spinning Coaster	DelGrosso's Amusement Park	United States	2004	Operating	
Famous Jack; Formerly Ragondingue; Formerly Mouse Trap	Spinning Coaster	Bagatelle; Pleasurewood Hills	France	2006; 2000 to 2005	Operating	
Speed Mouse	Spinning Coaster	Fami P.A.R.C	France	2006	Removed	
Wild Mouse	Spinning Coaster	Plopsa Coo	Belgium	2006	Removed	
Magic Mouse	Spinning Coaster	Brean Theme Park	United Kingdom	2007	Operating	
Bukkerittet; Formerly Crazy Mouse	Spinning Coaster	Kongeparken; Wild West World; Myrtle Beach Grand Prix	Norway	2008; 2007; 1999 to 2006	Operating	
Gold Mine	Custom Coaster	Pirat' Parc	France	2008	Operating	
Crazy Mouse	Spinning Coaster	Lunapark Fréjus	France	2009	Operating	
Crazy Mouse	Spinning Coaster	Dreamland; Brean Theme Park	United Kingdom	2015; 2002 to 2006	Removed	
Crazy Mouse	Compact Spinning Coaster	Coney Beach Pleasure Park; Bundoran Adventure Park	United Kingdom	2016; 2014	Removed	
Boulets de Canon	Junior Spinning Coaster	Kid Parc	France	2016	Operating	
Fantasy Mouse	Spinning Coaster	Fantasy Island	United Kingdom	2017	Removed	
Crazy Mouse	Spinning Coaster	Azur Park	France	2017	Operating	
Crazy Coaster	Spinning Coaster	South Pier; Arcadia City; Plopsaland	United Kingdom	2018; 2014 to 2017; 2009 to 2010	Operating	
Ice Mountain; Formerly Magic Mouse; Formerly Fantasy Mouse	Spinning Coaster	Fantasy Island; Dreamland; Fantasy Island	United Kingdom	2018; 2017 to 2018; 2000 to 2016	Operating	
Pierre de Tonnerre	Junior Spinning Coaster	Parc du Petit Prince	France	2019	Operating	
Wild Mouse	Compact Spinning Coaster	Barry Island Pleasure Park	United Kingdom	2019	Removed	
€uro-Coaster	Gliding Coaster	Wiener Prater	Austria	2020	Removed	
Mouse Coaster	Spinning Coaster	Magic World (France)	France	2020	Operating	
Ratón Vacilón con Gato Comilón	Spinning Coaster	Tivoli World	Spain	2020	Removed	
Dingo Racer	Spinning Coaster - Second Version	Aussie World	Australia	2022	Operating	
RidderStrijd; Formerly Ratón Loco	Spinning Coaster	Avonturenpark Hellendoorn; La Feria Chapultepec Magico	Netherlands	2023; 1999 to 2019	Operating	

== Related News ==
- Firm guilty over park ride death, BBC
