= Kennywood =

Amusement park in West Mifflin, Pennsylvania

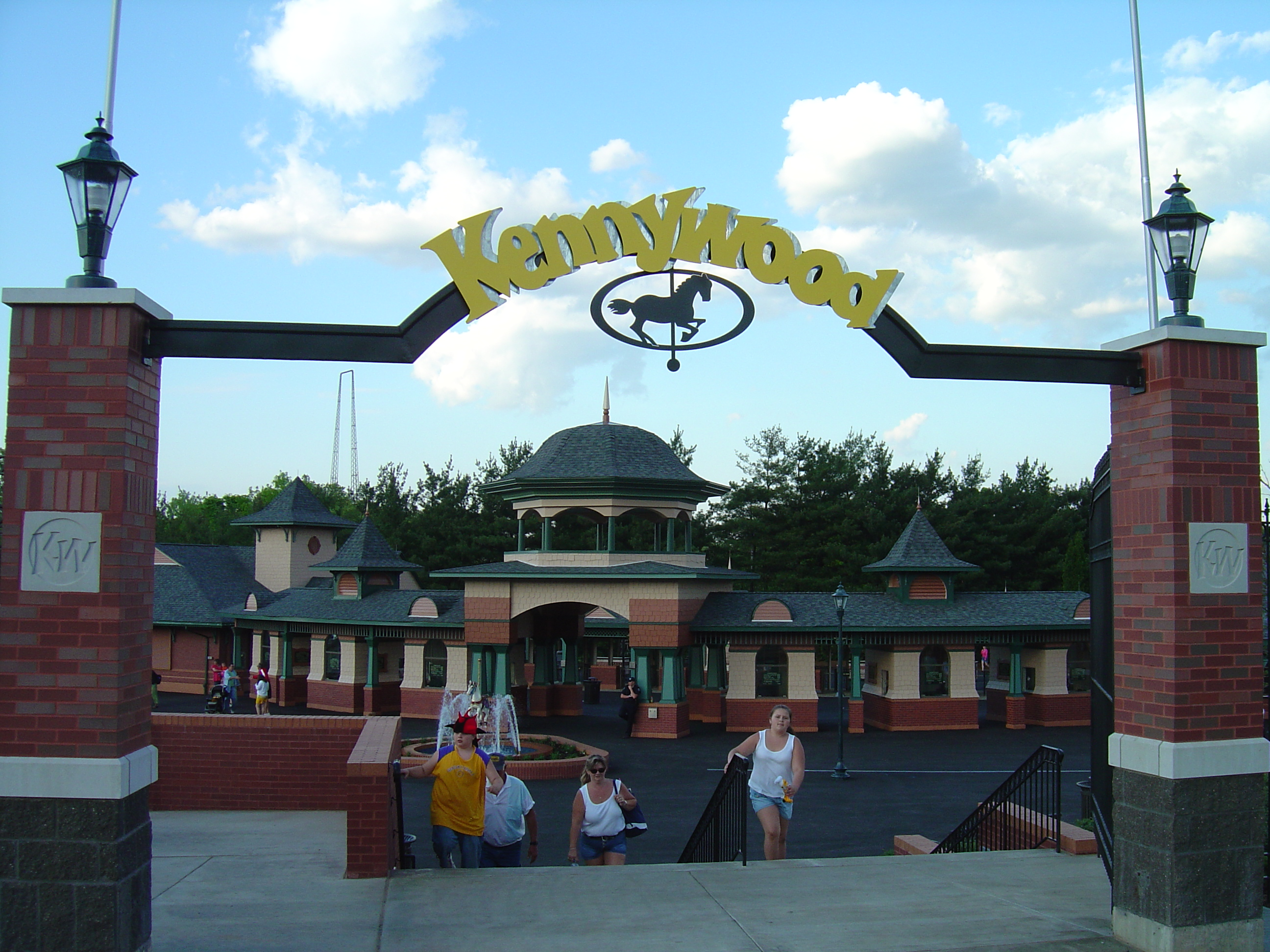
- Main gates to Kennywood
- Interactive map of Kennywood
- Location: 4800 Kennywood Boulevard, West Mifflin, Pennsylvania, U.S.
- Status: Operating
- Opened: May 30, 1898; 128 years ago
- Owner: Herschend
- Slogan: "America's finest traditional amusement park!"
- Operating season: April to December
- Area: 80 acres (32.4 ha)

Attractions
- Total: 45
- Roller coasters: 8
- Water rides: 2
- Website: www.kennywood.com
- Kennywood Park
- U.S. National Register of Historic Places
- U.S. National Historic Landmark District
- Pennsylvania state historical marker
- Location within Pennsylvania Location within the United States
- Location: West Mifflin, Pennsylvania
- Coordinates: 40°23′15″N 79°51′48″W
- NRHP reference No.: 87000824

Significant dates
- Added to NRHP: February 27, 1987
- Designated NHLD: October 9, 1960
- Designated PHMC: August 5, 1992

Kennywood is an amusement park in West Mifflin, Pennsylvania, just southeast of Pittsburgh. The park opened on May 30, 1898, as a trolley park attraction at the end of the Mellon family's Monongahela Street Railway.

It was purchased in 1906 by F. W. Henninger and Andrew McSwigan, both of whom later formed the family-owned Kennywood Entertainment Company. In 2007, the company sold Kennywood, along with four other parks, to Parques Reunidos' Palace Entertainment subsidiary. In early 2025, the park was again sold to Herschend.

The amusement park features various structures and rides dating back to the early 1900s. Along with Rye Playland Park, it is one of two amusement parks in the United States designated as a National Historic Landmark. Kennywood is also one of thirteen trolley parks in the United States that remain in operation.

== Location ==
Kennywood is approximately 8 miles (13 km) from Downtown Pittsburgh, in West Mifflin, Pennsylvania. The park is along Pennsylvania Route 837 (Green Belt), known as Kennywood Boulevard as it passes through the borough. The closest Interstate connection is Exit 77 (Edgewood/Swissvale) on Interstate 376. The Mon–Fayette Expressway will eventually go past Kennywood, which could potentially prompt an expansion of the park when it is completed.

Historically, the park is across the river from the location of the Battle of the Monongahela on July 9, 1755, where British general Edward Braddock was mortally wounded, ending his expedition to capture the French Fort Duquesne during the French and Indian War. George Washington was a colonel to Braddock, and fought at the battle before they retreated. Later the land on the bluff above the Monongahela River was part of a farm owned by Anthony Kenny. Around the time of the American Civil War, the site was a popular picnic grove for locals, known as "Kenny's Grove".

== History ==
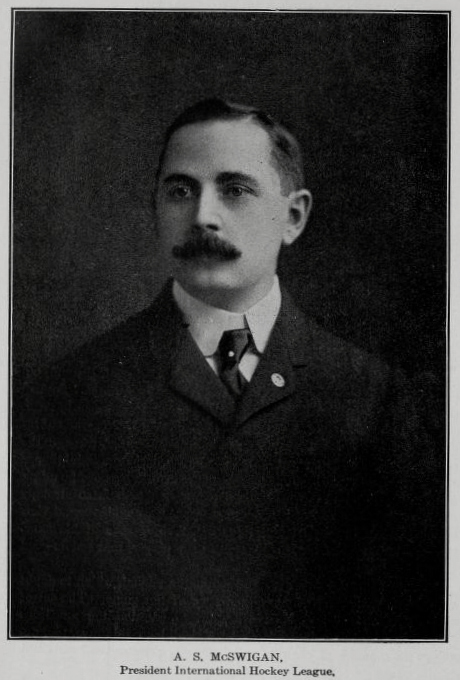
Andrew S. McSwigan

A tree-filled portion of a farm overlooking the Monongahela River near Pittsburgh owned by Anthony Kenny, known as "Kenny's Grove", was a popular picnic spot for local residents during the American Civil War. In 1898, the Monongahela Street Railways Company, partially owned by prominent banker Andrew Mellon, seeking to increase fare profits on the weekends, leased the land from the Kenny family in order to create a trolley park at the end of their line. The company's chief engineer, George S. Davidson, designed the original layout of the park and served as its first manager. A carousel, casino hall, and dance pavilion were added in 1899. A bandstand was constructed in 1900, while the Old Mill was constructed in 1901, and the park's first roller coaster, the Figure Eight Toboggan, was added in 1902.

After less than a decade, the trolley company no longer wanted to manage the park. The standing manager, Andrew S. McSwigan, along with partners Frederick W. Henninger and A. F. Meghan, leased and operated the park as Kennywood Park Limited beginning in 1906.

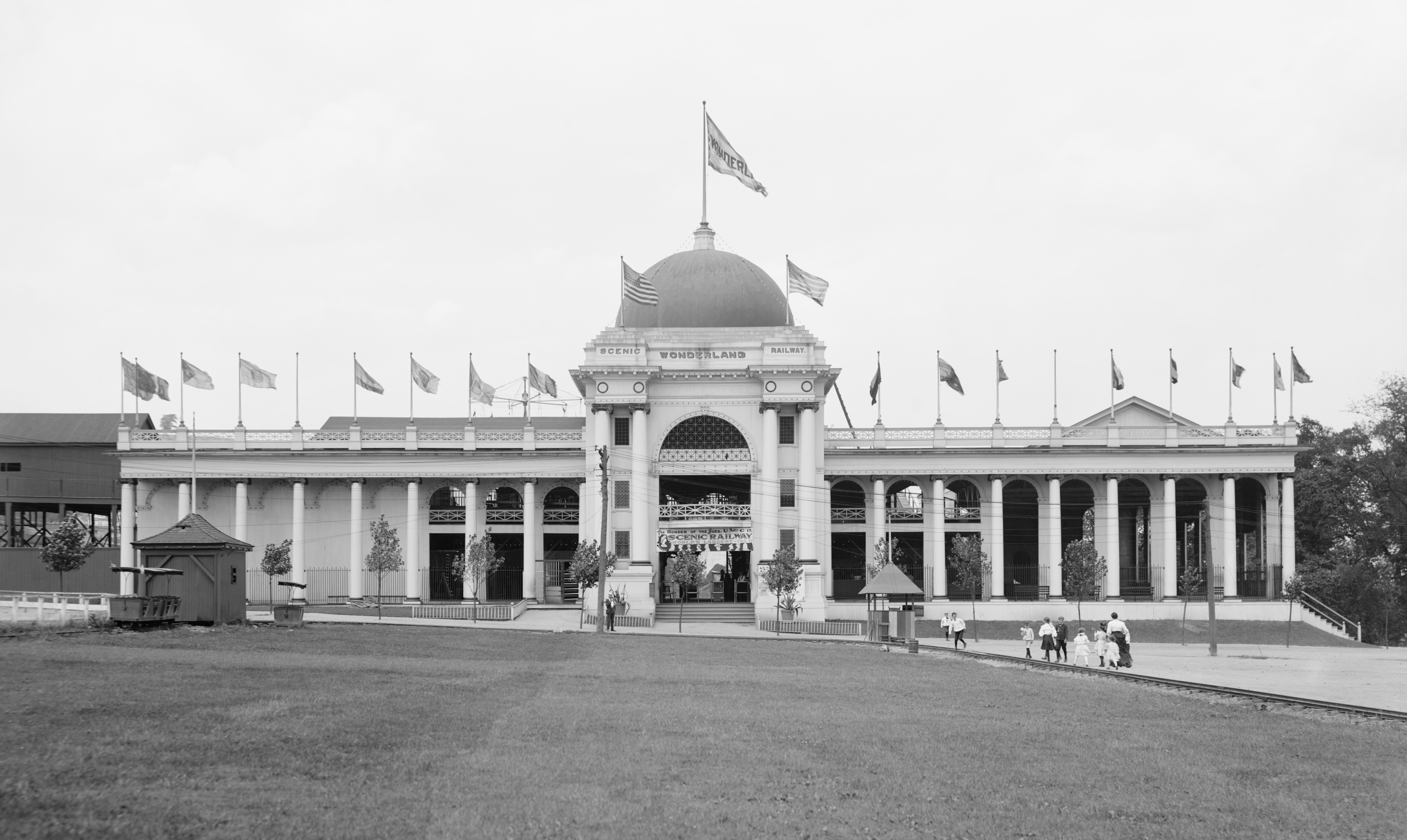
Wonderland building c. 1906

From its origin as a working-class picnic entertainment destination, the park grew in the first half of the twentieth century into a popular attraction that combined thrill rides with recreation venues such as swimming pools and dance halls.

Kennywood ceased to be served by streetcar when Mon Street Railways successor Pittsburgh Railways Company converted the route serving it, the lengthy #68 Duquesne-McKeesport line, from trolley to bus on September 15, 1958.

On December 12, 2007, Kennywood Entertainment announced that it would be selling Kennywood Park, along with four other amusement parks in the Northeastern United States, to Parques Reunidos, a company based in Madrid, Spain.

On March 18, 2025, it was announced that Kennywood had been purchased by Herschend.

Kennywood uses the slogans "Welcome to the family", "America's finest traditional amusement park", and "Make a new memory", although from the 1960s through the early 1990s the slogan was "The roller coaster capital of the world" (a title which is now used by Cedar Point). Kennywood features three wooden roller coasters still in working order (Jack Rabbit, Racer and Thunderbolt), along with three newer steel coasters (Phantom's Revenge, Sky Rocket and Steel Curtain) and one indoor coaster (The Exterminator).

The park holds several events throughout the year, including Phantom Fall Fest.

== Park timeline ==
1898–1949
- 1898: Kenny's Grove purchased on December 18 by Monongahela Street Railway Co.
- 1899: Kennywood Park formally opens on May 30 with a G.A. Dentzel carousel, a dance hall, and the Parkside Cafe
- 1900: Park's first coaster Figure Eight Toboggan opens
- 1901: Old Mill and Casino restaurant open
- 1903: Steeplechase opens
- 1904: Steeplechase removed
- 1905: Dip-the-Dips Scenic Railway opens
- 1906: Figure Eight Toboggan renamed to Gee Whizz Dip the Dips
- 1907: Old Mill is rethemed to Panama Canal
- 1910: Racer opens, Dip-the-Dips Scenic Railway removed
- 1911: Speed-O-Plane opens, fire occurs at the park
- 1912: Panama Canal rethemed to Old Mill Rapids Gorge after being damaged in the 1911 fire
- 1913: Original G.A. Dentzel carousel replaced by T.M. Harton model
- 1915: Old Mill Rapids Gorge rethemed to Old Mill
- 1916: Wurlitzer Band Organ is purchased to provide music for carousel
- 1917: Old Mill is rethemed to Fairyland Floats
- 1919: The Whip opens
- 1920: Jack Rabbit opens
- 1921: Gee Whizz Dip the Dips and Figure Eight Toboggan removed, Fairyland Floats rethemed to Tour of the World
- 1922: Dodgem opens
- 1923: Speed-O-Plane removed
- 1924: Pippin and Kiddieland open
- 1925: Swimming pool opens
- 1926: 1910 Racer removed, The Whip replaced with newer model, Tour of the World rethemed to Old Mill
- 1927: T.M. Harton carousel replaced by William H. Dentzel model while retaining Wurlitzer Band Organ, new Racer debuts, Tumble Bug opens, Kiddieland moved to current location
- 1928: Brownie Coaster and Tilt-A-Whirl open
- 1929: Dodgem removed
- 1930: Auto Race and Laff in the Dark open
- 1931: Tickler roller coaster opens
- 1934: Tilt-A-Whirl removed, Fun on the Farm opens
- 1935: Teddy Bear coaster and Skooter open
- 1936: Noah's Ark and Loop-O-Plane open, Fun on the Farm removed
- 1937: 13 Spook Street and Kiddie Old Mill open
- 1938: Ridee-O opens
- 1940: Rockets opens
- 1941: Daffy Klub replaces 13 Spook Street
- 1945: Olde Kennywood Railroad opens
- 1946: Original facade on Racer loading platform replaced
- 1947: Teddy Bear coaster removed, Jack Rabbit tunnel removed
- 1948: Little Dipper and Tilt-A-Whirl open, Auto Race is renamed Auto Ride, Auto Ride's hills are removed and cars are renovated, Tumble Bug receives new turtle-themed cars and is renamed Turtle
- 1949: Hurricane opens
1950–1999
- 1950: Roll-O-Plane and Loop-O-Plane removed
- 1952: Octopus and Tickler coaster removed
- 1953: Swimming pool closes and becomes U-Driven boat concession
- 1955: Rotor and Kiddie Cadillacs open, swimming pool reopens after renovation and is renamed Sunlite Pool, Daffy Klub removed, Little Dipper renovated and renamed Dipper
- 1957: Round-Up opens, Old Mill rethemed to Trip Around The World
- 1958: Wild Mouse opens, Rotor and Hurricane removed
- 1959: Skydiver, Rock 'N Roll, Twin Ferris Wheel, and Crazy Orbit open, Ridee-O removed
- 1960: Bouncer opens, facade on Racer loading platform redesigned, Wild Mouse removed
- 1961: Bandshell destroyed in fire, Calypso opens, Old Mill receives new boats
- 1962: Kangaroo opens
- 1963: Tilt-A-Whirl removed
- 1964: Tornado dark ride from defunct Freedomland opens, new Round-Up model opens named Satellite
- 1965: Rotor and Popover open, Laff in the Dark and Octopus removed
- 1966: Turnpike opens, Tornado removed
- 1967: Road Runner (Cuddle Up) opens, Ghost Ship dark ride replaces Tornado
- 1968: Pippin becomes Thunderbolt after renovation
- 1969: Noah's Ark remodeled, Loop-O-Plane, Roll-O-Plane, Rock 'N Roll, and Twin Ferris Wheel removed, inner helix "speed hill" removed from Thunderbolt
- 1971: Bayern Kurve and Roll-O-Plane open
- 1972: Le Cachot dark ride replaces Safari, Monster and Rotor removed
- 1973: Gran Prix and The Potato Patch open, Sunlite Pool removed
- 1974: Old Mill is rethemed to Hardheaded Harold's Horrendously Humorous Haunted Hideaway, Crazy Orbit is converted into Space Odyssey, Kenny Kangaroo debuts as park mascot, Monster removed
- 1975: Monster and Log Jammer open (the latter is the first multimillion-dollar ride in park history), Bouncer removed, Merry-Go-Round and organ are refurbished, fire burns down Ghost Ship and Road Runner
- 1976: Tilt-A-Whirl opens, Round Up replaced by Super Round Up, Monster is removed, Skydiver opens as Paratrooper
- 1977: Cinesphere opens
- 1978: Enterprise opens, Cinesphere renamed to Cinema 180, Rockets and Space Odyssey removed
- 1979: Monongahela Monster and Garden Stage open, Skooter removed
- 1980: Laser Loop opens
- 1981: Gold Rusher and Paddle Boats open
- 1982: Pirate and Ranger open, new PTC trains replace Wonder Bread trains on Racer
- 1983: Swing Around opens, Ranger and Loop-O-Plane removed
- 1984: Wave Swinger opens, Swing Around removed, Bayern Kurve is replaced, Dipper removed
- 1985: Raging Rapids opens, Super Round-Up is relocated to Idlewild Park, Roll-O-Plane removed
- 1986: Wonder Wheel opens, Bayern Kurve and Calypso removed, new water features added to Raging Rapids
- 1987: Musik Express opens, Turnpike electric cars added, Kennywood designated National Historic Landmark
- 1988: Flying Carpet and Rotor open, Tilt-A-Whirl relocated to Idlewild Park, Kennywood Memories is filmed and premieres in September
- 1989: Swing Around opens, Monongahela Monster removed
- 1990: Great Balloon Race and Parachute Drop open, original facade on Racer loading platform restored, Laser Loop removed
- 1991: Steel Phantom and Tri-Star open, Merry-Go-Round organ is restored, tunnel on Jack Rabbit restored
- 1992: Tri-Star removed
- 1993: WipeOut opens, Hardheaded Harold's Horrendously Humorous Haunted Hideaway rethemed to Old Mill
- 1994: Skycoaster and Bayern Kurve open, Rotor moved to Lake Compounce
- 1995: Lost Kennywood expansion is built on former location of Sunlite Pool, Pittsburg Plunge, Phantom Phlyer, and Roll-O-Plane open, Great Balloon Race moved to Idlewild Park, Parachute Drop removed
- 1996: Lil Phantom and Kenny's Parkway open, Noah's Ark renovated, Phantom Phlyer relocated to Lake Compounce, Auto Ride renamed Auto Race
- 1997: Pitt Fall opens
- 1998: Kennywood celebrates 100th anniversary, Centennial Midway opens for the 1998 season only, Le Cachot demolished
- 1999: Exterminator coaster opens, Wonder Wheel removed
Since 2000
- 2000: Aero 360 opens, Garfield and Odie become park mascots
- 2001: Steel Phantom renovated into Phantom's Revenge, Crazy Trolley opens
- 2002: Pounce Bounce opens, Phantom Fright Nights debuts
- 2003: King Kahuna (formerly Top Spin from Lake Compounce), Ham-on-Rye Theatre, and Volcano Valley themed area open, Enterprise renamed Volcano, Roll-O-Plane and Miniature Golf removed
- 2004: Old Mill rethemed to Garfield's Nightmare, Bayern Kurve removed
- 2005: New front gates built, free admission and individual pay-per-ride tickets discontinued and replaced with general admission passes, Merry-Go-Round and Wurlitzer Band Organ renovated, Swing Around, Garden Stage, Kiddie Cadillacs, and Ham-on-Rye Theatre removed
- 2006: Swing Shot opens, Flying Carpet removed
- 2007: Cosmic Chaos and SS Kenny open, Gold Rusher removed, park sold to Parques Reunidos
- 2008: Ghostwood Estate and new games building in Kiddieland open, WipeOut relocated to Lake Compounce
- 2009: Bayern Kurve opens, portions of Phantom's Revenge retracked, Turnpike and King Kahuna removed
- 2010: Sky Rocket and Kenny's Kabanas open
- 2011: Kandy Kaleidoscope, Parkside Cafe, and Star Refreshment remodeled, Merry-Go-Round horses and Wurlitzer Band Organ refurbished, Holiday Lights debuts, Noah's Ark rerouted, Pitt Fall removed
- 2012: Black Widow opens
- 2013: Carousel Food Court removed
- 2014: Johnny Rockets opens, Playdium Arcade removed
- 2015: 4-D Theater opens
- 2016: Noah's Ark renovated, Volcano removed, former Lake Compounce Enterprise ride opens and is renamed Volcano
- 2017: Sky Rocket VR experience debuts during Phantom Fright Nights, Floral Clock and Log Jammer removed
- 2018: Thomas Town opens, Olde Kennywood Railroad rethemed to coincide with Thomas Town, Sky Rocket closed for maintenance all season
- 2019: Part of the Steelers Country section opens with Steel Curtain, Sky Rocket reopens, Black Widow is closed for maintenance all season, Pounce Bounce and Orbiter removed
- 2020: The rest of Steelers Country opens with the Steelers Experience and End Zone Cafe, Garfield's Nightmare rethemed to Old Mill, all Garfield theming removed, Floral Clock returns, Black Widow and Steel Curtain closed all season, limited operating hours and Phantom Fright Nights cancelled due to COVID-19 pandemic, five rides removed after the season (Bayern Kurve, Kangaroo, Kenny's Parkway, Paratrooper, and Volcano), Volcano Valley themed area removed
- 2021: Black Widow and Steel Curtain reopen, some attractions remain temporarily closed for the season due to COVID-19, Phantom Fall Fest debuts
- 2022: Phantom's Revenge track repainted, the park begins a three-year celebration of its upcoming 125th anniversary, Kangaroo returns due to popular demand following a renovation, Old Mill receives a new facade, two new seasonal events (Swing Into Spring and Summer's On) debut, Speedy Pass virtual queue system is introduced replacing the previous V.I.P. Coaster Tour system, all attractions that were closed due to COVID-19 reopen except for Skycoaster, the 4-D Theater, and Raging Rapids
- 2023: Spinvasion debuts alongside a new Area 412 themed section, Raging Rapids reopens after year-long renovation, Steel Curtain closed half the season, Aero 360 closed for maintenance all season, Johnny Rockets closes, 4-D Theater and Skycoaster remain closed all season, Elephant Parade and S.S. Kenny removed
- 2024: Gran Prix rethemed and renamed Potato Smash, Aero 360 reopens, Steel Curtain closed for the season for "an extensive modification project", Johnny Rockets replaced with Carousel Burger Co.
- 2025: Thomas Town re-themed to Kennywood Junction, Eggcellent Celebration debuts, Steel Curtain reopens, park is sold to Herschend
- 2026: All-American Summer event is hosted to celebrate the 250th anniversary of the United States

== Recognition ==
For the past several years, Kennywood has been rated the "Favorite 'Dark Attraction Park'" by the Darkride and Funhouse Enthusiasts (DAFE). Kennywood ranked second to Cedar Point in the category of "Favorite Park" in Theme Park Magazine's 2004 Reader's Choice Awards.

The park was designated a U.S. National Historic Landmark district in 1987.

== Attractions ==
=== Named areas ===
- Kiddieland, featuring several child-oriented rides in a compact area located next to the edge of the cliff on the river-view side of the park. It was originally located next to Jack Rabbit before moving to its current location in 1927.
- Lost Kennywood, which was added to the park in 1995. The area references Kennywood's long history, including its short-lived rival Luna Park (1905–1909) and the illusion of old and dangerous rides. The area includes Black Widow, Pittsburg Plunge, The Exterminator, Whip, Wave Swinger, and Swingshot.
- Steelers Country, themed after the local Pittsburgh Steelers football team, and its centerpiece is Steel Curtain, which features the tallest inversion in the world and the most inversions on any roller coaster in North America. Steelers Country was introduced in 2019.
- Area 412, an intergalactic alien-themed area, inspired in name by Area 51 and Pittsburgh's area code. This section was officially established in 2023 with the debut of Spinvasion, replacing the former Volcano Valley area. Area 412 currently includes Spinvasion and Cosmic Chaos.
- Kennywood Junction, which was originally named Thomas Town and themed to Thomas the Tank Engine, opened as an extension of Kiddieland on July 27, 2018. The Thomas Town theming was removed following the 2024 season.
- Kenny Lane, which includes Phantom’s Revenge, Potato Smash, Pirate, and Musik Express.
- Kennyville, which includes Ghostwood Estate, Raging Rapids, Thunderbolt, Turtle, and Noah’s Ark.
- The Lagoon, which includes Racer, Aero 360, Auto Race and Merry-Go-Round.
- Good Time Midway, which includes Sky Rocket, Old Mill, Jack Rabbit and Kangaroo.

==== Former ====
- Volcano Valley was established in 2003, and featured several rides, as well as cement volcanoes that spewed smoke. Volcano Valley was removed in 2020.

=== Roller coasters ===
Kennywood has made use of the hilly Pittsburgh terrain to create coasters with unique layouts. Thunderbolt and Jack Rabbit, both wooden coasters, place the lift chain in the middle of the ride, not at the beginning. In both cases, the train leaves the station and drops into a valley as its first drop. Phantom's Revenge uses the same valley as Thunderbolt, and its second drop passes through the supports of Thunderbolt's first drop, making its second drop the longest and steepest drop of the ride.

Name	Year opened	Manufacturer/Designer	Type/Model	Section	Description
Jack Rabbit	1920	Harry C. Baker and John A. Miller	Wooden roller coaster	Good Time Midway	A wooden out-and-back roller coaster which is one of the oldest operating coasters in the world. Jack Rabbit is well-known for its double dip element, which is a drop that levels out midway before dropping again. It is also among the last roller coasters still in operation that restrain passengers with only a seatbelt.
Racer	1927	John A. Miller and Charlie Mach	Wooden racing roller coaster	The Lagoon	A wooden racing roller coaster built by John A. Miller. The track is a Möbius loop layout, in which there is one continuous track shared by both trains. After returning to the station, each train has traveled half the track and ends on the opposite side from which it began.
Thunderbolt	1968	Andy Vettel	Wooden roller coaster	Kennyville	A wooden roller coaster that originally opened as Pippin in 1924. Following a major renovation, it reopened as Thunderbolt in 1968. A unique characteristic involves its lift hill, which, instead of being located near the beginning of the ride, occurs towards the middle. No single riders are allowed on the ride due to the lateral forces riders experience on the ride's double helix.
Lil' Phantom	1996	Molina & Son's	Moli-Coaster (Low Park Model) (Steel kiddie coaster)	Kiddieland	A kiddie coaster. The park describes the coaster as the "little cousin" of Phantom's Revenge. The ride was renovated before the 2007 season.
The Exterminator	1999	Reverchon Industries	Steel spinning coaster	Lost Kennywood	An indoor spinning wild mouse roller coaster that also features dark ride elements and heavily themed scenery.
Phantom's Revenge	2001	D. H. Morgan Manufacturing	Steel hypercoaster	Kenny Lane	A steel Hyper Coaster model originally named Steel Phantom and manufactured by Arrow Dynamics. It was later renovated by D. H. Morgan Manufacturing, transforming the ride into Phantom's Revenge. The coaster, which makes heavy use of the surrounding terrain, has an unusual characteristic where the second drop exceeds the length of the first.
Sky Rocket	2010	Premier Rides	Sky Rocket I (Steel launch coaster)	Good Time Midway	An LSM launch roller coaster that propels riders from 0 to 50 mph (0 to 80 km/h) in three seconds. It was the first coaster at the park since 1991's Steel Phantom to feature inversions and the first to have a launch since 1980's Laser Loop.
Steel Curtain	2019	S&S - Sansei Technologies	Steel looping hypercoaster	Steelers Country	A record-breaking roller coaster themed to the Pittsburgh Steelers NFL football team. The 220-foot-tall ride (67 m) reaches a maximum speed of 75 mph (121 km/h) and features nine inversions – the most in North America and third most on any coaster in the Western Hemisphere. It held the world record for the tallest inversion at 197 feet (60 m) until 2025.

=== Flat rides ===
Ride	Year opened	Manufacturer/Designer	Type/Model	Section	Description
Aero 360	2000	Zamperla	Hawk 48	The Lagoon	This ride is a modern, open-air version of the park's old Ranger ride and features the Kennywood arrows on the rotating arms. Seated on suspended seats with legs freely dangling, the arms swing back and forth in different directions – higher and higher with each pendulum motion. As momentum builds, the ride culminates by spinning riders the full 360 degrees 70 feet (21 m) through the air. After a few revolutions, the arms pause midair before they begin to spin opposite of their original directions. It reopened in 2024 after undergoing renovations.
Auto Race	1930	Traver Engineering Company	Auto Train	The Lagoon	Formerly known as the Auto Ride, this ride is the last of its kind and was designed by Harry Traver of the Traver Engineering Company. Electric cars run through a trough-like wooden track that twists and turns. When the ride opened in 1930, it had several small hills placed in the track, but these were soon removed to avoid rear-end collisions that were caused when cars could not get up and over them on rainy days. Again to avoid rear-end collisions, the ride was fully computer-automated and the cars slowed down for the 2014 season.
Black Widow	2012	Zamperla	Giant Discovery	Lost Kennywood	The ride seats 40 people in a circle and swings riders back and forth like a pendulum while the disc spins, reaching speeds up to 68 miles per hour (109 km/h). The ride structure stands at 90 feet (27 m), and at the peak of the pendulum's swing height, riders will hang 146 feet (45 m) off the ground. The ride replaced the Pitt Fall drop tower ride.
Cosmic Chaos	2007	Zamperla	Mega Disk'O	Area 412	The ride seats 24 people on a giant disk. Riders sit upon motorcycle-like pedestal seats with back restraints. Arms and legs are free from restraint and the passenger faces outward. To a top height of 50 feet (15 m), the disk begins its flight along the 120 foot (37 m) concave track while its passengers spin around in a circle. The ride was repainted with a new color scheme in 2023 to coincide with the area being rethemed as Area 412 and the opening of Spinvasion.
Kangaroo	1962	John Norman Bartlett	Flying Coaster	Good Time Midway	The last ride of its kind; purchased and opened in 1962. Eight cars travel a circular track with a single steep hill. After "bouncing" off the top of the hill, the cars then make a slow descent in midair back down to the track, giving the sensation of flying. Its resemblance of a kangaroo's leap is what inspired its name. Kennywood announced on November 3, 2020, that Kangaroo would be removed. The announcement was met with outrage from park guests and local media alike, and a petition was circulated to save Kangaroo from removal, which garnered more than 20,000 signatures. On November 19, 2021, Kennywood announced the return of Kangaroo due to popular demand, in which it would be reconstructed for the 2022 season following a refurbishment.
Merry-Go-Round	1927	William H. Dentzel	Carousel	The Lagoon	Merry-Go-Round is a Pittsburgh History and Landmarks Foundation Historic Landmark and is Kennywood's third and largest carousel. Originally commissioned by the U.S. Government for the 1926 Philadelphia Sesqui-Centennial Exposition, it was not completed in time and was purchased by Kennywood instead. It is also the last carousel to have been built by William Dentzel. There are 50 jumping and 14 stationary horses. There are also a tiger and a lion. It is one of four rides at Kennywood with a ride start/stop bell that dates back to the origin of the ride. Music is provided by a 1916 Wurlitzer style #153 Military Band Organ, which is the oldest of its kind in existence.
Musik Express	1987	Mack Rides	Music Express	Kenny Lane	Musik Express is a circular ride that travels clockwise around an undulating track. The ride is themed to 1960s/1970s-era rock music.
Pirate	1982	HUSS Park Attractions	Pirate ship	Kenny Lane	This is a large pirate-themed boat suspended from an "A" frame structure mounted to a trailer. The trailer is hidden behind a retaining wall surrounded by landscaping. The boat swings back and forth until it achieves a height of 60 feet (18 m) and a 75-degree angle, giving riders the sensation of weightlessness.
Potato Smash	1973	Reverchon	Bumper cars	Kenny Lane	Originally named Gran Prix, the ride was added as a replacement for the Skooter bumper car ride. It runs 40 two-passenger cars, one of which, #31, is painted black and gold in honor of Mike Logan of the Pittsburgh Steelers football team, who mentioned the park after the Steelers won Super Bowl XL. Riders steer their cars in any direction across the metal rectangular floor bumping other cars out of their way. In 2024, the ride was refurbished with brand new cars. It was also renamed Potato Smash and features a new theme inspired by the park's Potato Patch fries.
Spinvasion	2023	Zamperla	Gryphon	Area 412	This ride is the first Zamperla Gryphon to be built in the U.S. It is a modernized version of the park's former Swing Around ride. Riders are arranged single-file around a central wheel. As the wheel spins, the seats swing outward parallel to the ground in different patterns, turning the riders sideways. It is themed to an alien invasion and is located in the Area 412 section.
Swing Shot	2006	S&S Worldwide	Air-Launched Screamin' Swing	Lost Kennnywood	One of the first 32-passenger models of the S&S Screamin' Swing to debut. Two 16-passenger arms swing riders back and forth with pneumatic power, reaching a height of 90 feet (27 m) at a 120-degree angle and reaching speeds of 50 mph (80 km/h).
Turtle	1927	Traver Engineering Company	Tumble Bug	Kennyville	This is ride follows an undulating track with six cars that travel counter-clockwise on a circular track over a series of three hills and dips. Originally called Tumble Bug, the ride featured bug-themed cars until it received new turtle-like exteriors in 1948. The Turtle is the only operating ride of its kind left in existence.
Wave Swinger	1984	Zierer	Wave Swinger 48	Lost Kennywood	This ride is a trailer-mounted wicker swing ride.
Whip	1926	W.F. Mangels	16-Car The Whip	Lost Kennywood	The Whip is the oldest flat ride in the park and the last operating 16-car The Whip. Replacing a 1919 12-car model, the current ride's 16 cars travel along an oblong track and "whip" as they go around the bend at either end. In 2002, a park guest was killed when the ride's pavilion collapsed during a microburst. The pavilion was not rebuilt, and was instead replaced with a white wooden fence.

=== Upcharge attractions ===
Ride	Year opened	Manufacturer/Designer	Type/Model	Section	Description
Paddle Boats	1981	Unknown	Pedal boats	The Lagoon	The park's only remaining human-powered attraction. Riders paddle through the park's lagoon in any path they choose.
Skycoaster	1994	Sky Fun 1	Skycoaster	N/A	A 180 feet (55 m) tall giant swing, allowing one to three riders at a time to free-fall approximately 75 mph (121 km/h) above the park's lagoon. This was the first Skycoaster model to be permanently installed in an amusement park. When Skycoaster opened, it was the world's tallest model of the ride. The ride has been standing but not operating since 2019.

=== Dark rides ===
Ride	Year opened	Manufacturer/Designer	Type/Model	Section	Description
4-D Theater	2015	SimEx-Iwerks	4-D theater	N/A	A traditional 4-D Theater housed in what was once the park's Playdium Arcade building. It features various 4-D movies, sometimes themed to certain events taking place at the park. Due to COVID-19, the theater has been closed since 2020.
Ghostwood Estate	2008	Halloween Productions and ETF Ride Systems	Trackless interactive dark ride	Kennyville	An interactive dark ride in which riders can use "ghost blasters" to defeat various creatures throughout the ride.
Noah's Ark	1936	Herbert Paul Schmeck and Philadelphia Toboggan Coasters	Noah's Ark	Kennyville	A walk-through dark attraction. This ride, the last operating of its kind in the world, was remodeled in 1996.
Old Mill	1901	The ScareHouse	Old Mill	Good Time Midway	This is the oldest ride at Kennywood, originally constructed in 1901. It has gone through numerous major theme and structural changes throughout its existence. Various names have accompanied the different themes over the years, including the "Panama Canal", "Tour Around the World", "Hardheaded Harold's Horrendously Humorous Haunted Hideaway", and "Garfield's Nightmare".

=== Water rides ===
Ride	Year opened	Manufacturer/Designer	Type/Model	Section	Description
Pittsburg Plunge	1995	Hopkins Rides	Shoot-the-chute	Lost Kennywood	The centerpiece attraction in Lost Kennywood, this is a Shoot-the-Chutes ride named for the brief period in the 1890s when Pittsburgh dropped the "h" from its name. The ride has three 20-passenger boats, though only two usually operate at a time. Each boat is lifted to the top of the ride by a lift hill before making a 180-degree turn and descending the 50-foot drop and splashing down into a landing pool. The wave created by the boat's splashdown soaks both the passengers as well as nearby onlookers with water.
Raging Rapids	1985	Intamin	River rapids	Kennyville	This ride was opened in 1985 and simulates a white-water rafting trip through canyons and beneath waterfalls. Three pumps are constantly filling the cement trough with 93,000 gallons of water each minute. During the first season, the first holding pool had an operating wave machine. Since 1986, wooden guide rails have sent rafts continuously through the former wave pool without stoppage. This ride reopened in 2023 after some time of refurbishing.

=== Transportation rides ===
Ride	Year opened	Manufacturer/Designer	Type/Model	Section	Description
Olde Kennywood Railroad	1945	Unknown	Miniature train	Kennywood Junction	Originally known as Miniature Railroad. A 3 ft (914 mm) narrow gauge train ride along the top of the cliff at the rear of the park with various displays and a recording that speaks of park history. The locomotives are from the 1939 New York World's Fair, have gasoline-powered engines, and were installed in the park in 1945. Formerly called Journey With Thomas (2018-2024).

=== Kiddieland ===
Ride	Year opened	Manufacturer/Designer	Description
Crazy Trolley	2001	Zamperla	Added in 2001, this ride marked the beginning of a renovation and expansion project for Kiddieland. Placed on a new midway that replaced the Safety City truck ride, this is a miniature version of the park's former Flying Carpet ride. It is themed to the former Kennywood trolleys. Adults are allowed to ride.
Dizzy Dynamo	1970	San Antonio Roller Works	A unique ride, in which riders sit in one of eight cars mounted to a circular platform. As the platform begins to spin, so does each individual car in alternating directions. Finally, the whole ride tilts over. This ride has an umbrella over top of it as well, and adults are allowed to ride. Originally named Mini Bouncer.
Kenny's Karousel	1924	W.F. Mangels	One of Kiddieland's original rides. This miniature carousel pre-dates the park's full-sized merry-go-round. It was refurbished for the 2009 season.
Red Baron	1979	Chance Morgan	A Red Baron kiddie ride loosely based on the story of World War I pilot Manfred von Richthofen. On this ride, children pilot a plane in a circle, using a lever to control the height.
Steel City Choppers	1974	San Antonio Roller Works	Children ride around in a circle on miniature Honda motorcycles. A large umbrella covers the ride.
Turtle Chase	1950	R. E. Chambers Company	A kiddie version of the Turtle ride. While Kennywood's Turtle is the only one of its kind in operation, there are many examples of the kiddie version to be found throughout the United States. Until Kiddieland's expansion, this ride was located next to the Dizzy Dynamo. Adults are allowed to ride.
Wacky Wheel	1924	W.F. Mangels	One of the original kiddie rides, this is a miniature Ferris wheel. It was originally named Kiddie Ferris Wheel.
Whippersnapper	1985	W.F. Mangels	A kiddie The Whip ride. This ride was purchased in 1985 from a park in Oregon to replace the original ride lost in a 1975 fire.
Whirlwind	1984	Zamperla	A kiddie swing ride, although this ride does not lift or undulate. Originally named Kiddie Swings.

=== Kennywood Junction ===
Kennywood Junction opened in 2018 as an expansion of Kiddieland, and was themed to Thomas the Tank Engine from 2018 to 2024.

Ride	Year opened	Manufacturer/Designer	Description
Coal Haulin’ Convoy	2018	Zamperla	A circular track ride. Formerly called Diesel Drivers.
Fire Bustin’ Brigade	2018	Zamperla	An interactive attraction where riders circle a burning building prop on platforms that move up and down as they aim at the fire with water cannons. Formerly called Flynn's Fire Training.
Kenny’s Cargo Drop	2018	Zamperla	A small drop tower ride. Formerly called Cranky’s Drop Tower.
Parker’s Cloud Cruisers	2018	Zamperla	A small Red Baron-type ride. Formerly called Harold's Helicopter Tour.

=== Former attractions ===
Ride	Year opened	Year closed	Manufacturer/Designer	Type/Model	Description
13 Spook Street	1937	1940	N/A	Walkthrough dark ride	N/A
Bayern Kurve	1971–1986 1994–2004 2009–2020		Anton Schwarzkopf	Bayern Kurve	Riders sat in one of sixteen cars that traveled at a high speed around a circular, single-hilled track. Riders started in an upright position and as the cars picked up speed, they tilted inwards toward the center of the ride. There were three iterations of the ride. Kennywood announced the removal of the Bayern Kurve on November 3, 2020. The ride was sold to California's Great America to be used as a parts donor for their Bayern Kurve.
Brownie Coaster	1928	1953	W.F. Mangels	Wooden side-friction powered roller coaster	A wooden roller coaster
Calypso	1961	1986	Mack Rides	Calypso	A spinning ride similar to a Scrambler. Located near the lagoon where Aero 360 is today.
Caterpillar	1923	1945	Traver Engineering Company	Caterpillar	Built by Harry G. Traver of Beaver Falls, PA, the ride's cars rode on an undulating track. One of two Caterpillar rides to have operated at Kennywood.
Caterpillar	1969	1982	Traver Engineering Company	Caterpillar	Built by Harry G. Traver of Beaver Falls, PA, the ride's cars rode on an undulating track. The ride was taken to Idlewild Park after its removal and used as a parts donor for their 1947 model. One of two Caterpillar rides to have operated at Kennywood.
Daffy Klub	1941	1955	N/A	Walkthrough dark ride	N/A
Dipper	1948	1984	Andy Vettel	Wooden roller coaster	Originally named Little Dipper, it was removed to make room for Raging Rapids. The star and moon decals that once adorned the ride are now used on Jack Rabbit's lift hill.
Dodgem	1922	1929	N/A	Bumper cars	Kennywood's first bumper car ride.
Elephant Parade	1987	2023	Zamperla	N/A	A ride reminiscent of Disney's Dumbo the Flying Elephant, which allowed children to fly an elephant using a lever to control the height.
Flying Carpet	1988	2006	Zierer	Flying Carpet	Formerly located where Cosmic Chaos is now, this was a high-speed ride that rocked back and forth. It was removed at the end of the 2006 season after a failed renovation. It was donated to an amusement park in Costa Rica.
Gee Whizz Dip the Dips	1900	1921	Frederick Ingersoll	Wooden roller coaster	Side-friction figure eight wooden coaster, and the first roller coaster to operate at Kennywood. Known as Figure Eight Toboggan from 1902 to 1905.
Ghost Ship	1967	1975	Bill Tracy and Amusement Display Associates	Dark ride	Ghost Ship was the final theme of the dark ride which was located in the 1899 Dance Pavilion building. Early in the 1975 season, Ghost Ship burned to the ground due to faulty wiring. It stood next to the Kiddieland entrance.
Gold Rusher	1981	2007	Maurice Ayers	Dark ride	Originally designed with a spiral lift taking the cars from the station on the ground level to the show scenes on the second floor, the station was rebuilt above the midway where it could be reached by stairs next to the Raging Rapids. It was removed during the 2007 season to make way for Ghostwood Estate. Several of its props have been used during Kennywood's Halloween event.
Kenny's Parkway	1996	2020	CTEC Inc.	Chairlift	A ski lift ride used to transport guests parked in the park's upper lot down the hill and to the park's front gate. In later years, it was only operational on the park's busier days. It was removed in 2020.
Kiddie Cadillacs	1955	2005	Unknown	Kiddie antique cars	A miniature version of the park's Turnpike ride, located in Kiddieland.
King Kahuna	2003	2009	HUSS Park Attractions	Top Spin	The ride consisted of a gondola attached to two arms. The arms rotated in a circle while the platform flipped riders upside down. The ride was built with jets of water that originally sprayed the riders as it spun, but after guest complaints and mold problems, the use of the spraying effect was discontinued. The ride was sold to the same amusement park in Costa Rica to which Flying Carpet was donated.
Laff-in-the-Dark	1930	1965	Unknown	Dark ride	N/A
Laser Loop	1980	1990	Anton Schwarzkopf	Steel shuttle roller coaster (Shuttle Loop)	The first looping roller coaster in Kennywood's history, as well as the first with a launch. The ride was removed after 10 years of operation to make room for Steel Phantom, which re-uses Laser Loop's station. The ride was relocated to La Feria de Chapultepec, a Mexican amusement park, where it operated as Cascabel until 2014, when it was renamed Cascabel 2.0. It closed at La Feria de Chapultepec in 2019, and was purchased by Niagara Amusement Park & Splash World where it remained in storage until 2024, when it was purchased by Indiana Beach, where it currently is in storage.
Le Cachot	1954	1998	Pretzel Amusement Ride Company; Designed by Bill Cassidy; Redesigned by Bill Tracy and Amusement Display Associates	Dark ride	A cross-promotion with a local television show allowed viewers to suggest a name for the ride, and Zoomerang was originally chosen. The ride's spinning function only operated for one season. It was later rethemed as Safari in 1961, and again as Le Cachot in 1972. The ride was demolished in 1998 and its building caught fire during the demolition.
Log Jammer	1975	2017	Arrow Dynamics	Log flume	A fiberglass log flume water ride which ran through the wooded area in the back of the park. It was the park's first multimillion-dollar project, built in 1975 and consisting of two lifts, the first being 27 feet (8.2 m) high, and one leading to the ride's final and biggest 53-foot (16m) high drop. The ride was notable for being the last log flume in existence to have a spillway drop, an element where the ride boat travels down a drop before rising into a brief uphill section. The Log Jammer's final day of operation was September 17, 2017. In 2019, Steel Curtain and Steelers Country opened on the land where Log Jammer once stood.
Monongahela Monster	1979	1989	Eyerly Aircraft Company	Monster	Built on an elevated platform near the park's lagoon
Orbiter	1982	2020	Zamperla	Mini Enterprise	Children rode around in a circle in a helicopter or a robot. The ride lifts and tilts as it operates. Was originally named Mini Enterprise.
Parachute Drop	1990	1995	Venture Rides	Parachute tower	A small drop tower ride with six seats suspended from parachutes. The ride was removed in 1995 to make room for Lil' Phantom, and was relocated to Lake Winnepesaukah where it still operates.
Paratrooper	1976	2020	Frank Hrubetz & Company	Paratrooper	Also called Skydiver, this was the third Paratrooper ride to have operated at Kennywood. It had ten umbrella-covered cars that rotated counter-clockwise on a long arm. During the ride, the hydraulic-powered arm the cars were mounted to raised to a 45-degree angle. Kennywood announced the removal of Paratrooper on November 3, 2020.
Phantom Phlyer	1995	1996	Bisch Rocco	Flying Scooters	Formerly located at West View Park. Relocated to Lake Compounce following the 1996 season, where it is still in operation as "American Flyers".
Pippin	1924	1967	John A. Miller	Wooden roller coaster	The original form of the Thunderbolt roller coaster. It underwent major renovations in 1967 which greatly altered its track.
Pitt Fall	1997	2011	Intamin	2nd Generation Freefall (Drop tower)	A 251 ft (76m) tall drop tower that was the world's tallest drop tower upon its opening. This ride was sold to an undisclosed new owner outside of the United States and replaced by Black Widow.
Popover	1967	1968	Chance Rides	Skydiver	Removed following an incident that killed a 15-year-old girl and injured another
Pounce Bounce	2002	2019	Zamperla	Jumpin' Tower 16 (Miniature drop tower)	A miniature drop tower. The car gently bounced up and down the tower. The tower is themed to look like cheese, and mice appear on the sides. Adults could ride.
Racer	1910	1926	Frederick Ingersoll	Side-friction racing wooden roller coaster	The predecessor to the present day Racer roller coaster. Unlike its successor, it was a side-friction coaster, meaning it had no underfriction wheels and therefore had milder turns and hills. It also had two individual tracks, rather than a single continuous (Möbius) track with two sides. The original Racer was demolished in 1926 and replaced by Kiddieland. The new and improved Racer opened the following year.
Ranger	1983	1983	HUSS Park Attractions	Ranger	N/A
Roll-O-Plane	1950	2003	Eyerly Aircraft Company	Roll-O-Plane	N/A
Rotor	1955	1958	Unknown	Rotor	One of three Rotor rides to have operated at Kennywood
Rotor	1965	1973	Unknown	Rotor	One of three Rotor rides to have operated at Kennywood
Rotor	1988	1994	Unknown	Rotor	One of three Rotor rides to have operated at Kennywood
Row Boats	1899	1980	N/A	Row Boats	N/A
Scenic Railway	1905	1910	Frederick Ingersoll and John A. Miller	Wooden side-friction roller coaster	A side-friction roller coaster
Skooter	1935	1979	N/A	Bumper cars	N/A
Space Odyssey	1959	1980	Eli Bridge Company	Scrambler	Originally opened as Crazy Orbit before becoming Space Odyssey in 1974
Speed-O-Plane	1911	1923	Frederick Ingersoll and John A. Miller	Side-friction wooden roller coaster	N/A
S. S. Kenny	2007	2023	Zamperla	Rockin' Tug	Added to Kiddieland in 2007. This ride was a miniature version of Cosmic Chaos, which was added to the park the same year. As the colorful tugboat vehicle went back and forth on a U-shaped ramp, the boat spun. Adults could ride.
Steel Phantom	1991	2000	Arrow Dynamics	Steel hyper roller coaster	A 160 feet (49 m) tall steel roller coaster with a 225 foot (69 m) second drop into a ravine, four inversions (a vertical loop, batwing, and a corkscrew) and a top speed of 80 miles per hour (130 km/h), which made it the world's fastest coaster when it opened. The ride became known for being a rough and uncomfortable experience. In early 2000, Kennywood announced Steel Phantom would close on September 4. The ride was initially intended to be completely removed from the park, but due to public backlash, the park made the decision to instead hire D. H. Morgan Manufacturing to improve Steel Phantom by removing its inversions, adding airtime hills, increasing its drop height and speed, increasing the track length, and building new trains with lap bar restraints instead of over-the-shoulder harnesses. The ride reopened in 2001 as Phantom's Revenge.
Steeplechase	1903	1904	N/A	Steel steeplechase roller coaster	Six-tracked steel steeplechase coaster with wooden horse-shaped cars
Super Round Up	1976	1985	Frank Hrubetz & Company	Super Round Up	Relocated to Idlewild and Soak Zone, where it is still in operation
Swing Around	1984 1989–2005		HUSS Park Attractions	Swing Around	After initially only operating for a single season at the park, Swing Around returned to Kennywood following a five-year hiatus. It replaced the Monongahela Monster on its elevated platform above the lagoon.
Teddy Bear	1935	1947	Philadelphia Toboggan Coasters	Wooden roller coaster	A smaller wooden roller coaster
Tickler	1931	1952	W.F. Mangels	Wooden side-friction spinning roller coaster	A junior version of a Virginia Reel spinning coaster
Tilt-A-Whirl	1976	1988	Sellner Manufacturing	Tilt-A-Whirl	Relocated to Idlewild & Soak Zone, where it still operates
Tornado	1963	1966	Unknown	Dark ride	Originally located at Freedomland U.S.A.
Tri-Star	1992	1992	HUSS Park Attractions	Tri-Star	Relocated to Idlewild & Soak Zone, where it operated as Trinado from 1998 to 2006. It was then relocated to a park in Costa Rica, where it operated from 2008 to 2013.
Turnpike	1966	2009	Arrow Dynamics and Chance Morgan	Electric cars	An antique car ride formerly located at the front of the park. This attraction originally debuted with gasoline powered cars and was sponsored by Gulf Oil. However, in 1987 these cars were removed and replaced with electric cars manufactured by D. H. Morgan. When it was built, it was a major investment for the park, because the tracks could not be removed and the park owners did not yet own the land the park was built on. It was removed in 2009, though the park stated in an official announcement that plans were underway to bring back the Turnpike within the next few seasons. The Sky Rocket stands in its place, and the ride has yet to be returned to service.
Twin Ferris Wheel	1959	1969	Eli Bridge Company	Ferris wheel	N/A
Volcano	1978	2020	HUSS Park Attractions	Enterprise	This ride was originally called Enterprise until the addition of the Volcano Valley themed area. It had 20 swinging gondolas, which traveled in a circular clockwise motion on a large wheel. Once it achieved a fast enough speed, the wheel raised riders to a 90-degree angle and spun the riders upside down. Kennywood announced the removal of Volcano on November 3, 2020.
Wild Mouse	1958	1960	B.A. Schiff & Associates	Steel wild mouse roller coaster	A steel wild mouse roller coaster
WipeOut	1993	2008	Chance Rides	Wipeout	In 1993, it temporarily replaced Volcano while the latter was being renovated. In 1994, it was a similar placeholder for the Wave Swinger. Then in 1996, the ride found its first permanent home by the entrance to Lost Kennywood. WipeOut was moved to Lake Compounce where it operated until 2020.
Wonder Wheel	1986	1999	N/A	Ferris wheel	Removed to make room for Aero 360

== Incidents ==
- On April 24, 1961, the 64-year-old bandstand burned to the ground, hours after the park opened for the season.
- On May 17, 1968, a 15-year-old boy died on Thunderbolt after falling out of the train.
- On June 19, 1975, Ghost Ship burned to the ground. The fire was later found to be caused by an electrical malfunction.
- The 1986 arrest of a park visitor for drug possession went all the way to the Pennsylvania Superior Court in 1988, which ruled in favor of the park's security force. The defendant had unsuccessfully attempted to have the evidence suppressed.
- On July 8, 1999, 30 guests were taken to local hospitals when an operator of Thunderbolt failed to brake an incoming train, resulting in a collision with a train further along in the station.
- On May 31, 2002, a macroburst hit Kennywood, leaving one person dead. The storm, with winds up to 80 mph, knocked the roof off the wooden pavilion which housed The Whip.
- On September 24, 2022, three people were injured during a shooting inside the park during Phantom Fall Fest.

== Legacy and media ==
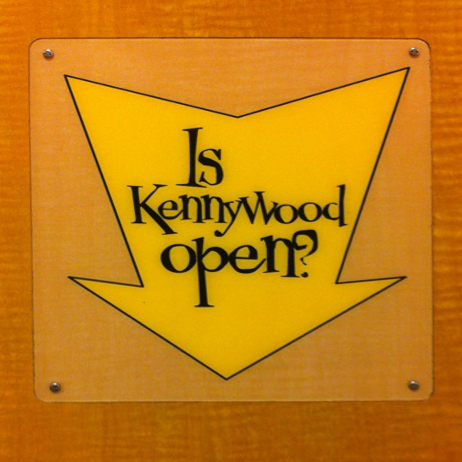
A sign meaning to check if one's zipper is down in a men's restroom at an Eat'n Park near Pittsburgh Mills

Pittsburgh locals have often used the phrase "Kennywood's open" to tell someone that the zipper of their pants is down. The phrase is believed by former American Coaster Enthusiasts president Bill Linkenheimer, himself from the Pittsburgh suburb of Ross Township, to be unique to the park, saying that there is no equivalent for other parks like Cedar Point and Disneyland. The origin of the phrase is still shrouded in mystery, though Andy Quinn, himself a descendant of the McSwigan family which co-owned the park, suspects that it may have started as a joke made by park employees which spread relatively quickly. Some locals recall using the phrase as early as the 1940s.

The park has been present in various pieces of media. In 1988, Rick Sebak made a documentary at the park titled Kennywood Memories, considered a classic WQED film by locals, as well as regarded by the Pittsburgh Tribune-Review as one of Sebak's most popular documentaries. The 2009 film Adventureland was filmed at the park, though its appearance was heavily altered for filming.

In 1987, rock singer Freddy Cannon recorded a remade version of his 1962 hit "Palisades Park" called "Kennywood Park", featuring attractions at Kennywood.

== See also ==
- National Register of Historic Places listings in Allegheny County, Pennsylvania
- Incidents at Herschend parks

== Works cited ==
- Futrell, Jim (2002). Amusement Parks of Pennsylvania. Mechanicsburg, PA: Stackpole Books. ISBN 978-0-8117-2671-9.
- Hahner, Jr., David P. (2004). Kennywood. Images of America. Foreword by Carol O. Hughes. Portsmouth, NH: Arcadia Publishing. ISBN 0-7385-3563-X. OL 5740387W.
