= Swing Around =

Amusement park ride

The HUSS Swing Around is an amusement park ride formerly manufactured by HUSS. It was HUSS Maschinenfabrik's first ride model, debuted in 1969. It is not manufactured by the company anymore, but there are a handful of known units left around the world. The ride rotates in a circle, and the arms swing out, and then come in. They keep on doing this during the ride, in bigger and bigger increments until the very end, where they all swing out, using pneumatic pressure. Most parks require riders to be 42 inches tall to ride; anyone under 48 inches tall must ride with an adult.

== Seats ==
This ride has 14 seats which can fit two people at most. These rides have a metal bar that goes over both, or single riders. Some rides also have a seatbelt for extra protection, and there are no seat dividers.

== Design ==
The ride itself looks circular with the bottom of it smaller than the top. Some installations have lights, but very little theming to them.

== Appearances ==
- Fjörd Fjärlane—Worlds of Fun, Kansas City, Missouri (Sanoyas Hishino Meisho)
- Ricochet—Six Flags Great America, Gurnee, Illinois (Huss)
- Corn Popper—Six Flags Darien Lake in Darien Center, New York (Huss)
- WaveRider—Calaway Park in Calgary, Alberta, Canada (Huss)
- Klockwerks—Canada's Wonderland in Vaughan, Ontario, Canada (Huss)
- Eier Tanzen—Tier und freizeitpark thuele, in Germany (Technical Park)
- Super Swing—Pleasure Garden, in Hitachi, Ibaraki, Japan (Unknown Manufacturer)
- Super Swing—Enakyo Wonderland, in Ena, Gifu, Japan (Unknown Manufacturer)
- Apollo—Śląskie Wesołe Miasteczko, in Poland (Huss)
- Unknown—Mangyongdae Funfair, in North Korea (Huss)
- Swing Up (Traveling)—Various carnivals, Switzerland (Huss)
- Swing Around—Rusutsu Resort in Rusutsu, Abuta, Shiribeshi, Hokkaido, Japan (Huss)
- Swing Around—Toshimaen in Mukouyama, Nerima, Tokyo, Japan (Huss)
- Kabuki Trucks — Sunworld Da Nang Wonders (Asia Park) in Da Nang, Vietnam (Huss)

== Past appearances ==
- Cyclone - Lagoon Amusement Park in Farmington, UT (1985) (Huss)
- Swing Around — Kennywood in Pittsburgh, PA (1989–2005) (Huss)
- Muddin' Monster Race/Big Ol' Trucks - Freestyle Music Park in Myrtle Beach, SC (2008 - 2009) (Huss)
- Apollo—Dorney Park & Wildwater Kingdom in Allentown, Pennsylvania (1984–2024) (Soriani and Moser)

== Successors and similar rides ==
=== HUSS ===
The Bee Bee is a newer version of the Huss Swing Around that is usually themed relating to bumble bees. In this version of the ride, the ride features 10 cars that seat two passengers each which are restrained by an overhead lap bar. The noticeable difference between the Bee Bee and the Swing Around is the Swing Around features 14 cars where passengers are restrained by a lap bar which acts as a handle for passengers to hold onto throughout the duration of the ride.

=== Moser ===
The Dactylus is very similar to the Huss Swing Around except the ride only features eight cars with a maximum lift of 90° that each seats two passengers which are restrained by over the shoulder restraints. The Moser version also moves in a counterclockwise (anticlockwise) rotation, where the HUSS Swing Around rotates in a clockwise rotation.

=== SBF Visa ===
The Airborne Shot operates very similarly to the HUSS Swing Around. The major noticeable difference is the cars where riders are suspended (legs dangling) while seated being restrained by a shoulder restraint throughout the duration of the ride. The Airborne Shot features eight two-passenger open cars with an overall capacity of 16 passengers per ride.

=== Soriani and Moser ===
The Apollo (formerly Apollo 2000 from 1984 to 2006) was very similar to the HUSS Swing Around. However, it is manufactured by Soriani and Moser. The major difference is that there is a globe in the center of the ride and the lap bars are closer to the passengers. One of these was located at Dorney Park & Wildwater Kingdom.

=== Technical Park ===
Technical Park markets their Swing Around ride as Apollo 2000. It features 14 three-passenger cars, which is very similar to the Huss Swing Around, except the Huss Swing Around has cars that only seat two passengers. The cars on Technical Park's Apollo 2000 can swing to a height up to 23 feet (7 meters). The ride also rotates clockwise like the Huss Swing Around. The only noticeable difference apart from the three-passenger cars is the style of the restraint, which is an overhead lap bar, used to restrain the passengers throughout the duration of the ride.

=== Zamperla ===
Zamperla's Gryphon model has a setting that works quite similarly to a HUSS Swing Around, alternating seats from side-to-side, however it only accommodates one person per rider vehicle, unlike other models which usually accommodate two or more, as well as having an over-the-shoulder restraint, while most rides of this type use lap bars.

=== Unknown manufacturers ===
There are many rides that appear to be similar to the Huss Swing Around which currently have unknown manufacturers. These rides operate in the manner of a Swing Around except they possess features, which make them different than the Huss Swing Around such as restraint styles, car shapes, and the number of arms on the ride. The Swing Around rides with unknown ride manufacturers will be given the unknown ride manufacturer title until more information is retrieved.
