= The Exterminator (roller coaster) =

Steel roller coaster at Kennywood

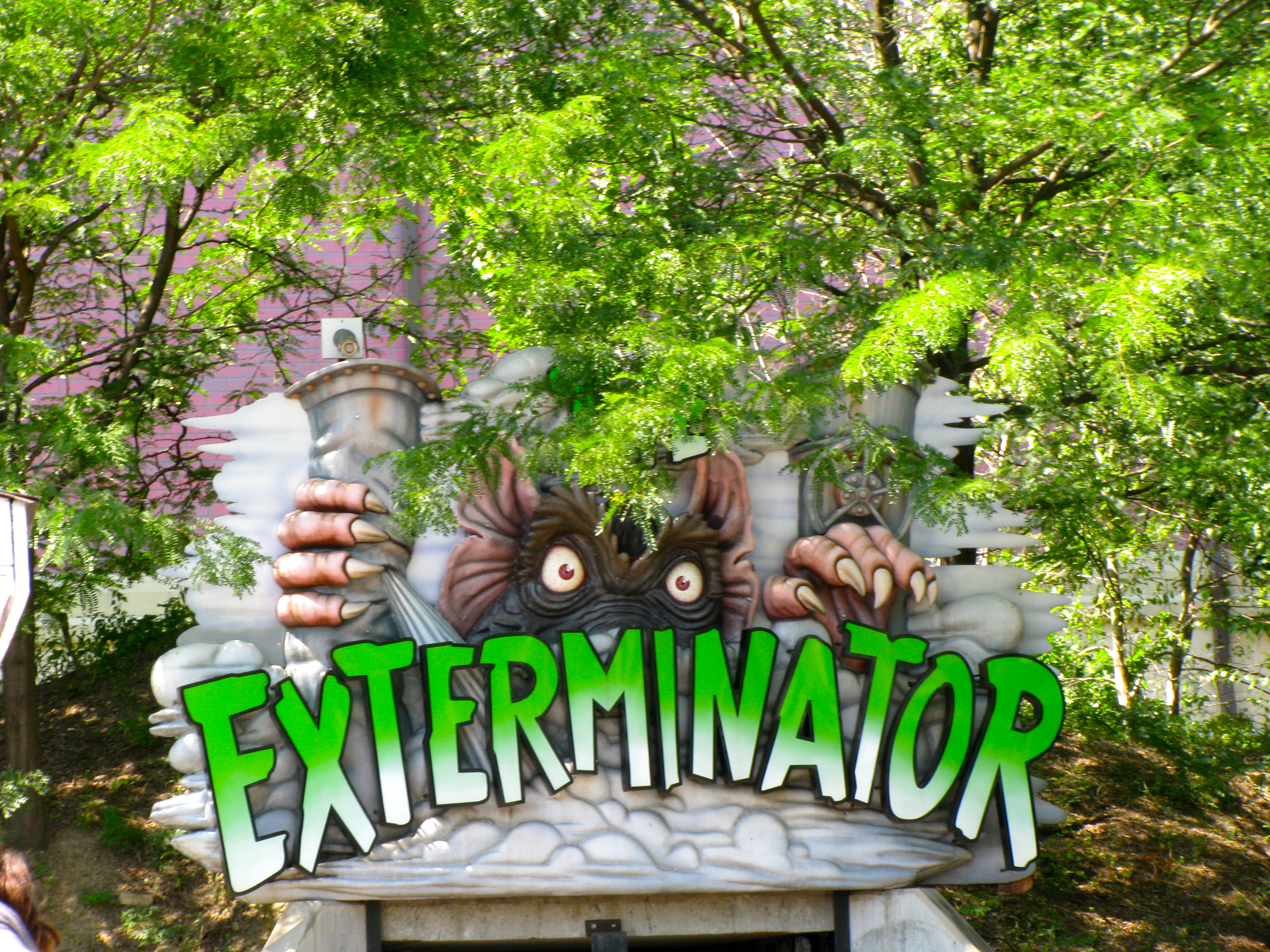
- Entrance to the attraction

Kennywood
- Location: Kennywood
- Park section: Lost Kennywood
- Coordinates: 40.389443°N 79.867657°W
- Status: Operating
- Opening date: April 18, 1999

General statistics
- Type: Steel – Enclosed
- Manufacturer: Reverchon Industries
- Designer: Reverchon Industries
- Model: Spinning Coaster
- Track layout: Wild Mouse
- Lift/launch system: Chain lift hill
- Height: 42.7 ft (13.0 m)
- Length: 1,377.9 ft (420.0 m)
- Speed: 29.1 mph (46.8 km/h)
- Inversions: 0
- Duration: 1:48 (2:30 including start/stop)
- Capacity: 900 riders per hour
- G-force: 2.5
- Height restriction: 46 in (117 cm)
- Trains: 9 trains with a single car. Riders are arranged 4 across in a single row for a total of 4 riders per train.
- The Exterminator at RCDB

The Exterminator is a steel roller coaster located at Kennywood amusement park in West Mifflin, Pennsylvania. The coaster was manufactured by Reverchon Industries. It opened on April 18, 1999.

The ride is heavily themed around the concept of the rider as a rat attempting to escape from exterminators. The concept is a pun on the phrase ''wild mouse", the type of spinning coaster that The Exterminator is. Like other spinning wild mouse coasters, the cars face forward for the first half of the ride, but are free to spin during the second half.

== History ==
In September 1998, Kennywood officially announced The Exterminator as their sixth roller coaster and the park's first indoor coaster, complementing the park's history of iconic dark rides. Described as "a subterranean roller coaster adventure", the ride is fast, rough, includes a few sudden falls, and ends with a fast finale that includes flashing lights and the car seemingly spinning out of control. The coaster itself was manufactured by Reverchon Industries, while the ride's storyline and theming were developed by R&R Creative Amusement Designs. The ride's four exterminator animatronics were designed by Sally Corporation.

The ride held a media day on April 16, 1999 to news personnel and members of roller coaster enthusiast organizations such as American Coaster Enthusiasts (ACE) before officially opening to the public on April 18.

When the park introduced their Speedy Pass virtual queue system in 2022, some of the props in the queue room were removed to make room for a separate line for guests using Speedy Pass.

== Ride experience ==
=== Queue ===
Riders enter the queue line through a concrete tunnel passing underneath the ride's logo. Turning right, the riders walk down a short ramp and then turn left into the main queue room, themed to an underground electrical substation decorated with electrical cabinets, fuse boxes, gauges, and meters. A red button located on the far side of the room can be pushed by guests and after a certain number of pushes, it activates two sirens mounted to the ceiling which light up red and sound a loud buzzer.

=== Ride ===
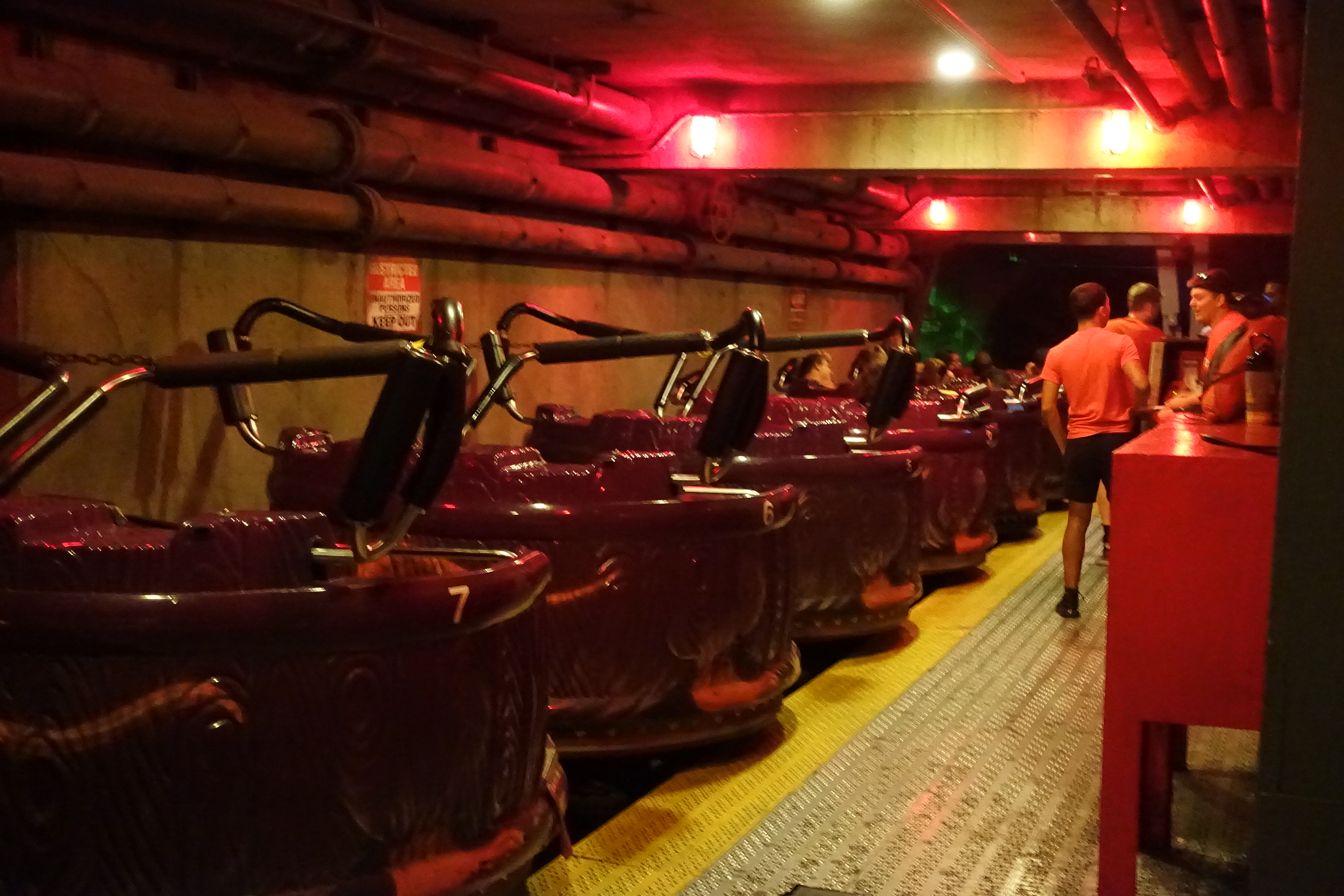
The Exterminator's loading station

Entering the dimly-lit loading station, riders enter the four-passenger rat-themed cars and are secured with a seatbelt and an overhead lap bar. The car is dispatched and passes by a large exhaust fan and a pair of large red eyes staring from a hole in the left wall. Continuing straight down a dark hallway, an animatronic exterminator dressed in a bright orange hazmat suit appears, aiming a poison gas gun at the riders. In the ride's earlier years, the exterminators would blast fog illuminated by green light, giving the riders the illusion of being sprayed with rat poison. The car makes a sharp turn to the left and begins to ascend the lift hill. Nearing the top of the hill, a spotlight reveals another exterminator animatronic standing on the left side of the track, who calls for backup into his radio.

The car crests the top of the hill and makes a sharp turn to the left into a straightaway where another exterminator waits at the end of the hall and tries to blast the riders as the car makes a U-turn. Making another U-turn, the car rolls toward a large electrical transformer, which the car swerves away from with a hairpin turn. After navigating another hairpin turn, the car passes under a sign reading "Danger - Boiler Room". The car then makes a sharp left turn into the ride's first drop into a large boiler room, passing by a giant furnace.

The car rises again, making two more left turns into its biggest drop. The car ascends into a double-up and encounters another exterminator animatronic as it takes a left turn into another hallway. At the end of the hall is a large mirror that creates an illusion of colliding with another car. As the car makes another U-turn, the spin lock mechanism on the car disengages, allowing the car to spin freely. The car spins out of control through three hairpin turns in pitch darkness before emerging at the gates of the giant furnace. The car enters the furnace illuminated by bright red lights, completing a wide turn, before exiting the furnace into a sudden dip and a final "bunny hop" hill. The car turns left into the final brake run in the station, slowing down and re-locking the spinning mechanism.
