= Thunderbolt (Kennywood) =

Wooden roller coaster at Kennywood

- Previously known as Pippin (1924–1967)
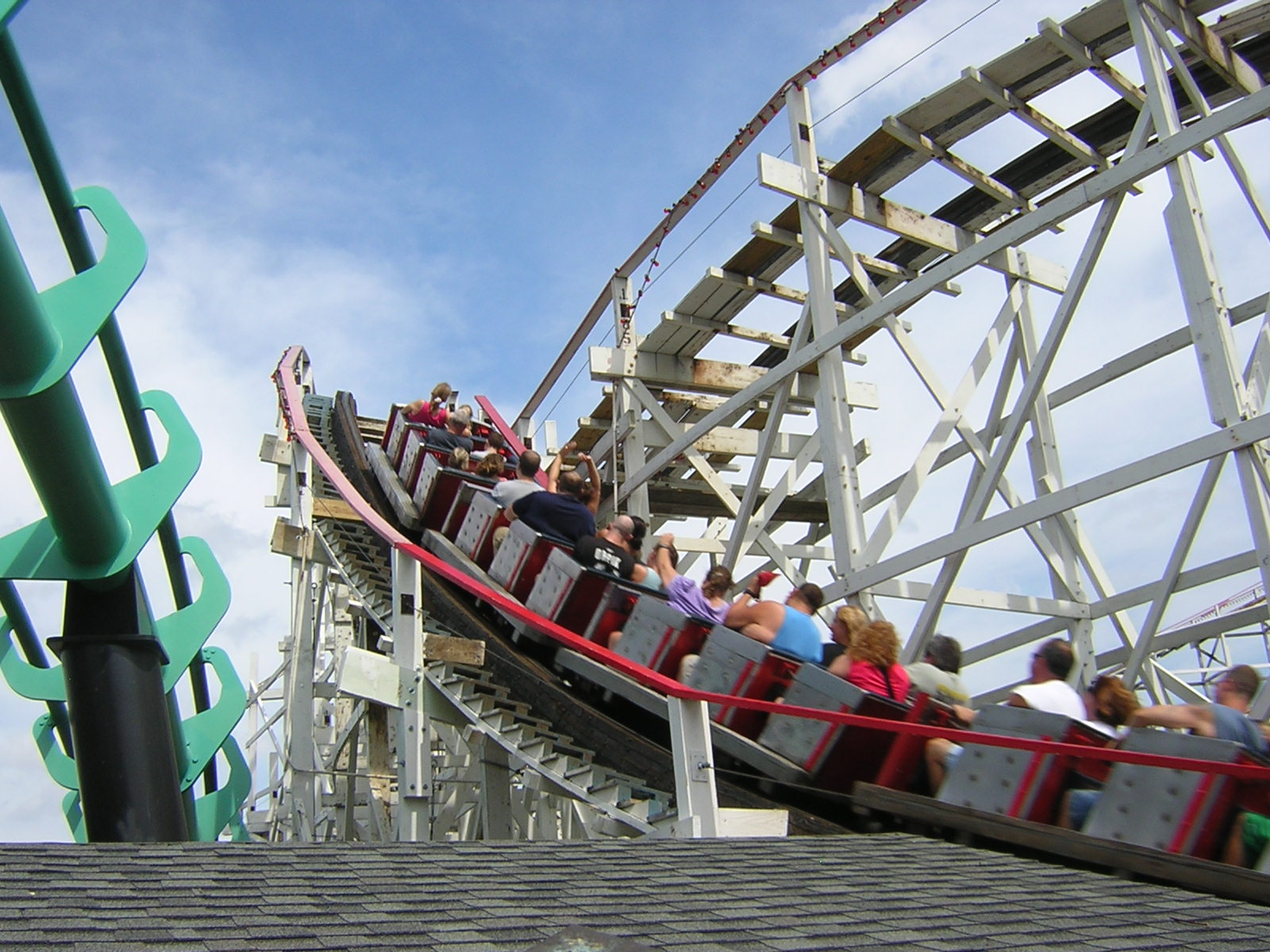
- Kennywood's Thunderbolt

Kennywood
- Location: Kennywood
- Park section: Kennyville
- Coordinates: 40°23′20″N 79°51′54″W
- Status: Operating
- Opening date: 1968
- Replaced: Pippin

General statistics
- Type: Wood
- Designer: Andy Vettel (1968); John A. Miller (1924)
- Track layout: Terrain
- Lift/launch system: Chain lift hill
- Height: 70 ft (21 m)
- Drop: 90 ft (27 m)
- Length: 3,250 ft (990 m)
- Speed: 55 mph (89 km/h)
- Inversions: 0
- Duration: 1:41
- Height restriction: 52 in (132 cm)
- Trains: 3 trains with 4 cars; riders arranged 2 across in 3 rows for a total of 24 riders per train
- Website: Official website
- Thunderbolt at RCDB

Thunderbolt is a wooden roller coaster located at Kennywood amusement park in West Mifflin, Pennsylvania, United States. The original version of the historic coaster opened as Pippin in 1924 and was designed by John A. Miller. The park hired Andy Vettel to renovate and expand the original layout, and it reopened to the public as Thunderbolt in 1968. Thunderbolt consistently ranks as one of the top 50 wooden coasters in the world by Amusement Today in their annual Golden Ticket Awards publication.

== History ==
In 1924, Kennywood debuted Pippin, a roller coaster designed by renowned coaster architect John A. Miller. The original trains, built by Miller and Baker, were replaced by Century Flyer trains from the National Amusement Device Company in 1958.

Kennywood hired Andy Vettel in the late 1960s to renovate Pippin and expand its layout. Most of the layout was left intact and refurbished, while some elements were removed to accommodate a new set of helix hills. The four original drops into the ravine were retained. The refurbished coaster reopened as Thunderbolt for the 1968 season. The following year, a small speed hill was removed from the inner helix near the loading station.

A 1974 New York Times article rated Thunderbolt as the top roller coaster in the US. In 1991, the tunnel located at the end of the first dip was removed to allow riders a view of the new Steel Phantom, and for Kennywood's 100th anniversary in 1998, headlights on the front of each train were restored during a refurbishment.

=== Incidents ===
On May 16, 1968, a 15-year-old boy from Greensburg died after a fall from the roller coaster. The exact cause of death was stated to be under investigation but has never been confirmed.

In 1999, an accident occurred when operators failed to brake the train coming into the station, causing a collision with the train being loaded. Thirty people were injured in the crash. After the accident, the headlights on the trains were removed due to damage sustained.

== Ride experience ==
Thunderbolt follows the surrounding terrain with a track length of 3,250 feet (990 m). Its maximum height is 70 feet (21 m), but because of the track layout and the natural ravines, the maximum drop is 90 feet (27 m). Reaching a maximum speed of 55 mph (89 km/h), the ride takes 1 minute and 40 seconds to complete its circuit.

A unique feature of Thunderbolt is that after departing from the station, the train does not immediately ascend the lift hill like most coasters. Instead, it enters the first drop, with the lift hill being located in the middle of the ride after the second drop. After the lift hill, riders descend a 90 ft (27 m) long drop. After this drop is a tight bend which results in the rider on the right being pushed into the rider on the left due to the lack of a seat divider. After this, riders experience several turns and hills before returning to the station.

== Awards and rankings ==
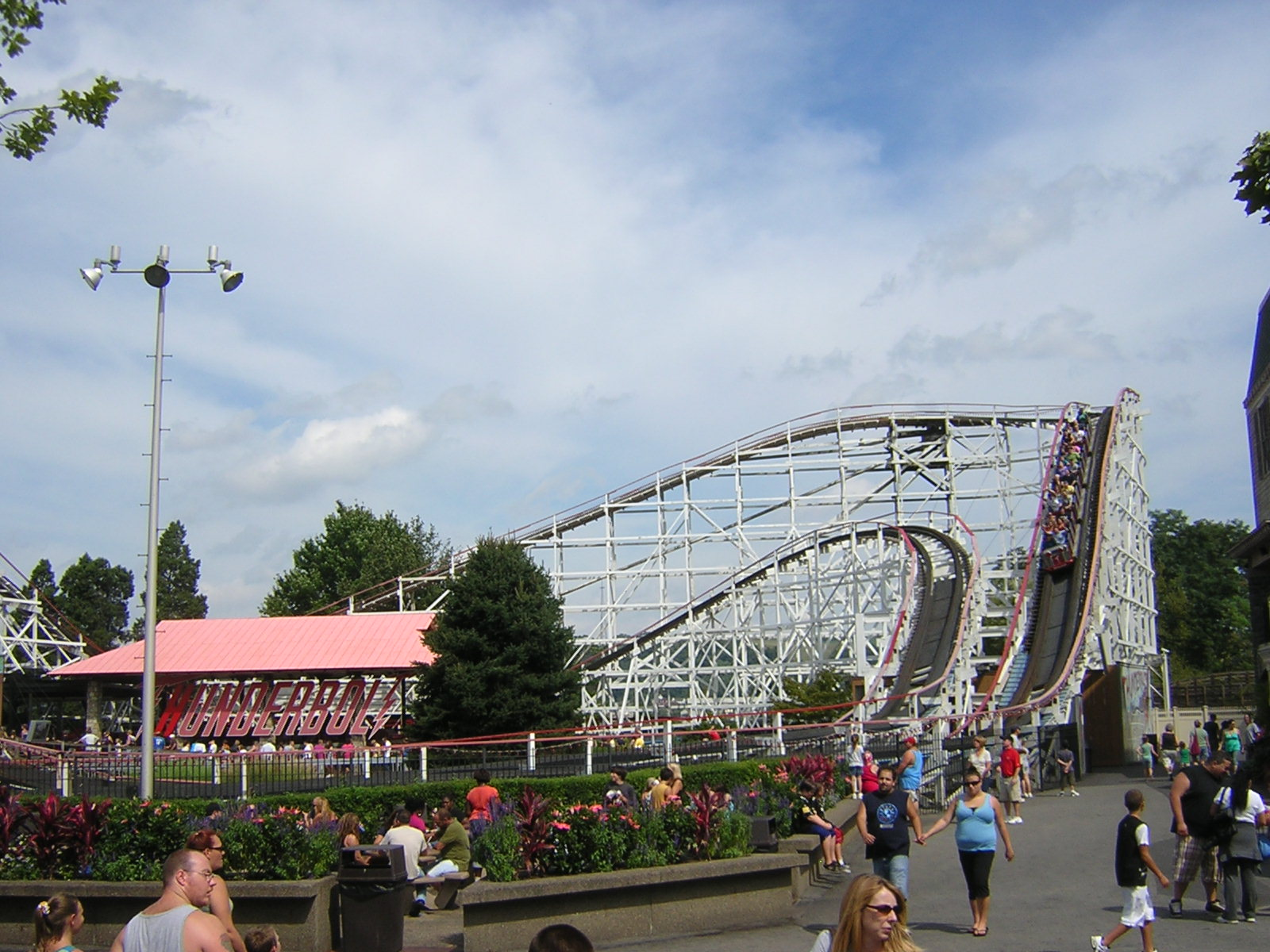
Thunderbolt's lift hill

Thunderbolt is an ACE Coaster Classic and Coaster Landmark.

Golden Ticket Awards: Top wood Roller Coasters
Year									1998	1999
Ranking									9	11
Year	2000	2001	2002	2003	2004	2005	2006	2007	2008	2009
Ranking	14	14	15	19	18	22	19	21	19	23
Year	2010	2011	2012	2013	2014	2015	2016	2017	2018	2019
Ranking	14	14	15	15	14	15	21	17	15	18
Year	2020	2021	2022	2023	2024	2025	2026			
Ranking	N/A	19	20	18	21	27	30			

NAPHA Survey: Favorite Wood Roller Coaster
Year	2005
Ranking	4

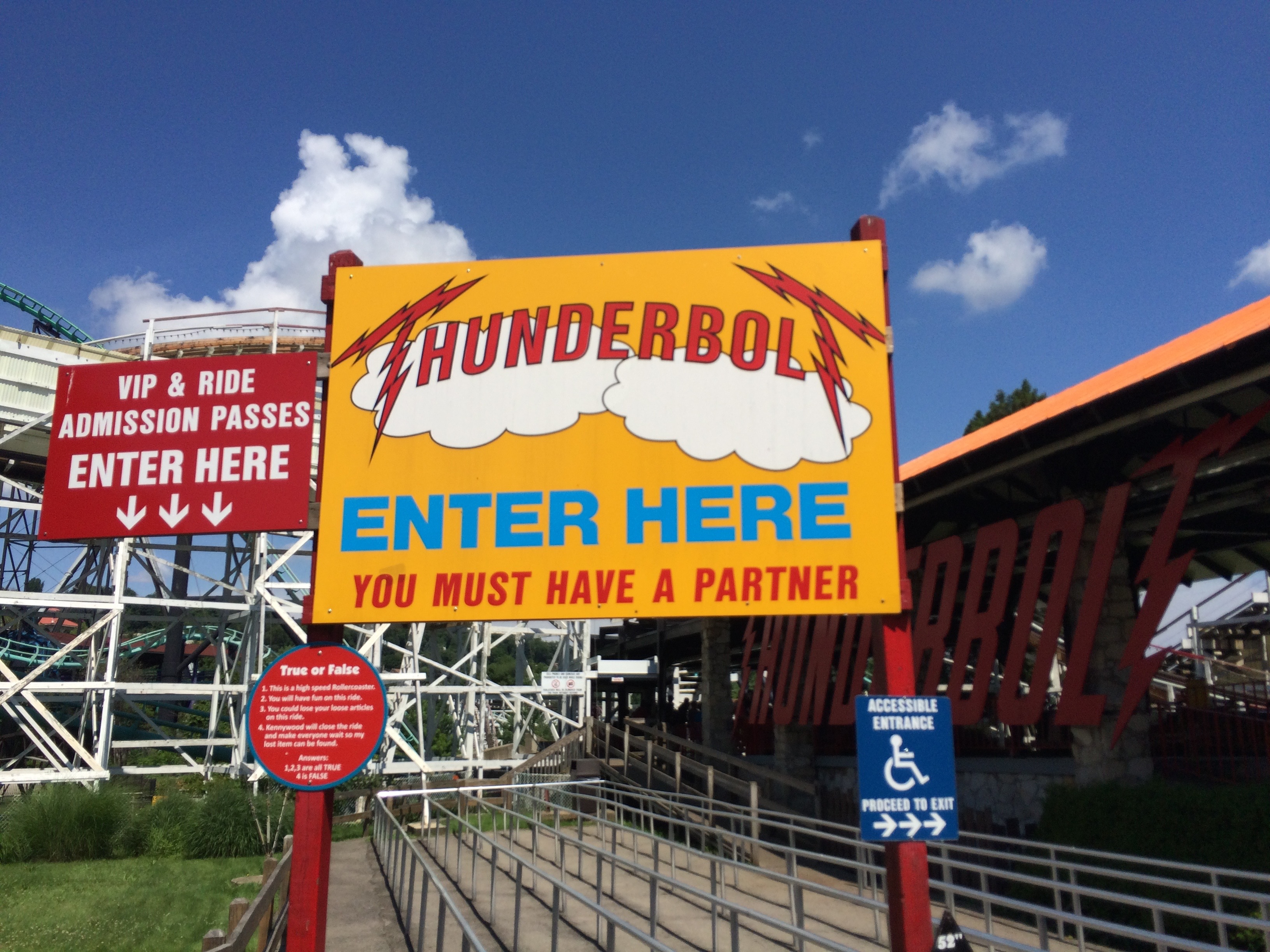
Thunderbolt entrance

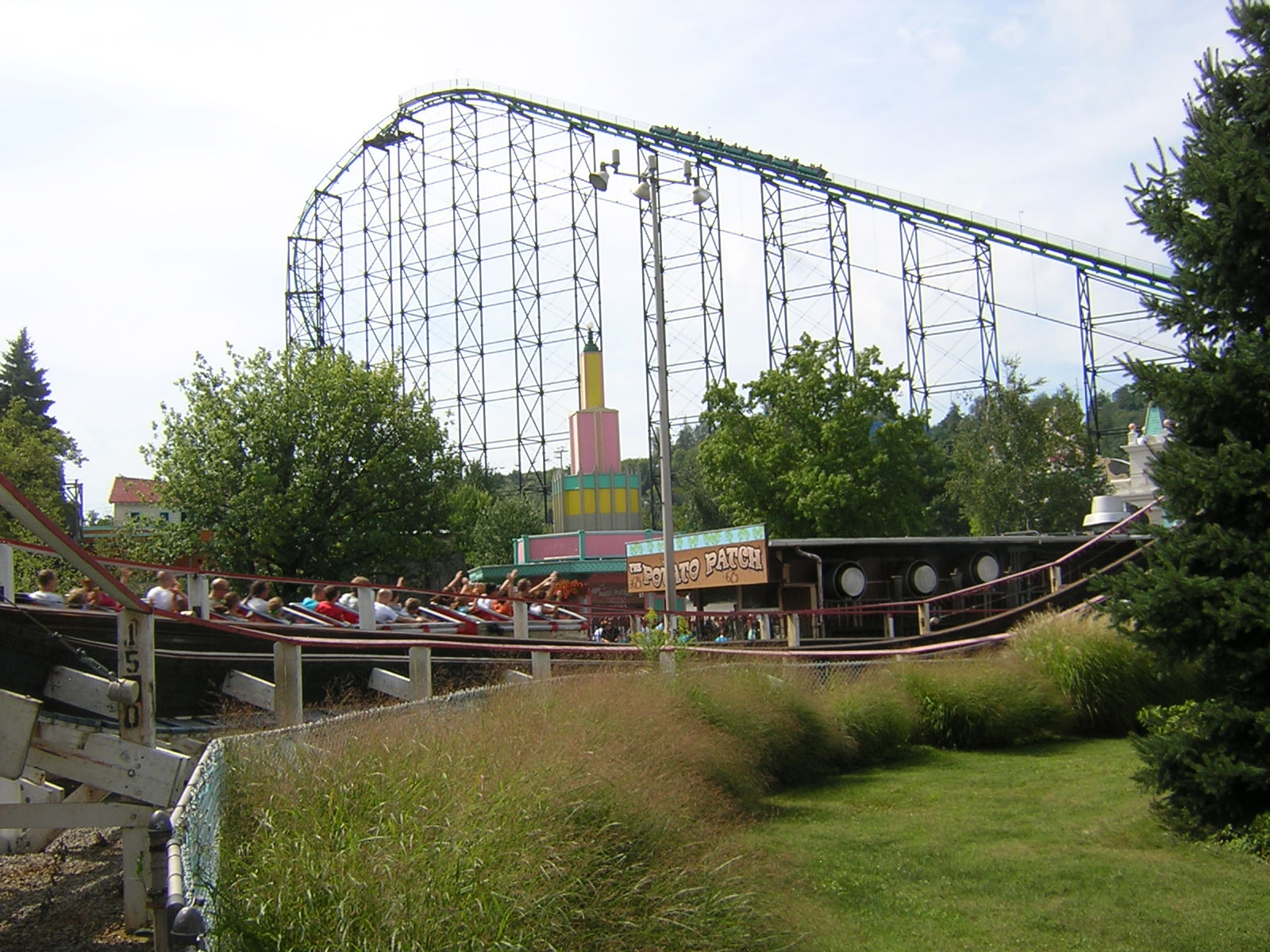
Thunderbolt helix with Phantom's Revenge in the background

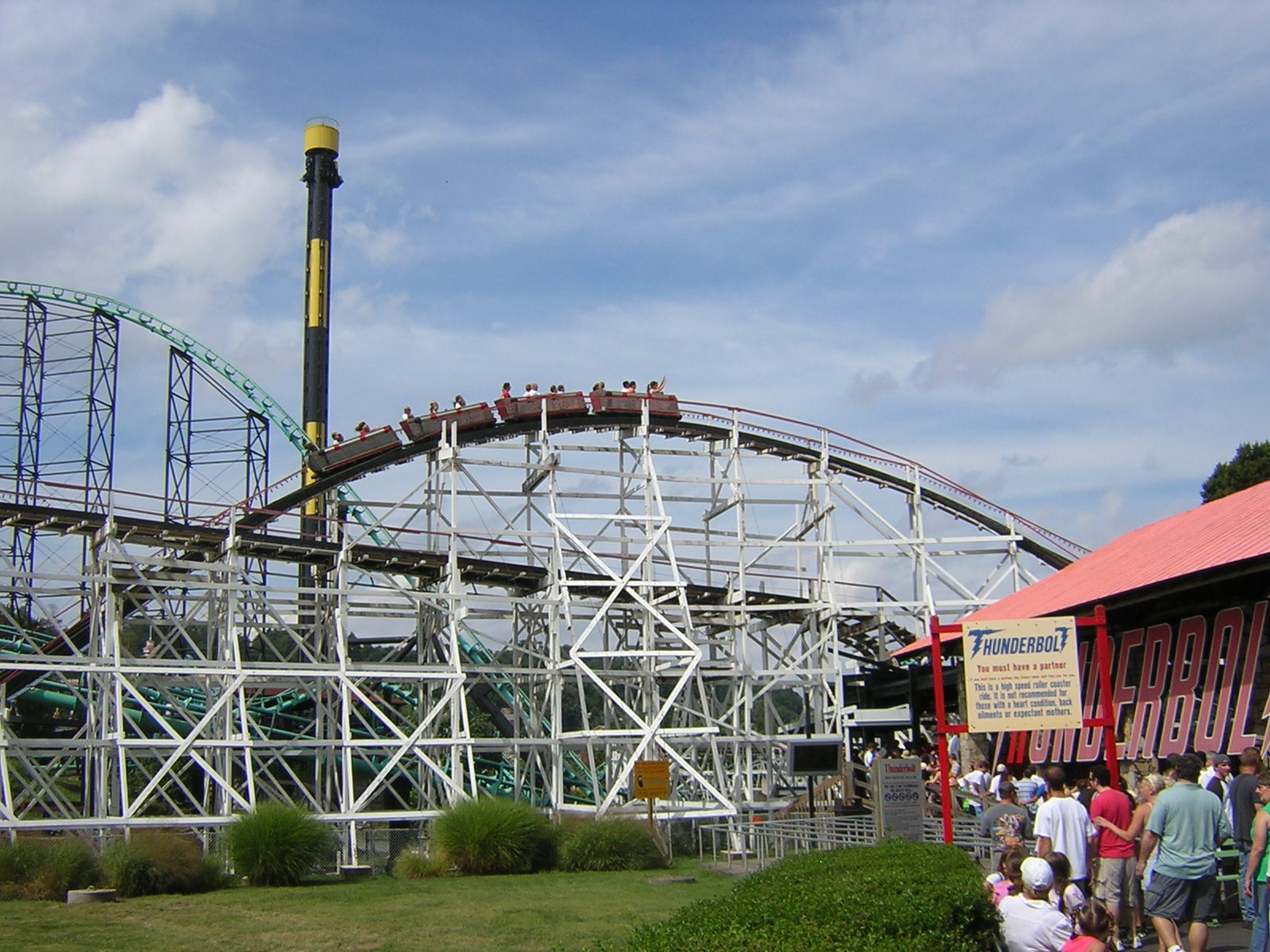
Thunderbolt cresting hill in front of Phantom's Revenge and Pitt Fall

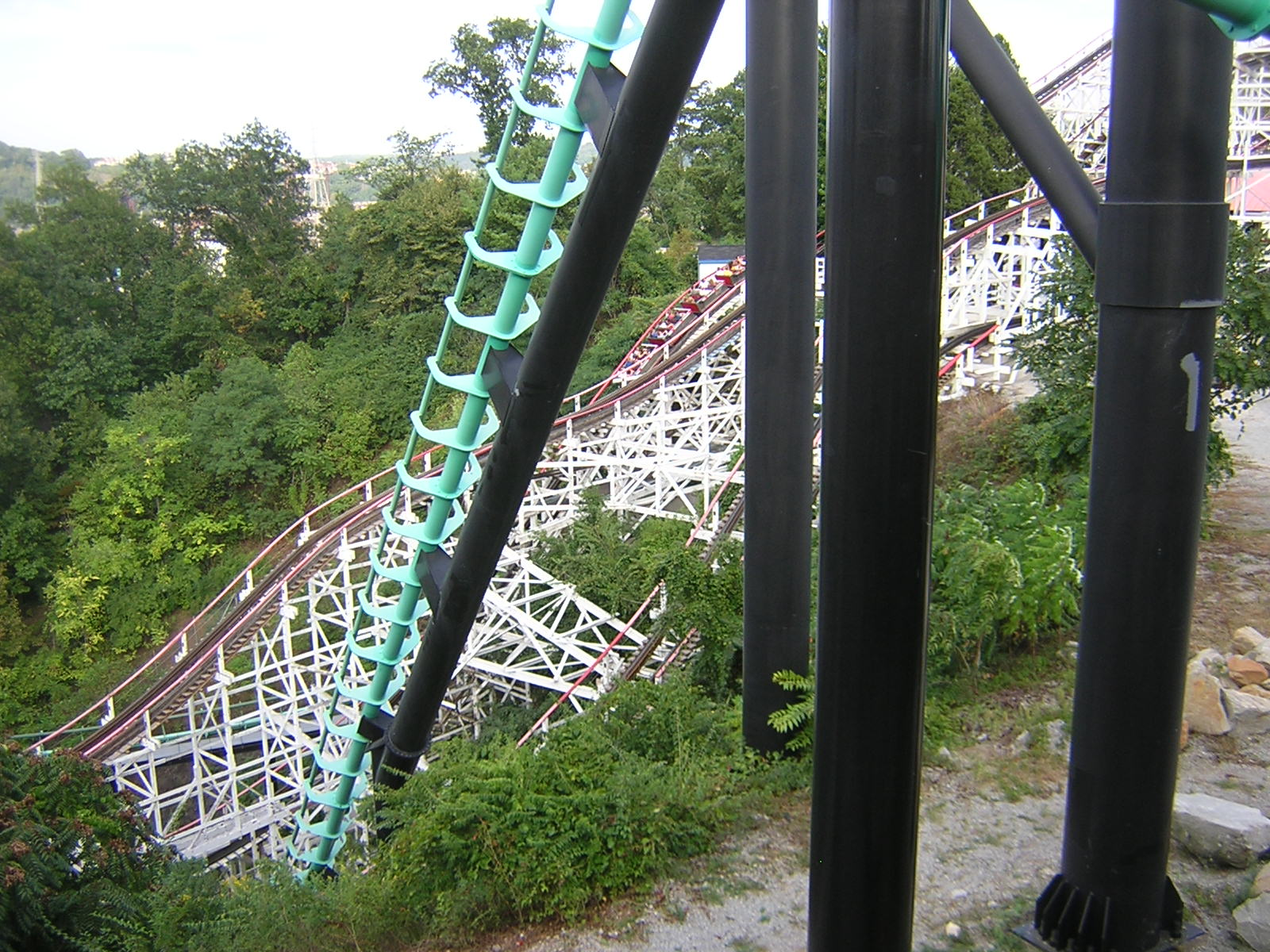
A view of the signature drop on Phantom's Revenge, which passes over two and under two Thunderbolt tracks

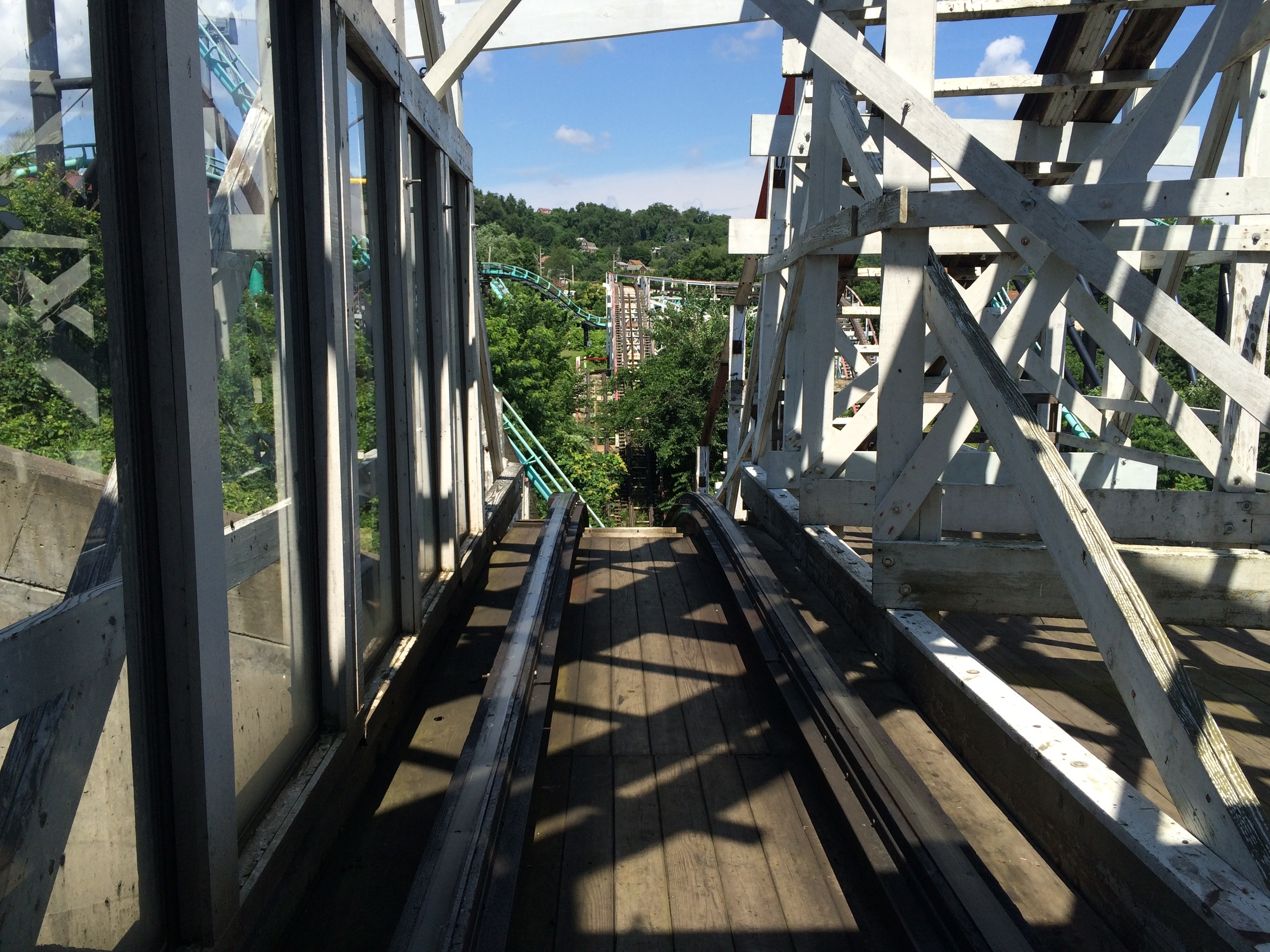
Beginning of Thunderbolt
