= Auto Race (ride) =

Ride at Kennywood

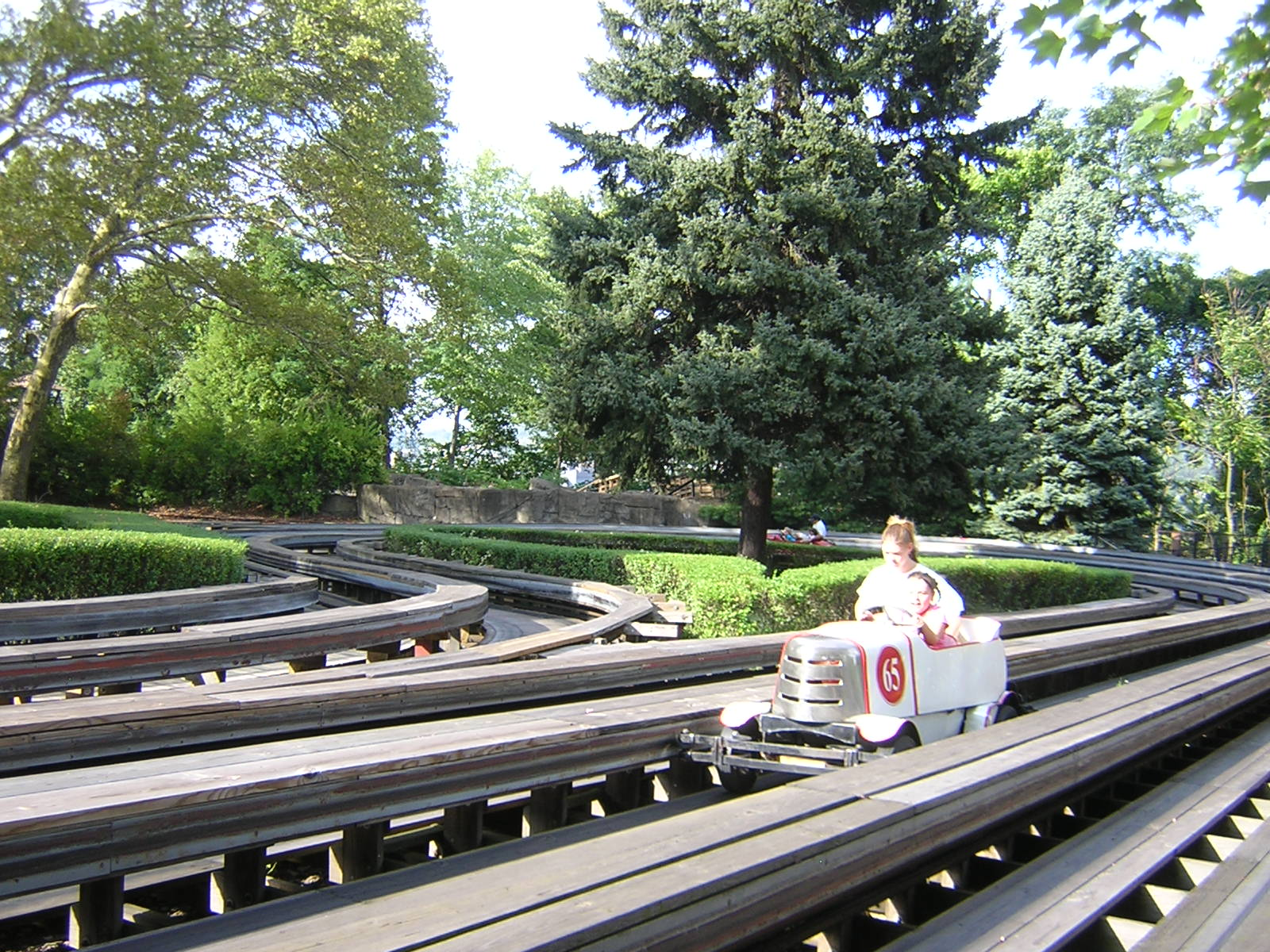
- Auto Race ride

Kennywood
- Coordinates: 40.3884°N 79.8637°W
- Status: Operating
- Opening date: 1930

Ride statistics
- Attraction type: car ride
- Manufacturer: Traver Engineering
- Designer: Harry G. Traver
- Height restriction: 46 in (117 cm)
- Park section: The Lagoon

Auto Race, previously known as Auto Ride, is a miniature car ride located at Kennywood amusement park in West Mifflin, Pennsylvania. It was conceived and designed by Harry G. Traver of Traver Engineereing. It features a set of electric cars traveling through a wooden trough-like track lined with metal strips used to carry the electrical current that powers the cars. It is the last remaining ride of its kind.

== History ==
Built in 1930, Kennywood's Auto Race is the last surviving ride of its kind. Built on the location of the park's former Racer roller coaster, it originally featured a series of small hills in the track and jalopy-style cars.

In 1948, the hills were removed after cars constantly collided with one another on days when the track was wet and they failed to climb the hills. The original cars were redesigned with a more streamlined body. Also in 1948, the ride's name was changed to Auto Ride. Its name was changed back to Auto Race in 1996. At some point in the 90s, the cars were painted with racing numbers and the facade of the station was given a new racing motif, painted by local artist Raphael Pantalone and his wife, Kathleen, complete with a replica of the animated neon sign that was added to the front in the 1950s.

== Gallery ==
Kennywood Auto Race
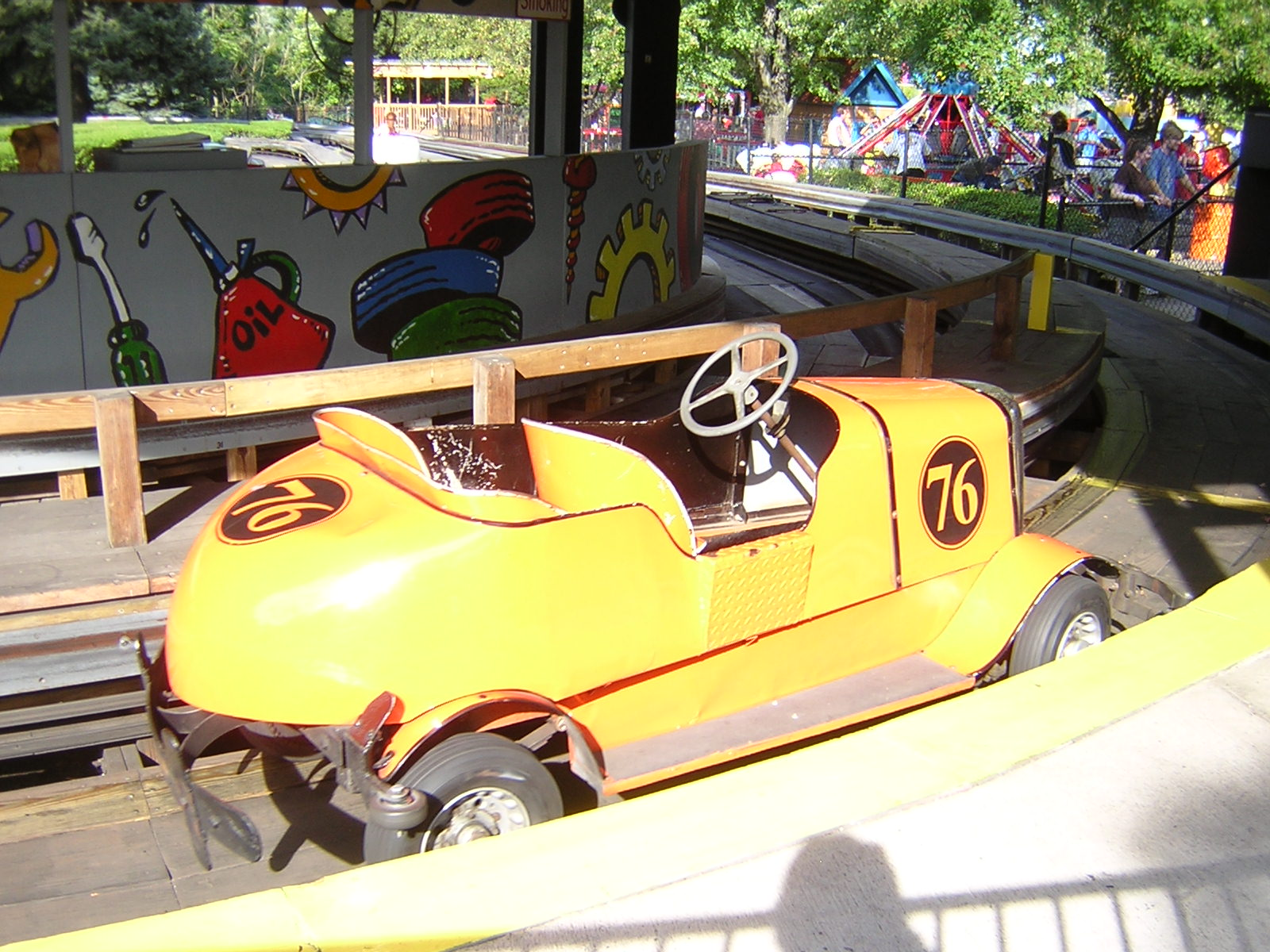
Yellow car in station.

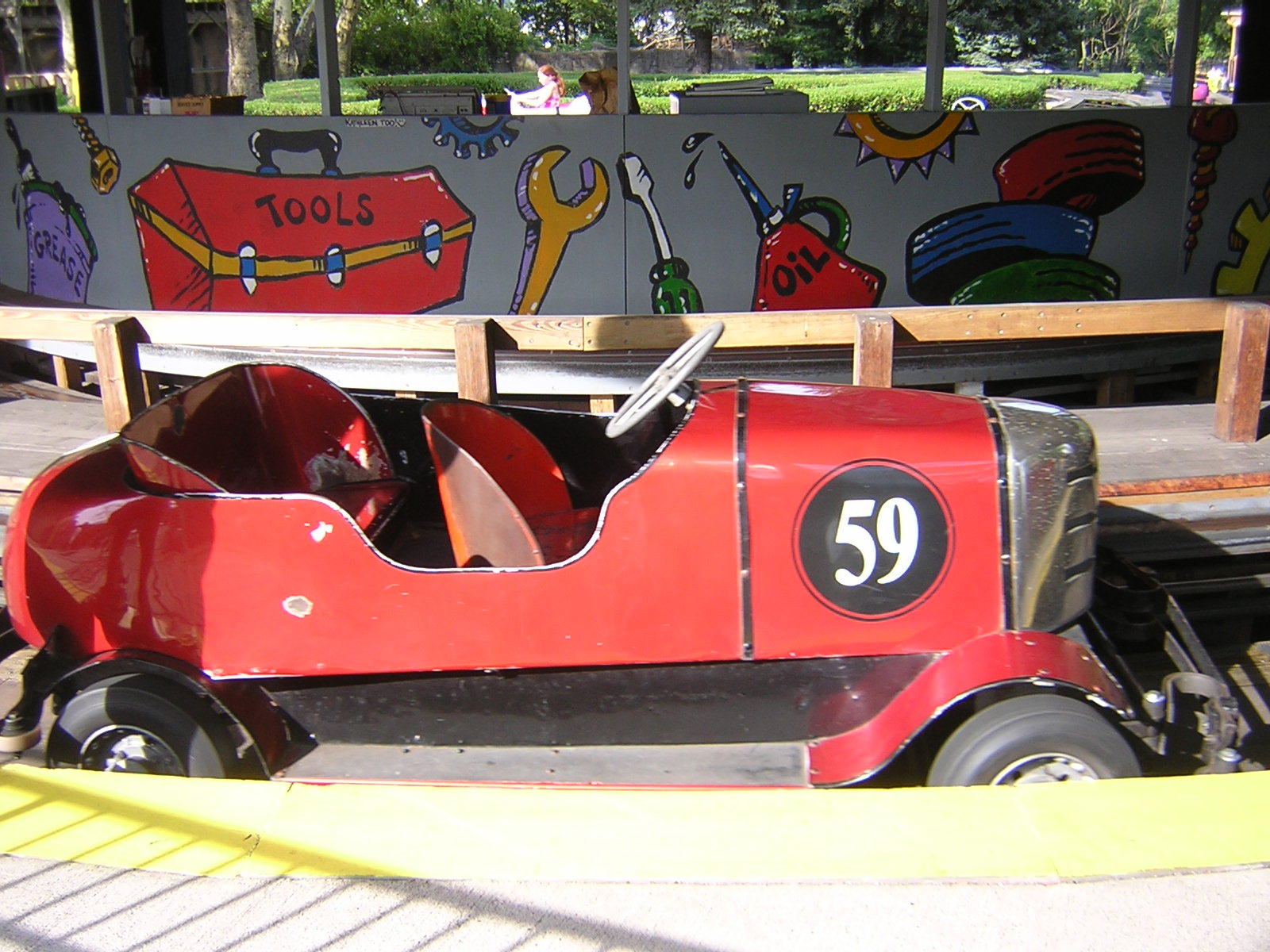
Red car in station.

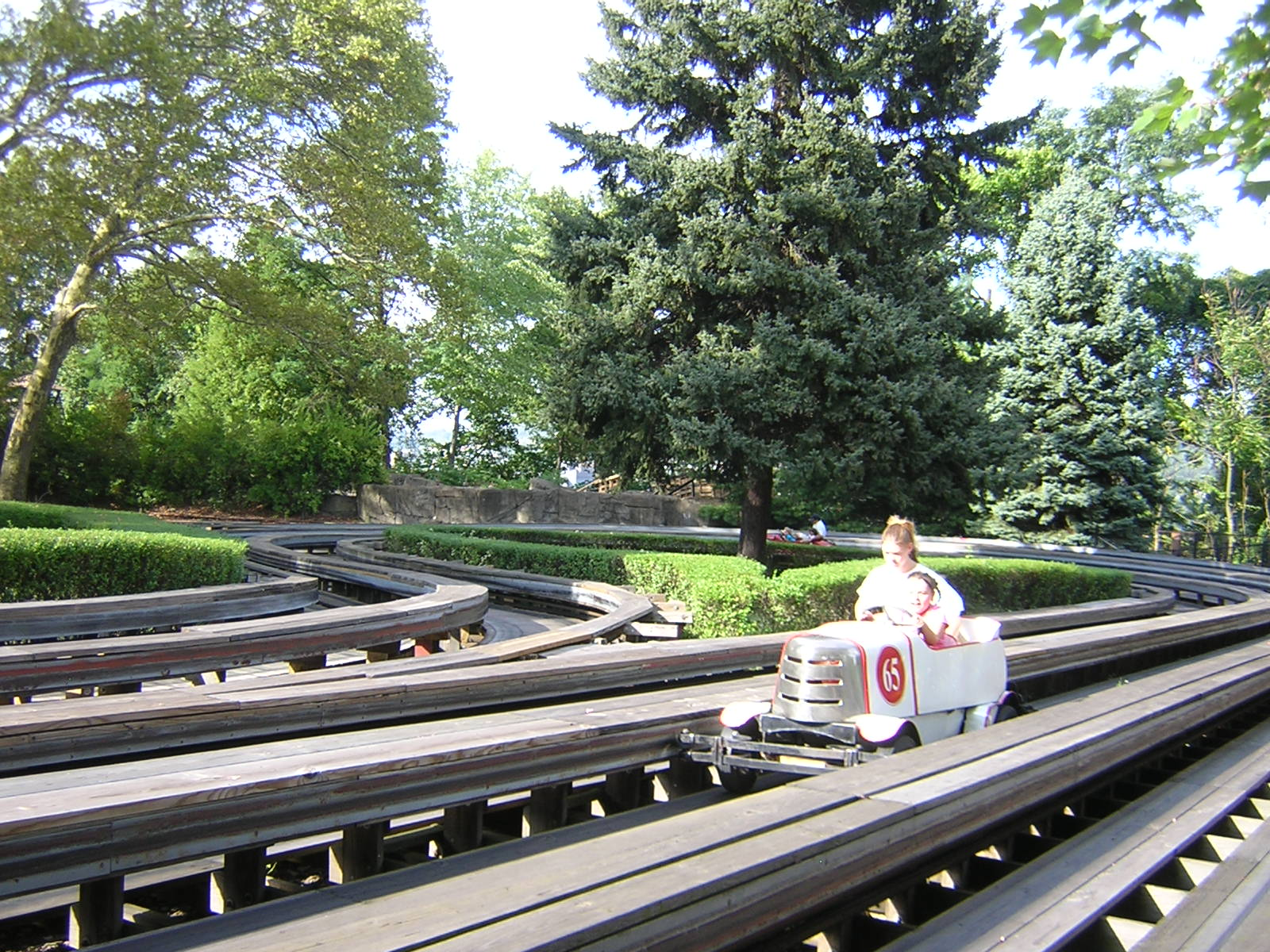
White car on track.

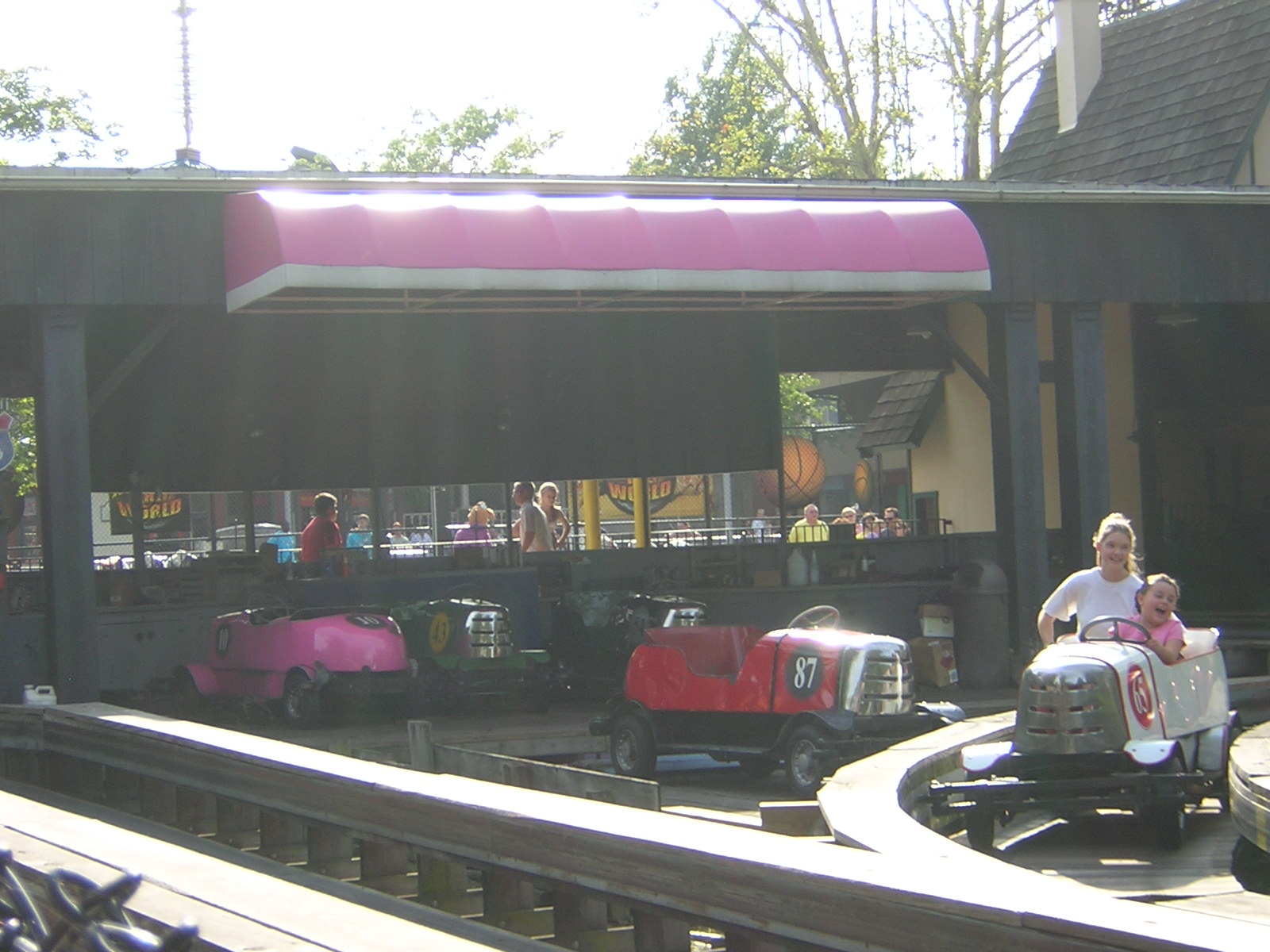
Cars in storage.
