= Detonator (disambiguation) =

A detonator is a small explosive device used to trigger a larger explosion.

Detonator or The Detonator(s) may also refer to:

== Books ==
- The Detonators, a novel in the Matt Helm series

== Films and TV ==
- The Detonator, a 2006 film starring Wesley Snipes
- Death Train, also known as Detonator, a 1993 made-for-TV movie starring Pierce Brosnan and Patrick Stewart
- The Detonators (TV series), a documentary series on the Discovery Channel
- Detonator, a 1997 film by New Concorde
- Detonator, a 2003 film starring Randall Batinkoff and Elizabeth Berkley

== Music ==
- Detonator, stage name of Brazilian singer and humorist Bruno Sutter
- Detonator (album), a 1990 music album by Ratt

== Other uses ==
- Blasting machine, an electric device used to detonate explosives from a distance
- Detonator (railway), a railway device used to make a loud warning sound to train drivers
- Detonator (game), a drinking game
- Detonator (Thorpe Park), a drop-tower ride at Thorpe Park in Chertsey, Surrey, England
- Detonator (Worlds of Fun), a drop-tower ride at Worlds of Fun in Kansas City, Missouri
- Detonator, a 1998 Nvidia named driver for RIVA TNT graphics chip

== See also ==
- Detonation (disambiguation)
- Detonator theory (disambiguation)
