= Detained =

Detained may refer to:

- Detention (imprisonment)
- Detained (1924 film), an American silent comedy starring Stan Laurel
- Detained (2024 film), an American psychological thriller
- "Detained" (Class), a 2016 TV episode
- "Detained" (Star Trek: Enterprise), a 2002 TV episode
- Detained (novel), a 2015 novel by Don Brown

== See also ==
- Detention (disambiguation)
