= Detonation (disambiguation) =

Detonation is a process of combustion in which a supersonic shock wave propagates through a body of material.

Detonation may also refer to:

- Engine knocking, a manifestation of improper combustion timing in internal combustion engines

== Entertainment ==
- Detonation, Season 2 Episode 9 The Man in the High Castle (TV series)
- Detonation (band), a Dutch melodic death metal band
- "Detonation", song by Trivium from The Crusade (album) 2006
- "Detonation", song by Steven Wilson from To the Bone (Steven Wilson album) 2017

== See also ==
- Detonator (disambiguation)
- Detention (disambiguation)
