= Spinning Dragons =

Spinning roller coaster at Worlds of Fun

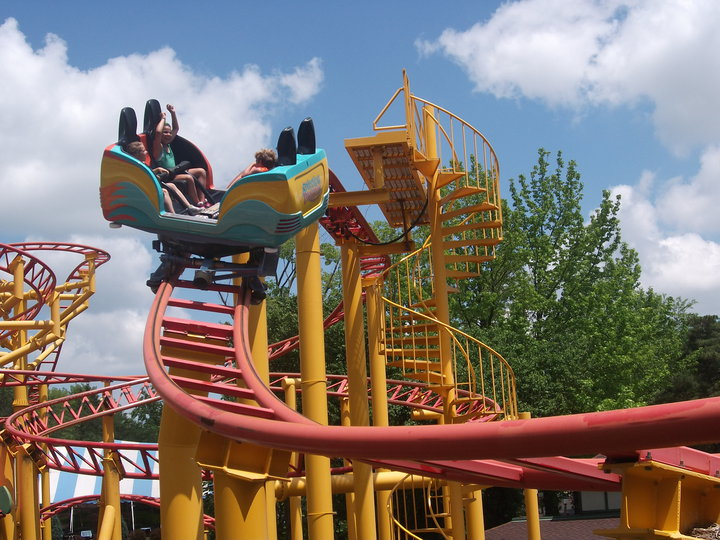
- Riders on Spinning Dragons

Worlds of Fun
- Location: Worlds of Fun
- Park section: East Asia
- Coordinates: 39.175405°N 94.487917°W
- Status: Operating
- Opening date: April 17, 2004
- Cost: $4,000,000 USD
- Replaced: Orient Express

General statistics
- Type: Steel – Spinning
- Manufacturer: Gerstlauer
- Lift/launch system: Chain Lift
- Height: 54 ft (16 m)
- Drop: 50 ft (15 m)
- Length: 1,345 ft (410 m)
- Speed: 31 mph (50 km/h)
- Inversions: 0
- Duration: 1 min 30sec
- Max vertical angle: 50°
- Capacity: 720 riders per hour
- Height restriction: 42 in (107 cm)
- Spinning Dragons at RCDB

Spinning Dragons is a spinning roller coaster located at Worlds of Fun in Kansas City, Missouri, United States. Manufactured by Gerstlauer, it was the second ride of its kind in the world after the Fairly Odd Coaster at Mall of America's Nickelodeon Universe. The ride was built in the East Asia area of the park in 2004 following the retirement of the Orient Express the previous year. The ride was installed by Ride Entertainment Group, who handles all of Gerstlauer's operations in the Western Hemisphere.

== History ==
On October 29, 2003, Worlds of Fun announced that Orient Express would be removed. That same day, the park announced that a new spinning roller coaster named Spinning Dragons would be added to the park.

The ride was set to open on April 3, 2004, but the opening was delayed. Spinning Dragons officially opened two weeks later on April 17, 2004.

== Seating arrangement and capacity ==
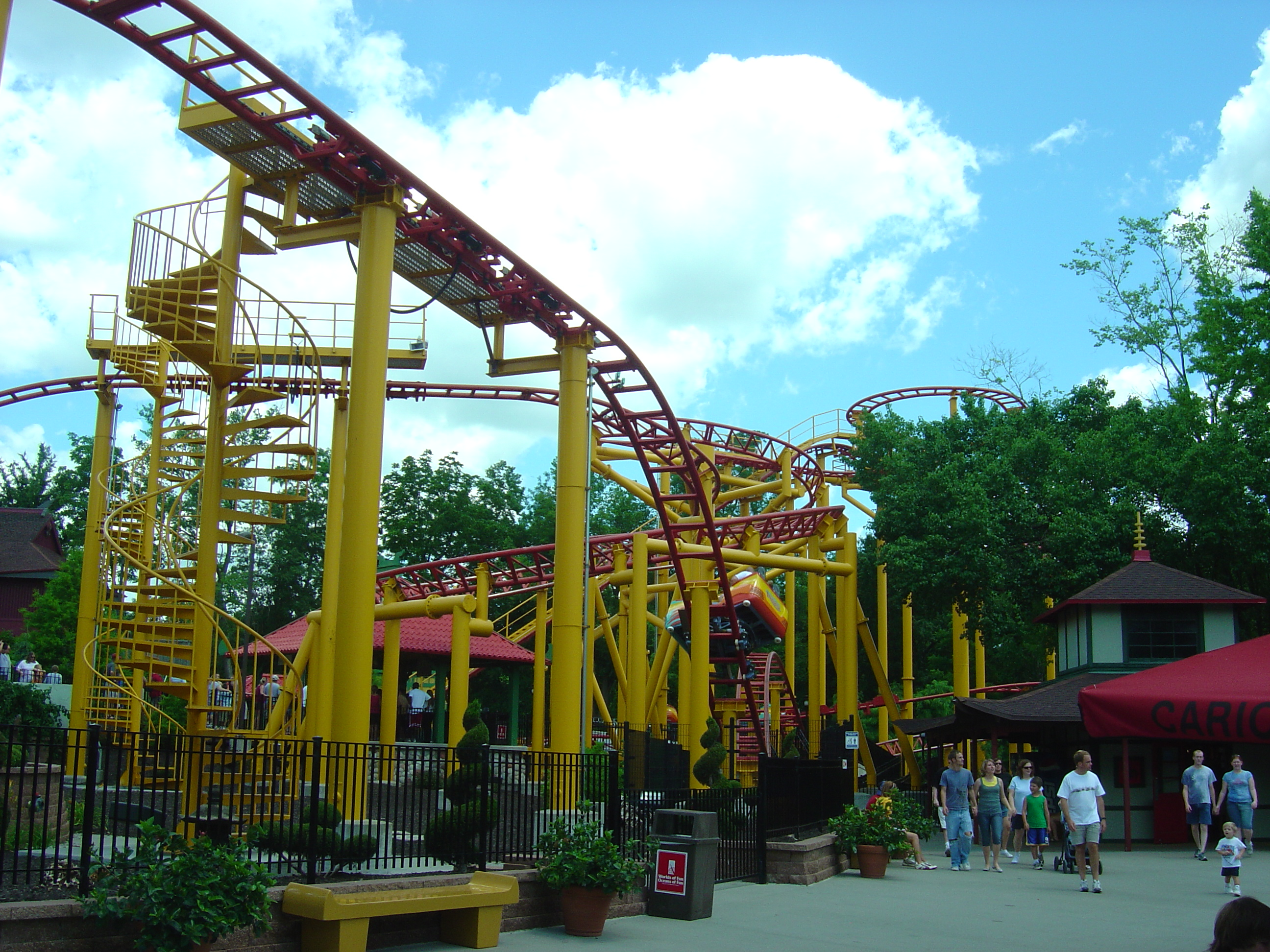

There are 6 cars. The riders are arranged 2 across in 2 rows, facing each other, for a total of 4 riders per car. Giving the ride a maximum capacity of 24 riders at a time. The ride has an estimated hourly operating capacity of 720 riders per hour.
