= Patriot (Worlds of Fun) =

Inverted roller coaster at Worlds of Fun

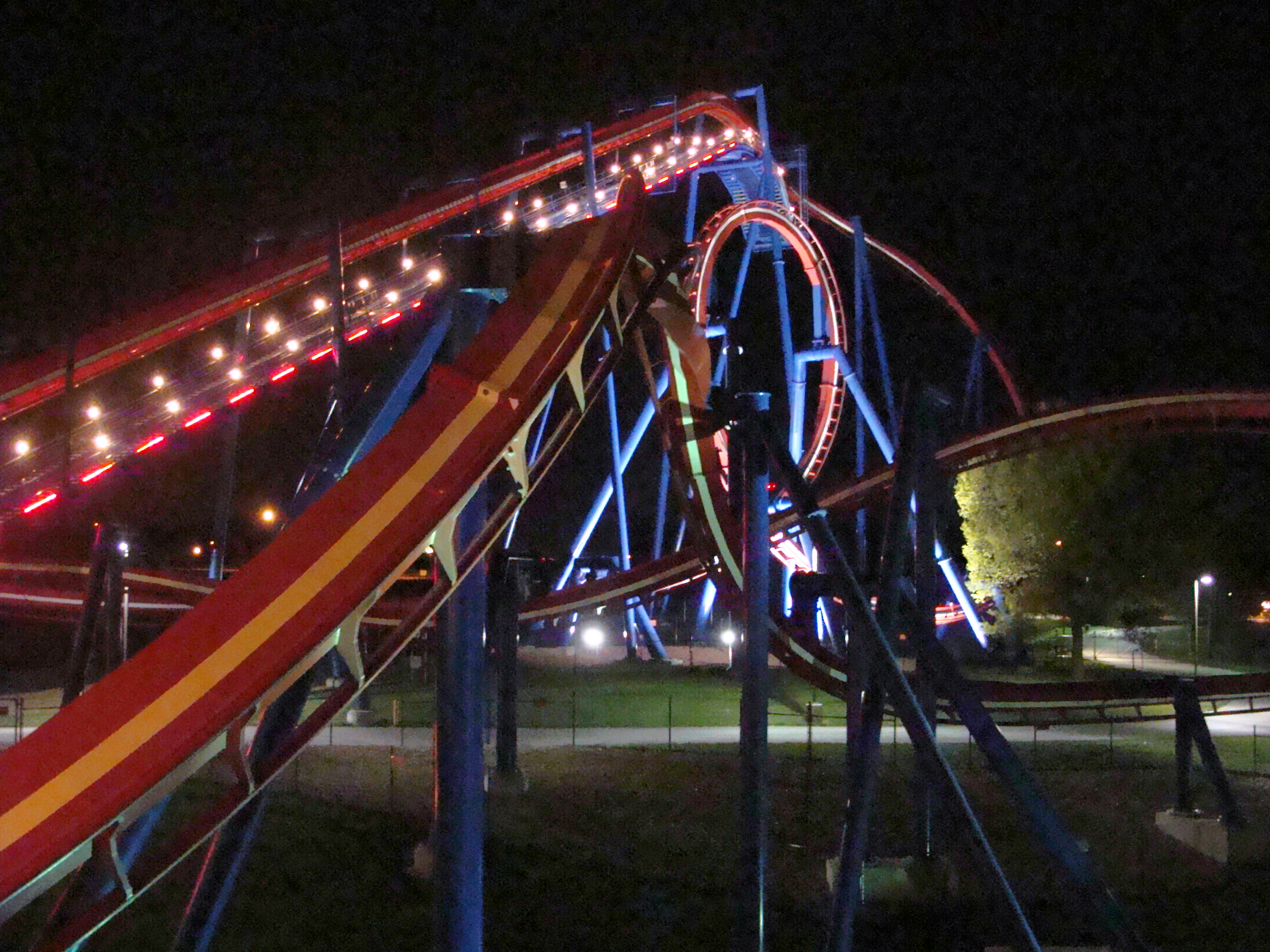
- Patriot at night

Worlds of Fun
- Location: Worlds of Fun
- Park section: Americana
- Coordinates: 39°10′31″N 94°29′20″W
- Status: Operating
- Opening date: April 8, 2006; 20 years ago
- Cost: US$14,000,000

General statistics
- Type: Steel – Inverted
- Manufacturer: Bolliger & Mabillard
- Model: Inverted Coaster
- Track layout: Twister
- Lift/launch system: Chain lift
- Height: 149 ft (45 m)
- Drop: 123 ft (37 m)
- Length: 3,081 ft (939 m)
- Speed: 60 mph (97 km/h)
- Inversions: 4
- Duration: 2:18
- Capacity: 1160 riders per hour
- Restraint style: Over-the-shoulder
- Height restriction: 54 in (137 cm)
- Trains: 2 trains with 7 cars; riders arranged 4 across in a single row for a total of 28 riders per train
- Fast Lane available
- Patriot at RCDB

Video

Patriot is an inverted roller coaster located at Worlds of Fun in Kansas City, Missouri. Manufactured by Bolliger & Mabillard, the inverted coaster opened to the public on April 8, 2006. It features four inversions, a height of 149 feet (45 m), and a track length of 3,081 feet (939 m).

== History ==
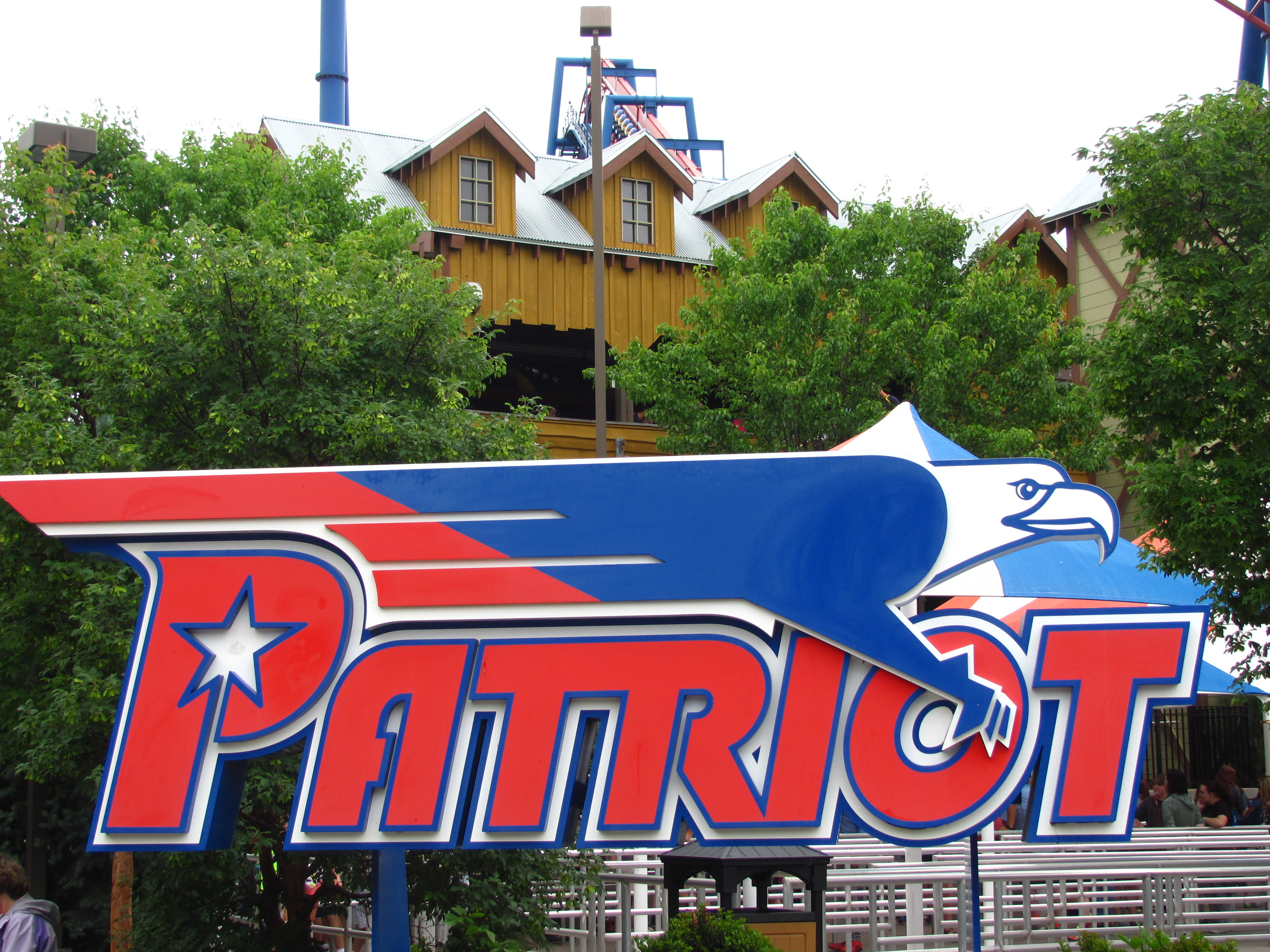
Sign at the entrance of Patriot

Patriot was announced on September 7, 2005, and was the park's largest investment at the time. Construction started in the transfer track and station area before progressing to the lift hill in early-October 2005. Just over two weeks later, the roller coaster's 149-foot (45 m) lift hill was topped off. After erecting the first drop and loop, construction on the zero-gravity-roll was complete by mid-November. The third inversion, an Immelmann loop, was completed about a week later, followed by the placement of the inclined loop pieces. After the corkscrew and other track elements were completed, the final piece of track was placed in the morning of January 13, 2006. After testing was completed, the attraction opened to the public on April 8, 2006.

In January 2019, Patriot was temporarily renamed The Patrick in honor of Patrick Mahomes, a Kansas City Chiefs quarterback.

The ride received a new coat of paint in early 2020.

== Ride experience ==
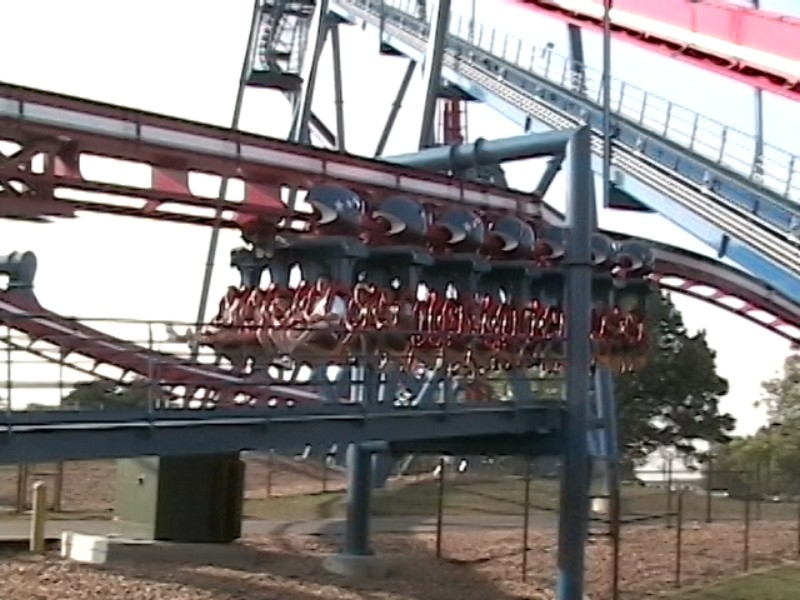
One of Patriot's trains entering the brake run.

After departing from the station, the train makes a left turn leading directly to the beginning of the 149-foot (45 m) lift hill. Once the train reaches the top of the lift hill, it makes a sharp, downward 129-foot (39 m) drop at a sharp right turn, in which the train reaches a top speed of 60 miles (97 km) per hour, followed by an 89-foot (27 m) Vertical loop. After exiting the loop and making a slight right turn, the train goes up, leading into a zero-gravity roll. The train drops back to the ground before going through an Immelmann loop. Next, the train enters a banked turn. Then the train goes over a small inverted hill, drops to the ground, and makes a left turn into a corkscrew. Then the train makes a right turn, which leads to the brake run. The train then makes a left turn back into the station where the next riders board.

One complete cycle of the roller coaster lasts about 2 minutes and 18 seconds.

== Characteristics ==
=== Trains ===
Patriot operates with two steel and fiberglass trains which were manufactured in Switzerland before being shipped to Kansas City. Each train has seven cars that can seat four riders in a single row for a total of 28 riders per train. The train structure is colored blue, yellow, and white and the seats and over-the-shoulder restraints are both red.

=== Track ===
The steel track of Patriot is approximately 3,081 feet (939 m) long. The height of the lift hill is approximately 149 feet (45 m) high, and (with the supports) weighs approximately 1,850,000 pounds (840,000 kg). It was fabricated by Clermont Steel Fabricators in Batavia, Ohio, who manufactures Bolliger & Mabillard's roller coasters and was erected by Lico Steel. The track color is red with a continuous white strip running through the middle and the supports are blue.

== Reception ==
Mike from NewsPlusNotes likes the fact that Patriot and Talon at Dorney Park & Wildwater Kingdom are very similar in terms of their layouts. He also praises the ride for its speed and enjoyability, "[The train] heads through those elements at a good clip and keeps the fun factor up throughout the ride."
