= Detention center =

A detention center, or detention centre, is any location used for detention. Specifically, it can mean:

- A remand prison
- A structure for immigration detention
- An internment camp
- A youth detention center, a secure prison or jail for persons under the age of majority

== Biology ==
- Detention center (cell biology), a nucleolar detention center in cell biology
