= Detention =

Detention may refer to:

== Types of detention ==
- Detention (confinement), the restriction of liberty of someone suspected or accused of a crime
- Detention basin, an artificial flow control structure that is used to contain flood water for a limited period of time
- Immigration detention, imprisonment of an unauthorised person entering a country
- Preventive detention, detention intended to prevent criminal acts
- Remand (detention), the keeping in custody of an arrested person awaiting adjudication
- School detention, a form of punishment used in schools

== Film and television ==
- Detention (2003 film), an American action film directed by Sidney J. Furie
- Detention (2010 film), an American horror film starring Preston Jones and David Carradine
- Detention (2011 film), an American horror film directed by Joseph Kahn and starring Josh Hutcherson
- Detention (2019 film), a Taiwanese horror film set during the White Terror, based on the video game of the same name
- Detention (American TV series), a 1999–2000 American animated TV series
- Detention (Taiwanese TV series), a 2020 Taiwanese TV series based on the video game
- "Detention" (Cold Case episode), a 2006 television episode
- "Detention" (Dawson's Creek), a 1998 television episode

== Other uses ==
- Detention (video game), a Taiwanese horror game set during the White Terror
- "Detention", a song by Melanie Martinez from her 2019 album K-12
- Detention, Tasmania, a locality in Australia

== See also ==
- Custody (disambiguation)
- Detention center (disambiguation)
- Detonation (disambiguation)
- Involuntary commitment
- Prison
