= Prowler (roller coaster) =

Wooden roller coaster at Worlds of Fun

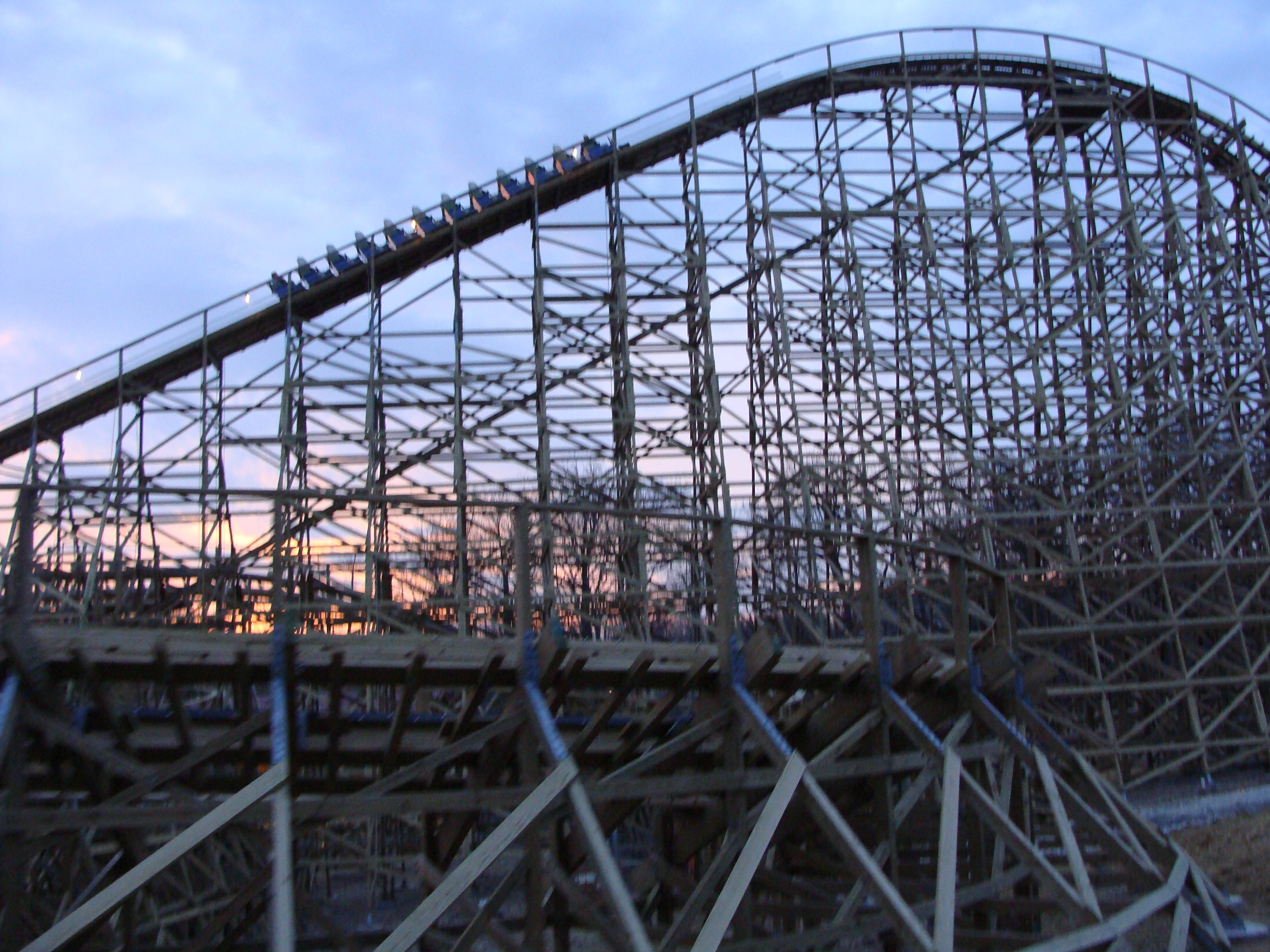
- Prowler with car ascending

Worlds of Fun
- Location: Worlds of Fun
- Park section: Africa
- Coordinates: 39.174400°N 94.483691°W
- Status: Operating
- Opening date: May 2, 2009
- Cost: $8 million

General statistics
- Type: Wood
- Manufacturer: Great Coasters International
- Model: Custom
- Track layout: Twister
- Lift/launch system: Chain lift hill
- Height: 102.3 ft (31.2 m)
- Drop: 85.9 ft (26.2 m)
- Length: 3,074 ft (937 m)
- Speed: 51.2 mph (82.4 km/h)
- Inversions: 0
- Duration: 2:30
- Capacity: 850 riders per hour
- Height restriction: 48 in (122 cm)
- Trains: 2 trains with 12 cars; riders arranged 2 across in a single row for a total of 24 riders per train
- Fast Lane available
- Prowler at RCDB

Prowler is a wooden roller coaster located at Worlds of Fun in Kansas City, Missouri. Manufactured by Great Coasters International, the $8 million ride opened to the public on May 2, 2009.

The ride is located in the Africa section of the park behind Zulu.

== History ==
Before the announcement of the new ride, there were teasers put out by the park. These teasers included placing a mysterious large storage crate at the front of the park, which was "delivered" by the "International Wildlife Organization (IWO)". More details of the package kept coming out through the blog and videos came out as the IWO storyline continued until September 1, 2008. That day, Worlds of Fun announced that Prowler would be coming to the park.

Prowler opened to the general public on May 2, 2009.

For the 2019 season, both Prowler and Timber Wolf were retracked. Some sections had their wood replaced, including the first drop. The wood on the outside section of the hill was being replaced with IPE wood, which was the highest quality timber available and eight times harder than California Redwood. This would add some softness to the turn and reduce the stress on the track. Plus, the ride received a new chain for the lift hill.

== Ride experience ==
Prowler is the second wooden roller coaster to be built at Worlds of Fun after Timber Wolf. The ride reaches a height of 85 feet (26 m), into a spiral drop which traverses a ravine and a patch of woods at top speeds of 51 miles (82 km) per hour.

== Trains ==
Two Millennium Flyer trains with 12 cars per train. Riders are arranged two across in a single row for a total of 24 riders per train.

== Awards ==
Prowler was voted Best New Ride of 2009 in Amusement Today's Golden Ticket Awards.

Golden Ticket Awards: Top wood Roller Coasters
Year									1998	1999
Ranking									–	–
Year	2000	2001	2002	2003	2004	2005	2006	2007	2008	2009
Ranking	–	–	–	–	–	–	–	–	–	8
Year	2010	2011	2012	2013	2014	2015	2016	2017	2018	2019
Ranking	12	10	13	12	12	17	14	27	30 (tie)	29
Year	2020	2021	2022	2023	2024	2025	2026			
Ranking	N/A	31	30	24	23	22	26			

== Gallery ==
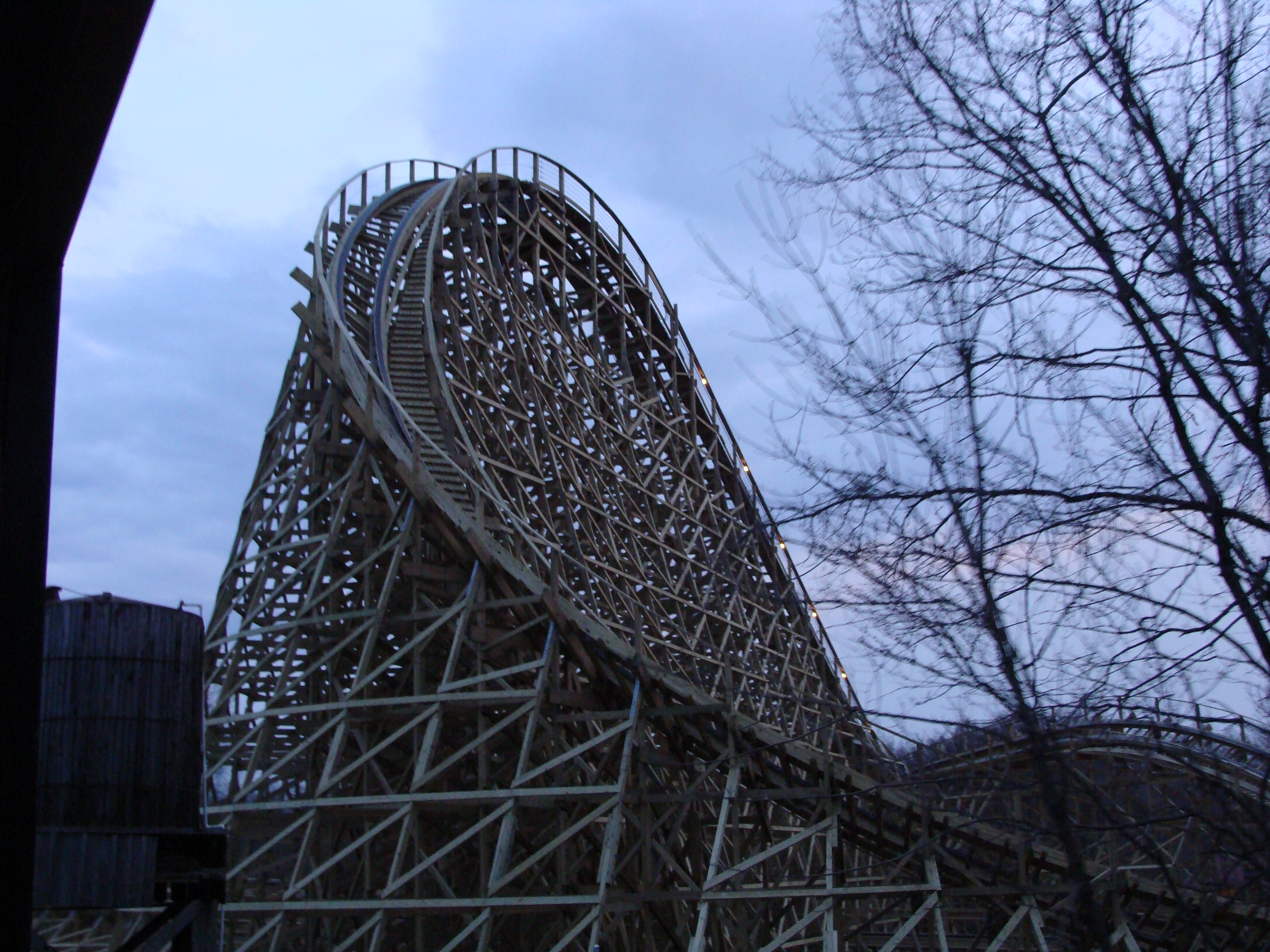
Prowler's first drop

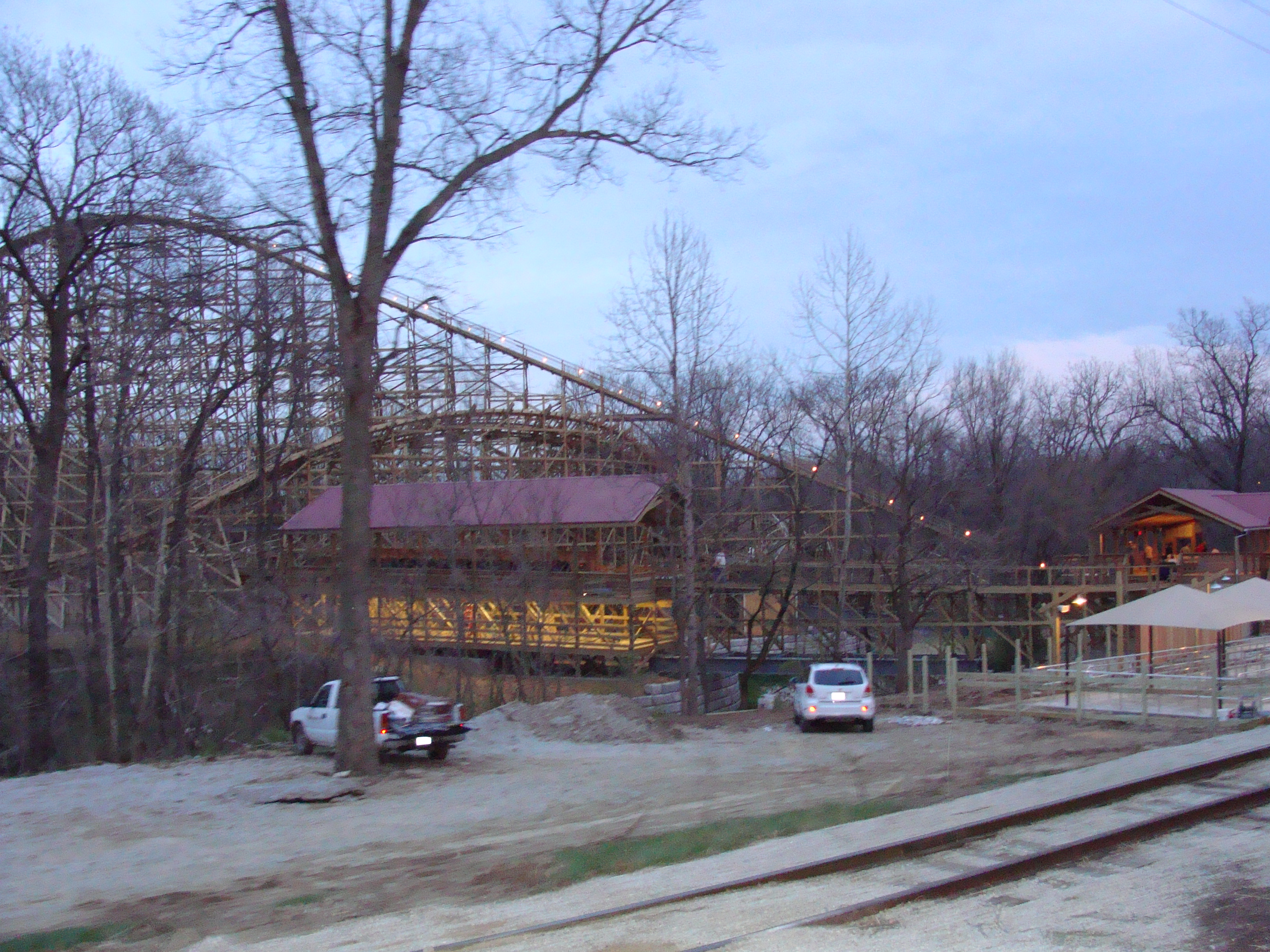
Prowler's line queue

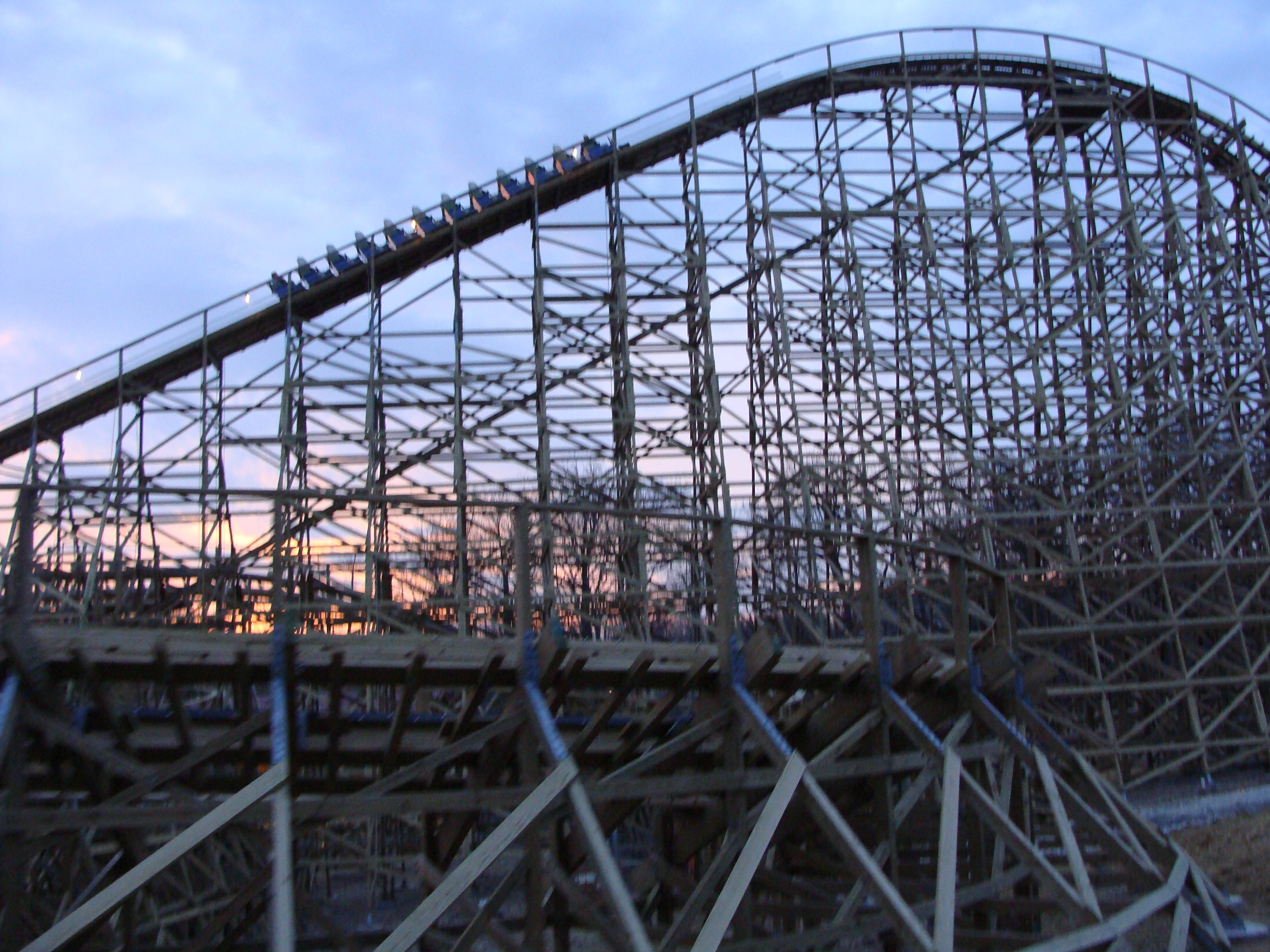
Prowler with car ascending

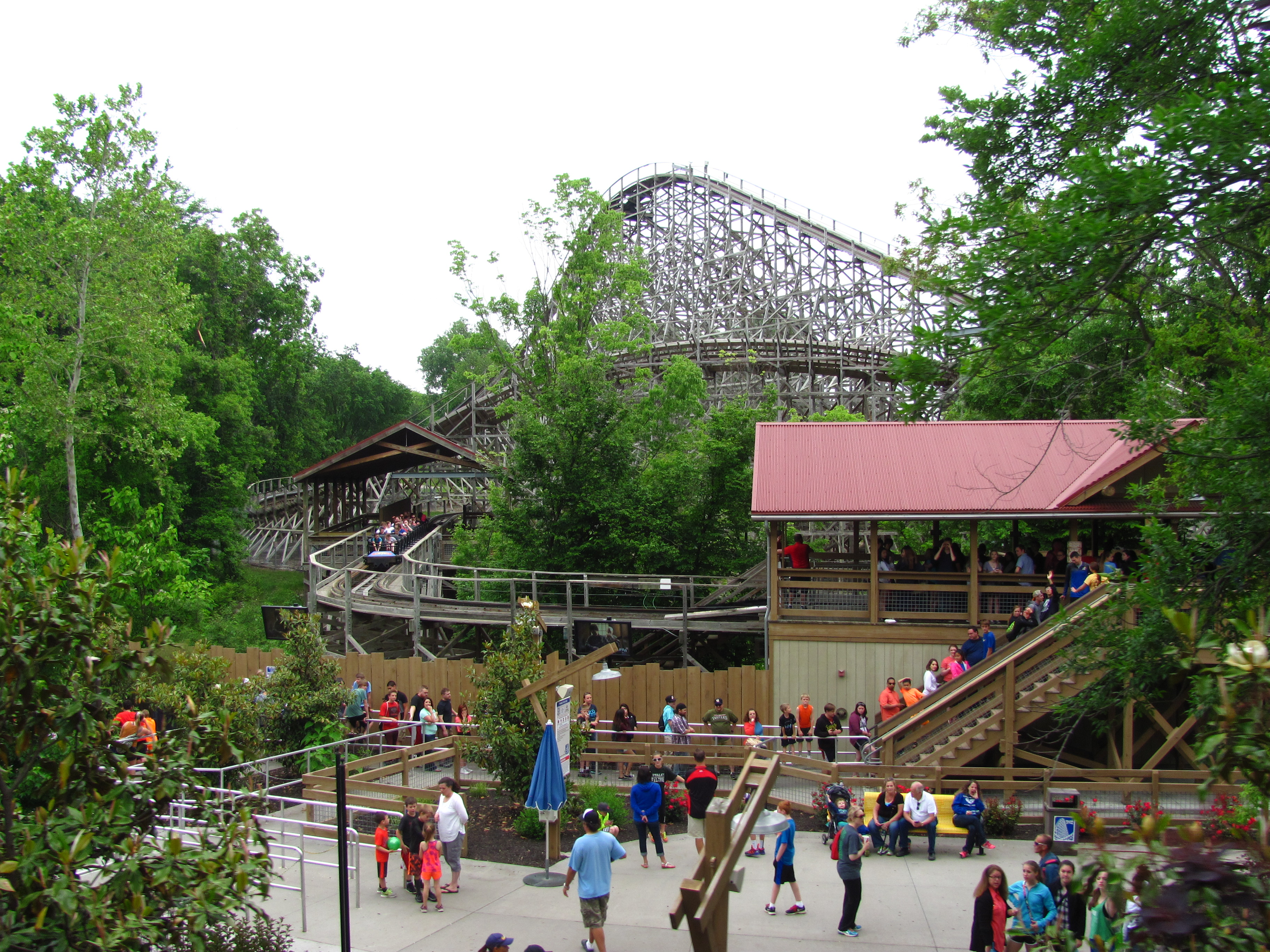
Prowler's ride station and queue

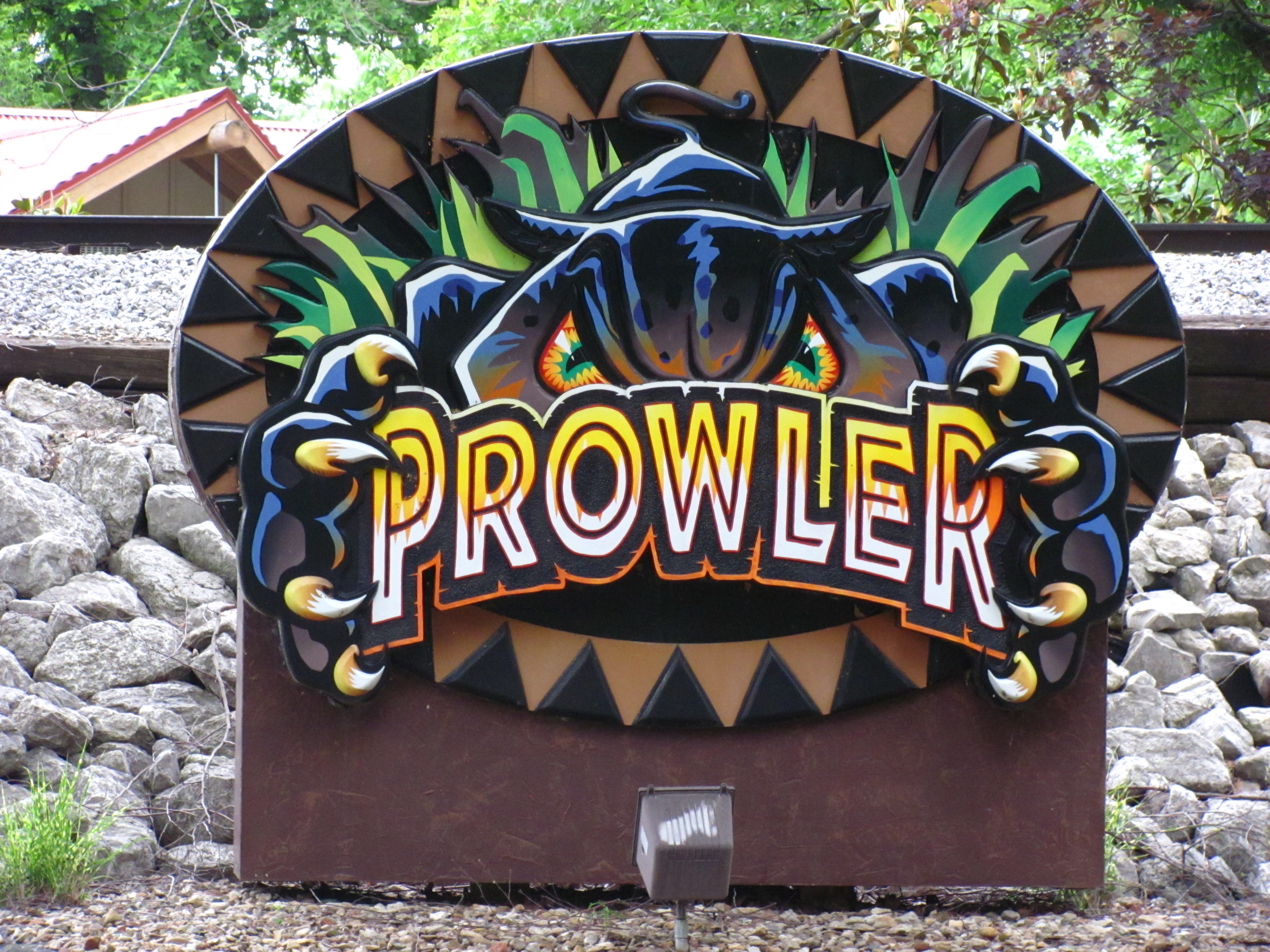
Prowler's ride sign
