= Worlds of Fun =

Theme park in Kansas City, Missouri

- Joint logo with Oceans of Fun used since 2026

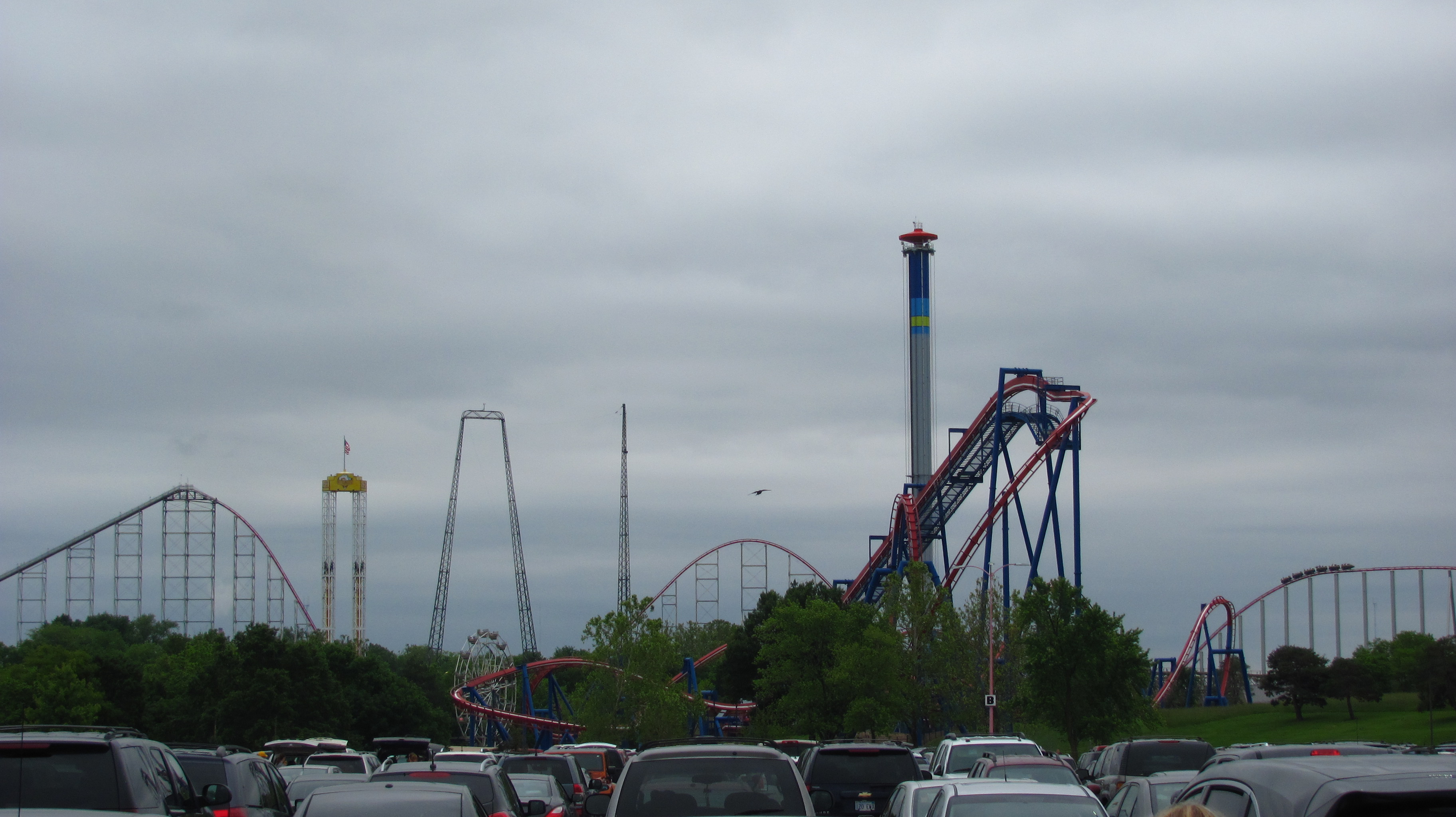
- Worlds of Fun from the parking lot (pictured in 2015)
- Interactive map of Worlds of Fun
- Location: Kansas City, Missouri, U.S.
- Coordinates: 39°10′38.4″N 94°29′20.5″W
- Status: Operating
- Owner: EPR Properties
- Operated by: Enchanted Parks
- General manager: Dameon Nelson
- Theme: Around the World in Eighty Days by Jules Verne
- Slogan: The Best Place in Kansas City to Have Fun
- Operating season: April/May through November
- Area: More than 235 acres (0.95 km^{2}) (~0.90 km^{2})

Attractions
- Total: 43
- Roller coasters: 7
- Water rides: 11
- Website: worldsoffun.enchantedparks.com
- Opened: May 26, 1973

Worlds of Fun (stylized as Worlds & Oceans of Fun by Enchanted Parks) is a 235-acre (95 ha) theme park located in Kansas City, Missouri, United States. Operated by Enchanted Parks, the park features 43 attractions. EPR Properties, a real estate investment trust, owns the park.

Worlds of Fun was founded by American businessmen Lamar Hunt and Jack Steadman under the ownership of Hunt's company, Mid-America Enterprises in 1973. Oceans of Fun is a water park that opened in 1982 and is next to the amusement park. Admission to Oceans of Fun is included with the price of admission to Worlds of Fun. Mid-America Enterprises sold both parks to Cedar Fair in 1995 for $40 million. Cedar Fair merged into a newly-formed company named Six Flags in 2024, which sold the park to EPR Properties in 2026.

== History ==
Texas and Arkansas native Lamar Hunt brought the Dallas Texans AFL team, which he owned, to Kansas City, Missouri, in 1963, renaming the franchise the Kansas City Chiefs. He founded an operating company in the region called Mid-America Enterprises, which focused on real estate, mining, and entertainment. Worlds of Fun was conceptualized and developed by Hunt, his business partner Jack Steadman, and theme park designer Randall Duell.

Construction began in November 1971 at the northern edge of SubTropolis, a vast subterranean industrial complex developed by Hunt within a limestone mine in the bluffs above the Missouri River in Clay County, Missouri. The project was completed over 17 months at an estimated cost of $20 million, and the park officially opened on May 26, 1973. At the time it opened, numerous projects across Kansas City were being built, including Kansas City International Airport, Kemper Arena (now called Hy-Vee Arena), and the Truman Sports Complex. The park was originally planned to complement a 500-acre (2.0 km^{2}) hotel and entertainment complex, but a lagging economy during the park's early years derailed the idea.

In 1974, the first addition to Worlds of Fun was the 4,000-seat Forum Amphitheater, which opened in the Europa section of the park. In 1976, a new section opened in honor of the United States Bicentennial – the 200th anniversary of the signing of the Declaration of Independence–and was named Bicentennial Square. The new section included the debut of Screamroller from Arrow Dynamics, which was a replica of the first modern looping roller coaster, Corkscrew, that opened a year earlier at Knott's Berry Farm.

In 1982, Oceans of Fun opened next door as the largest water park in the world. In the same year, a sub-world named "River City" was opened in Americana, adjacent to the East Asia section (then referred to as the Orient section). Screamroller was transformed into Extremeroller the following year, which featured stand-up trains instead of the original sit-down models, making it the first looping, stand-up roller coaster in North America. Several years later, in 1989, Worlds of Fun ended the decade with the addition of Timber Wolf, a wooden roller coaster that initially ranked high in several national polls.

Cedar Fair LP purchased Worlds of Fun in 1995 for $40 million. The new owners invested $10 million with the addition of Mamba, a D.H. Morgan Manufacturing steel hypercoaster, to the park's attraction lineup in 1998.

During the COVID-19 pandemic, the park operated under a limited schedule from 2020 to 2022. Worlds of Fun operated from June 22 to September 7 in 2020, while Oceans of Fun did not open that season. In 2021, the park opening was delayed until May 22, and until April 30 in 2022.

On July 1, 2024, a merger of equals between Cedar Fair and Six Flags was completed, creating Six Flags Entertainment Corporation. On March 5, 2026, Six Flags announced it would sell Worlds of Fun to EPR Properties. The sale completed on April 6, 2026, making Enchanted Parks its operator. A new logo was then introduced at the park's Fall Family Fest on November 7, 2026.

=== Other notable additions ===
- 2006: Patriot opens as the longest, tallest, and fastest full-circuit inverted roller coaster in the region. It was the park's largest capital investment on a single attraction at $14 million.
- 2008: For their 35th anniversary, Worlds of Fun added a festival called Oktoberfest.
- 2009: A new wooden coaster, Prowler, is added to the Africa section of the park. It receives the Golden Ticket Award for "Best New Ride of 2009" by Amusement Today magazine.
- 2010: Snoopy's Hot Summer Lights, a $1 million immersive light and sound experience, opens in the Europa and Africa sections of the park. Subway opens at Oceans of Fun.
- 2011: Planet Snoopy, an $8-million children's themed area, is added to Worlds of Fun, featuring over 20 rides and attractions. An Illions carousel called The Grand Carrousel was added to the Scandinavia section of the park.
- 2012: A premium line queue system called "Fast Lane" is introduced.
- 2013: Oceans of Fun receives full integration with Worlds of Fun, allowing visitors to access both parks with a single admission ticket.
- 2014: WindSeeker – a 301-foot (92 m) Mondial swing ride at Knott's Berry Farm – was renamed SteelHawk and relocated to Worlds of Fun for the 2014 season.
- 2016: Planet Snoopy receives upgrades, including five new rides added to the children's area, with the removal of two former attractions.
- 2017: Mustang Runner (HUSS Troika) and Falcon's Flight (HUSS Condor) are added to the Americana section of the park. A newly remodeled entrance is introduced, and Winterfest is introduced in November.
- 2018: Nordic Chaser (Mack SeaStorm) is added to the Scandinavia section of the park. Timber Wolf replaced their helix with a new seventy-degree banked turn. Great Coasters International constructed the new element.
- 2019: Worlds of Fun added a new flagship restaurant, Cotton Blossom BBQ. It is 9,000 square feet and seats more than 300 guests.
- 2020: Riptide Raceway, the world's longest mat racing slide, was to have opened to the public, but deferred to 2021 on grounds of COVID-19 pandemic.
- 2023: Zambezi Zinger, located in the African section of the park, is added as the world's first ground-up GCI Titan Track wooden coaster. It is named after a former coaster that once operated there. The coaster's opening coincided with the park's 50th anniversary.

=== 2026 IATSE unionization ===
On July 7, 2026, employees at the Worlds of Fun amusement park in Kansas City, Missouri voted 21–1 to unionize with International Alliance of Theatrical Stage Employees (IATSE) Local 31, forming a bargaining unit of 37 workers across technical services, wardrobe, costumes, and creative services. The organizing campaign, which began in early 2025, faced obstacles including a dispute over the bargaining unit's composition, a change in park ownership, and the firing of a lead organizer the day before the vote, which was later addressed as an unfair labor practice.

== Areas and attractions ==
The park takes its theme from the Jules Verne novel Around the World in Eighty Days. Worlds of Fun is divided into eight major sections (Gateway Gardens, East Asia, Americana, Wild West, Europa, Africa, Scandinavia, and Planet Snoopy). Rides, attractions, shops, shows, and restaurants are named according to the area theme. In 1997, the Americana "main entrance" was closed for the creation of Grand Prix Raceway, so the "back gate" has been the "main gate" ever since.

The park is laid out in a Duell loop; guests first enter Gateway Gardens, previously known as International Plaza, and can travel clockwise to Scandinavia, Africa, Wild West, Americana, and East Asia. Europa transverses the circle between Africa and Wild West. Africa is divided into three sub-sections: Serengeti, Morocco, and Egypt. Past sub-sections have also included Bicentennial Square, River City, and Beat Street, which have all been absorbed back into Americana. The Wild West section was also previously part of Americana before being split into its own area.

Behind the Wild West section lies Planet Snoopy, the area of the park specifically for young children. Originally added in 1978 as an expansion of Americana, over the years the area has changed its identity several times. Initially, it was called "Aerodrome" (1978–86) and featured futuristic rides for adults. It was converted into a children's area called "Pandamonium!" in 1987, in reference to park mascots named Sam and P.J. Panda, and was re-themed to "Berenstain Bear Country" in 1997, "Camp Snoopy" in 2001, and finally "Planet Snoopy" in 2011.

Although there is no Australian/Oceanic section in the park, there is an Australian-themed Boomerang roller coaster in the Africa section.

=== Roller coasters ===
Ride name	Picture	Year opened	Manufacturer	Current location	Description
Boomerang		2000	Vekoma	Africa	It opened in the vacancy left by the original Zambezi Zinger's departure in 1997 and used Zambezi's line queue. Since 2005, the line queue and signage has moved.
Mamba		1998	Morgan	Africa	The tallest, fastest, and longest coaster in the park. It is classified as a hypercoaster, which is any coaster that exceeds 200 feet (61 m) in height or drop length.
Patriot		2006	Bolliger & Mabillard	Americana	An inverted roller coaster that features four inversions, a height of 149 feet (45 m), and a track length of 3,081 feet (939 m). At the time, it was the park's largest ever capital expenditure, and was the tallest and fastest ride of its type in the region.
Prowler		2009	Great Coasters International	Africa	A twister wooden coaster. Prowler was voted Best New Ride of 2009 - Amusement Park in Amusement Today's Golden Ticket Awards.
Spinning Dragons		2004	Gerstlauer	East Asia	A spinning roller coaster, it was the second ride of its kind in the world after Fairly Odd Coaster at Mall of America (which Cedar Fair still had partial ownership of at the time). The ride was built in the East Asia area of the park in 2004 following the retirement of the Orient Express.
Timber Wolf		1989	Dinn Corporation	Wild West	A classic twister wooden coaster. Timber Wolf was voted the world's top roller coaster in the 1991 Inside Track readers survey, and was rated the number one favorite wooden coaster in the 1992 NAPHA survey.
Zambezi Zinger		2023	Great Coasters International and Skyline Attractions	Africa	Named after a former coaster that operated at Worlds of Fun under the same name, it was the first ground-up GCI Titan Track hybrid coaster.

=== Africa ===
Ride	Year opened	Sub-section	Ride Manufacturer	Type	Height Requirement	Rating
Boomerang	2000	Morocco	Vekoma	Boomerang roller coaster	Over 48"	5
Fury of the Nile	1984	Egypt	Intamin	River rafting ride	Over 46"	4
Mamba	1998	Egypt	Morgan	Steel hypercoaster	Over 48"	5
Prowler	2009	Serengeti	Great Coasters International	Wooden coaster	Over 48"	4
Zambezi Zinger	2023	Morocco	Great Coasters International (manufacturer) and Skyline Attractions (designer)	Hybrid roller coaster	Over 48"	5
Zulu	1979	Serengeti	HUSS	Enterprise	Over 54"	4

=== Americana ===
Ride	Year opened	Ride Manufacturer	Type	Height Requirement	Rating
Patriot	2006	Bolliger & Mabillard	Inverted roller coaster	Over 54"	5
RipCord+	1996	Sky Fun 1	Skycoaster	Over 42"	5
Skyliner	1991	Eli Bridge	Ferris wheel	Over 48" or 36" with adult	2
SteelHawk	2014	Mondial	Windseeker	Over 52"	4

=== Europa ===
Ride	Year opened	Ride Manufacturer	Type	Height Requirement	Rating
Autobahn	1973	Reverchon	Bumper Cars ride	Over 48"	4
Flying Dutchman	1973	Intamin	Flying Dutchman	Over 46" or with adult	2
Le Taxi Tour	1973	Arrow Dynamics	Track car ride	Over 48" or with adult	2

=== Gateway Gardens ===
Ride	Year opened	Ride Manufacturer	Type	Height Requirement	Rating
The Grand Carrousel	2011	1926 M.C. Illions	Carousel	Over 42" or with adult	2

=== East Asia ===
Ride	Year opened	Ride Manufacturer	Type	Height Requirement	Rating
Bamboozler	1977	Hrubetz	Round Up	Over 46"	3
Spinning Dragons	2004	Gerstlauer	Spinning roller coaster	Over 48" or 42" with adult	5

=== Planet Snoopy ===
Ride	Year opened	Ride Manufacturer	Type	Height Requirement	Rating
Beagle Brigade Airfield	2016	Zamperla	Flying Tigers	Over 36" or with adult	2
Camp Bus	2001	Zamperla	Crazy Bus	Over 36" or with adult	2
Charlie Brown's Windup	1987	Zamperla	Lolly Swing	Between 36" and 54"	1
Flying Ace Balloon Race	2011	Zamperla	Balloon Race	Over 42" or with adult	2
Kite Eating Tree	2001	S&S Worldwide	Kite Flyer	Over 36"	2
Linus' Launcher	2016	Zamperla	Kite Flyer	Over 42" or 36" with adult	3
Lucy's Tugboat	2011	Zamperla	Tugboat	Over 42" or with adult	2
Peanuts 500	2011	Zamperla	Speedway	Over 36" or with adult	2
Peanuts Road Rally	2011	Zamperla		Over 36" or with adult	1
Sally's Swing Set	2011	Zamperla	Happy Swing	Between 36" and 73"	2
Snoopy Junction	2016	Zamperla		Over 36" or with adult	1
Snoopy vs. Red Baron	1974	Herschell		Between 36" and 54"	2
Snoopy's Rocket Express	2011	Zamperla		Over 42" or with adult	2
Snoopy's Space Buggies	2016	Zamperla		Over 36" or with adult	2
Woodstock Gliders	2016	Larson	Flying Scooter	Over 44" or 36" with adult	3
Woodstock Whirlybirds	2011	Zamperla		Over 36" or with adult	2

=== Scandinavia ===
Ride	Year opened	Ride Manufacturer	Type	Height Requirement	Rating
Fjörd Fjärlane	1981	Meisho Rides	Swing Around	Over 46" or with adult	3
Nordic Chaser	2018	Mack	Seastorm	Over 48" or 40" with adult	3
Scandi Scrambler	2015 (originally 1973)	Eli Bridge	Scrambler	Over 48" or 36" with adult	3
Sea Dragon	1994	Chance Morgan	Pirate ship	Over 48" or with adult	3
Viking Voyager	1973	Arrow Dynamics	Log flume	Over 46" or 36" with adult	4

=== Wild West ===
Ride	Year opened	Ride Manufacturer	Type	Height Requirement	Rating
Cyclone Sam's	1995	Chance Rides	Wipeout	Over 48"	5
Detonator	1996	S&S Worldwide	Space shot	Over 48"	5
Mustang Runner	2017	HUSS	Troika	Over 54" or 42" with adult	3
Timber Wolf	1989	Dinn Corporation	Wooden roller coaster	Over 48"	5
Worlds of Fun Railroad	1973	Crown Metal Products	3 ft (914 mm) narrow gauge railroad	Over 42" or with adult	2

- + Denotes an extra cost for the ride or attraction.

== Former rides and attractions ==
=== Roller coasters ===
- Schussboomer, (1973–1984), a Schwarzkopf ski-themed steel roller coaster with ten separate 4-passenger cars.
- Silly Serpent/Funicular, (1973–1987) An Allan Herschell Company Little Dipper. The children's coaster was originally located in the Europa section of the park as "Funicular" and moved to the Africa section where it operated as "Silly Serpent" until it was removed in 1987.
- Screamroller/Extremeroller (EXT), (1976–1988), an Arrow Dynamics coaster which was the first stand-up roller coaster in the Western Hemisphere. Its only season as a stand-up coaster was in 1983, after which it was reverted to the original sit-down style. This coincided with the ride's name change, which remained until the ride's closure.
- Zambezi Zinger, (1973–1997), a steel Schwarzkopf Speedracer model roller coaster with an electric spiral lift and a fast-paced ride through the woods. Moved to Parque del Café in Colombia, reopening as Montaña Rusa in 1999 until its closure in 2025.
- Orient Express, (1980–2003), manufactured by Arrow Dynamics, it was the first roller coaster in the world to feature a batwing (then known as a "Kamikaze Curve"), now a common element in thrill rides.
- Cosmic Coaster (1993-2026). A junior wacky worm style roller coaster that is loosely Snoopy-themed. It operated under the name Wacky Worm until 2012.

=== Flat rides/attractions ===
- The Safari, (1973–1978) a safari themed Gould Manufacturing jeep ride similar to Le TaxiTour, replaced by Zulu.
- Barnstormer, (1978–1983), a 100-foot tall spinning airplane ride manufactured by Bradley & Kaye. Added with the opening of the Aerodrome area. Retired in part due to frequent shutdowns due to high winds.
- Ski Heis/Sky Hi, (1973–1987) a Von Roll Skyride
- Wobble Wheel, (1977–1993) a Chance Rides Trabant. The Wobble Wheel, an outdoor ride, was replaced by the indoor Cyclone Sam's in 1995, which is an upgraded version of the Trabant called Wipeout.
- Incred-O-Dome, (1981–1997), an OMNIMAX-style theater where viewers could go on a virtual ride of, among other things, the Orient Express coaster. This appealed to visitors who did not want to wait in line or experience the real ride, as well as those with physical conditions which would prevent them from riding at all. The show was presented less than 200 yards (180 m) away from the actual ride.
- Python Plunge/The Plunge, (1988–1999) a water-slide type ride where the riders would carry the raft up to the top themselves. There were two types of slides: one slide was open aired and went straight down; the other was a twisting tube. The ride originally opened as Python Plunge, but its name was changed to The Plunge in 1992.
- Omegatron, (1986–2001), a six-story Vekoma Sky Flyer ride, replaced by Thunderhawk.
- Rockin' Reeler, (1991–2005), a Reverchon Industries Superbob/Music Express, removed during the construction of Patriot Landing.
- Grand Prix Raceway, (1997–2014), go-kart racing, replaced by SteelHawk.
- Octopus, (1973–2014) an Eyerly Monster octopus, replaced by the Scandi Scrambler.
- Thunderhawk, (2002–2015) a HUSS Top Spin ride that flipped riders several times and took riders to a height of 60 feet.
- Krazy Kars, (1973–2015) a children's bumper car ride removed for Mustang Runner.
- Le Carousel, (1979–2016) a 3-abreast carousel replaced by Falcon's Flight.
- Finnish Fling, (1973–2017) a Chance Rides Rotor, believed to have been one of fewer than six operating Rotors in North America. It was replaced by Nordic Chaser.
- Falcon's Flight, (2017–2022) a HUSS Condor.
- Monsoon, (1992–2022) a 55 ft Shoot-the-Chute water ride. Monsoon was the only ride accessible to both Worlds of Fun and Oceans of Fun guests when the parks had separate admission.

=== Other attractions ===
- Snoopy's Hot Summer Lights, (2010) an immersive light and sound experience featuring the Peanuts characters. The attraction featured over 2 million LED lights and a variety of audio soundtracks through the Africa and Europa sections of the park. Along the walkway there were replicas of Snoopy and other characters for guests to view. Snoopy's Hot Summer Lights was a one million dollar investment that used special effects and sound design, custom designed for Worlds of Fun by Emmy Award-Winning RWS and Associates. Snoopy's Hot Summer Lights opened for its original run on June 4 and ran through September 5, 2010.

== Oceans of Fun ==
Oceans of Fun is Worlds of Fun's water park. It opened in 1982 as the world's largest water park. It is included with admission to Worlds of Fun, beginning in the 2013 season.

== Fast Lane ==
Fast Lane is Worlds of Fun's "two line" system introduced in 2012. For an increased cost (in addition to normal admission charges), visitors receive a wrist band that enables them to bypass the standby line and enter the "Fast Lane" line to significantly reduce their wait time.

As of the 2026 season, Fast Lane access is available on the following rides:

=== Worlds of Fun ===
- Boomerang
- Fury of the Nile
- Le Taxi Tour
- Mamba
- Mustang Runner
- Patriot
- Prowler
- Scandi Scrambler
- SteelHawk
- Timber Wolf (single-use Fast Lane only)
- Viking Voyager
- Zambezi Zinger

=== Oceans of Fun ===
- Caribbean Cooler
- Hurricane Falls
- Predators Plunge
- Riptide Raceway
- Sharks Revenge

During Halloween Haunt, a similar system named "Fright Lane" is sold. Serving the same purpose as Fast Lane, it significantly reduces the wait times at select haunted attractions. "Fright Lane+" includes a "Skeleton Key", a key that grants holders special access to secret, intense rooms in six of the eight haunted houses. In addition, holders receive special seating for Ed Alonzo's Psycho Circus of Magic and Mayhem. "Fright Lane Max" is a VIP system that allows holders seating at Overlord's Awakening, a meal, and limited edition Haunt T-shirts, in addition to all the perks listed above.

== Worlds of Fun Village ==
In 2005, Worlds of Fun opened the first on-site resort. The campground is adjacent to the park, and is located south of Mamba. The Village has 22 cabins, 20 cottages, and 82 RV sites, complete with electric and TV cable hookups. Each cabin or cottage can fit 6–8 people.

== Halloween Haunt ==

Worlds of Fun's history of fall seasonal events began with the Oktoberfest-themed festival, a staple of the park since its opening in 1973. Halloween-themed events were introduced in 1992 with the debut of the family-oriented Boo! Bash, held over the final two weekends that coincided with the Oktoberfest period. Over the following years, the Halloween program expanded in both scope and duration.

By 1998, the event had developed into two separate components: Boo! Blast, designed for younger visitors, and Halloween Haunt, aimed at older guests. In 1999, the combined events were officially titled Halloweekends, a name retained until the 2007 rebranding as Halloween Haunt. The park's first haunted maze, "Carnival of Carnivorous Clowns," opened in 2003.

In 2025, Worlds of Fun announced that guests would have to pay an additional fee to enter the haunted mazes during Halloween Haunt, which had previously been included as part of regular admission. However, Six Flags later reversed this policy by mid-October at four of their parks, including Worlds of Fun, removing the separate fee and including maze access with park admission for the remainder of the year.

=== Current attractions ===
As of 2026, it features ten haunts, including six mazes and four scare zones, along with five live shows.

Attraction	Type	Opened	Location	Theme
BloodShed	Maze	2007	Planet Snoopy	Slaughterhouse
Pumpkin Eater: Dead Harvest	Maze	2023	Morocco	Pumpkin Patch
Ripper Alley	Maze	2017	Americana	Victorian London
Lore of the Vampire	Maze	2004	East Asia	Vampires
Blood on the Bayou	Maze	2015	Americana	Voodoo Spirits
Zombie High	Maze	2012	Serengeti	Zombies
Mr. Tickle's Sideshow Alley	Zone	2026	Forum Road	Clowns
Outlaw's Revenge	Zone	2008	Wild West	Cowboys
Invasion	Zone	2026	Serengeti	Bugs
Necroplis	Zone	2026	East Asia	Cemetery

Show	Type	Location
Overlord's Awakening	Monologue/Parade	Gateway Gardens
Haunted Homecoming	Music Performance	Moulin Rouge
Spellbound	Music Performance	Gateway Gardens
Conjure The Night	Dance Performance	Gateway Gardens
Mr. Tickle's Last Laff	Dance Performance	Country Junction

=== Former Haunt attractions ===
Attraction Name	Replaced By	Year closed
Camp Gonnagitcha Wichahatchet	CornStalkers	2009
Carnival of Carnivorous Clowns	CarnEvil	2006
Dominion of Doom	London Terror	2010
Master McCarthy's Doll Factory	Miss Lizzie's Chamber of Horrors	2012
Fright Zone	The Boneyard	2014
Club Blood	Lore of the Vampire expansion	2015
Asylum Island	Urgent Scare	2017
London Terror	Ripper Alley	2017
CarnEvil	Peter Peter Pumpkin Eater	2019
Urgent Scare	Khaos Unleashed	2018
Miss Lizzie's Chamber of Horrors	Chamber of Horrors: Condemned	2018
Khaos Unleashed	N/A	2021
The Boneyard	Fright Zone (Reimagined)	2021
Feargrounds	N/A	2023
Chamber of Horrors: Condemned	N/A	2022
Peter Peter Pumpkin Eater	Pumpkin Eater: Dead Harvest	2023
Fright Zone (Reimagined)	Abyss	2023
Malice in Wonderland	Mad Hatter's Tea Party	2024
Mad Hatter's Tea Party	N/A	2025
Ghost Train	N/A	2025
Abyss	Invasion	2026
Shadowmoor Cemetery	Necroplis	2026
CornStalkers	Pumpkin Eater: Dead Harvest	2026

== Gallery ==
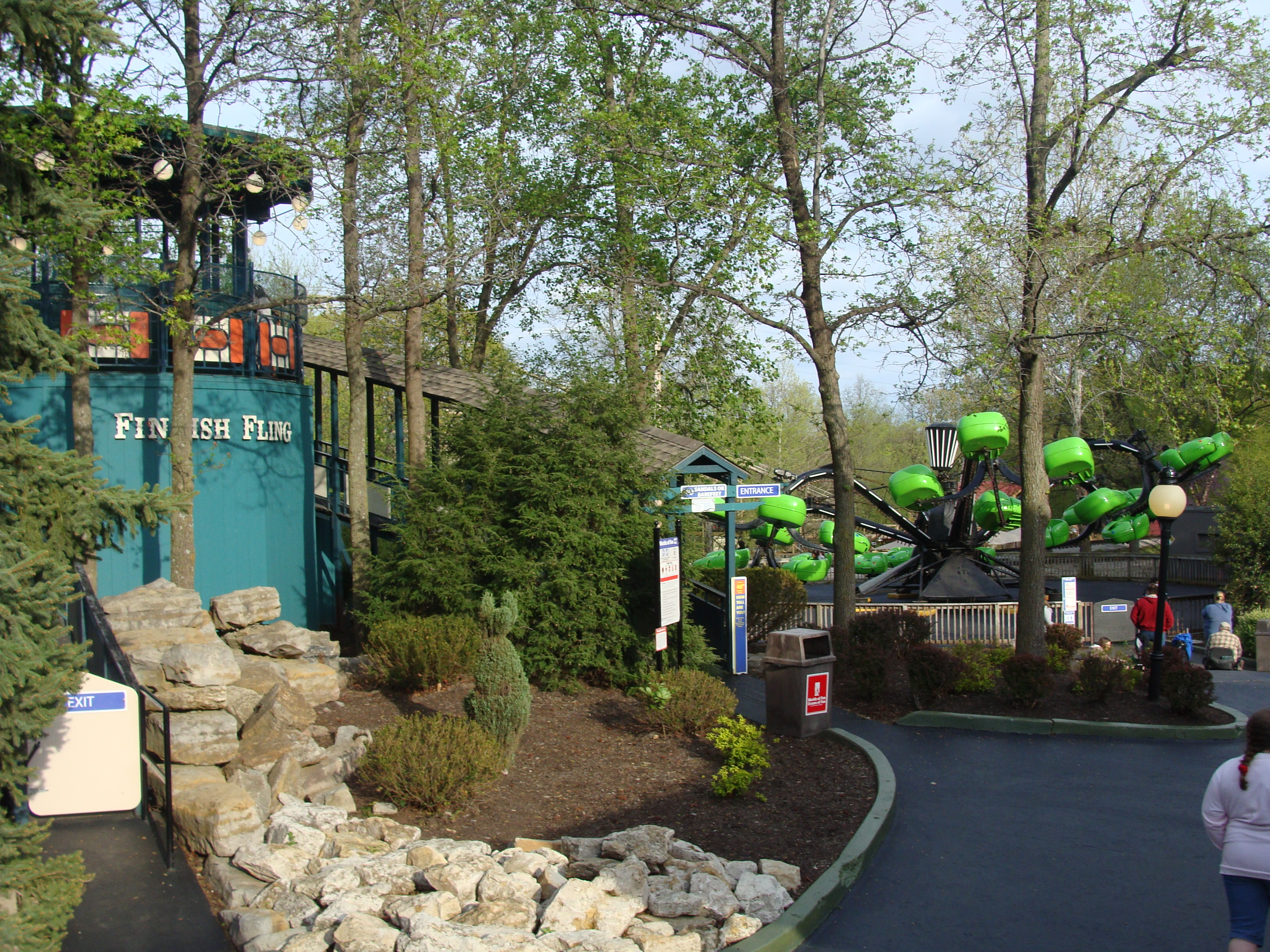
Finnish Fling and Octopus rides.

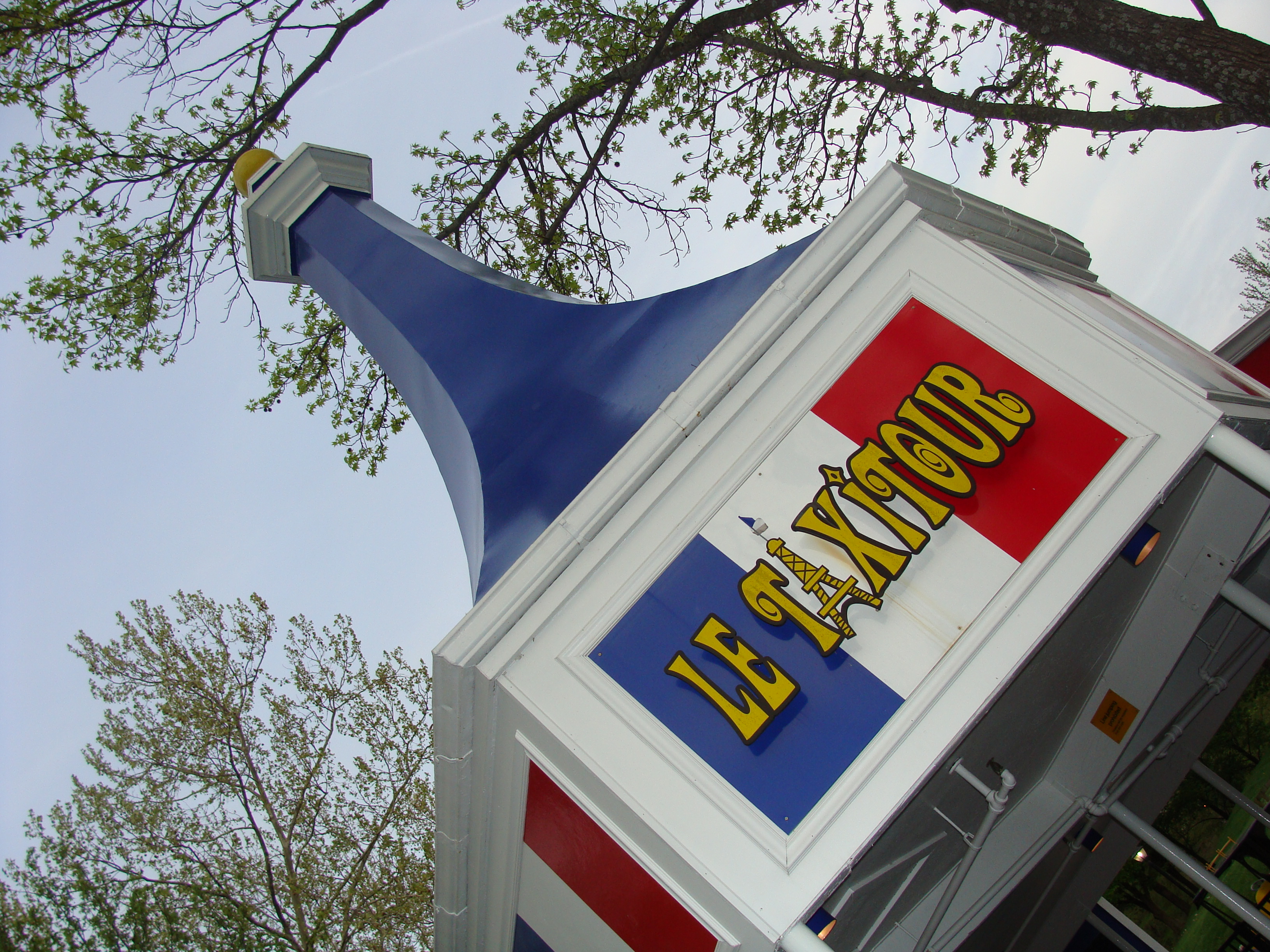
Le Taxi Tour's line queue in Europa.

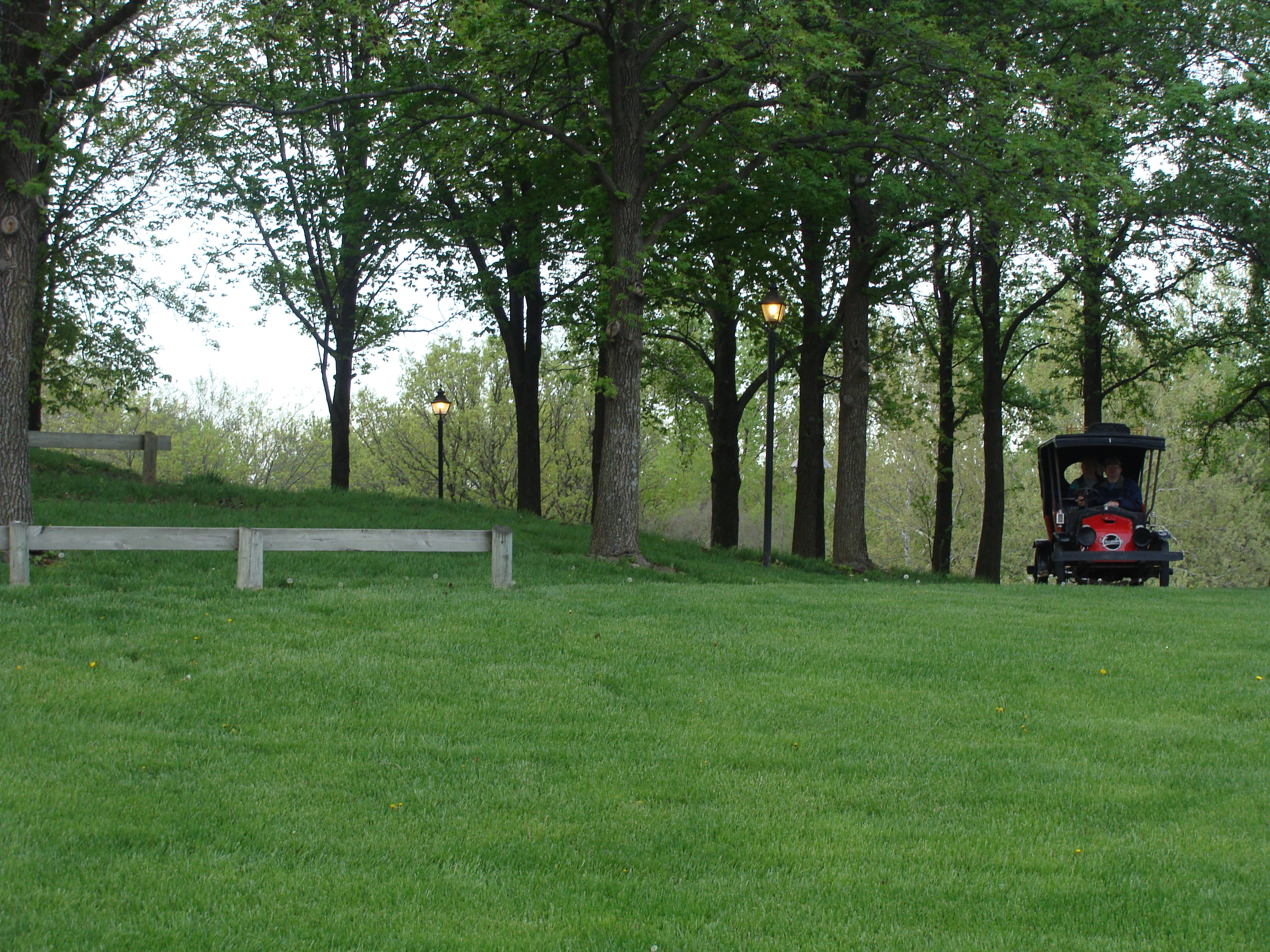
Le Taxi Tour in action.

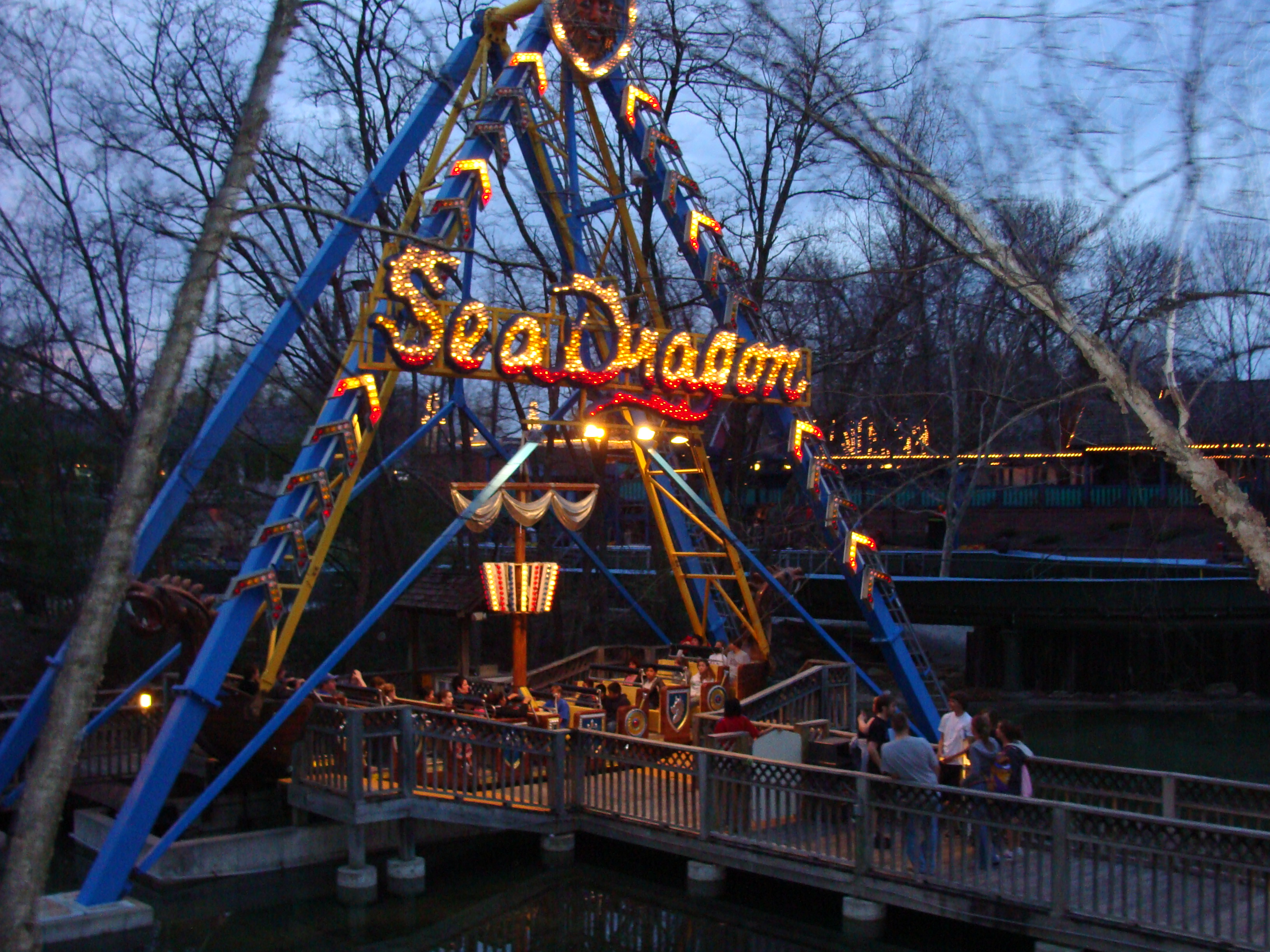
The Sea Dragon in Scandinavia

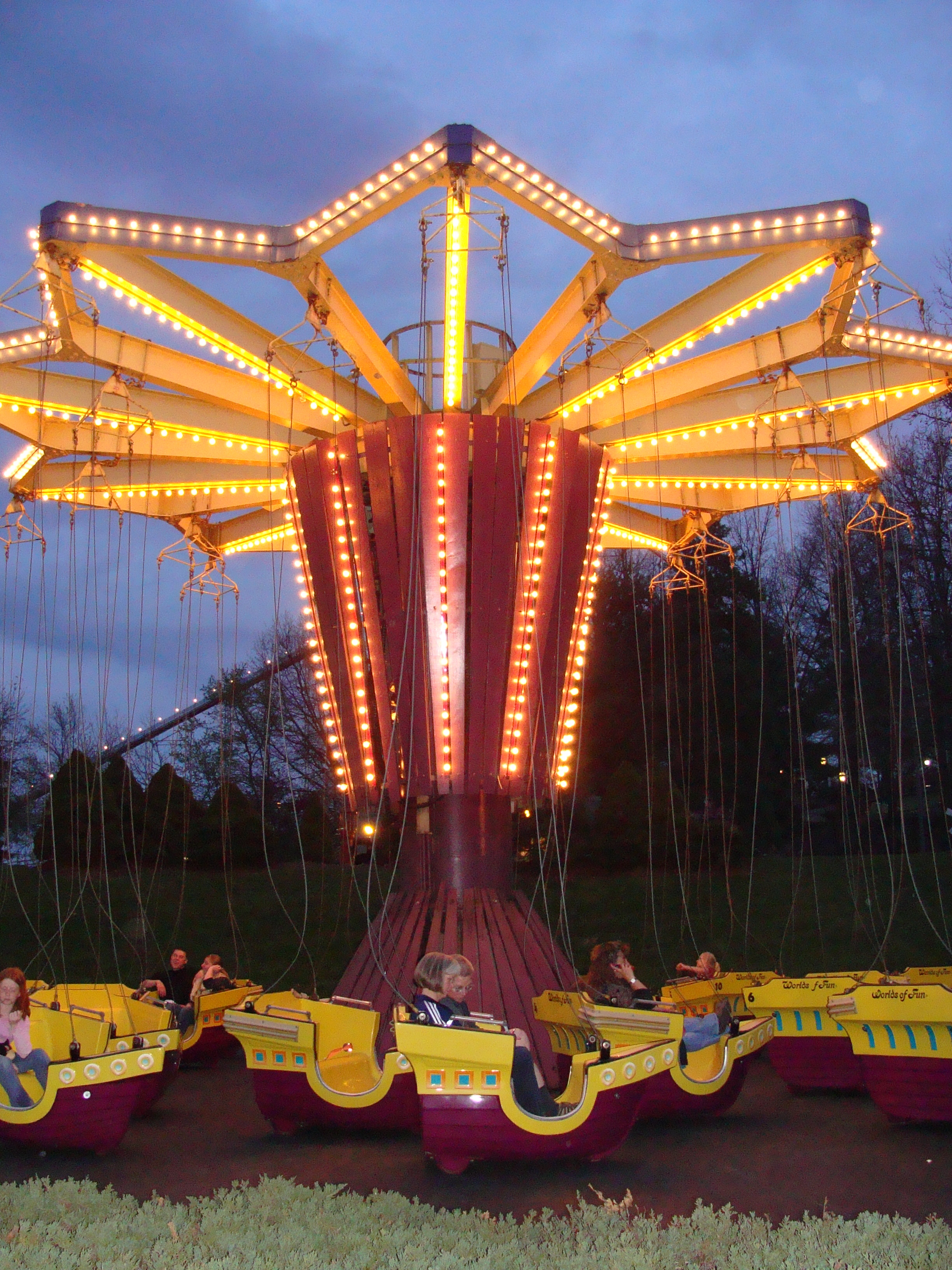
The Flying Dutchman is reported to be founder Lamar Hunt's favorite ride.

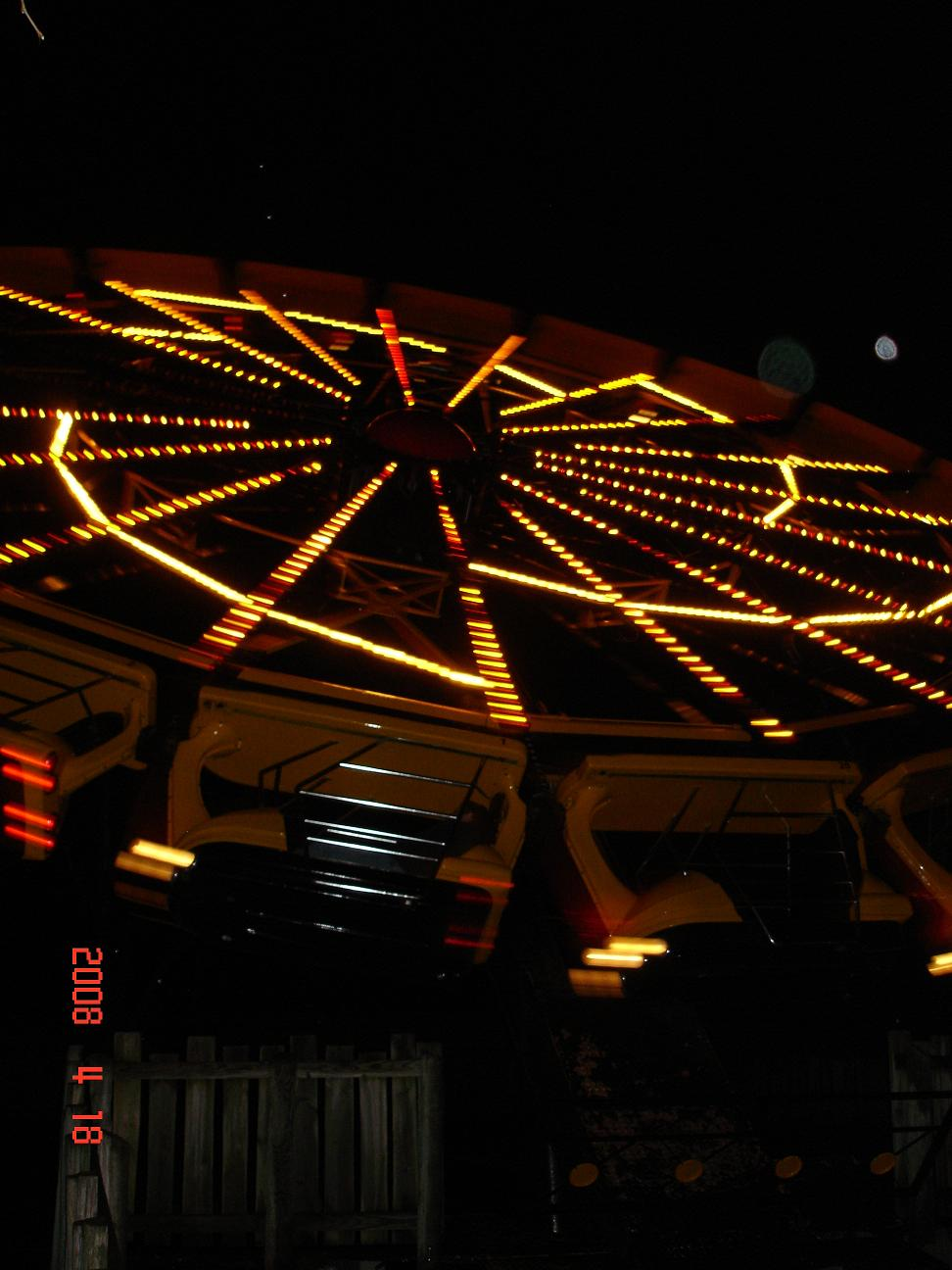
Zulu at night

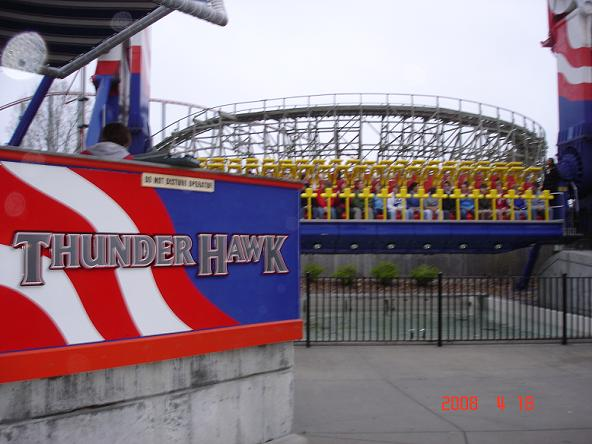
Thunderhawk

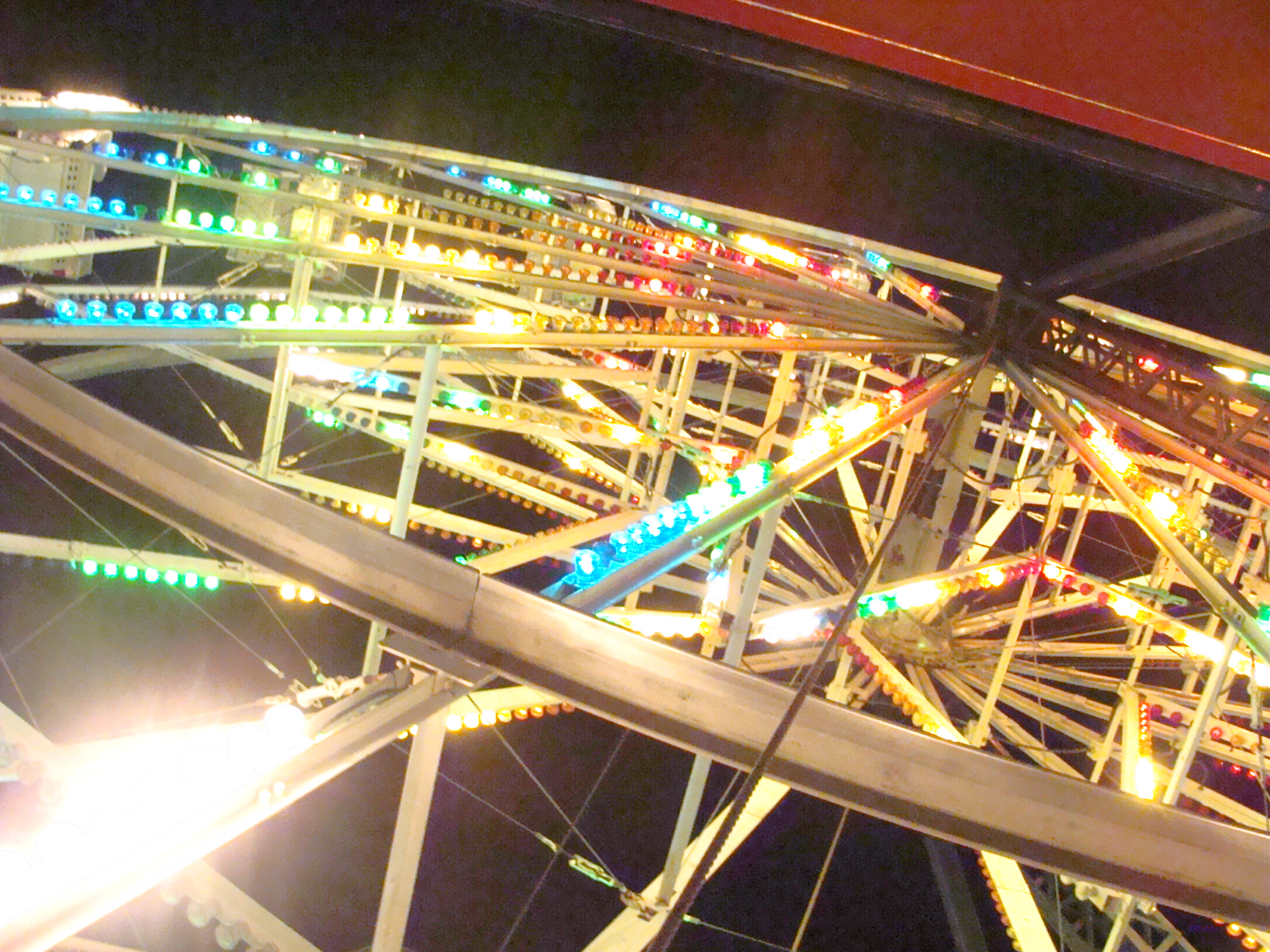
The Skyliner Ferris wheel at Worlds of Fun.

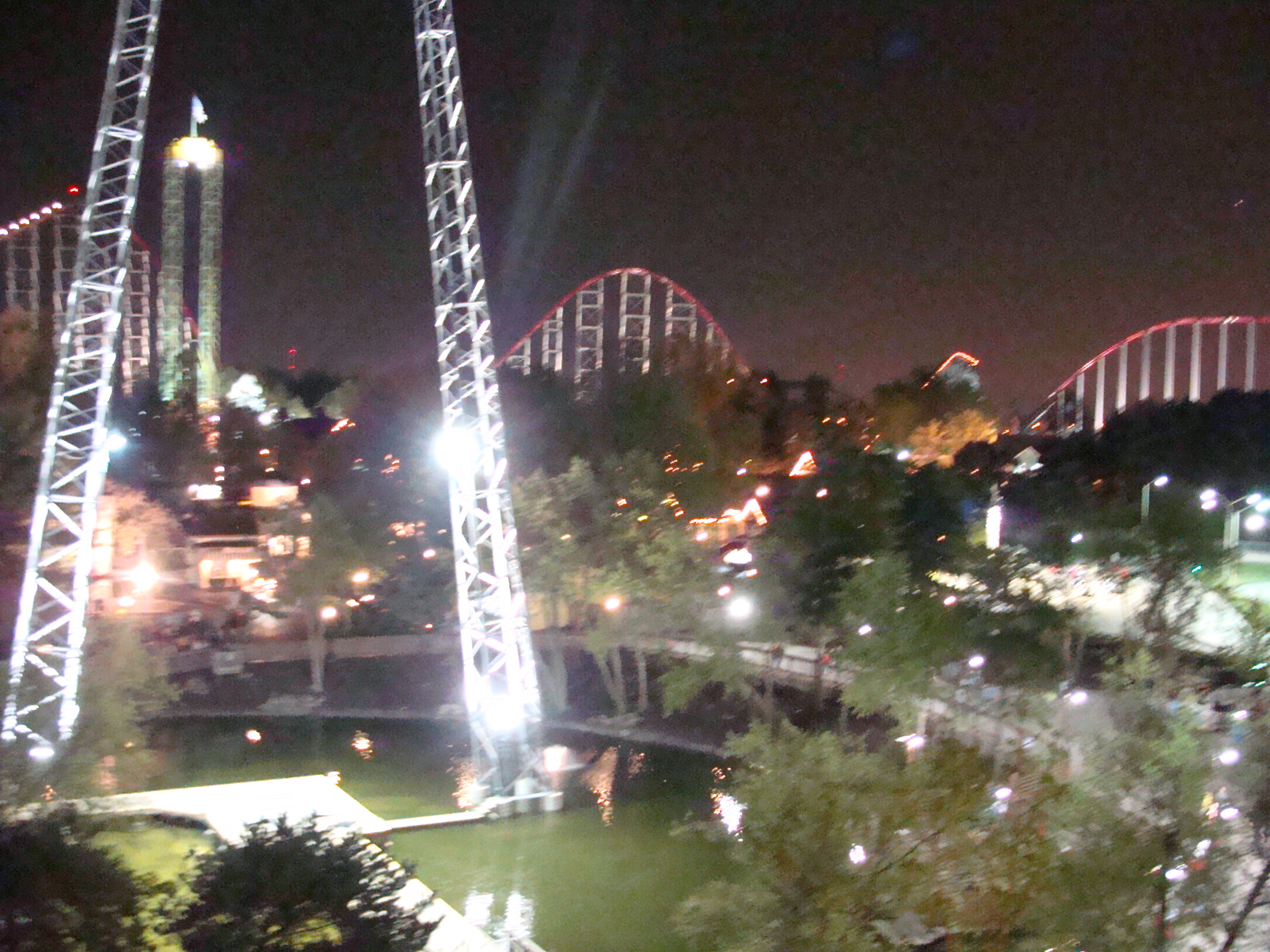
Nighttime at Worlds of Fun.

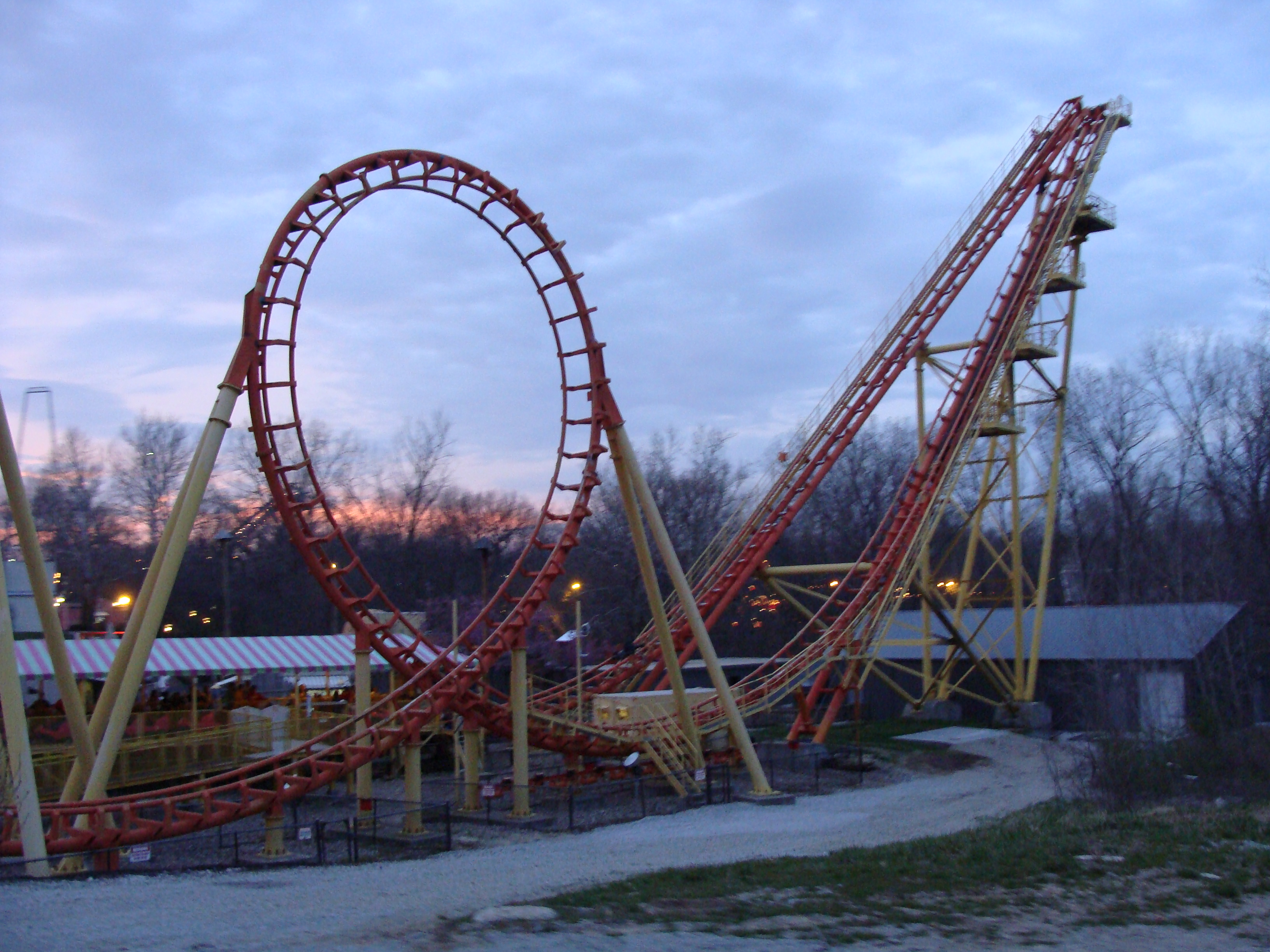
Boomerang's full profile

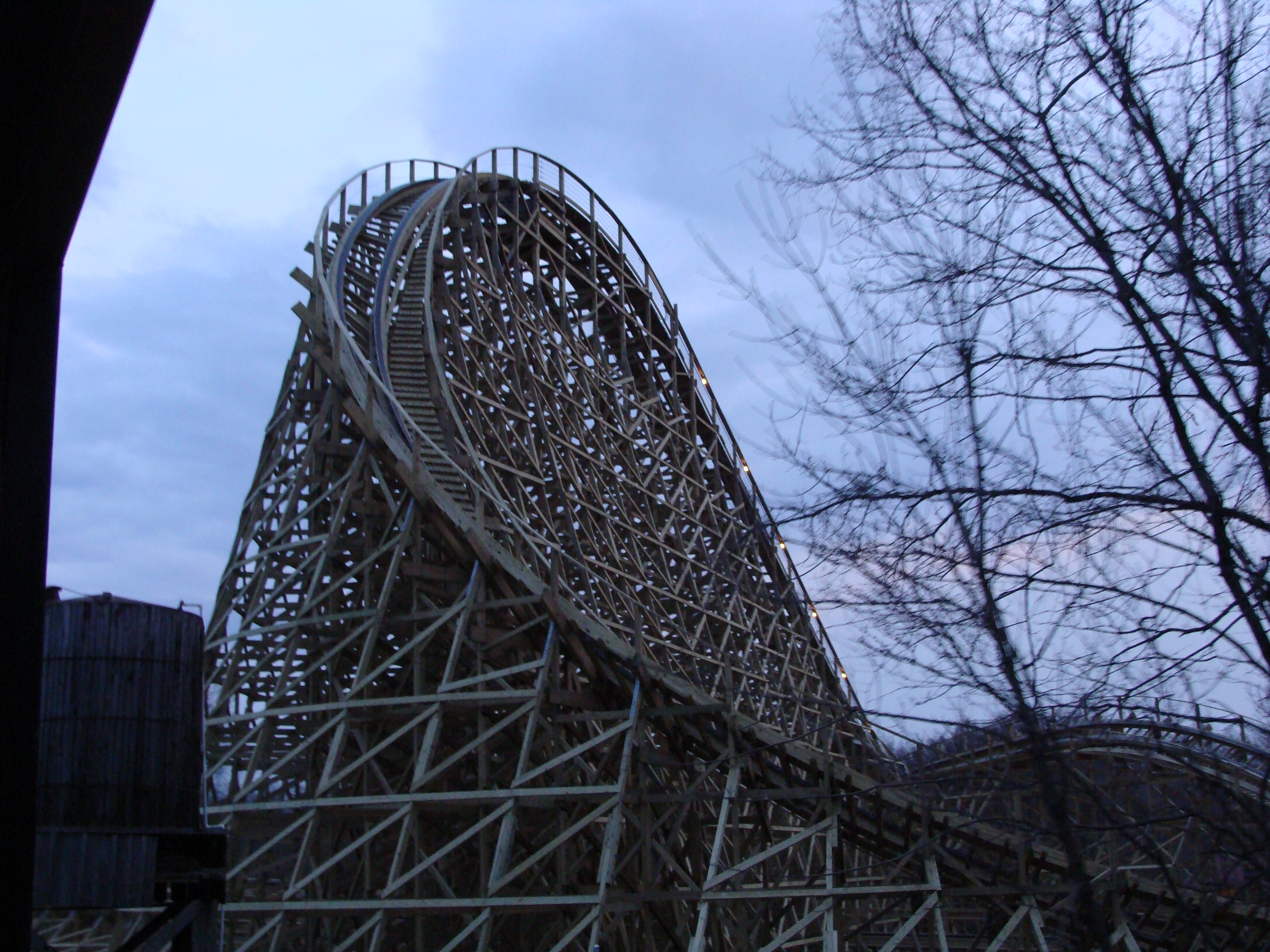
Prowler's main drop.

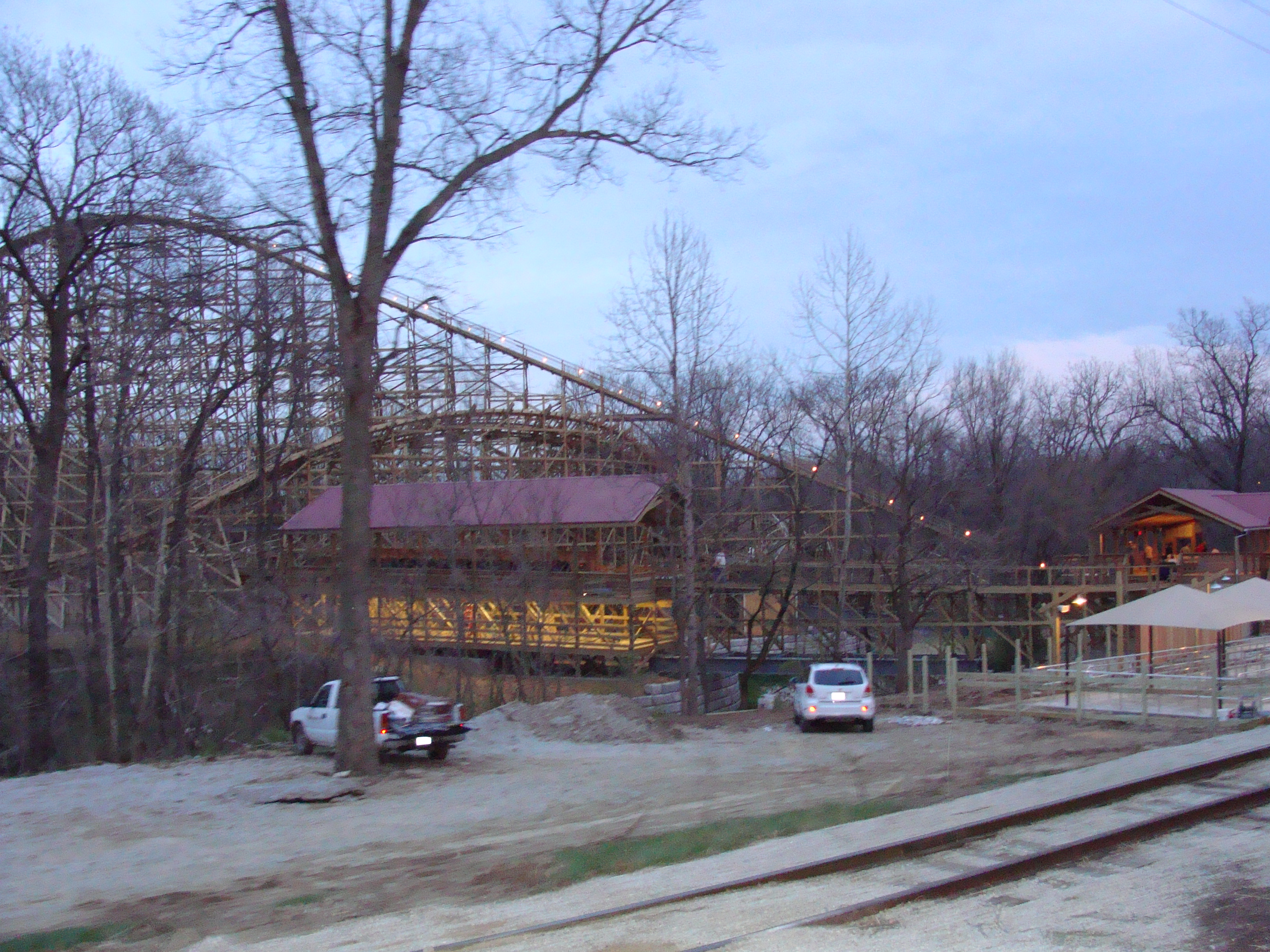
Prowler's queue line.

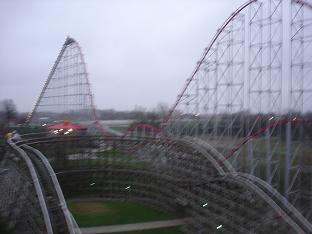
Mamba and Timber Wolf.

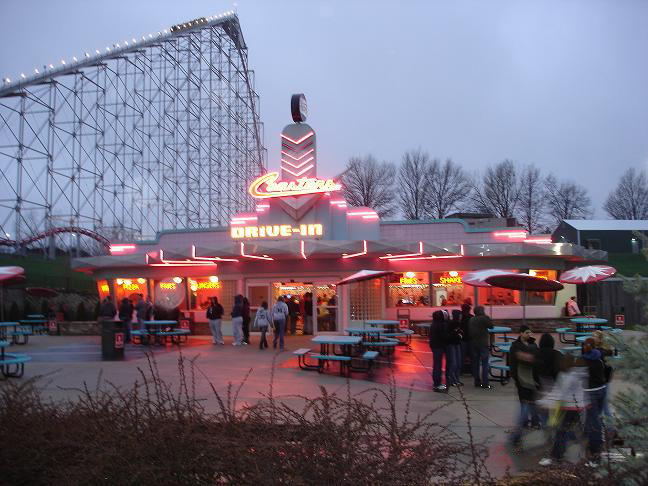
Coaster's Diner near Mamba.

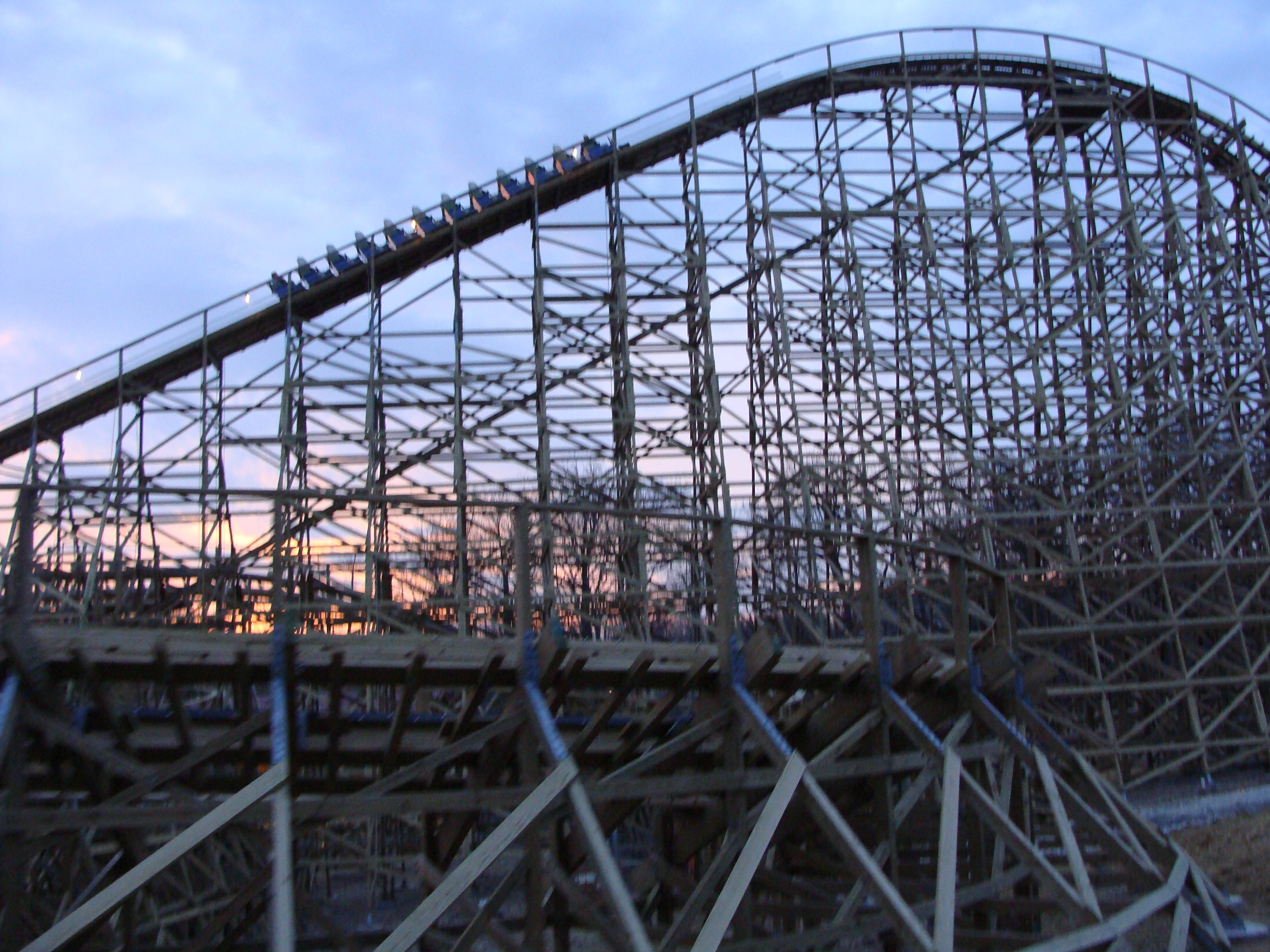
Prowler's train ascending the lift hill.

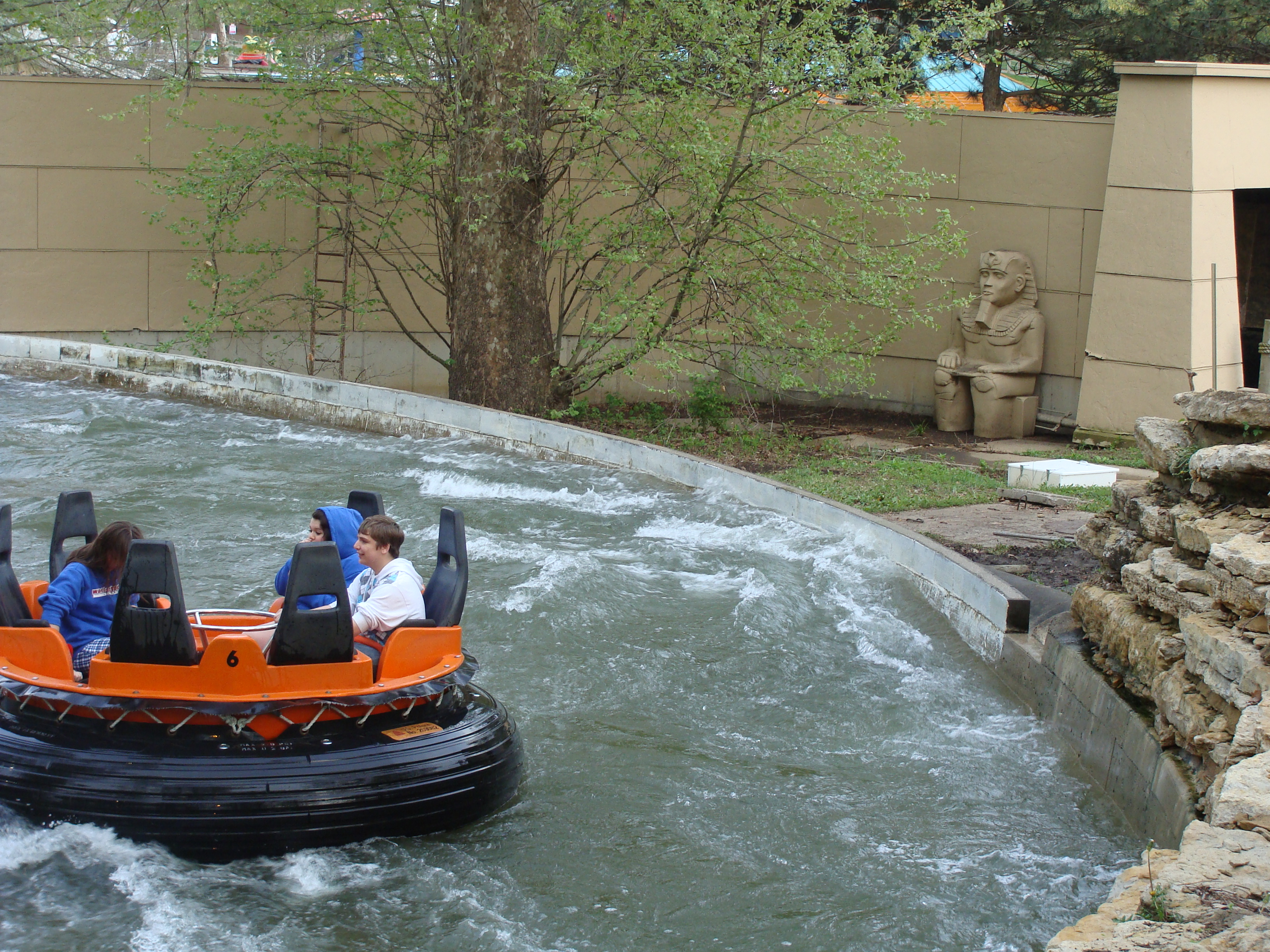
Fury of the Nile in action.

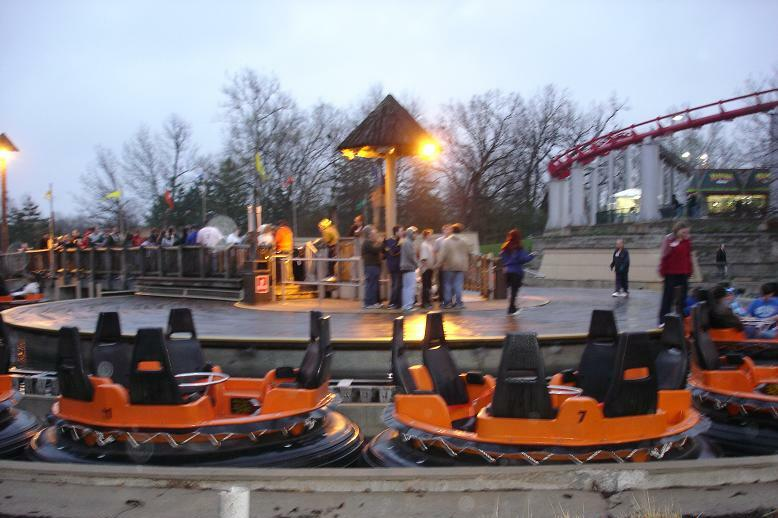
Fury of the Nile's signature turnstile dock.

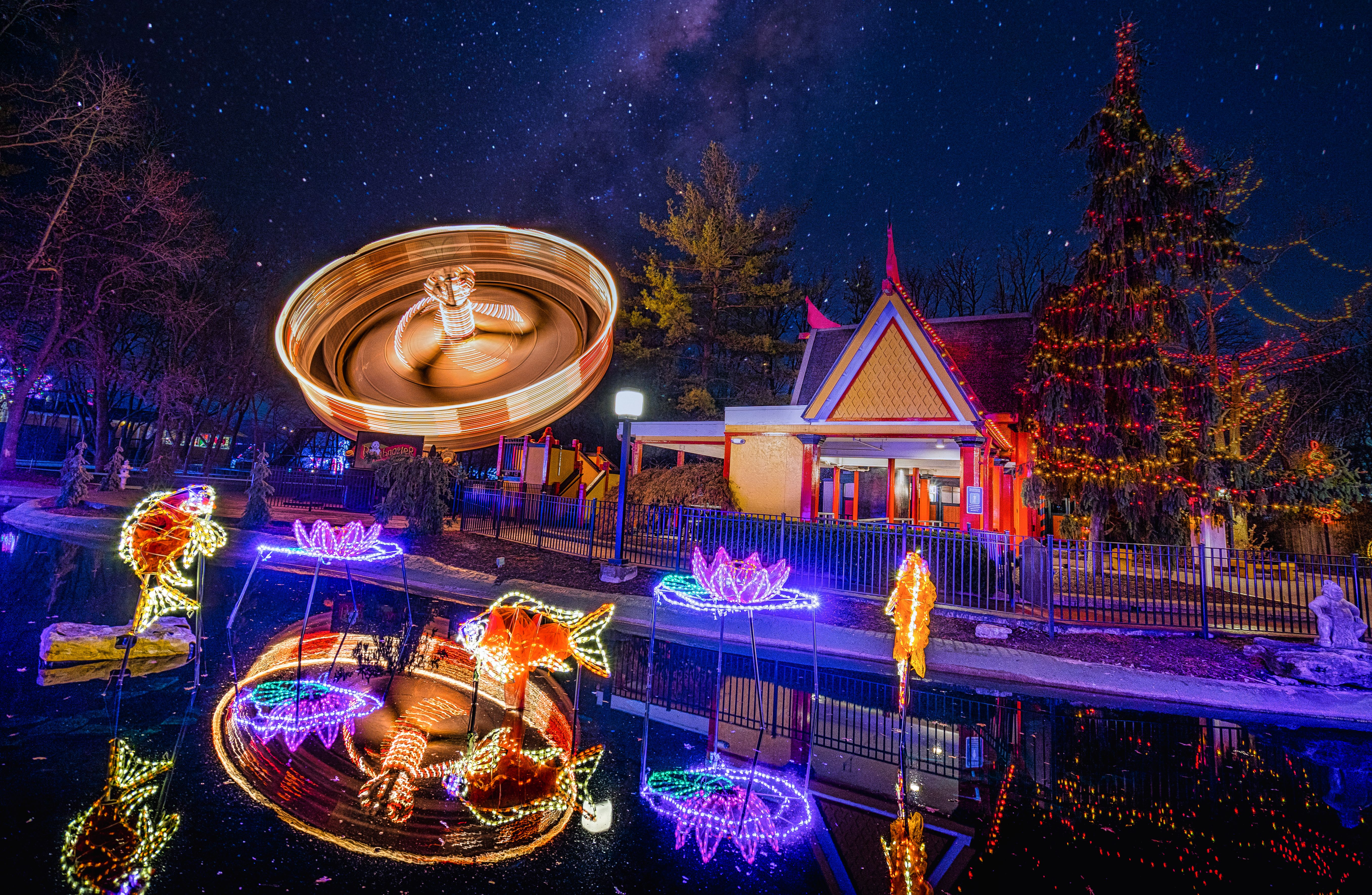
Bomboozler operating during Winterfest 2019.

== Incidents ==
=== Barnstormer ===
- In July 1978, during the ride's first season of operation, a malfunction of the 100-foot-tall Barnstormer caused the spinning planes carrying riders to descend rapidly, hitting each other on the way down. Some riders were also sprayed with hydraulic fluid. In total, 20 riders suffered minor injuries.

=== Fury of the Nile ===
- On June 19, 1984, two boats collided and caused one to capsize. Two riders were injured, including a 6-year-old boy who suffered a broken leg, resulting in minor changes to the ride to prevent future occurrences. The park settled with the injured boy's family for $30,000.

=== Halloween Haunt ===
- On September 13, 2025, the park was evacuated on the opening night of its annual Halloween Haunt event following a report of gunshots. Police responded to the scene and later determined the sound was caused by fireworks, finding no evidence of a shooting or any injuries.

=== Mamba ===
- In October 2025, multiple guests reported that the seatbelts on the ride had unlatched during its operation: once on October 11 and again on October 12. Inspectors from the Missouri Division of Fire Safety evaluated the coaster and determined some seatbelts were "not functioning properly." The ride was taken out of service for repairs, during which time 18 seatbelt buckles were replaced. A park spokesperson explained that the ride is equipped with a "multi-layered restraint system," meaning that the seatbelts are a redundant safety feature, and that the ride had operated safely since the initial concerns were raised.

=== Oceans of Fun ===
- On August 24, 2019, Trey Wallace, a 14-year-old boy, drowned in the wave pool. The boy died in the hospital after being taken off life support due to loss of brain function.

=== Orient Express ===
- On June 14, 1987, a train that was pulling into the loading station malfunctioned and slammed into the rear of the other train inside of the roller coaster station. A total of 56 passengers were involved in the accident, but only 8 were taken to the hospital for injuries.
- On July 17, 1999, two cars of a seven-car train derailed due to severe internal metal fatigue in a support post, stranding 18 people. Two were immediately taken to a hospital, and six went later. None of the injuries were life-threatening.

=== Screamroller ===
- On May 18, 1976, Robbie M. Meyers, an 8-year-old boy, was struck and seriously injured by the Screamroller after entering a restricted area. In 1977, Meyers was awarded $1.39 million (equivalent to $7.39 million in 2025) in a lawsuit finding Mid-America Enterprises responsible for his injuries. Worlds of Fun did not appeal the decision.

=== Timber Wolf ===
- On March 31, 1990, two trains collided just short of the loading platform, injuring 35 people. The control system had malfunctioned and was unable to control two trains at once. The ride reopened with a single train until the control system was fixed to handle two.
- On June 30, 1995, Ryan Bielby, a 14-year-old girl, fell from her seat on the roller coaster and died. The park owner at the time, Hunt-Midwest Entertainment Inc., and the ride manufacturer, Dinn Corporation, claimed that she was switching seats when the accident occurred. A riding companion and Bielby's family claimed that safety restraints (a lap bar and seat belt) had come undone on a sharp turn at the top of one of the ride's hills. In contrast, officials from Worlds of Fun claimed that witnesses had seen her removing her restraints and attempting to switch seats, and that there had been no malfunction. The ride was temporarily closed for an investigation of its safety features, which led to the installation of new lap bars. Hunt-Midwest Entertainment Inc. and Dinn Corporation settled with the family for $200,000. This makes the Timber Wolf the only ride so far at Worlds of Fun with a fatality.

== In popular culture ==
Cole Lindbergh, former manager of the park's games department, was featured in a 2011 episode of Public Radio International's This American Life, "Amusement Park." In the nine-minute prologue, host Ira Glass interviews Lindbergh about his management philosophy and plays segments from several YouTube videos he made to promote the park's games.

Worlds of Fun was used as the setting for a sketch in a 2021 episode of Saturday Night Live. The sketch opens with a still photo of the park's iconic hot-air balloon sign and then cuts to the cast getting ready to ride Viking Voyager. The park's logo can be seen in the sketch and other rides such as Mamba and Zulu are referenced as well. Former cast member Heidi Gardner, who was born and raised in the Kansas City area, stars in the sketch.

The park also appears in the HBO series The Last of Us in which Mamba was featured as the characters drive north on I-435.

== See also ==
- Closed rides and attractions at Worlds of Fun
