= Viking Voyager =

Log flume ride at Worlds of Fun

Coordinates: 39.17497°N 94.48601°W

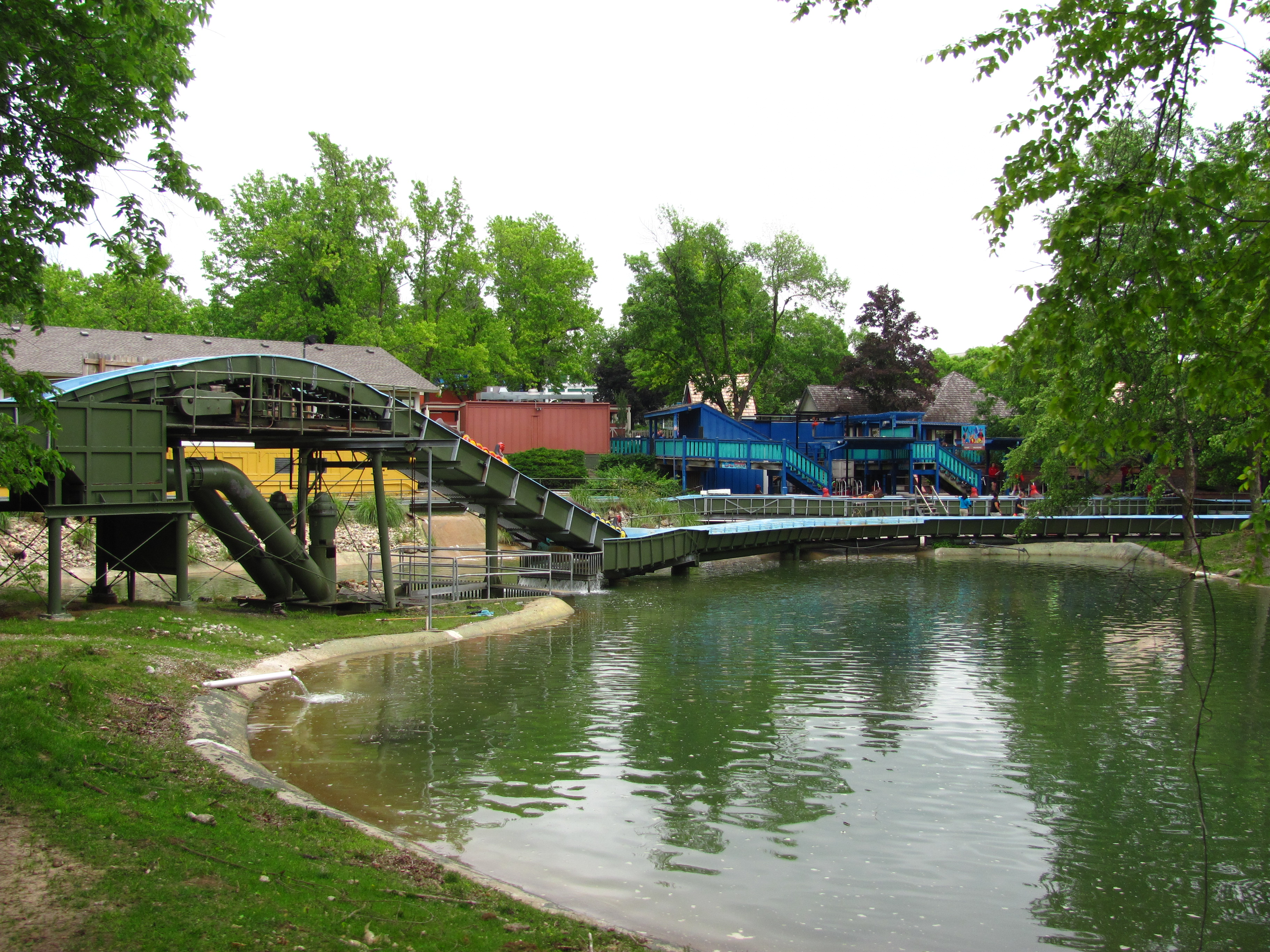

Worlds of Fun
- Area: Scandinavia
- Status: Operating
- Opening date: May 26, 1973; 52 years ago

General statistics
- Type: Log flume
- Manufacturer: Arrow Development
- Drop: 45 ft (14 m)
- Duration: 2:40
- Height restriction: 46 in (117 cm)
- Fast Lane available

Viking Voyager is a Viking-themed log flume ride located at the Worlds of Fun amusement park in Kansas City, Missouri. In operation since the park's opening in 1973, it is among the park's original attractions.

== History ==
Viking Voyager was among the attractions present at the opening of Worlds of Fun in 1973. It is a log flume-type ride manufactured by Arrow Development.

Viking Voyager has undergone modifications throughout its operational history. In 1993, the original boats, with Viking-style dragon heads on their bow, were replaced by redesigned boats that excluded the heads. A new control system was installed in 2016 to improve the attraction's operation, and the water pumps were replaced in 2025. Over the 2025–2026 off-season, the flume underwent refurbishment.

== Ride experience ==
Riders board log flume boats designed to resemble Viking longships. The ride begins with a brief float along the water channel toward the first, smaller lift hill. Following a short, gentle decline from this elevated section, the boats navigate a winding course through a wooded area. This course leads to the second, taller lift hill, which culminates in a descent of approximately 45-foot splashdown into a body of water. The boats then return to the loading station.

== Cultural references ==
The American television program Saturday Night Live featured Viking Voyager in a sketch in February 2021. The sketch depicted a group of teenagers at Worlds of Fun interacting while waiting in line for the ride and trying to decide rider pairings.
