= Detonator (Worlds of Fun) =

Ride at Worlds of Fun

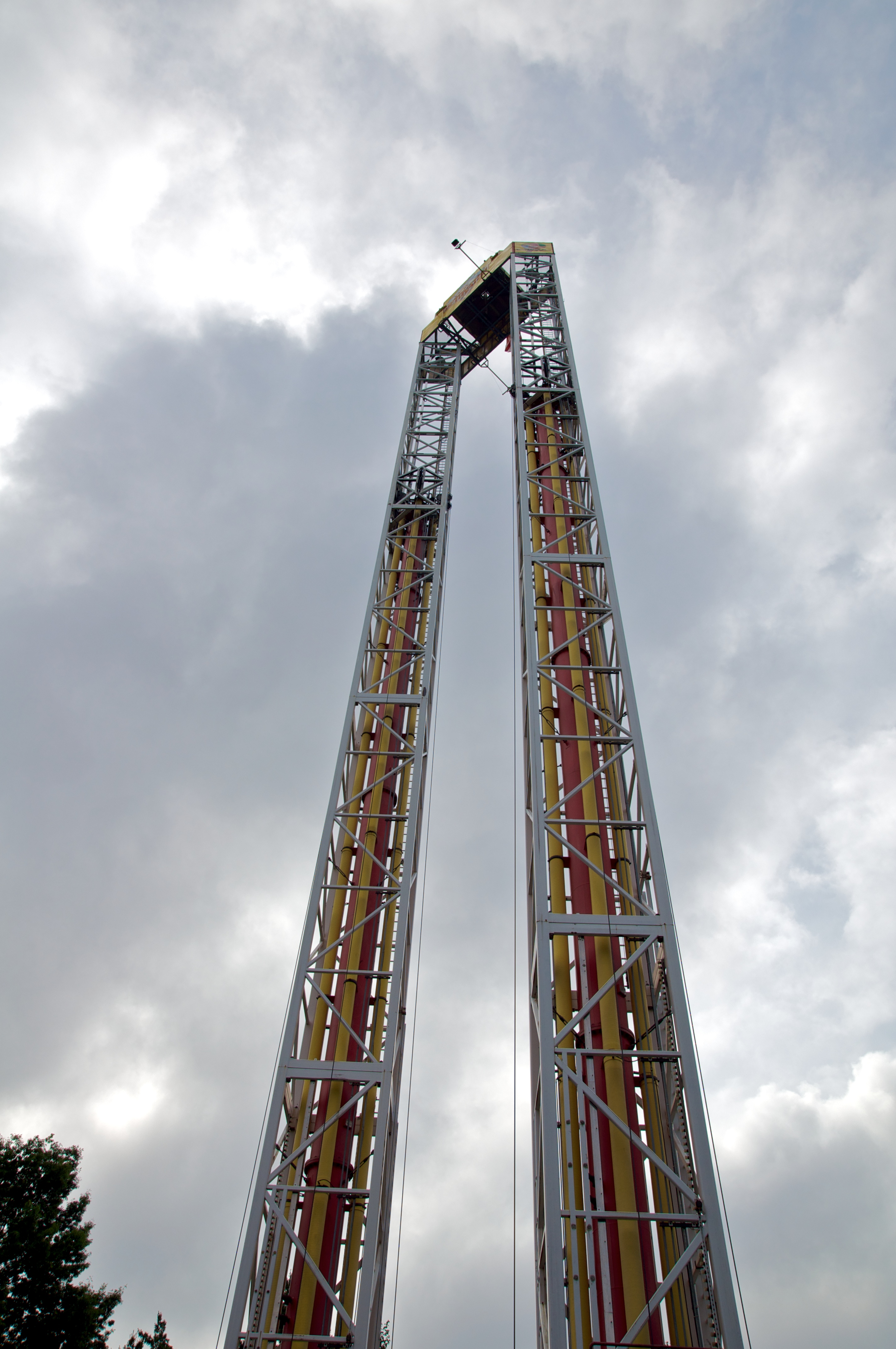

Worlds of Fun
- Area: Wild West
- Status: Operating
- Opening date: 1996

Ride statistics
- Attraction type: Space Shot
- Manufacturer: S&S Worldwide
- Height: 210 ft (64 m)
- Drop: 150 ft (46 m)
- Speed: 45 mph (72 km/h)
- G-force: 4.5 up,-1g down
- Capacity: 810 riders per hour
- Vehicles: 2
- Riders per vehicle: 12
- Duration: 1 min 32 sec
- Height restriction: 48 in (122 cm)
- Number of towers: 2

Detonator is a Space Shot ride at Worlds of Fun in Kansas City, Missouri. It made history as the first Space Shot ride in the United States, as well as the first in the world to have a twin-tower form. Detonator is a 210 foot tower that launches riders 150 feet in the air at 45 mph (4.5 g-force), and then drops at negative 1 g-force. It operates on compressed air with 5000 horsepower. The air pressure is located in a central tube and the compressed air is distributed through 16 inch valves.

Detonator is classified as a Mach I Space Shot ride. This classification is only shared with Big Shot, the Space Shot at The Strat in Las Vegas, Nevada. A characteristic of the Mach I design is that the air cylinders and tanks do not ascend the entire height of the tower, which creates a "slingshot" sensation for riders. This design differs from newer versions, which are known as Mach II.
