= Detonator theory =

Detonator theory may refer to:

- Theories pertaining to the chemical process of detonation
- In political science, a theory of insurrection likening political discontent to explosive material
