= Blue Barnacle =

Swinging pirate ship ride

Coordinates: 51.34749°N 0.31697°W

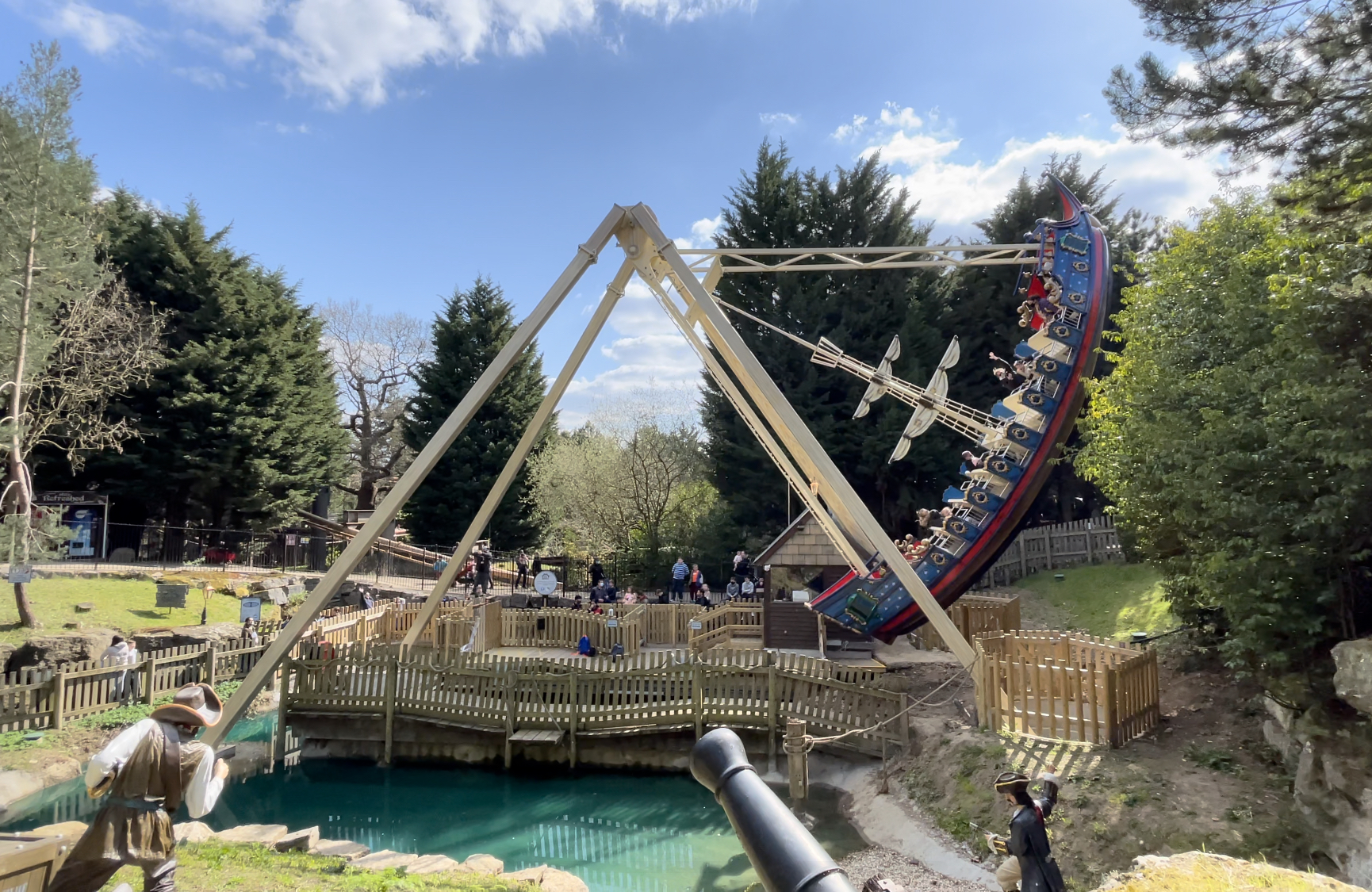

Chessington World of Adventures
- Area: Shipwreck Coast
- Status: Operating
- Soft opening date: 14 April 2021
- Opening date: 16 April 2021; 4 years ago
- Replaced: Black Buccaneer

Ride statistics
- Attraction type: Flat Ride
- Manufacturer: Metallbau Emmeln
- Model: Pirate Ship
- Theme: Pirates
- Capacity: 650 riders per hour
- Rows: 10
- Height restriction: 110 cm (3 ft 7 in)
- Reserve and Ride available
- Wheelchair accessible
- Must transfer from wheelchair

Blue Barnacle is swinging mock pirate ship which opened in April 2021 at Chessington World of Adventures in southwest London, England as a replacement for the now defunct Black Buccaneer. The ride forms part of the Shipwreck Coast section of the park. It was named by Jennifer Hawkins, who won the competition in 2020, however the ride's opening was postponed to the next year due to covid-19.

== History ==
Following the closure of Black Buccaneer at the end of 2018, the ride was removed during the 2019 season. In January 2020, the park held a social media competition to name the attraction's replacement. Blue Barnacle was the winning name. Due to the COVID-19 pandemic, the new ride's intended opening of 2020 was postponed to 2021.

In 2022 Pirates Cove was transformed into Shipwreck Coast, with the theming of the area being updated to feature more influence from the architecture of coastal villages and towns. In addition, the valley surrounding Blue Barnacle became the home of a flock of Bagot goats.

== Description ==
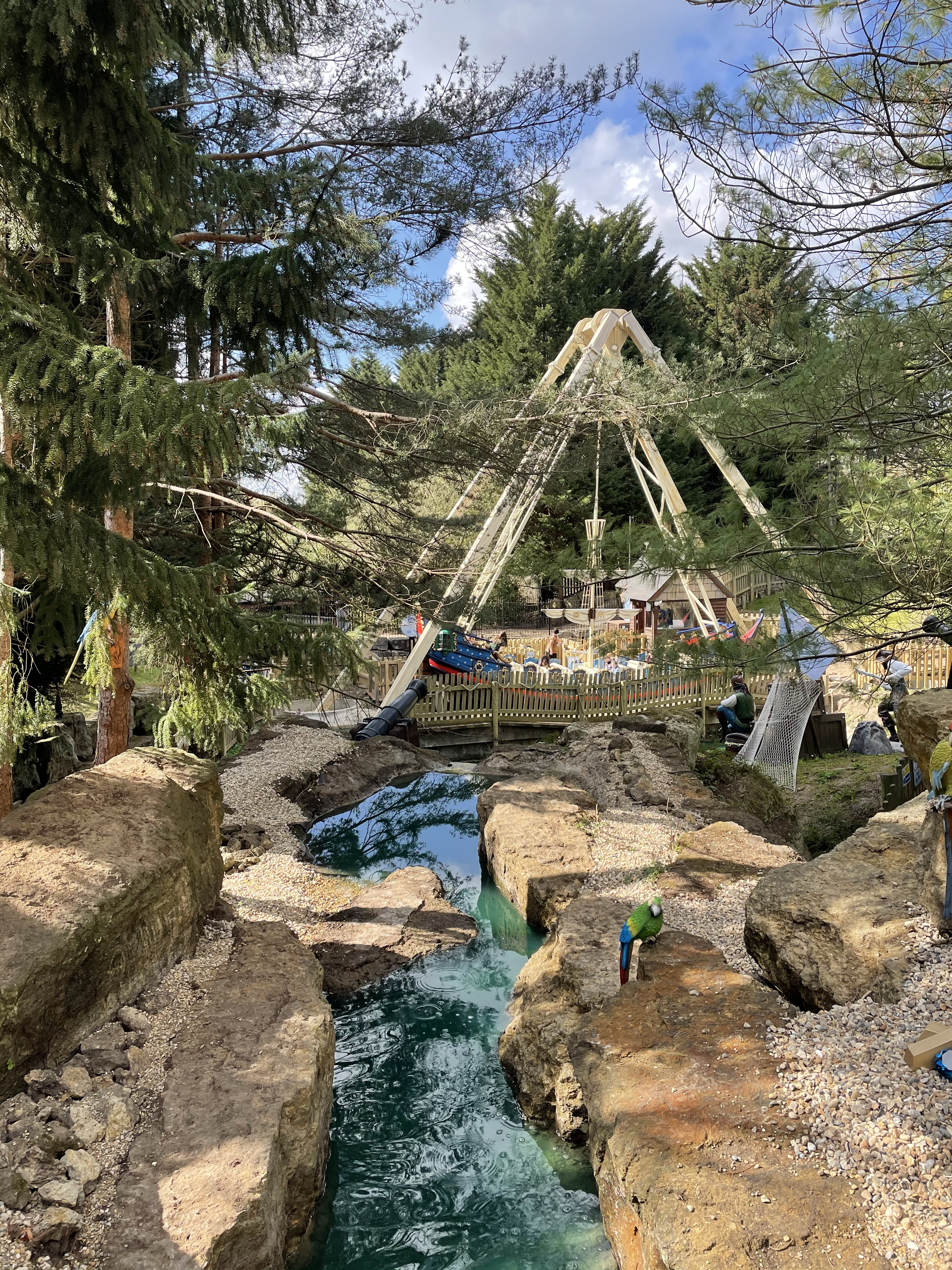
Blue Barnacle's landscaping and theming

Blue Barnacle is a type of amusement ride consisting of an open, seated gondola (usually in the style of a pirate ship) which swings back and forth, subjecting the rider to various levels of angular momentum.

The attraction is manufactured by German company 'Metallbau Emmeln' and sports a blue, red and white colour scheme. The ride is 11m tall and can sit 42 riders per cycle, as well as a capacity of 650 riders per hour. Those between 1.1m and 1.3m must be accompanied by an adult over the age of 16, while those a minimum height of 1.3m can ride alone.

== Gallery ==
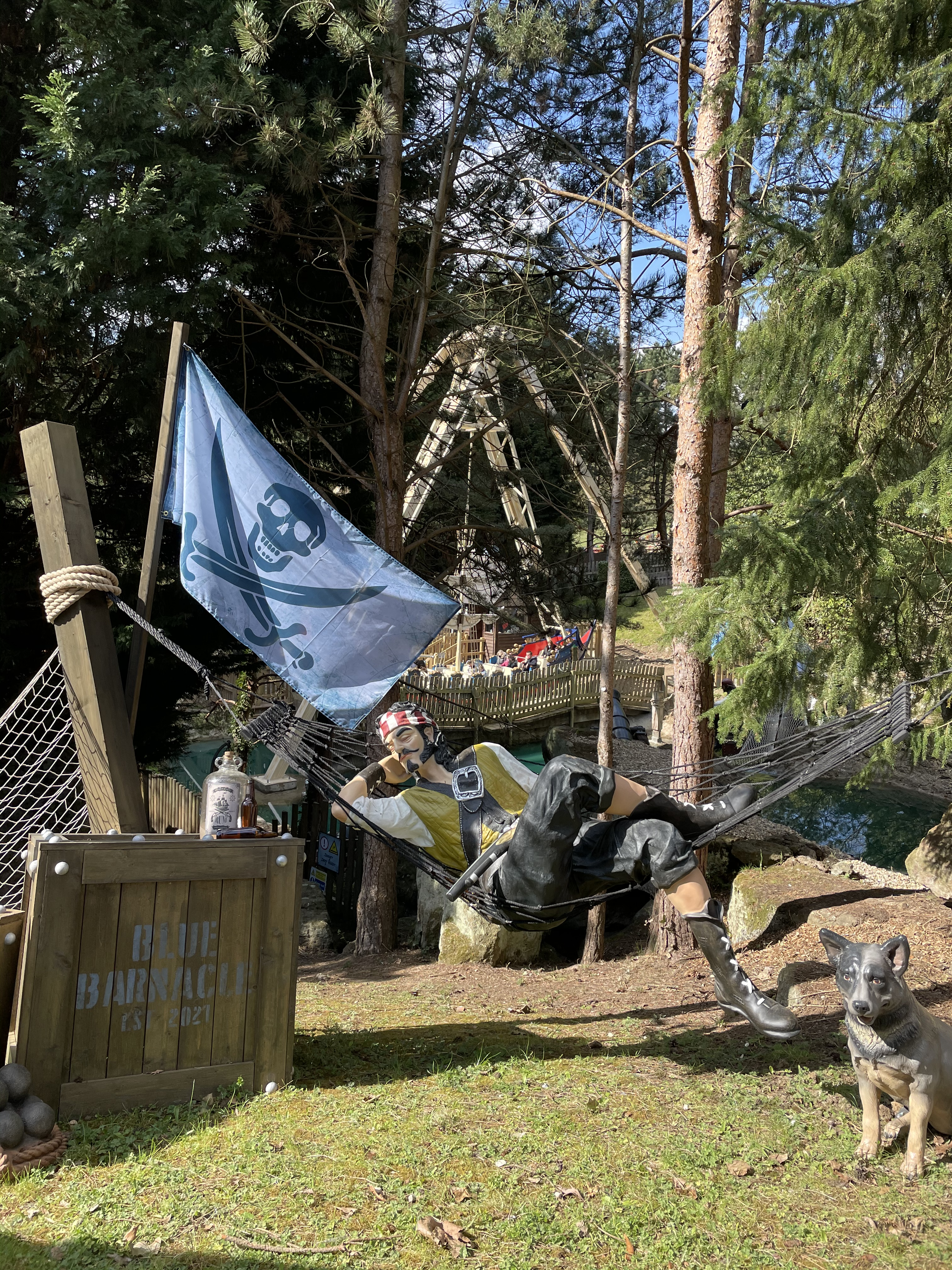
Blue Barnacle's new pirate theming.

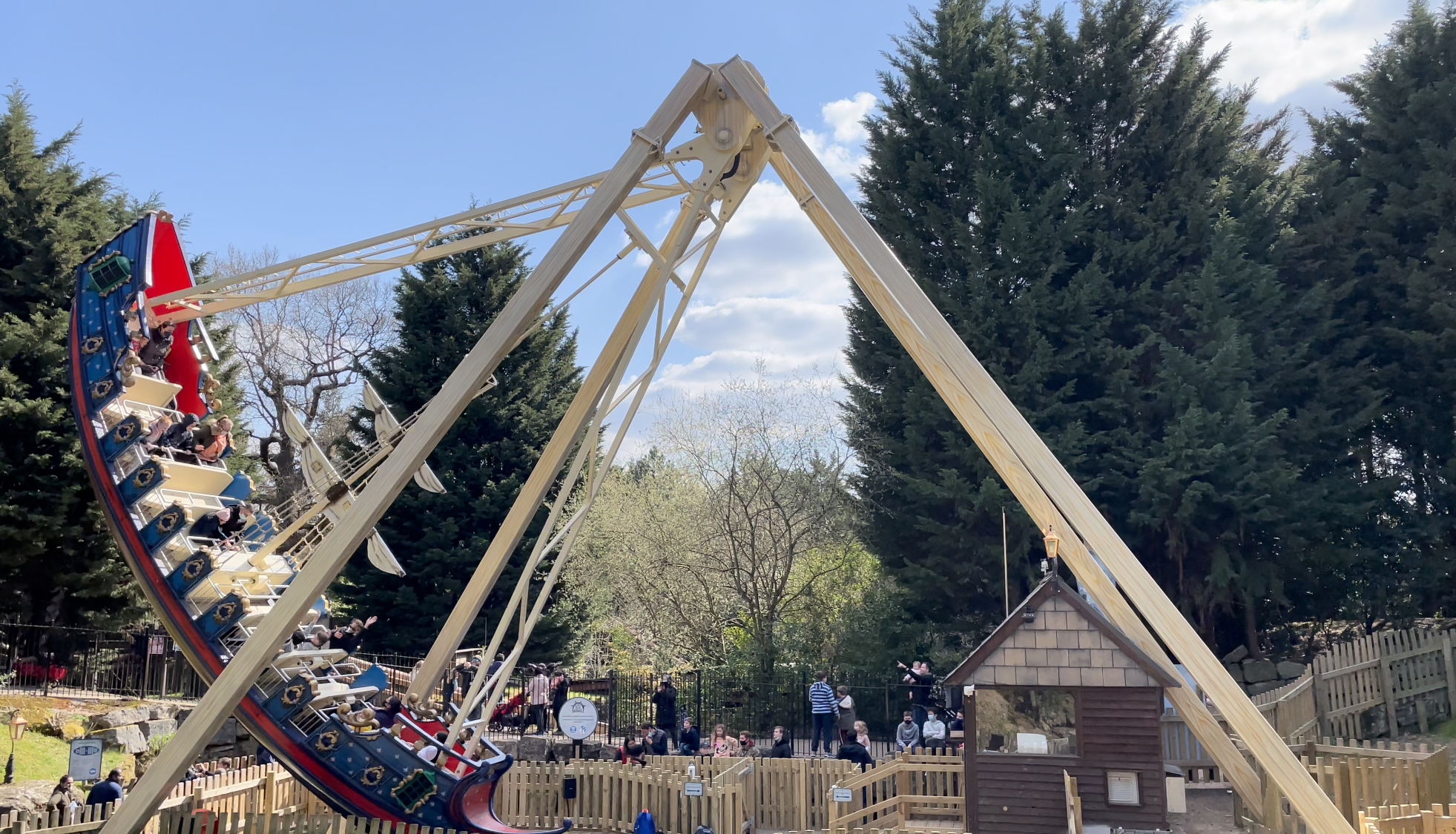
Blue Barnacle's swing.

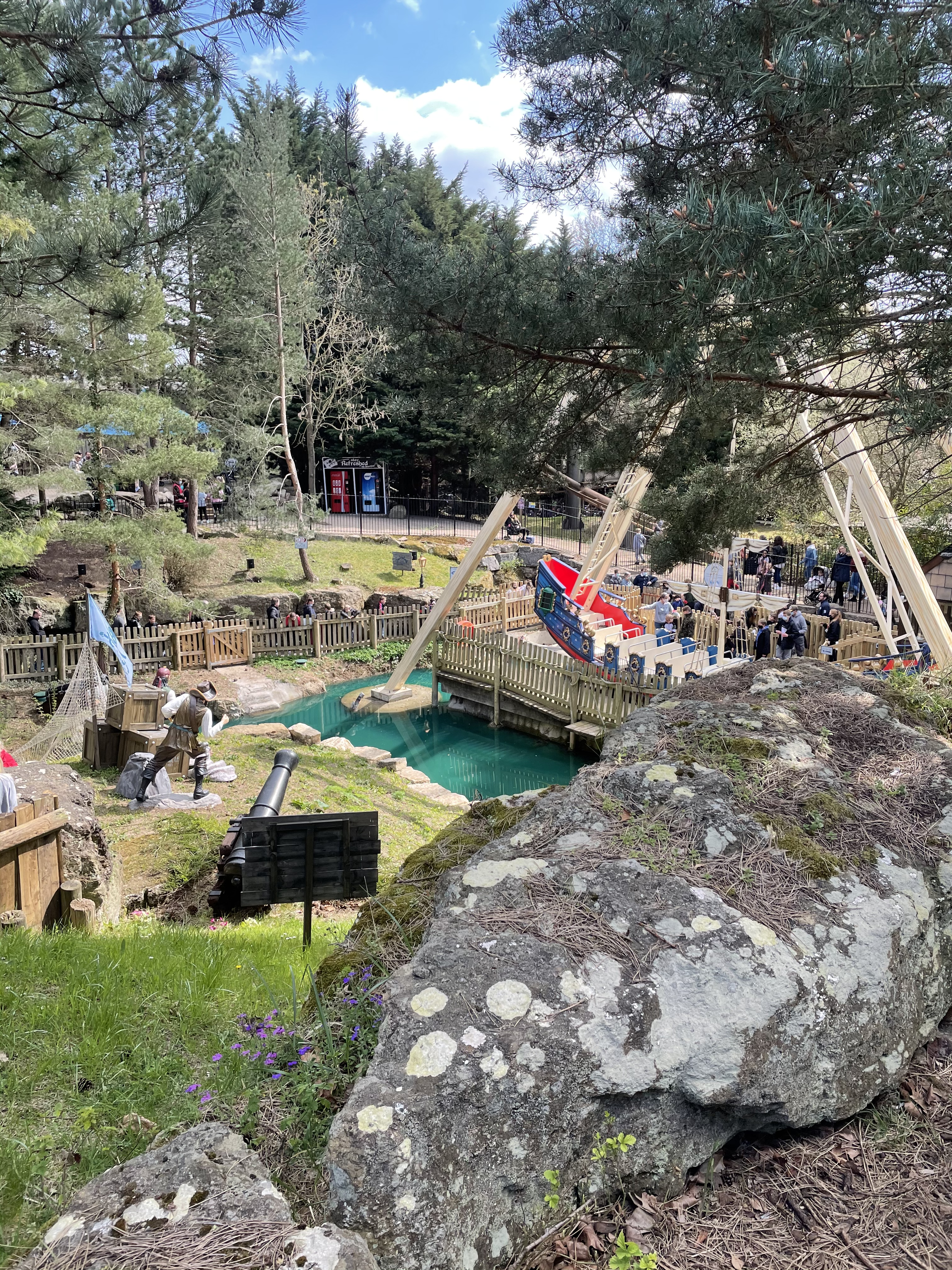
Blue Barnacle's valley.

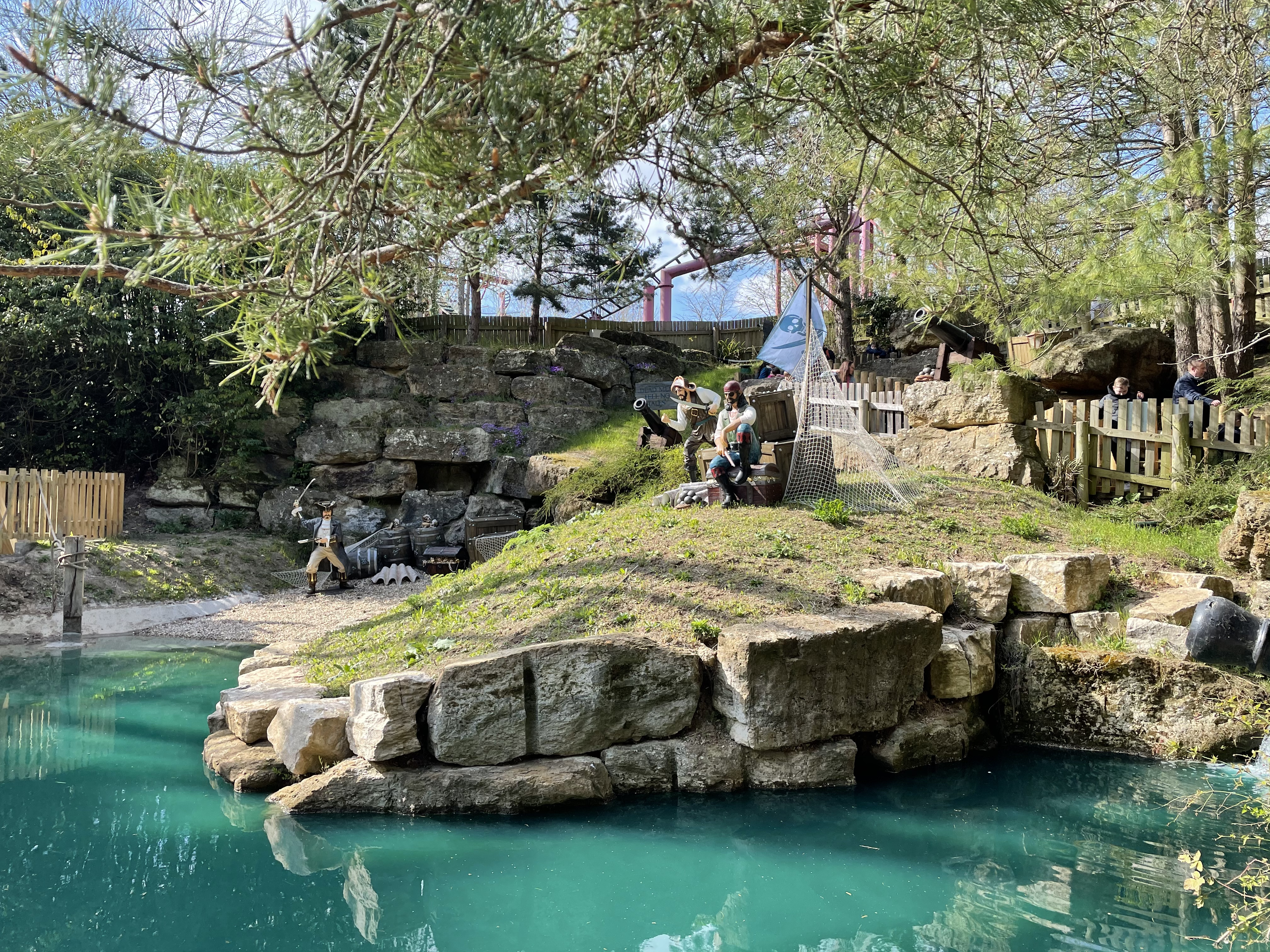
Blue Barnacle's dyed water.

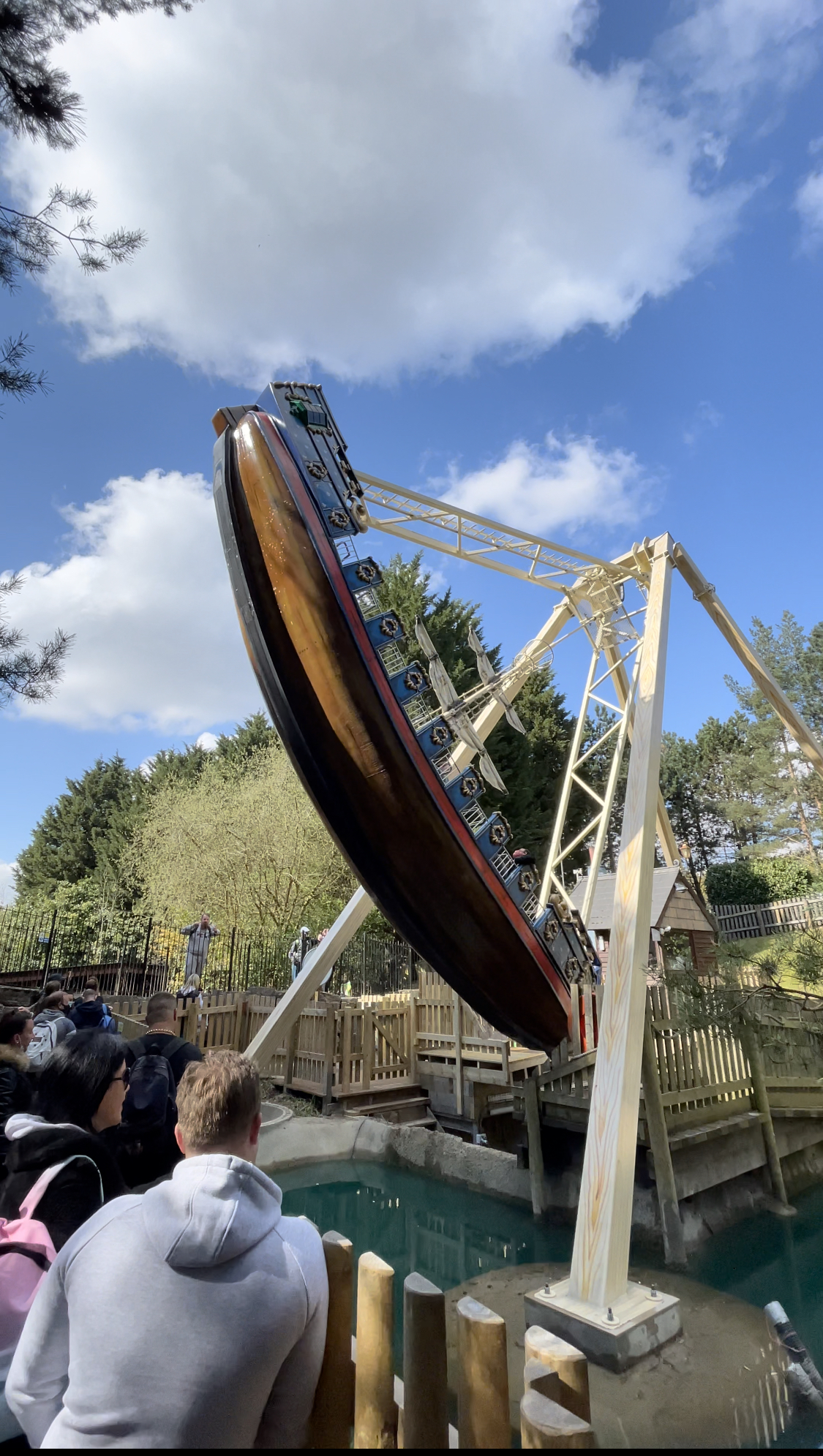
Under the boat, mid swing.

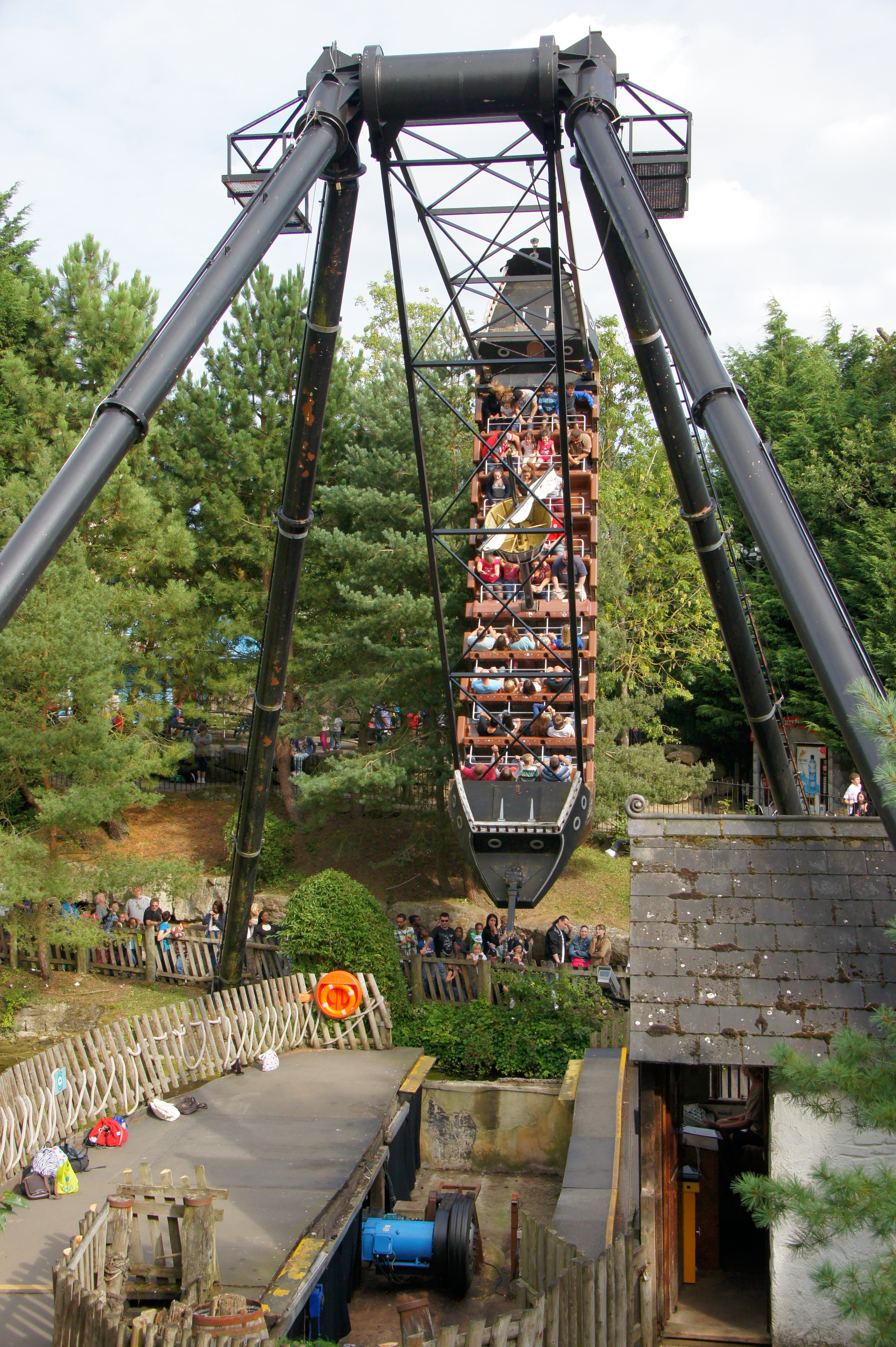
The previous ride, Black Buccaneer.
