= Power Surge (ride) =

High-impact thrill ride

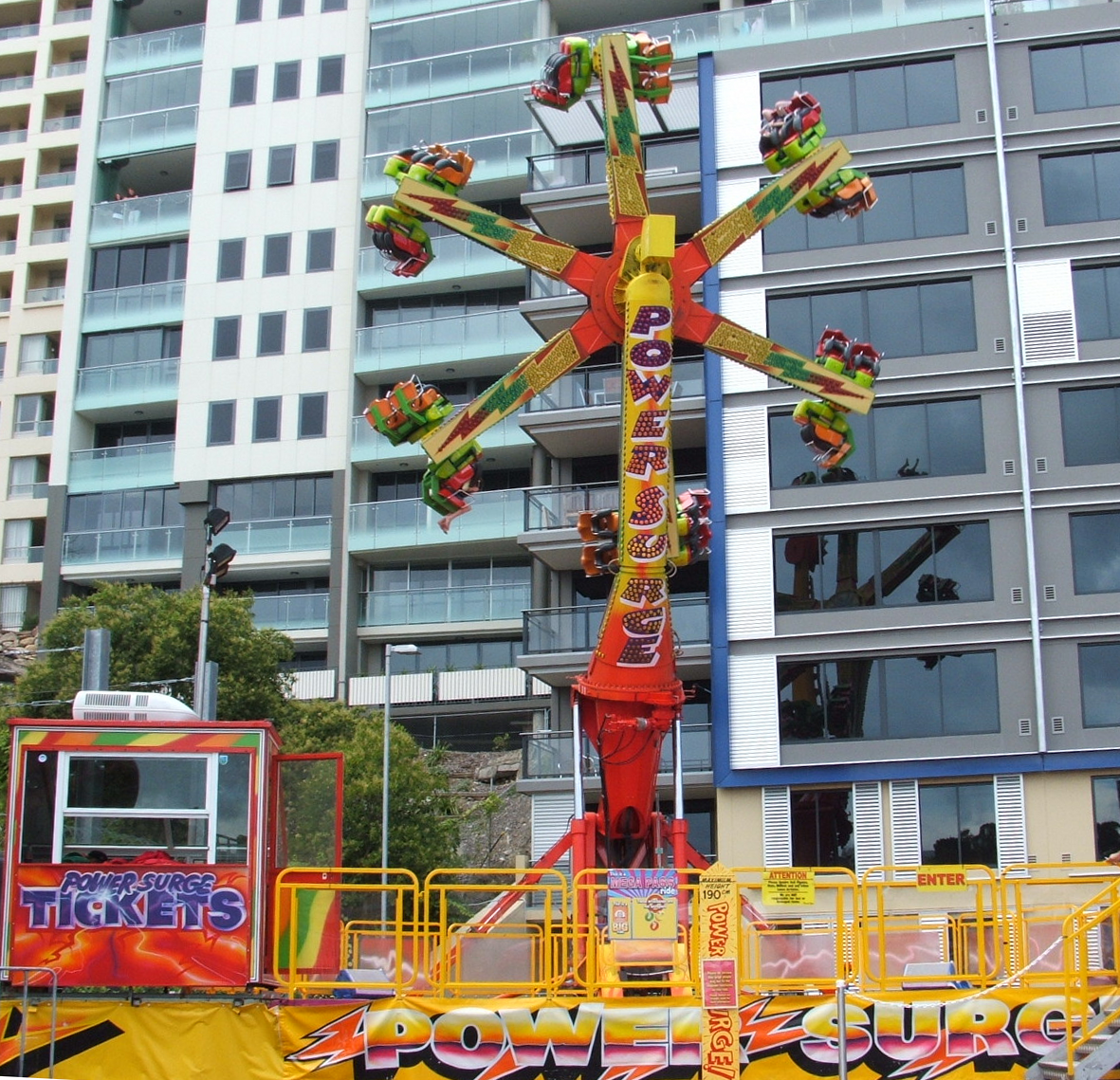
Joylands Travelling Power Surge, in operation

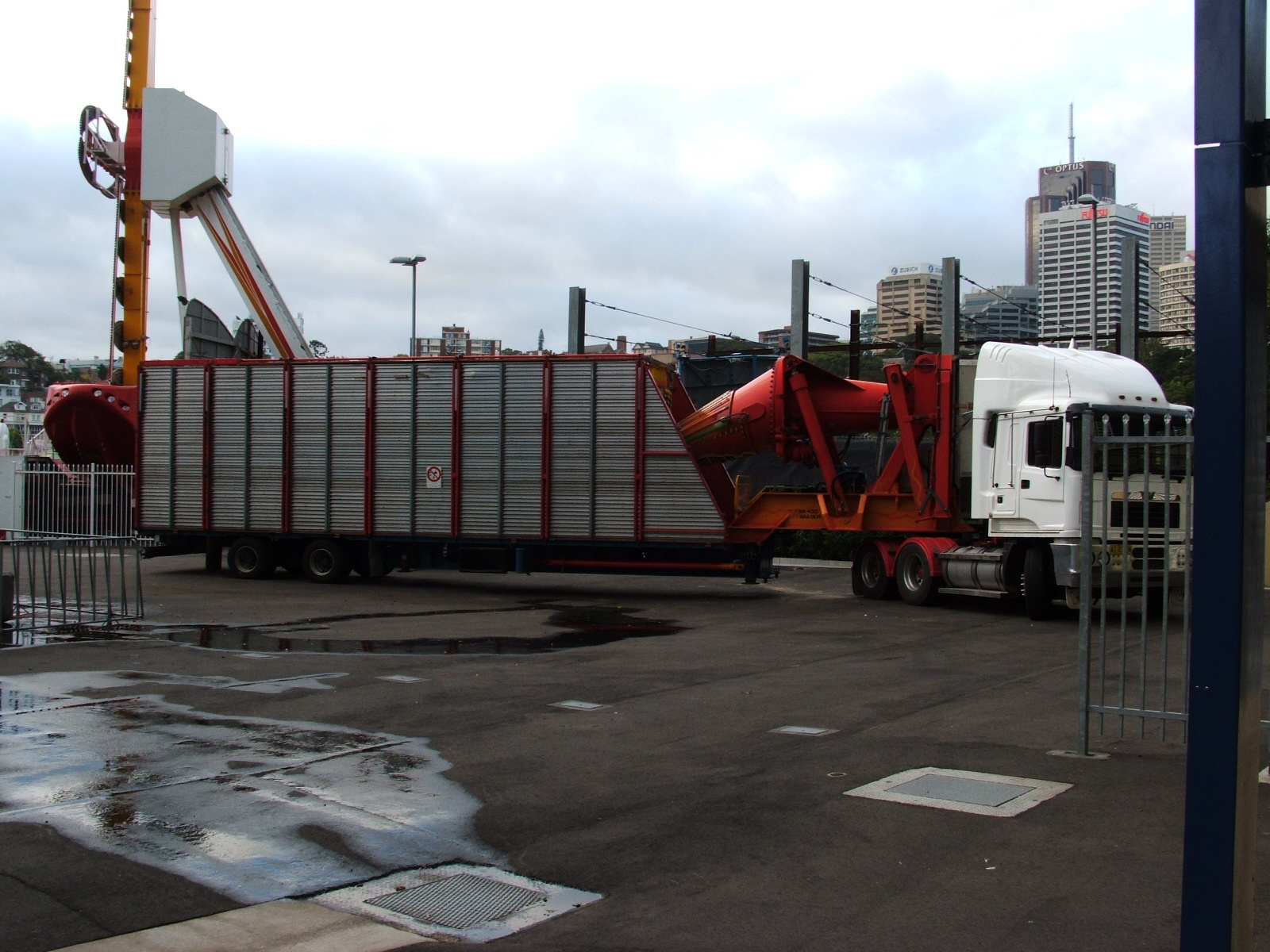
SideShow Amusement’s Power Surge in the transportable position

Power Surge is a high-impact thrill ride designed by Italian ride manufacturer Zamperla. The Power Surge was first operated in 1999, and is produced in both trailer-mounted and park versions. Zamperla recommends that riders be 48 inches (122 cm) or taller; however, 52 inches (132 cm) is more common. The ride's speed is 4 rotations per minute but can reach 12 RPM near the center. The ride can accommodate a maximum of 24 people.

The Power Surge can be found in amusement parks across five continents. The ride is also prevalent in fairs. The park version is fixed at one location, while the trailer version can be moved to different places using a trailer.

== Design and operation ==
Six fixed arms are connected in an asterisk pattern, with two sets of two seats attached at right angles to the arms. The arm assembly is connected to a main arm. Twenty-four riders at a time can be loaded onto the ride. Riders are restrained by an over-the-shoulder harness, with their legs dangling free for excitement.

When this ride is activated, multiple movements occur. The arm assembly rotates, the main arm is raised from the stationary position to an angle of approximately seventy degrees from the horizontal. Once this height is reached, the main arm is capable of rotating, with the combined rotations of both sections causing the seat sets to swing and rotate around the point of attachment. The rotating components can move in both clockwise and anti-clockwise directions, and the different movements can be activated in isolation of each other.

=== Trailer model ===
The Power Surge also has a trailer model used at fairs and other temporary events. This version is collapsible and includes an axle which attaches to a trailer and allows for transportation to multiple locations.

== Incidents ==
In 2016, the Power Surge at Rainbow's End was manually stopped due to passengers spitting at others while on the ride. The riders were removed after failing to comply to warnings given by the operator. Chief Executive Chris Deere assured that the ride was safe for operation after the incident.

At the Hull Fair in 2021, the Power Surge broke down during a cycle. The ride was paused for two minutes before being lowered down to let the riders evacuate.

== Appearances ==
- Australia - A model at Adventure World named Black Widow, one ride at Luna Park Melbourne, and a trailer model operated by SideShow Amusements and used for outdoor festivals and carnivals.
- China - One has been confirmed at Wanda Theme Park in Harbin.
- Colombia - At least one; at Mundo Aventura in Bogotá (renamed Íkaro).
- Finland - The sole Power Surge in Finland can be found at Särkänniemi.
- Indonesia - There are two: One (named Kicir-Kicir) at Dunia Fantasi in Jakarta, and the second (named Vertigo) at Trans Studio Bandung.
- Ireland - One such ride exists at Emerald Park, but it has been temporarily closed since April 2025.
- Malaysia - A Power Surge is located at Skytropolis Indoor Theme Park in Genting Highlands.
- Netherlands - One is owned by Dutch showman Louis Vallentgoed, and is currently being used throughout fairs in the country.
- New Zealand - At least one; a park model at Rainbow's End.
- Pakistan - A Power Surge is operating at MojMela Park in Islamabad.
- Russia - One Power Surge exists at the Dream Island amusement park in Moscow. The ride is named Мельница (Windmill).
- Saudi Arabia - There is only one: at Al-Shallal Theme Park.
- United States of America - The ride can be found at Palace Playland, Frontier City, and Jolly Roger Amusement Park. Rainier Amusements have a Power Surge, which they use while traveling to fairs across the Pacific Northwest. Amusement parks who have removed their Power Surges include Luna Park Coney Island and Beech Bend. The Power Surge at Knoebels is being moved to a new location and is expected to reopen later in the park's 99th season.
