= Pirate ship (ride) =

Amusement ride

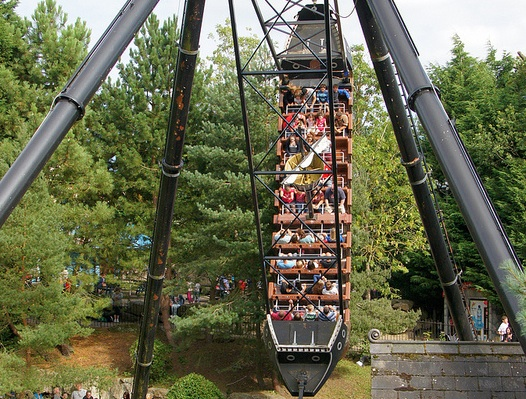
Black Buccaneer at Chessington World of Adventures. Riders at the apex of each swing are typically suspended at around 60 feet (18 metres) above the ground.

A pirate ship is a type of amusement ride consisting of an open, seated gondola (usually in the style of a pirate ship) which swings back and forth, subjecting the rider to various levels of angular momentum. A variant where the riders must pull on ropes to swing the ride is known as a swing boat.

== Height requirements ==
Height requirements for this type of ride vary from park to park. For example, Hersheypark, which has a Huss Pirate Boat, has a height requirement of 42 in (107 cm) or more to ride, while at LaRonde, which also has a Huss Pirate Boat, riders must be 52 in (132 cm) or taller. Huss recommends that the lowest a height requirement should be is 39 in (99 cm), but parks can make it higher if they choose to.

== Manufacturers ==
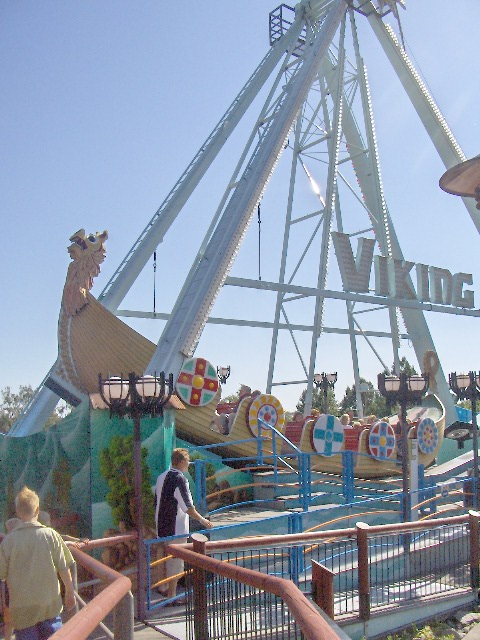
A ride with Viking theme at Linnanmäki

There are a number of Swinging Ship-type rides, and multiple manufacturers.

- Chance Rides' original version is known as the Sea Dragon which are permanent or two trailer portable models. The later version is known as "Pharaoh's Fury" and could be permanent or transported on one 53-foot trailer.
- Fabbri's version is known as the Pirate Ship, and can hold 40 passengers.
- HUSS' version is known as the Pirate Boat, and can hold up to 54 passengers in 9 rows.
- Intamin's version is called Bounty.
- Mulligan's version is known as the Sea Ray.
- SBF Visa's version is known as Pirate and can accommodate 32 passengers.
- SDC makes a version called the Pirate Ship.
- Zamperla's version is known as the Galleon, and has four sizes available, which can hold 33, 42, 54 or 84 passengers.
- Zierer's version is known as the Viking Ship and can accommodate 40 passengers.
- Metallbau Emmeln's version is known as the Schiffsschaukeln and can accommodate 24/40 passengers.
- Helmut Hauser
- DAL Amusements
- Staudenmeyer & Weidmann's version was most iconic from Wicksteed Park's double pirate ship.

== Variants ==
- The Looping Starship, manufactured by Intamin is similar to a pirate ship, except that goes upside down. This gives the rider a feel of zero gravity for a moment as it swings back down while making 360° loops.
- Manufactured by Anton Schwarzkopf, the Shuttle Boat is a pirate ship ride which instead of swinging back and forth rides on a half pipe track. This idea would later be adopted by Zamperla and turned into the Rockin' Tug, featuring a ship that rotates about its own axis also.

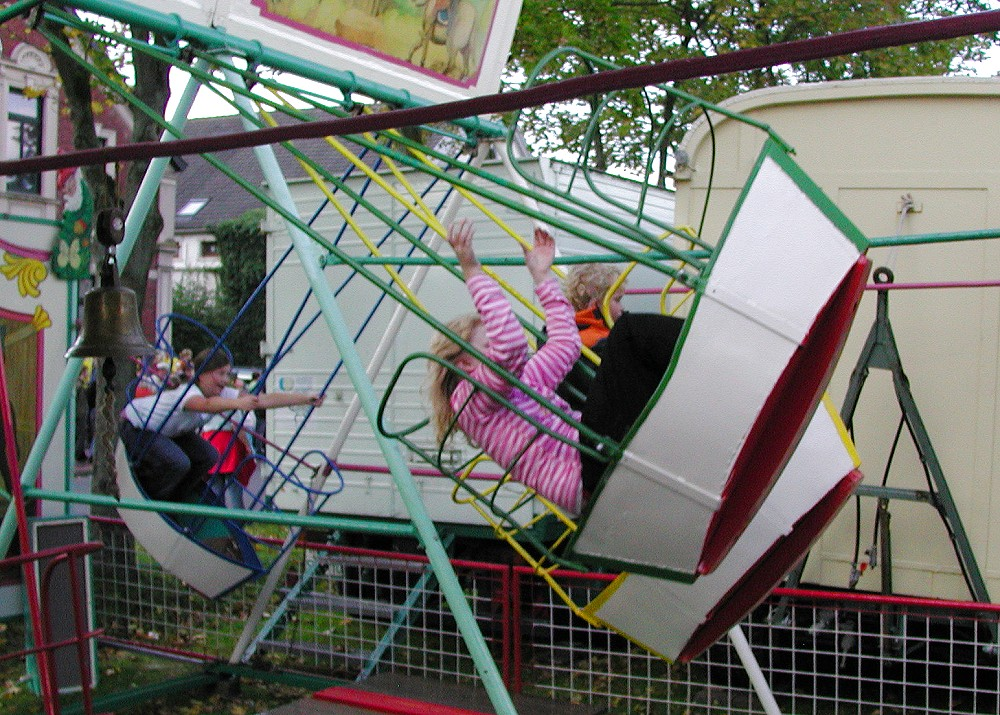
Swingboat on the Roonkarker Mart-fair in northern Germany.

- Some traveling fairs in Europe have pirate ships in which the riders can choose to stand up in cages located at the ends of the ships. These do not go upside down, but do swing to a horizontal position.

The names listed are given by the manufacturers, and individual parks may change the name of the ride itself. Many parks use a Viking Ship theme for their ride. Smaller versions of the ride are often called "Swingboats".

== Installations ==
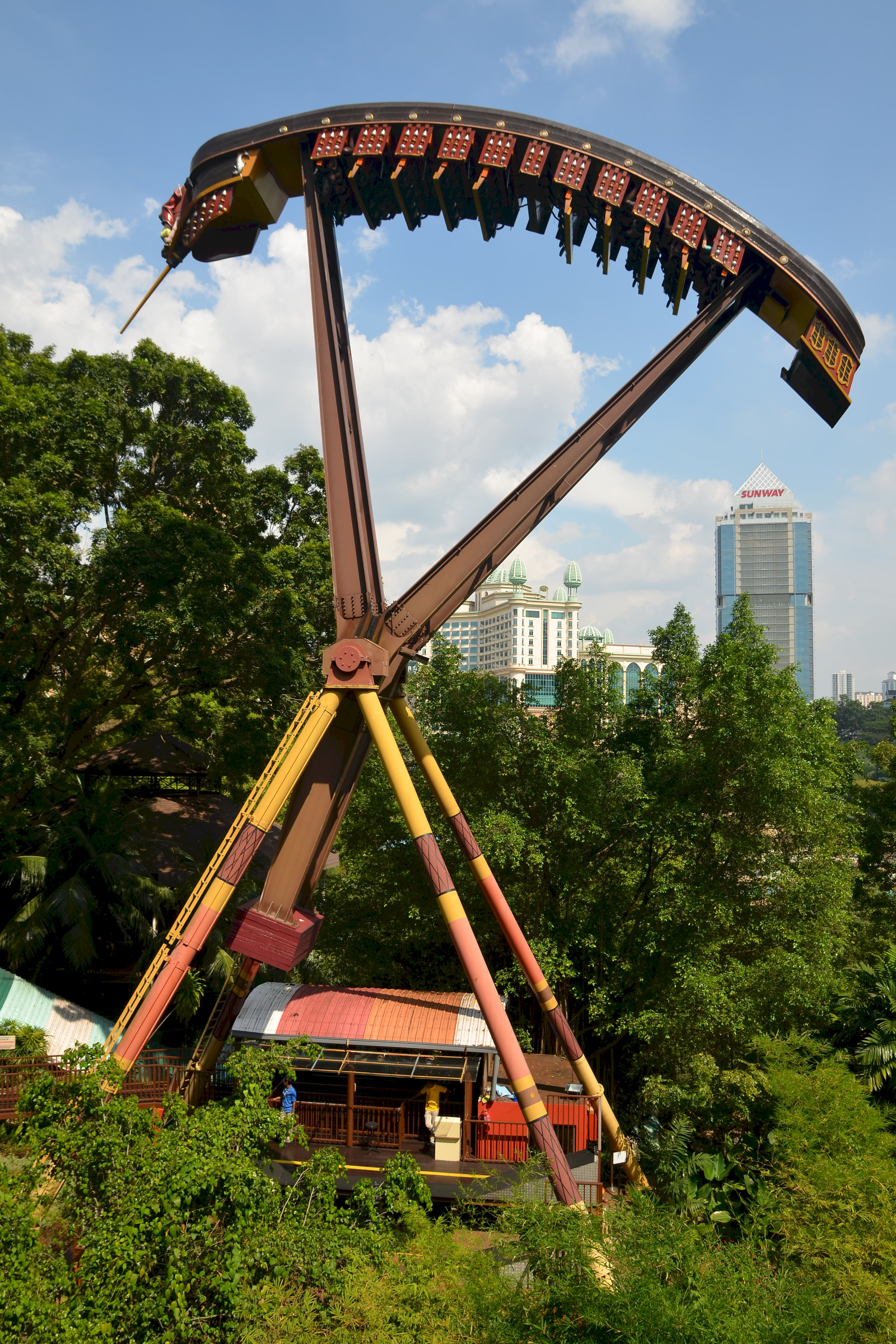
Ride at Sunway Lagoon about to execute a full rotation

- Anchor's Away: Enchanted Kingdom
- Barco Pirata: Pola Park
- Bateau Pirate: La Ronde
- Bateau pirate: Le Pal
- The Battering Ram: Busch Gardens Williamsburg
- Bluebeard's Bounty: Kentucky Kingdom
- Blue Barnacle: Chessington World of Adventures
- The Bounty: Drayton Manor Resort
- Bounty: Heide Park
- Buccaneer: Six Flags Great Adventure, Six Flags Magic Mountain
- Capitán Piraña: Parque de la Costa
- Caribbean Boat: Walygator Parc
- Conquistador: Six Flags Over Texas, Lotte World
- Crazy Galleon: Ocean Park Hong Kong
- Drageskibet: Djurs Sommerland
- Dragon Swing: Knott's Berry Farm
- Flying Cutlass: Lightwater Valley
- Flying Galleon: Galaxyland
- Galion Pirate: Nigloland
- Galleon: Knoebels
- Galleon: Adventureland (Iowa)
- Galleon: Alabama Splash Adventure
- Ghostly Galleon: Adventure Wonderland
- Halve Maen: Efteling
- High Seas: Six Flags America
- The Hook: Lihpao Land
- Jolly Rocker: Legoland Windsor
- Journey to Zanzibar: Columbus Zoo
- Kontiki: PortAventura Park
- Mayflower: Holiday World & Splashin' Safari
- Mr Monkey's Banana Ride: Thorpe Park
- Navío Barbarroja: Isla Mágica
- Ocean Motion: Calaway Park
- Ocean Motion: Cedar Point
- Pacifica Rainbow's End, NZ
- Pharaoh's Fury: Casino Pier, DelGrosso's Amusement Park, Kemah Boardwalk, Wild Adventures, Keansburg Amusement Park (Keansburg, New Jersey), Old Town Kissimmee, Western Fair
- Pirata: Canobie Lake Park
- Pirate: Darien Lake, Lake Winnepesaukah, Playland (Vancouver B.C.), Hersheypark
- Pirate: Kennywood
- Pirate Ship: Adventureland (New York), Lake Compounce, Nicolândia Center Park, Rainbow's End, Santa Cruz Beach Boardwalk, Wonderland Park (Texas), Bottons Pleasure Beach, Skegness, Great Yarmouth Pleasure Beach
- Piratenboot: Bellewaerde
- Piratta: Tibidabo Amusement Park
- Prairie Schooner: Frontier City
- RipTide (formerly Sea Dragon): Morey's Piers
- Rum Runner: Magic Springs and Crystal Falls
- Sand Pirates: Adventuredome
- Sea Dragon: Clementon Park, Dorney Park & Wildwater Kingdom, Funland (Rehoboth Beach, Delaware), Funtown Splashtown USA, Michigan's Adventure, Santa's Village AZoosment Park, Waldameer & Water World, Worlds of Fun, Galveston Island Historic Pleasure Pier, Pacific Park, Castles N' Coasters, Elitch Gardens, Indiana Beach, Niagara Amusement Park & Splash World
- Sea Swell: Lost Island Theme Park
- Smiles Per Galleon: Adventure Island
- The Swinging Viking: Motiongate Dubai
- Tidal Wave: Lagoon Amusement Park
- Viikinkilaiva: Linnanmäki, Särkänniemi
- Viking: Star City
- Viking Fury: Kings Island
- Viking's Rage: Canada's Wonderland
- Vindjammer: Europa-Park
- the dragon swing Gulliver's land

== Former installations ==
- Berserker Kings Dominion
- Black Buccaneer: Chessington World of Adventures
- The Blade: Alton Towers
- "Buccaneer": Geauga Lake
- "Canoa Krakatoa": Six Flags México
- "The Galleon": Camelot Theme Park
- "Galleon": Santa's Village AZoosment Park and Bowcraft Amusement Park
- "H.M.B. Endeavor": California's Great America
- "Pirate": Alabama Adventure
- "Pirate Ship": Astroland, Sea World, The Great Escape, Rainbow's End, NZ
- "Sea Dragon": Morey's Piers (closed because the mast broke off the ride), Ghost Town in the Sky in Maggie Valley, NC and Indiana Beach, DelGrosso's Amusement Park
- "Sea Ray": Martin's Fantasy Island
- "Sturmschiff": Holiday Park
- "The Galleon": Kiddieland Amusement Park
- "Bounty's Revenge": Adventure World, Perth
