= Black Buccaneer =

Amusement ride at Chessington World of Adventures

Coordinates: 51.3475°N 0.3169°W

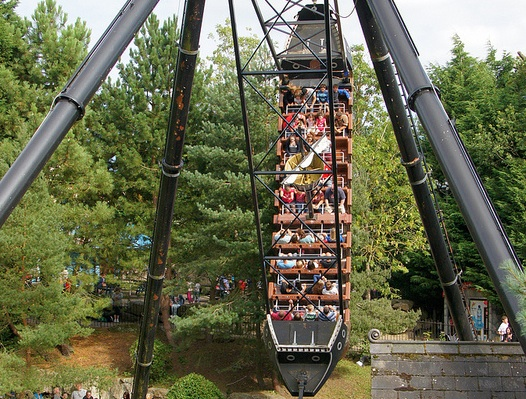
- Previously known as Smugglers' Galleon (1988–1998)

Chessington World of Adventures
- Area: Pirates' Cove
- Status: Closed
- Opening date: 1988
- Closing date: 2018
- Replaced by: Blue Barnacle

Ride statistics
- Attraction type: Pirate ship
- Manufacturer: HUSS Park Attractions
- Theme: Pirates
- Capacity: 950 riders per hour
- Rows: 9
- Riders per row: 5
- Duration: about 3 minutes
- Height restriction: 100 cm (3 ft 3 in)

Black Buccaneer was a swinging pirate ship that operated at Chessington World of Adventures Resort in southwest London, England from 1988 to 2018 in the Pirates' Cove section of the park. After operating for 30 years, the ride has been replaced by Blue Barnacle in 2021.

== History ==
Black Buccaneer was originally manufactured by Huss Rides in 1984, however opened at the park as Smugglers Galleon in 1988.

In 1998, the ride was rebranded as 'Black Buccaneer' and repainted black.

The ride received a soundtrack in late 2013.

For the start of the 2017 season, the ride received a new coat of paint and a single rider queue.

From the start of the 2018 season, the attraction sat dismantled until being rebuilt in July.

After last operating during the 2018 Winters Tail event, the park announced at the start of the 2019 season that the ride would open late, alongside three other rides. Whilst the others later opened, Black Buccaneer remained dismantled and the park eventually confirmed that the ride would not operate for the 2019 season.

After much speculation, it was announced the ride would be replaced for 2020 with a new ship called Blue Barnacle. Work, however, stopped due to the COVID-19 pandemic, delaying construction completion to April 2021.

== Description ==
The ride was themed as a pirate ship and sat 45 riders per cycle in 9 rows of 5, before swinging back and forth at heights of up to 60 feet. It was painted black (hence the name) before later being changed to silver to expose any cracks.

Restrictions

You had to be a minimum of 1m tall to ride. Anyone under 1.3 meters had to be accompanied by an adult. In the 2016 season, a rule was added in which people 16 years or older had to be seated on the edges of each row, which meant anyone under 16 had to be seated in the middle. This saw queue times increase.

== Gallery ==
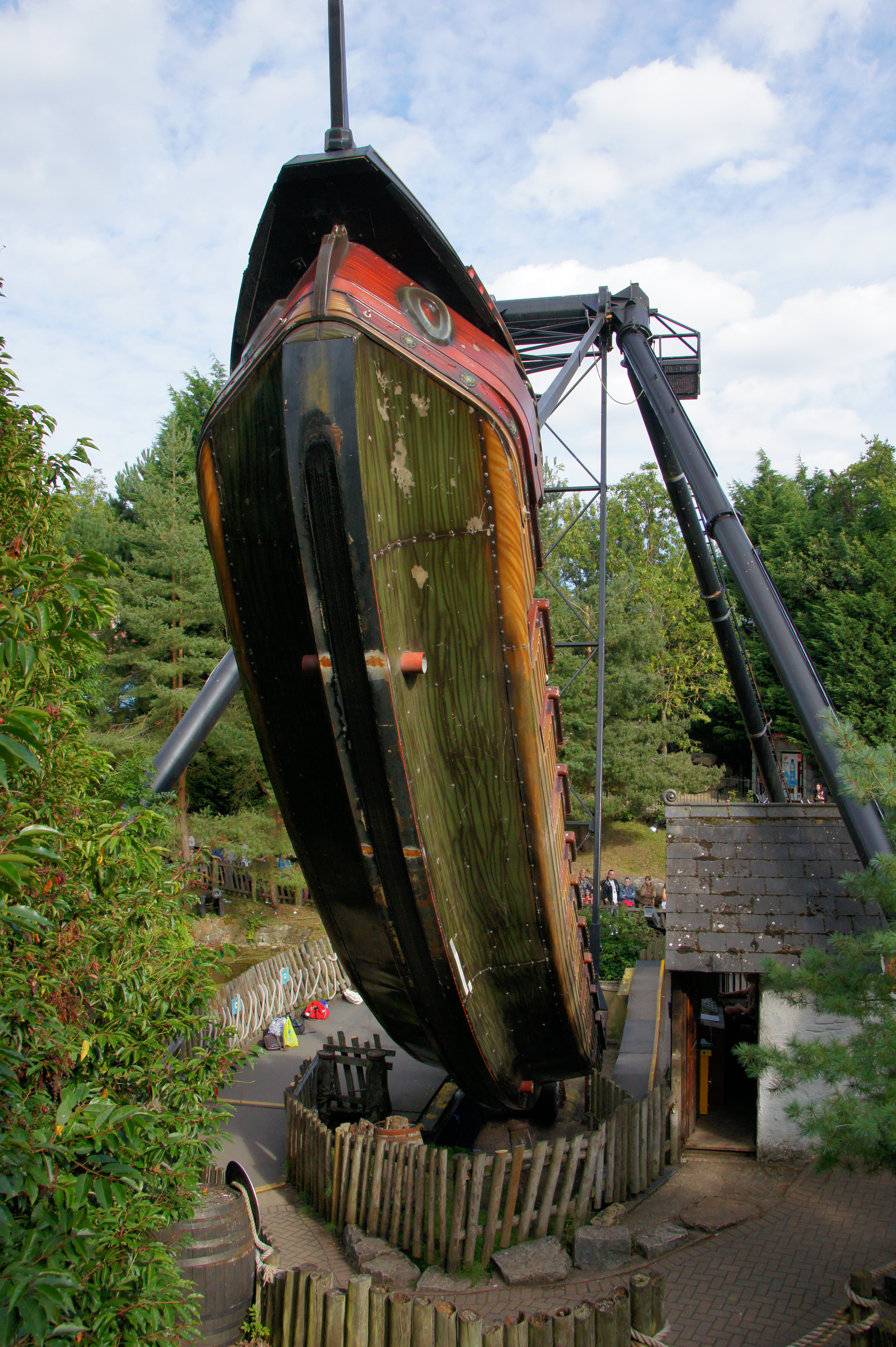
The ride in motion

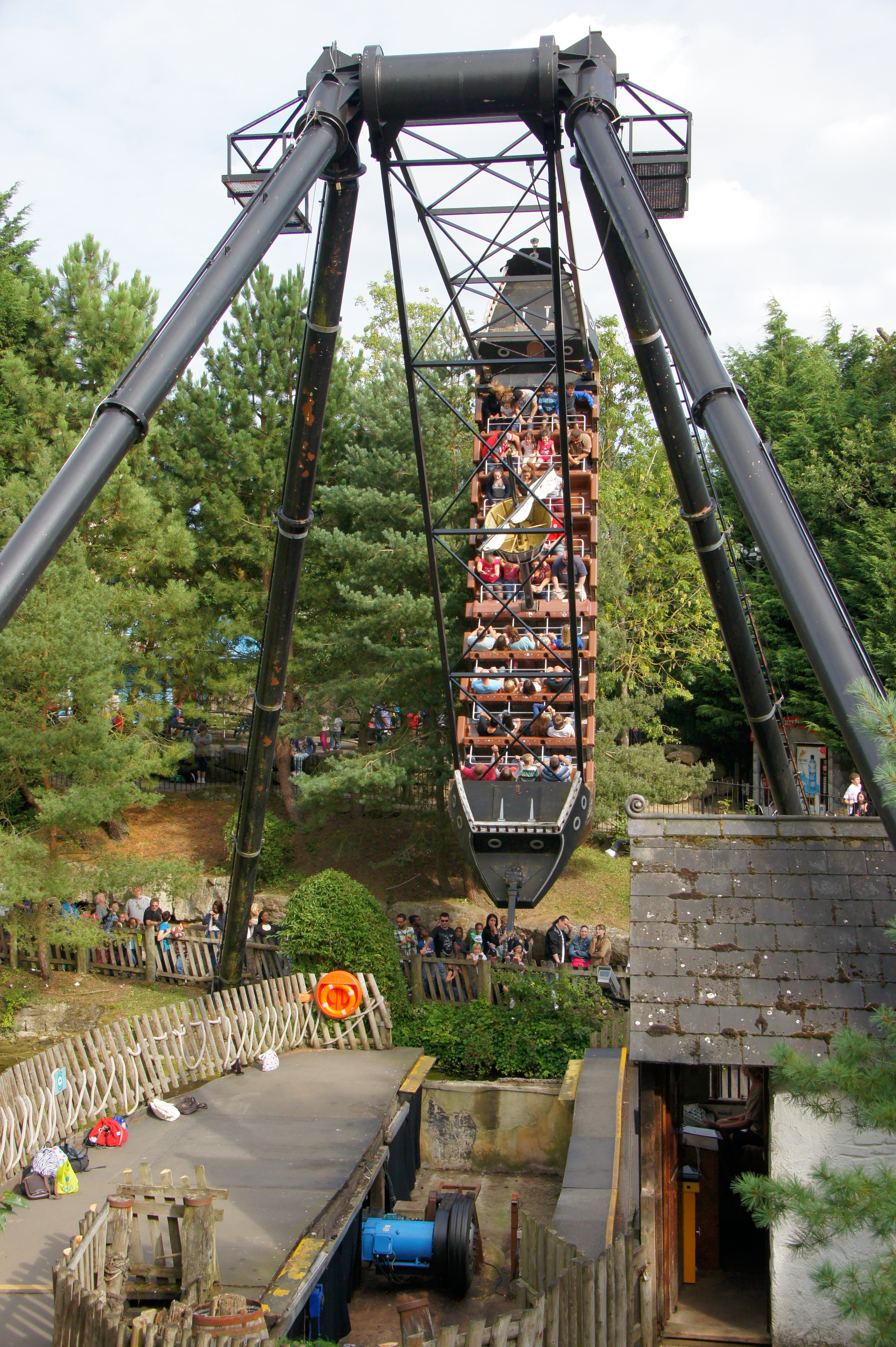
Full view
