= Swing boat =

Amusement park ride

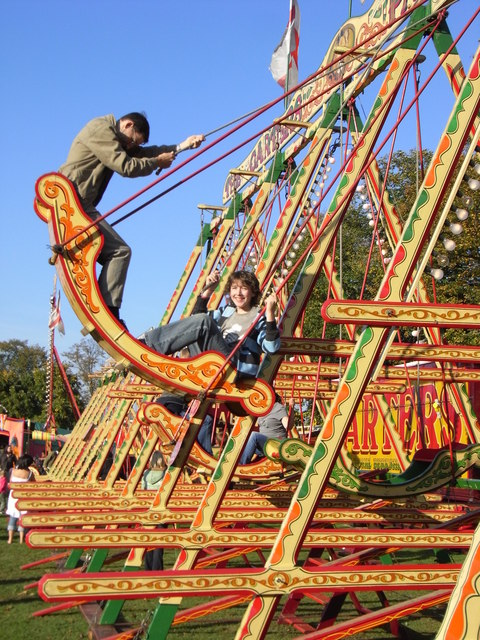
People on a swing boat at Carter's Steam Fair, Prospect Park

A swing boat, colloquially known as a "shuggy boat" in Northern England, is a fairground ride in which pairs of riders pull ropes to swing back and forth. A similar ride called a pirate ship swings in a similar motion but without the rider pulling on ropes.

Swing boats were one of the earliest fairground rides, common in the Victorian era. The Beamish open-air museum features an example from the 1830s, named "Skylark". The boats were originally powered by hand, but steam-driven versions began to be introduced in the 1880s.

Examples of Victorian-style manually operated swing boats are still popular and are generally seen in traveling "period" fairs.

== See also ==
- Pirate ship (ride)
