= Rainbow's End (theme park) =

Amusement park in Auckland, New Zealand

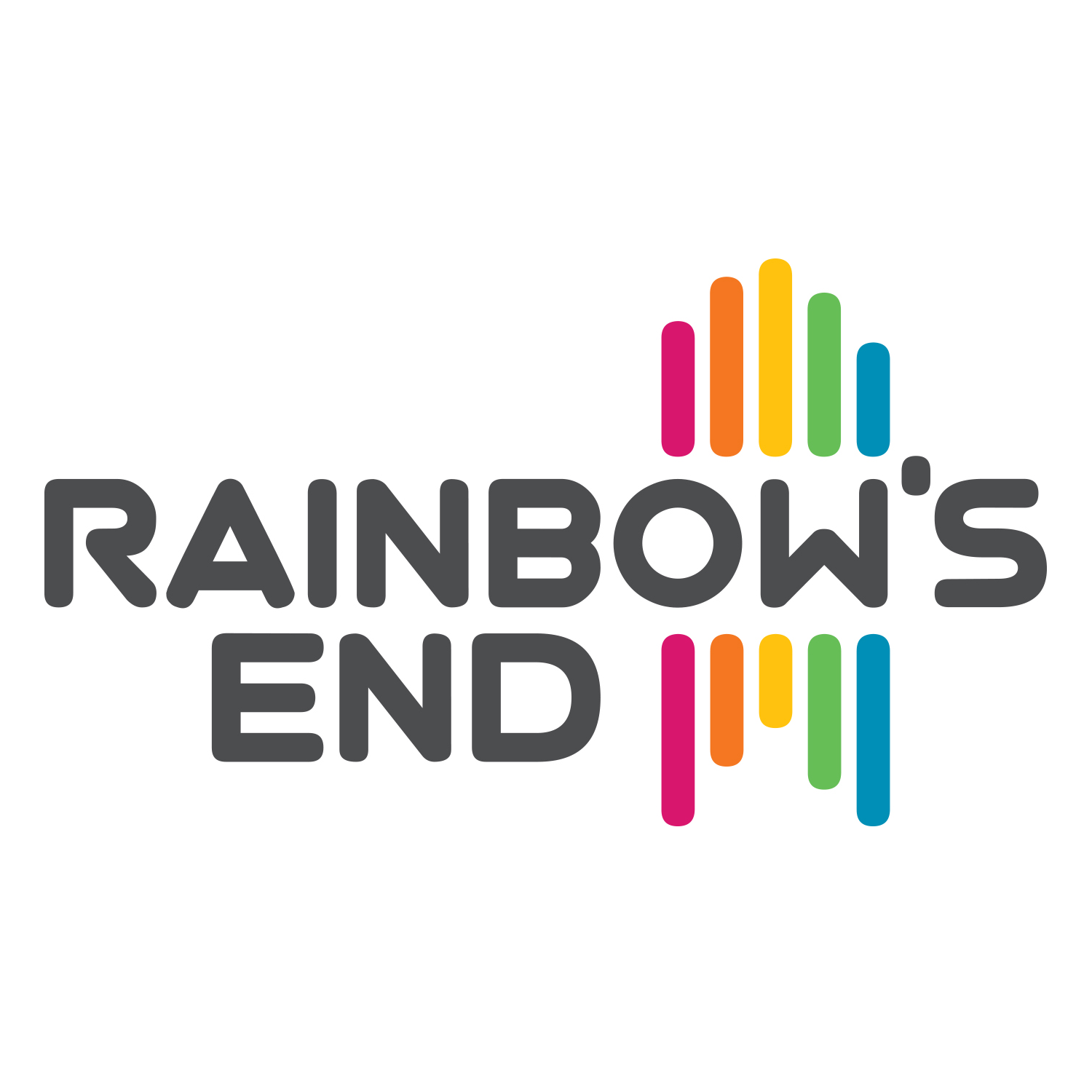
- Logo since 2014

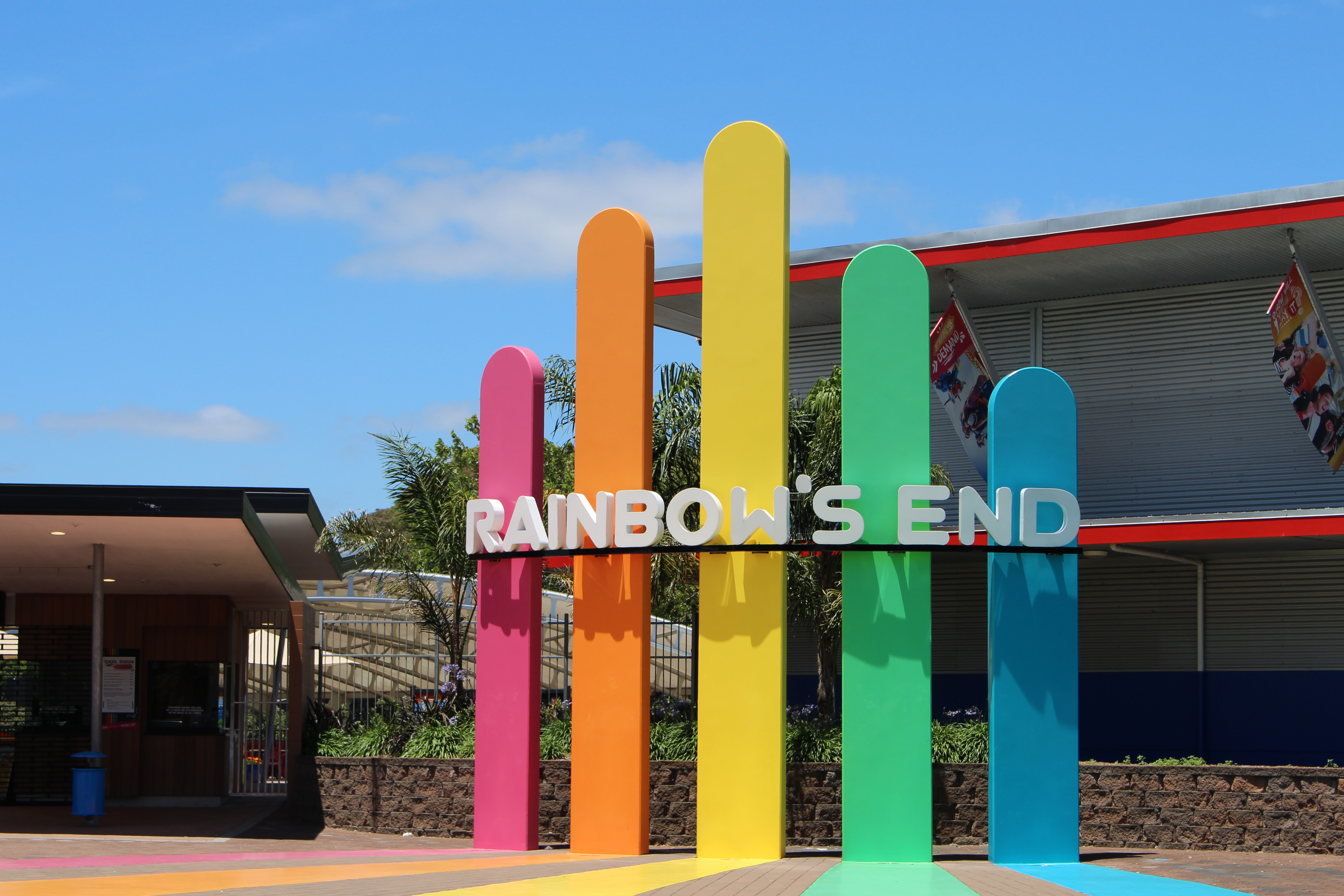
- Park entrance
- Interactive map of Rainbow's End
- Location: Manukau, New Zealand
- Coordinates: 36.994°S 174.884°E
- Opened: December 1982; 43 years ago
- Owner: Rainbow's End Theme Park Limited (subsidiary of Rangatira Limited)
- Slogan: Fun On Demand
- Operating season: Year-round (except Christmas Day)
- Area: 9.3 ha (23 acres)

Attractions
- Total: 21
- Water rides: 2
- Website: www.rainbowsend.co.nz

Rainbow's End is a theme park in Manukau, Auckland, New Zealand. Rainbow's End has an area of 9.3 hectares (23 acres) and includes the main theme park and also Kidz Kingdom, a family entertainment centre for children 8 years and under. The park, owned by Rainbows End Theme Park Limited, a subsidiary of Rangatira Limited, is New Zealand's largest theme park and currently employs up to 300 staff.

== History ==
Opened in 1982 on the site of a former skate park, the park extended its lease in 2010 for another 24 years after five years of discussions with the Manukau City Council. The extension was conditional on reducing its size by 0.4 ha to 9.3 ha to allow for new construction at the nearby law courts (being compensated for the land lost). The agreement with the Council committed the company to re-invest $3 million every three years into new rides or upgrades.

Ride History
1982 – Park opens with the Bumper Boats, Mini Golf, Can Am Cars, Mirage Cars and video games
1983 – Cinema 180, Pirate Ship, Maze and the indoor play area open
1984 – Log Flume and Dodgems open
1985 – Kiddies Cars and Space Shuttle Zim Zam Zoo Playground open
1986 – Coca-Cola Corkscrew Coaster opens
1992 – Motion Master opens
1993 – Family Karts replace Mirage Cars
1995 – Gold Rush opens
1996 – Car wash Convoy opens
1997 – Castle Land open with Dragons Flight roller coaster and Carousel (known as Cadbury Land Castle until 2012)
1998 – Log Flume set on fire by arsonists in June. Ride reconstructed and rethemed before reopening as the Enchanted Forest Log Flume
2001 – Fear Fall opens
2004 – Power Surge and Jumpin' Star open
2008 – Ferris wheel inside the Cadbury Land castle is closed after the death of a maintenance worker after they got caught in the ride mechanism
2009 – Invader opens
2012 – Dragons Flight is removed from Castle Land. Castle Land closes and the new Kidz Kingdom outdoor covered area is opened on Boxing Day 2012 with 3 new rides: The Choco Express, Surf n Swing and Magic Bikes. Happy Feet replaces Journey to the Centre of the Earth in the Motion Master
2013 – The indoor section of Kidz Kingdom opens which includes The Fortress of Fun, Enzo's Country Raceway and the Small Talk Cafe as well as interactive activities for smaller children
2014 – Stratosfear, a Discovery Revolution ride from Zamperla, opened on 17 April. Unlike most Discoverys this version sends riders upside down, one of only 4 of them in the world that do so
2015 – After 32 years of operation, Rainbow's End closed and demolished their Cinema 180. This was the last of its kind in the world. The park announced on their website that they will be building a new attraction around this area in the future
2016 – The Dodgems ride is completely refurbished including all new cars and 1950s drive in theme
2017 – AA Driver's Town opens
August 2017 – Original Pirate ship closes after 34 years of operation.
2019 – Rainbow's End Playlab opens (this replaces the Futuretainment Arcade)
2019 – Motion Master closed to be replaced with Spectra
2020 – Spectra, the biggest immersive theatre experience in the Southern Hemisphere, opens July
2021 – AA Driver's Town closed to make way for City Strike Laser Tag
2021 – City Strike Laser Tag opened in December 2021
2022 – Enchanted Forest Log Flume upgraded with a new storyline, featuring new characters set in 4 new lands: The Trees, Unicorn Meadow, Dragon Dale and The Golden Glenn.
2024 – The Dodgems were Re-Themed to a Deep sea Theme.
2025 - A new Huss Rides Pirate Ship named Pacifica opened in October.

== Current rides and attractions ==
- Stratosfear – Billed as the scariest ride yet, sends 30 riders spinning through the air and even upside down. This was one of only four of its kind in the world on opening day.
- The Invader – The Invader is a Disk'O Coaster from Zamperla in Italy which utilises gravity to move across a 15-metre-high (49 ft), 80-metre-long (260 ft) w-shaped track.
- Power Surge – The Power Surge is a thrill ride that can spin on both a horizontal and a vertical axis.
- Dodgems – Dodgem cars with Deep sea theme.
- Kidz Kingdom – An area in the park catered for children 8 years and under. The outdoor covered area has seven rides including the Choco Express, Carousel and Jumpin' Star. The indoor area includes the Fortress of Fun (play structure), Enzo's Country Raceway (cars) and the Small Talk Cafe as well as interactive activities for smaller children.
- Corkscrew roller coaster – A roller coaster manufactured by Arrow Dynamics. It is the only one of its kind in the country. It is over 90 feet (27 m) high, and contains three inversions, a vertical loop and a double corkscrew.
- Goldrush – A mine themed roller coaster ride consisting of short drops and sharp corners. This ride was custom built by Rainbow's End engineers
- Log Flume – The Enchanted Forest Log Flume has minor drops and a larger drop at the end.
- Fear Fall – An 18-story Intamin drop ride. Riders are lifted up the tower and dropped at speeds reaching 80 km/h, with the ride vehicle being stopped by magnetic braking.
- Family Karts/Scorpion Karts – A go-kart attraction with two levels of suitability: one for families with a passenger seat and one for slightly older guests.
- Bumper Boats – Guests are seated in Bumper Boats and are free to drive around 'bumping' into other guests.
- Crazy Sideshows – A range of carnival games open on weekends and holidays.
- Centre Stage – A large covered stage and eating area with shows on the weekends and the holidays.
- Rainbow Playlab – A large up-charge arcade/gaming area, with arcades, virtual reality, E-Sports gaming and escape rooms.
- Spectra XD Dark Ride – A theatre experience with several dimensions of special effects
- City Strike Laser tag – A post-apocalyptic themed laser-tag attraction
- Pacifica – A Huss Rides Pirate Ship Attraction

== Awards ==
Rainbow's End and Kidz Kingdom have won a number of awards.

- 2013 – Awarded two Brass Ring 2012 Awards for "Best Employee Reward and Recognition Program" and "Best Innovation in a Training Program" for a facility with annual attendance less than 1 million at the IAAPA ceremony in Orlando, Florida
- 2014 – Winner of the Marketing Excellence Award at the Westpac Auckland Business Awards 2014 - South
- 2015 – Winner of the 'Best of the Best Marketing Award' 2014 at the Westpac Auckland Business Awards
- 2015 – Awarded a 2015 TripAdvisor Certificate of Excellence
- 2015 – Finalist in the Tourism Industry Awards 2015 in the categories of "Visitor Experience" and "Business Excellence"
- 2015 – Kidz Kingdom was the winner of the "Top Family Entertainment Centre of the World Award 2015" at the IAAPA award ceremony in Florida
- 2015 – Awarded the "Auckland Youth Employer of the Year" award as part of the Auckland Council Youth Employer Pledge Scheme
- 2016 – Awarded a 2016 TripAdvisor Certificate of Excellence
- 2016 – Placed 5th in the TripAdvisor list of the Top 10 Amusement Parks & Water Parks in the South Pacific
- 2016 – Winner of the "Local Youth Employer Award", "Innovative Youth Employer Award" and "Jobfest Exhibitor Award" at the 2016 Young At Heart Awards administered by Auckland Tourism, Events and Economic Development
- 2017 – Awarded a 2017 TripAdvisor Certificate of Excellence
- 2017 – Awarded the Qualmark Gold Sustainable Tourism Business Award

== Accidents and incidents ==
- On 10 February 1990, Thomas Wayne Hemi, 19 years old, fell from a bungy jump at the park. The jump master Jason John Collett, failed to secure the bungy cord to Hemi's feet. Hemi initially survived the fall, but subsequently died from his injuries. Collett was later found guilty of manslaughter after evidence was presented that both men had smoked cannabis prior to the jump. He was granted mercy—on recommendation from the jury—and was sentenced to 200 hours of community service.
- On 21 June 1998, a fire struck the Log Flume ride. Over 75% of the ride was destroyed and two offenders were arrested. After that, the Log Flume was reconstructed and re-themed.
- On 2 February 2008, Michael Ross Stuart, a 21-year-old park worker died while carrying out maintenance work on a ferris wheel, located in the Cadbury Land Dream Castle attraction. The worker became trapped between one of the carriages and the frame of the ride, and had to be cut free by firefighters, but died at the scene. The accident, which occurred before the park opened for the day, caused the park to be closed down for two days because of "unforeseen circumstances". Stuart had been working at the park since 2005.
- On 10 November 2012, a woman got trapped on the Log Flume ride. Firefighters were called to the theme park to free the woman and had to cut up parts of the ride to get her free. A fire service spokesman said it was unclear how the woman became trapped. She was taken by ambulance to Middlemore Hospital with minor injuries.
- On 7 January 2015, twenty-eight people were suspended mid-air on the Corkscrew roller coaster for over 20 minutes. The ride was stopped as a precaution because the engine had overheated. All riders were evacuated safely and the coaster was closed whilst engineers investigated the fault.
- On 28 November 2016, an employee manually shut down the Power Surge ride mid-cycle, leaving twelve riders dangling upside down in their harnesses. Rainbow's End management claimed in social media posts that the ride was shut down due to children continuing to spit after ignoring previous warnings from employees.
- On 18 November 2018, fifteen people were evacuated off the Corkscrew roller coaster after it stopped at its highest point. The ride was restarted again within 45 minutes after the guests were evacuated.

== Gallery ==
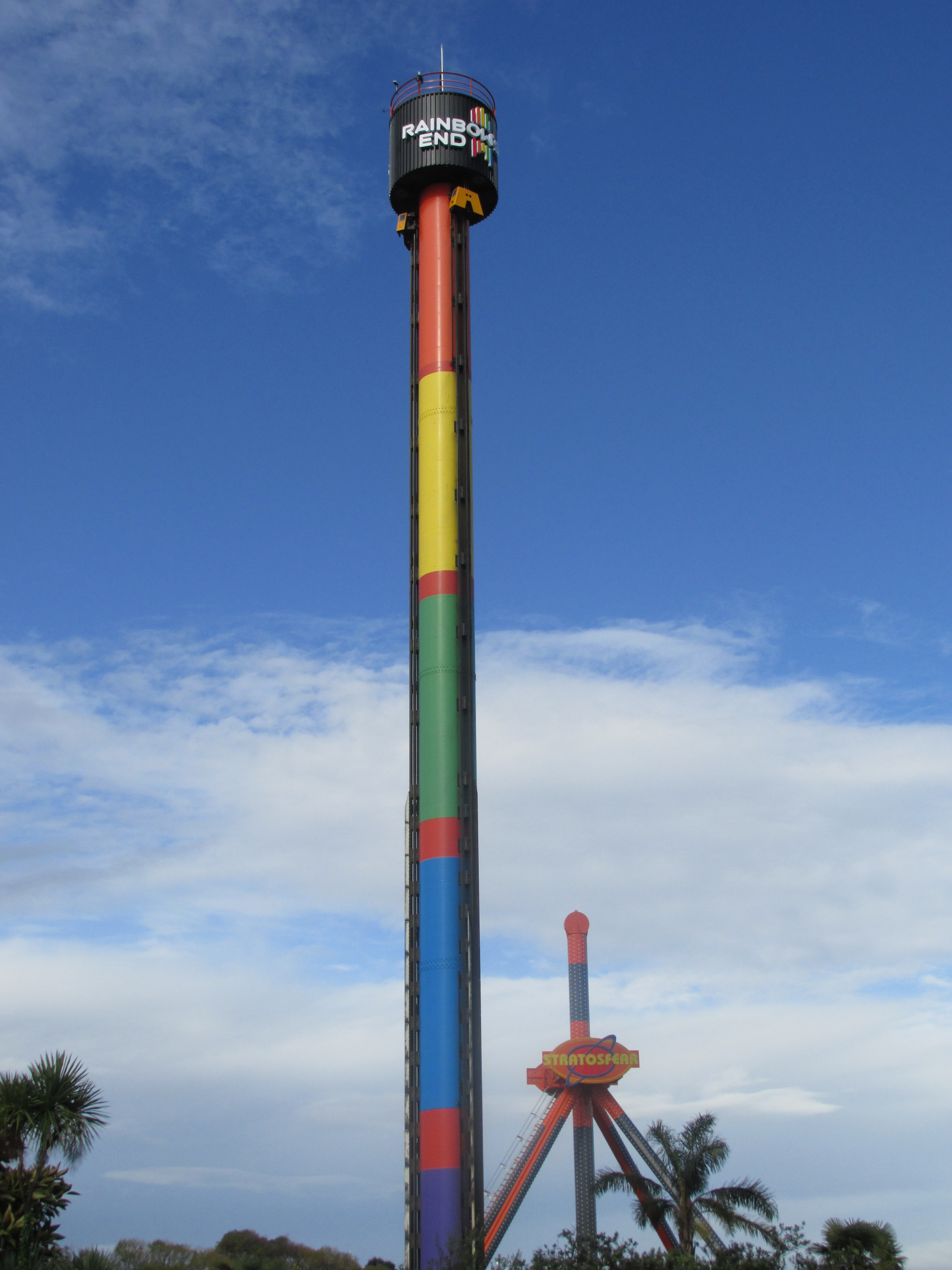
Fearfall

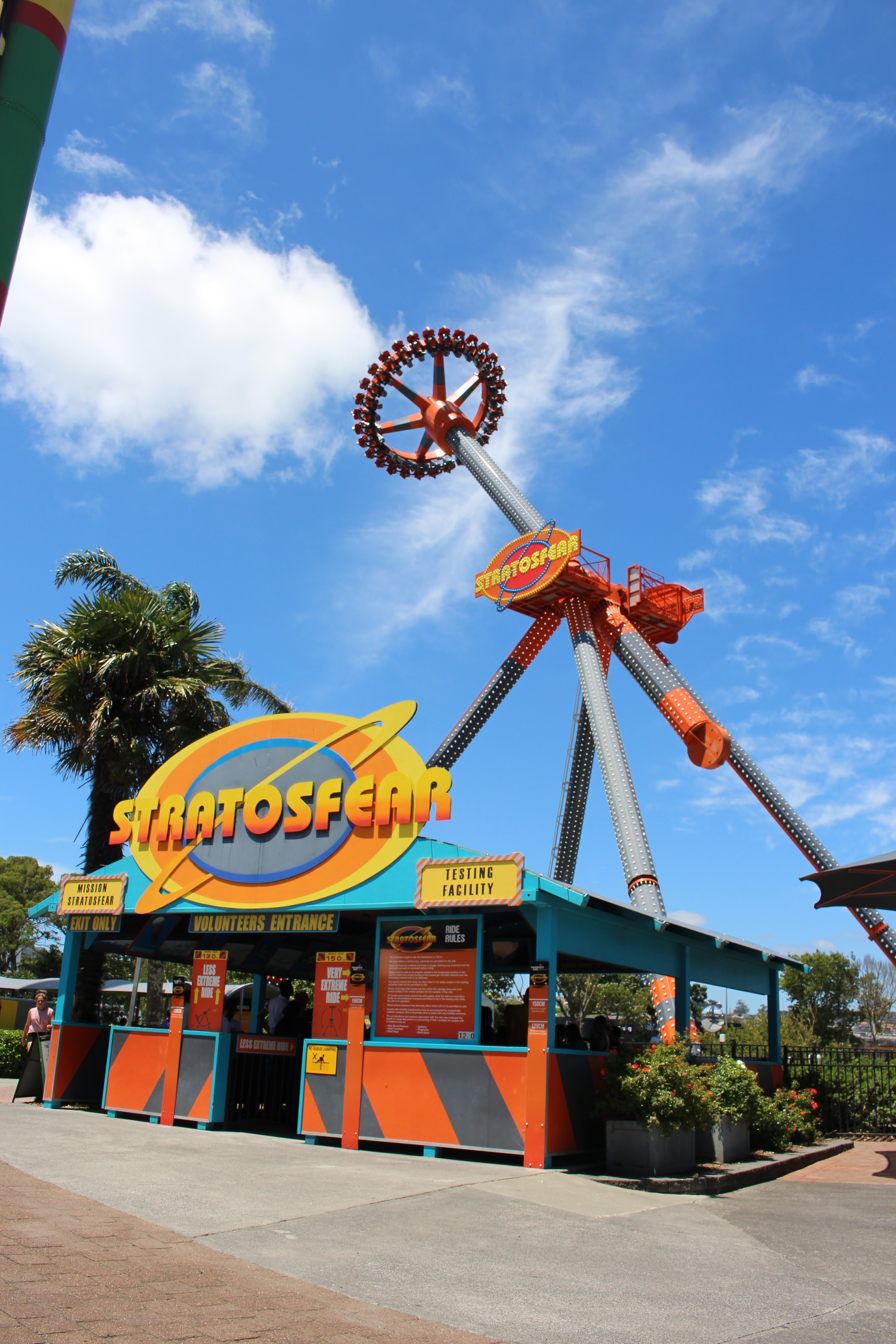
Stratosfear - Extreme

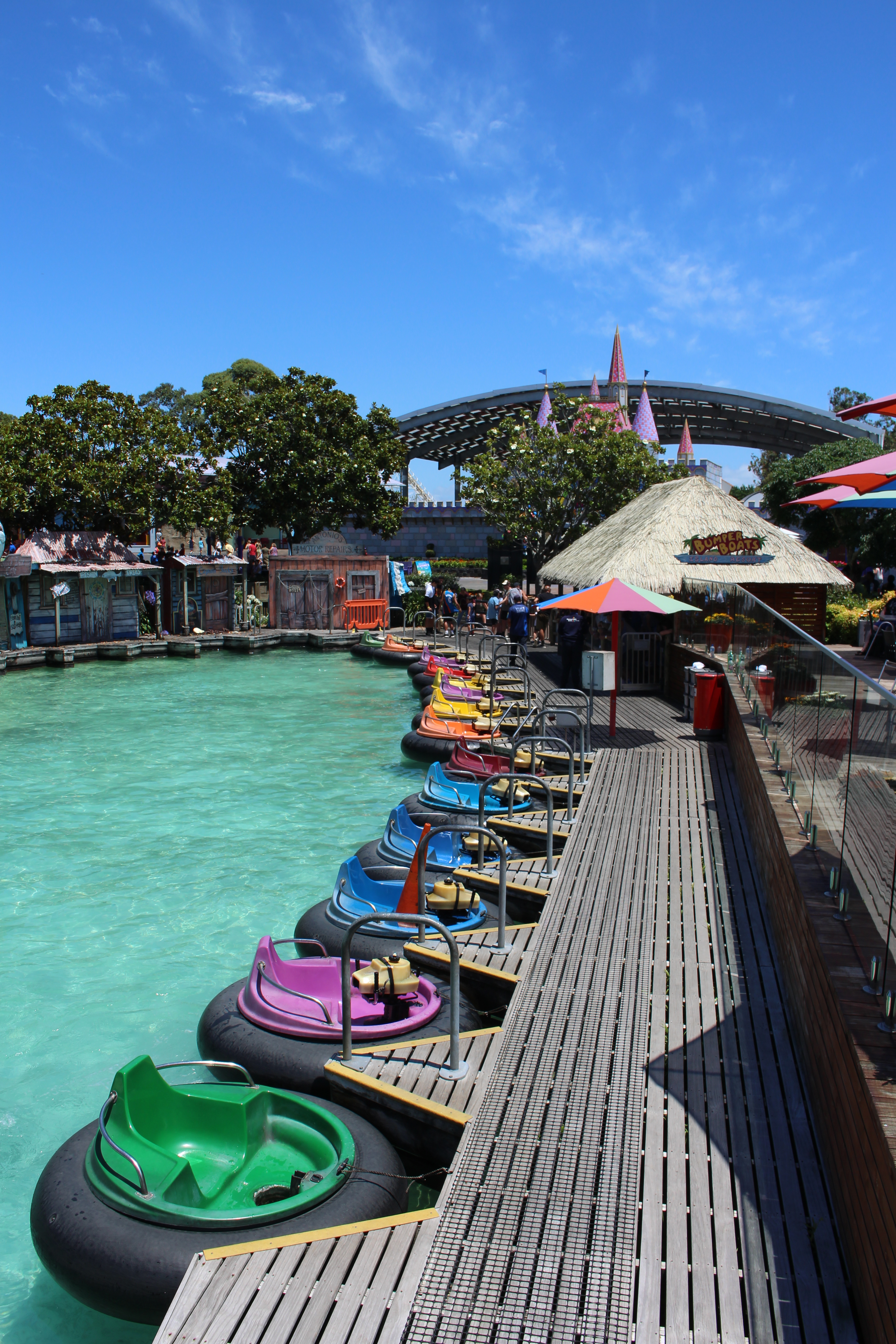
Bumper Boats

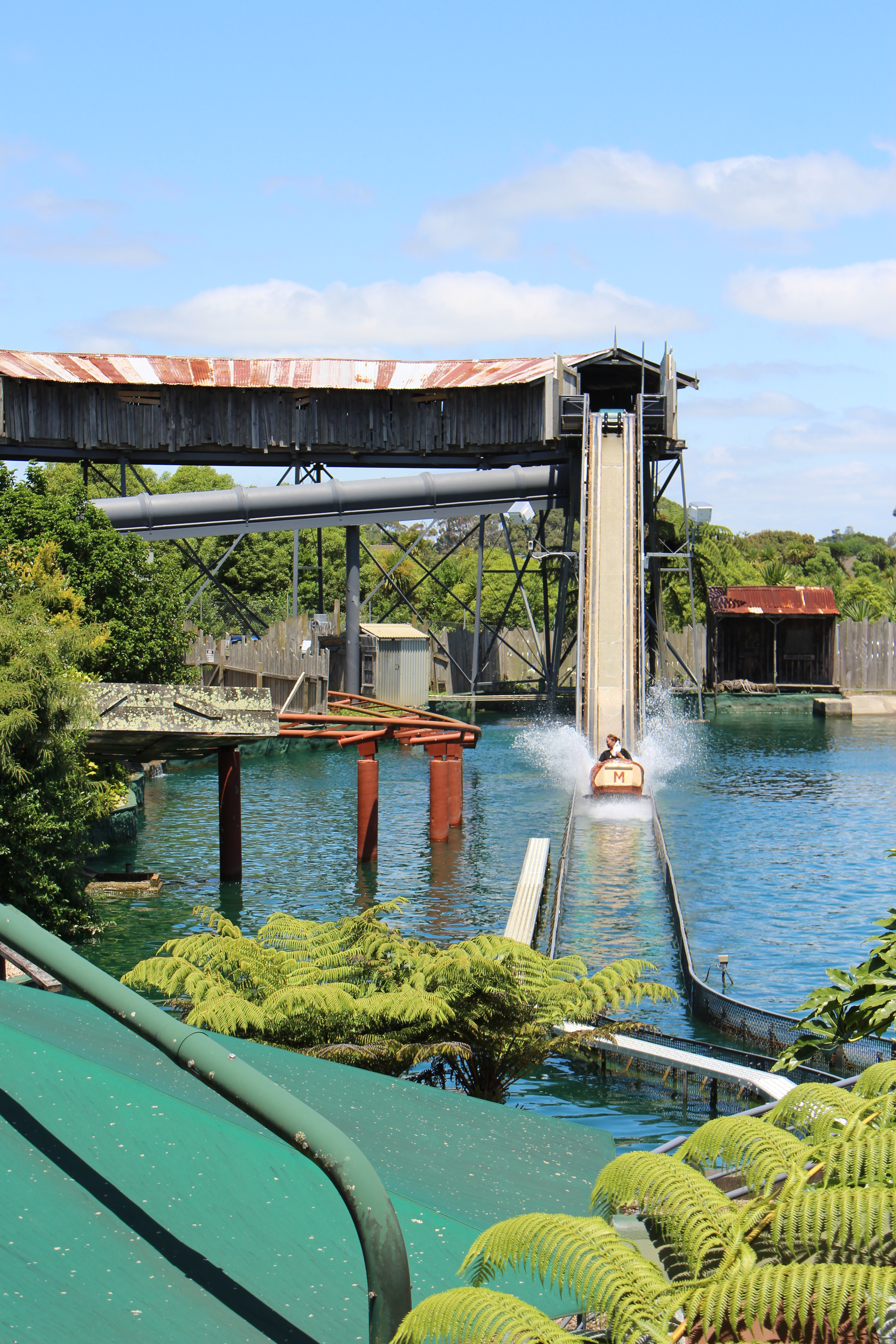
Enchanted Forest Log Flume

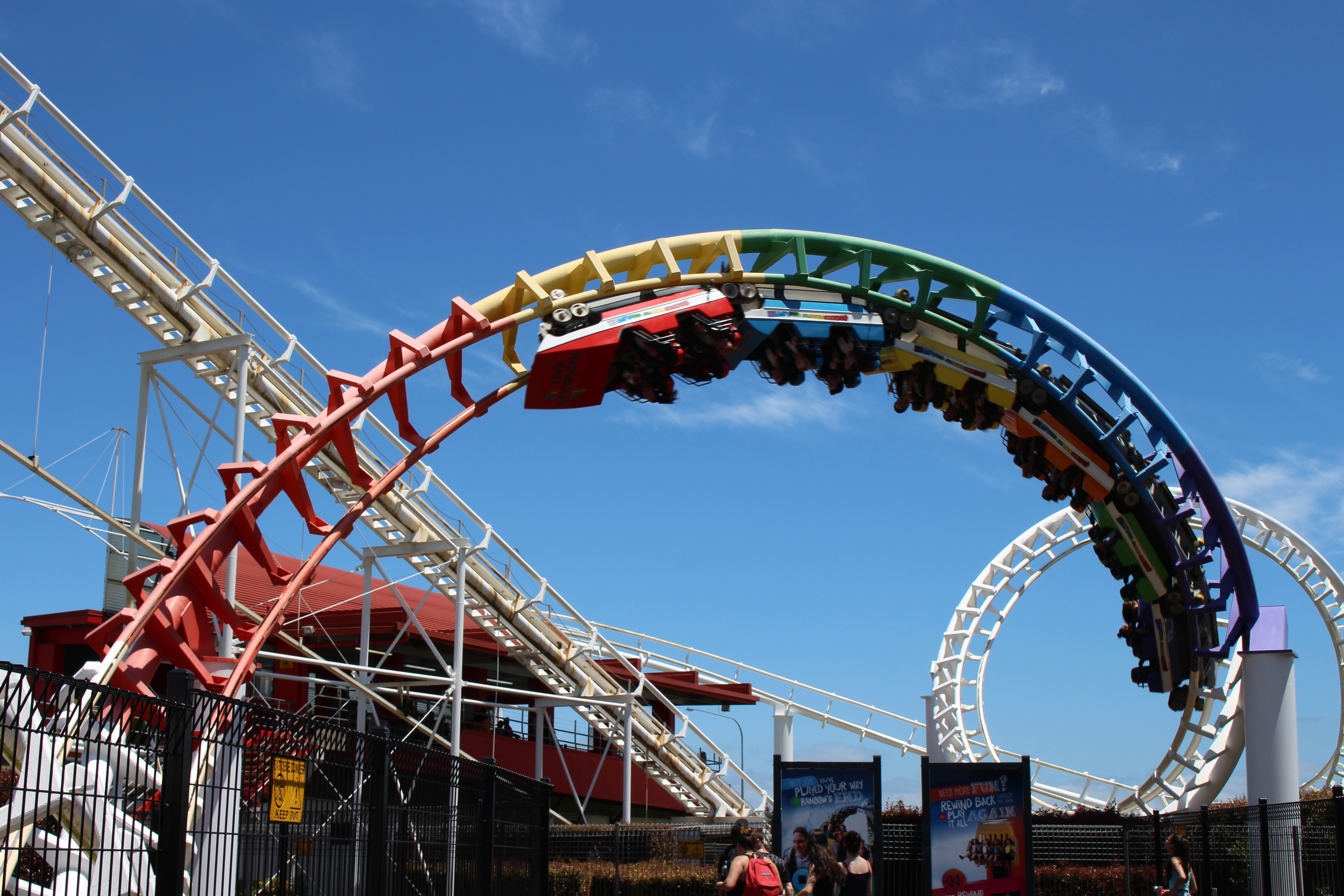
Corkscrew Coaster

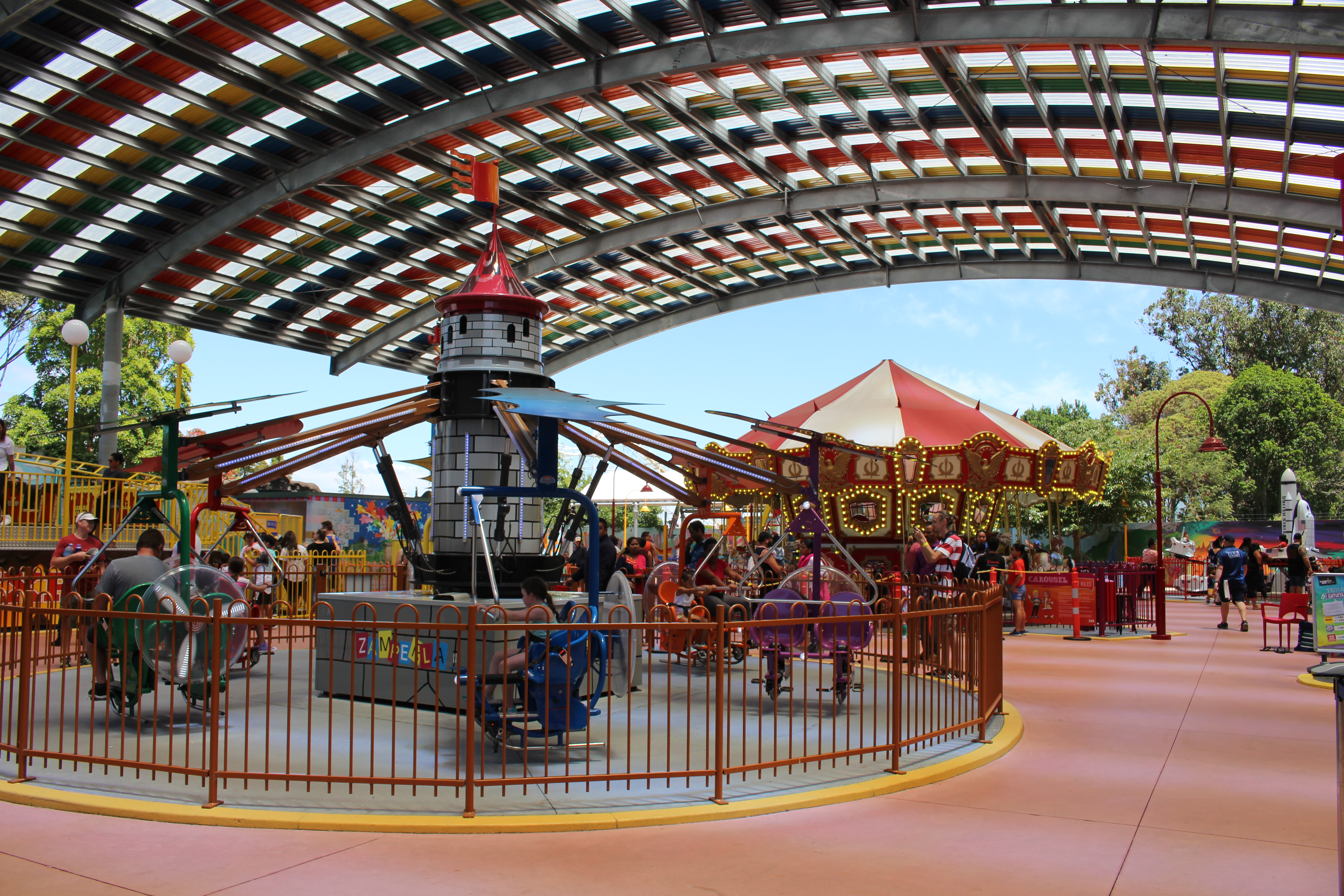
Kidz Kingdom Outdoor

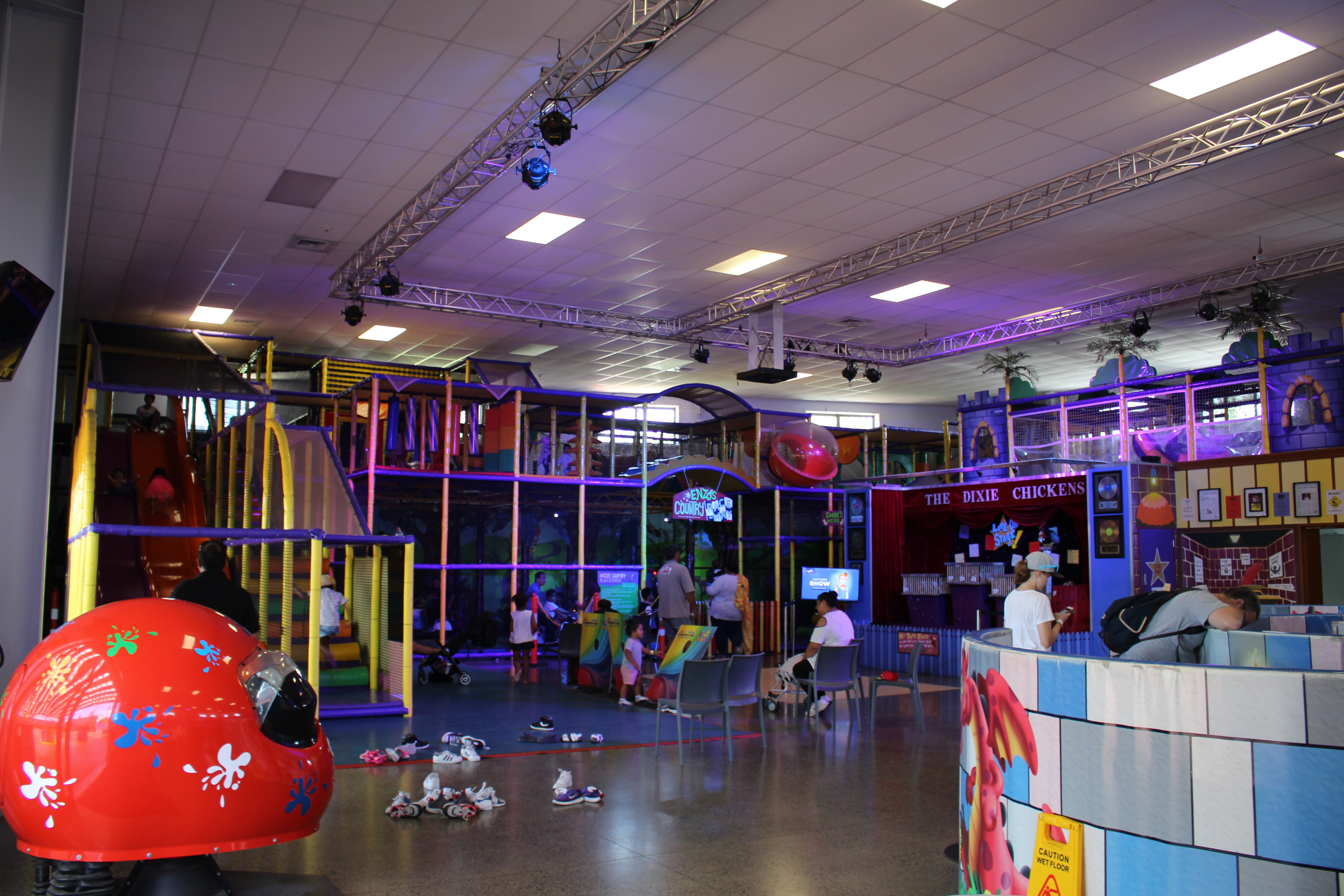
Kidz Kingdom Indoor

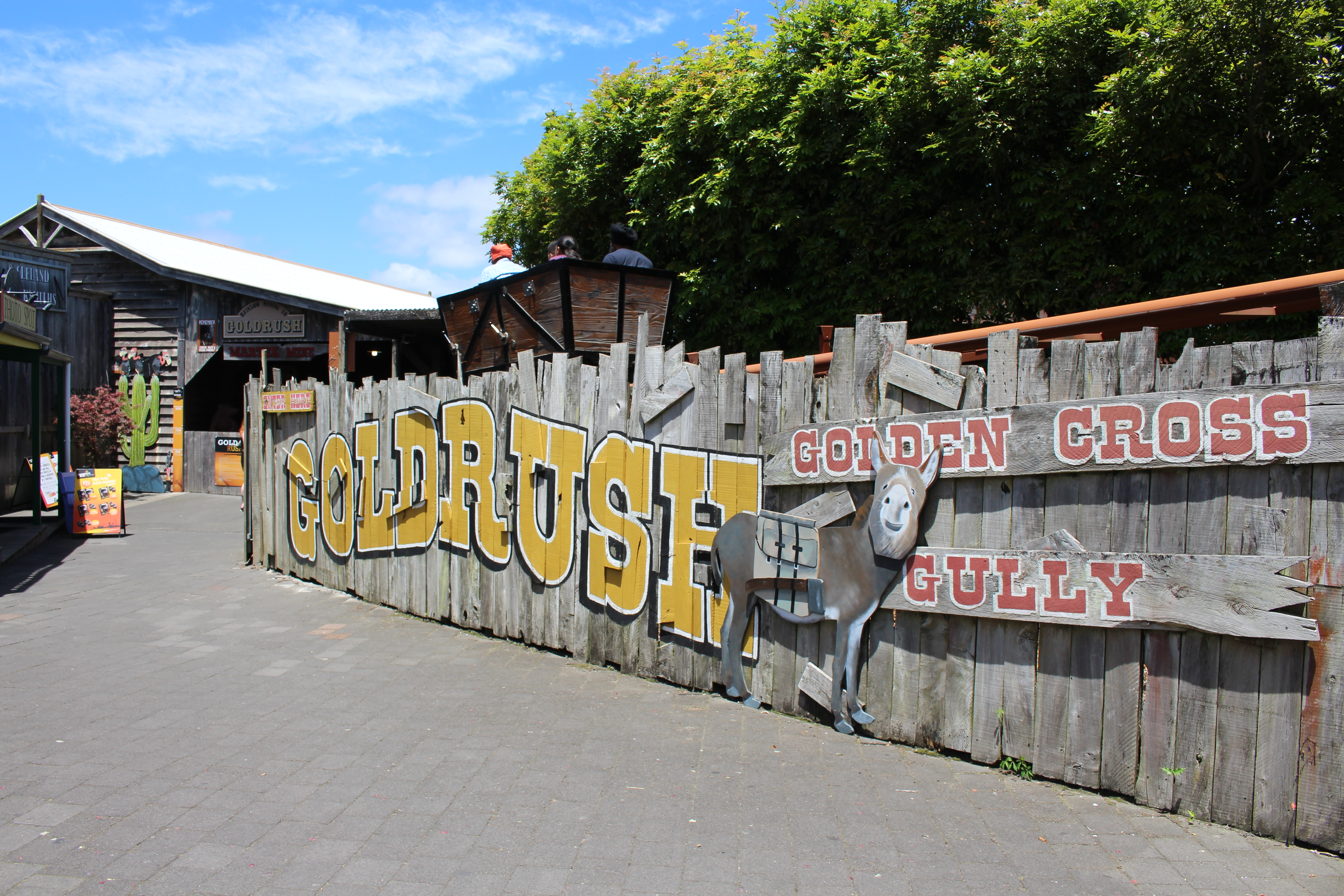
Goldrush

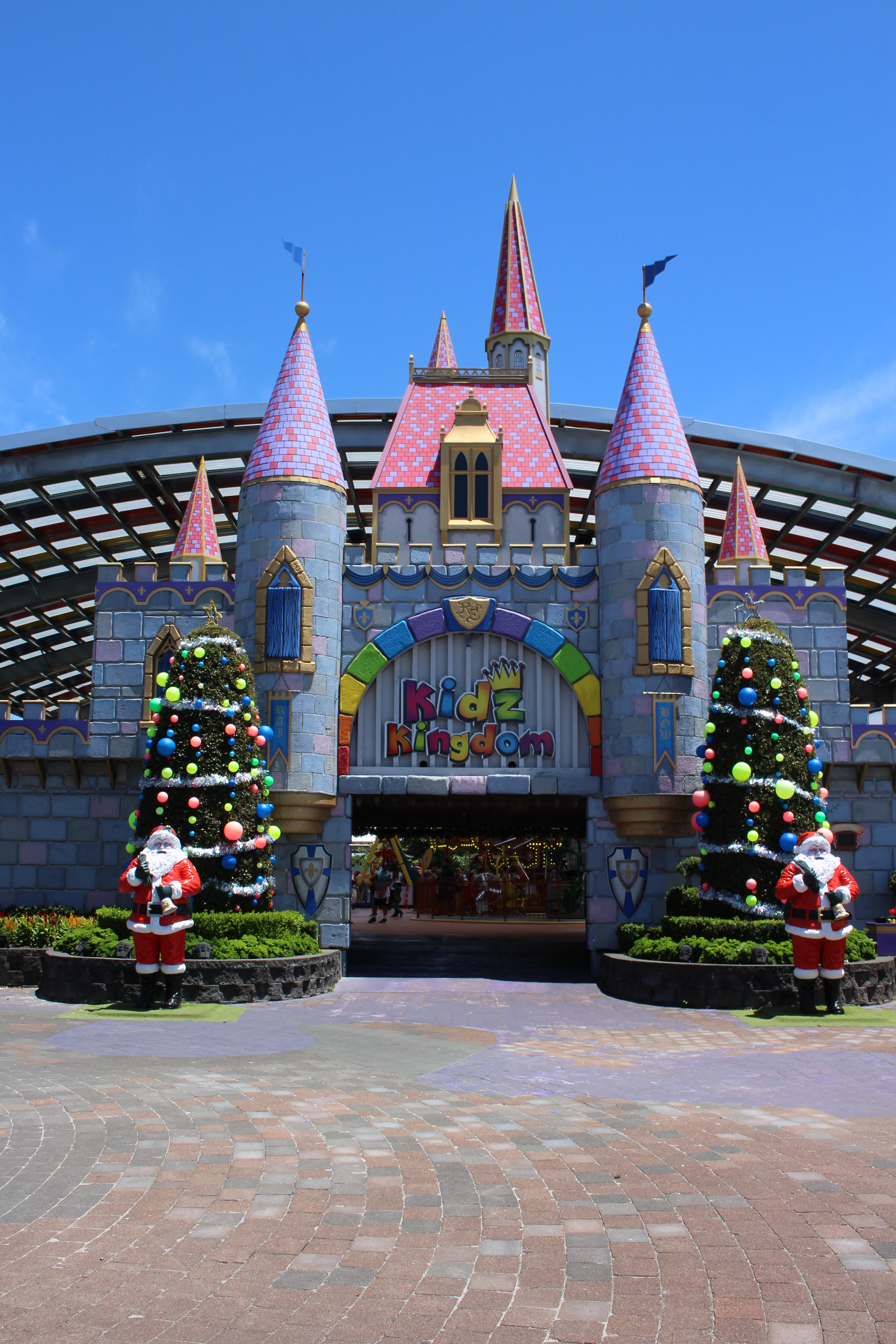
Kidz Kingdom - Parkside

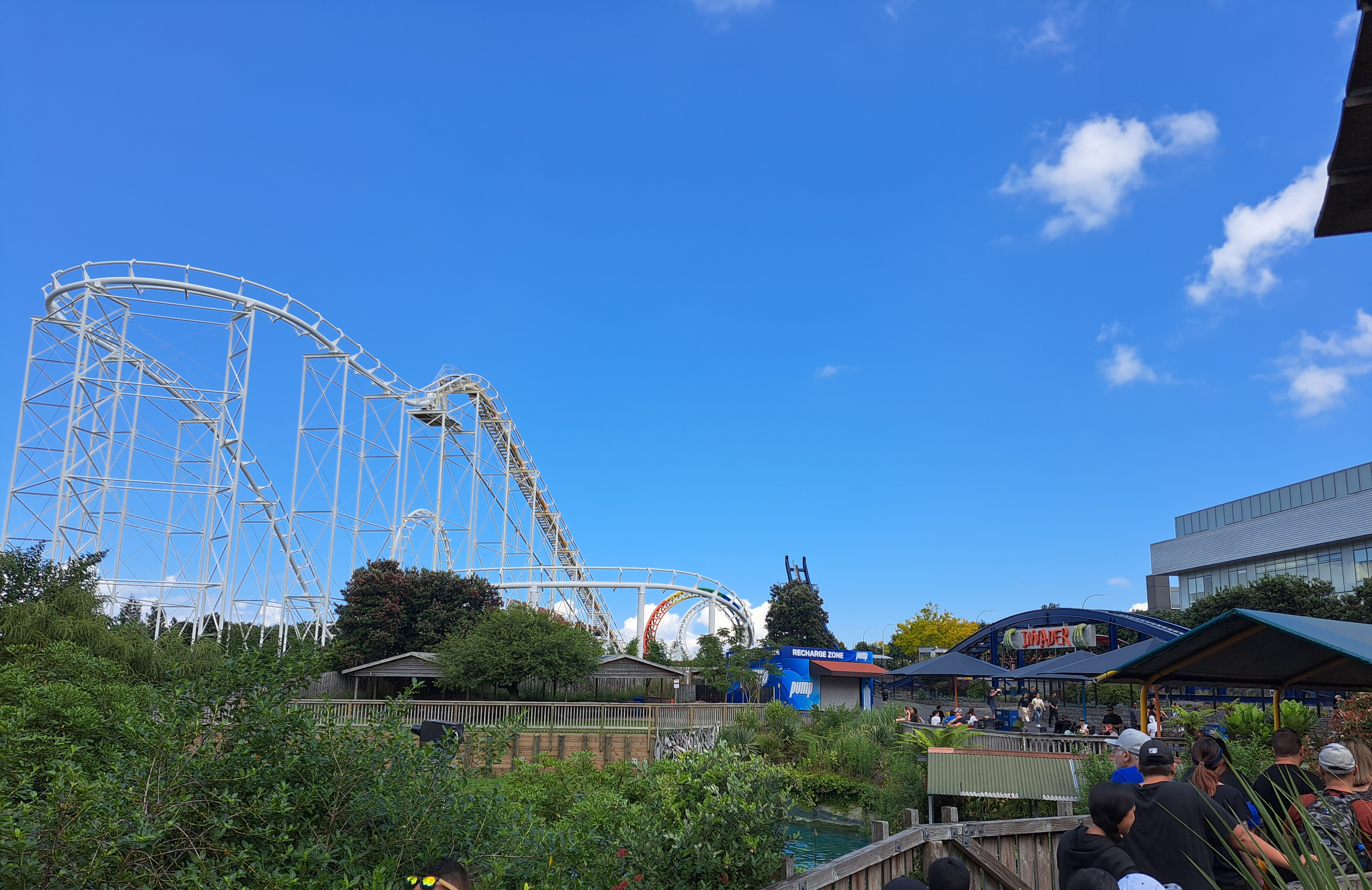
Corkscrew and Invader

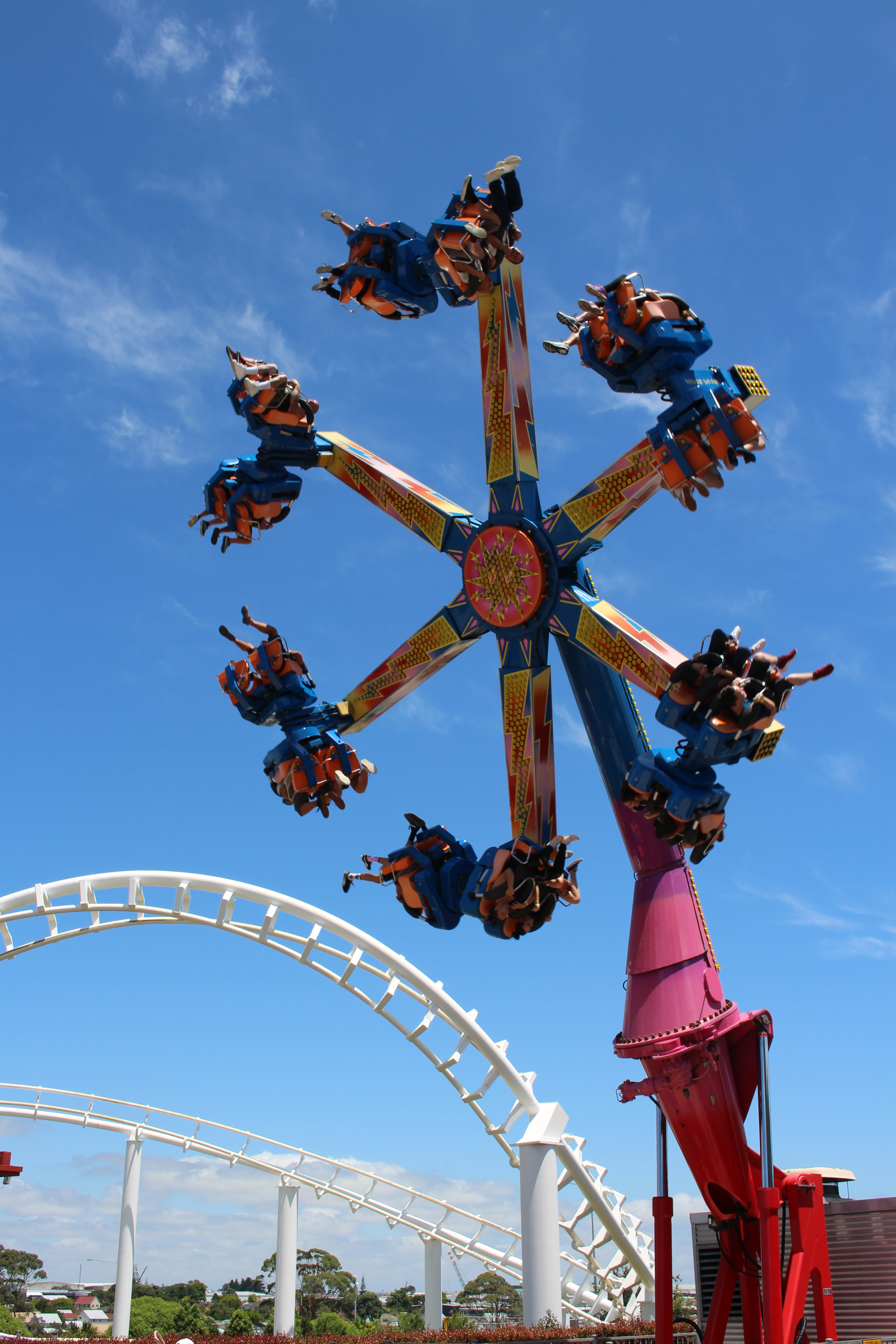
Power Surge

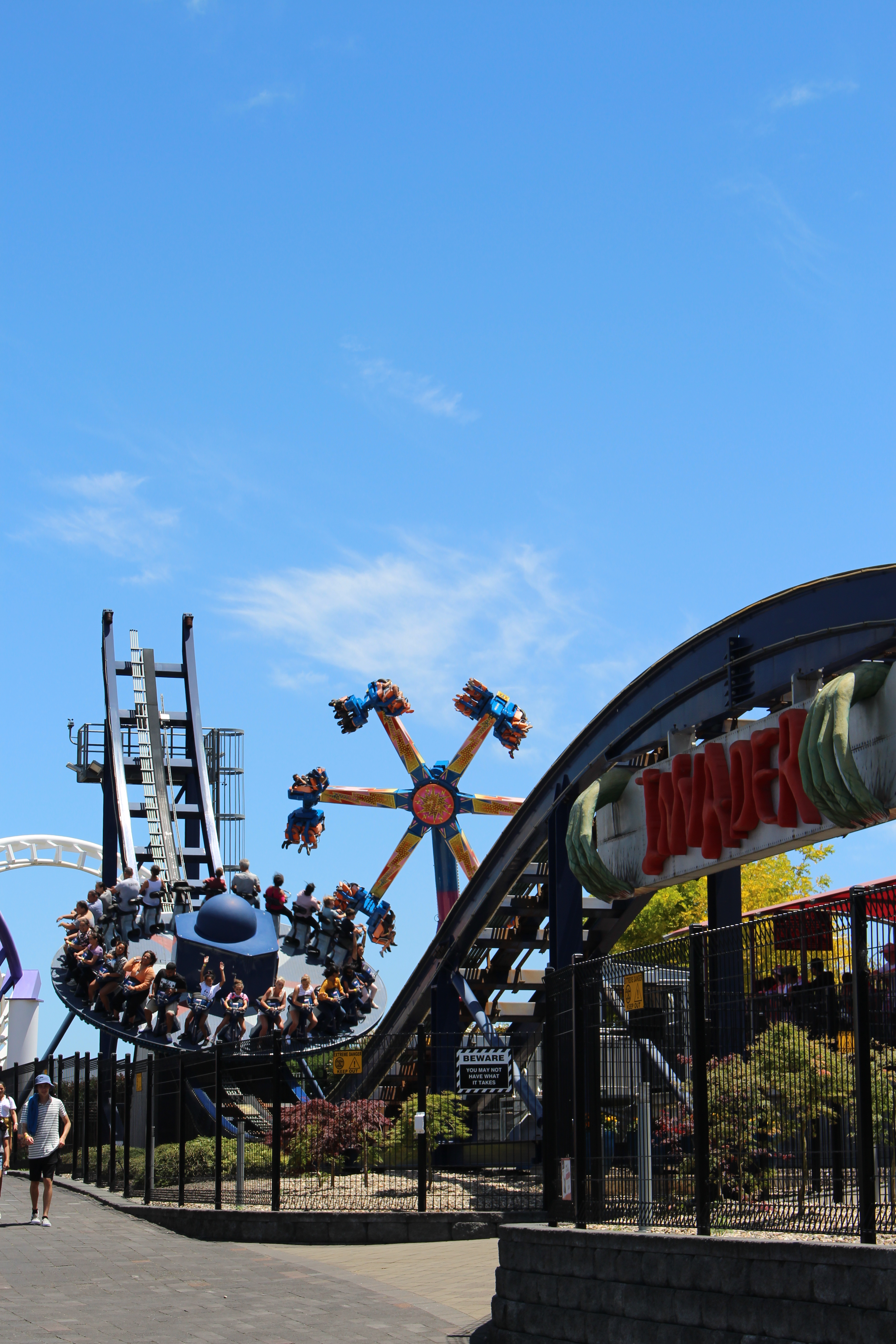
Invader and Power Surge

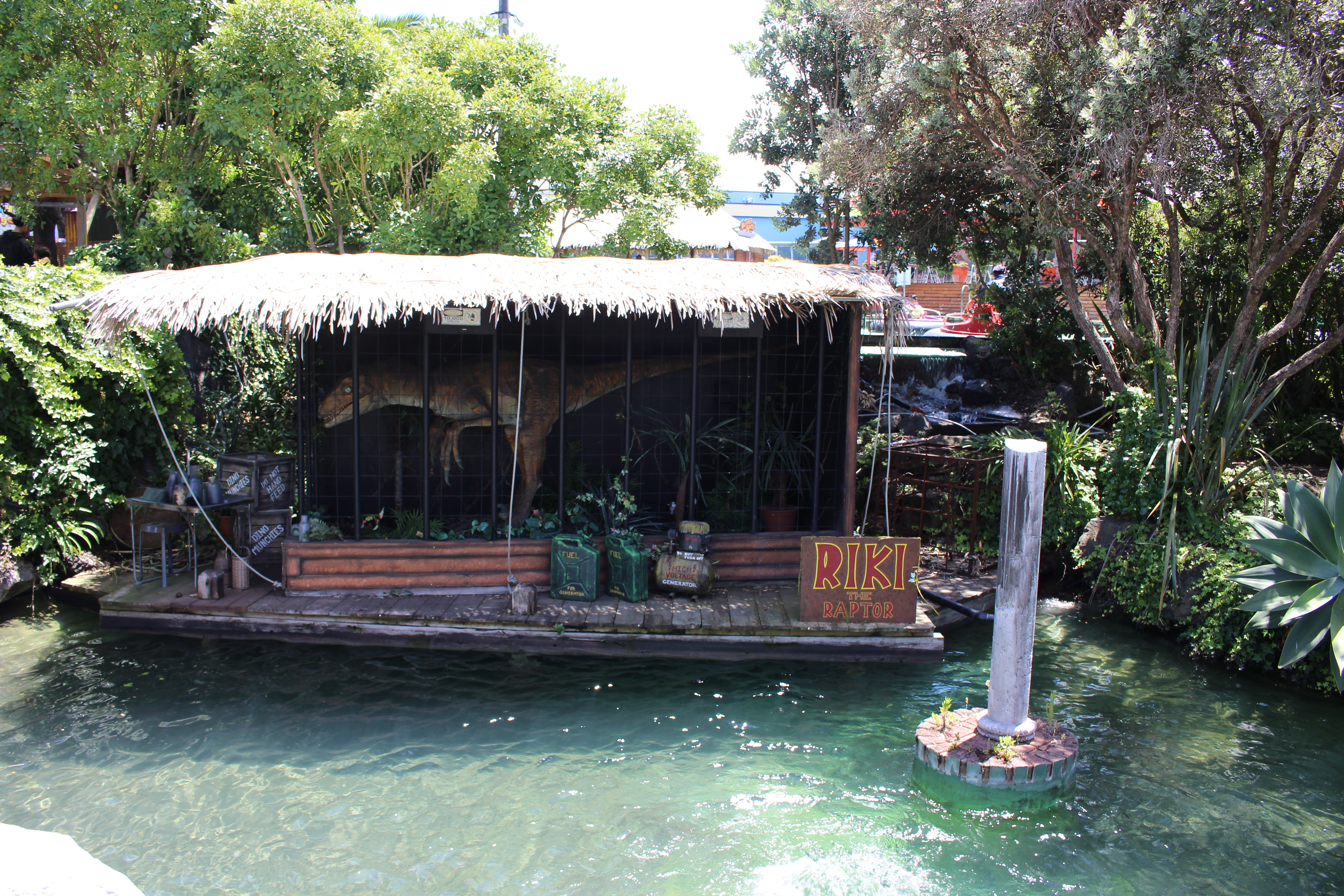
Riki the Raptor
