= Clarence Pier =

Pier in Portsmouth, England

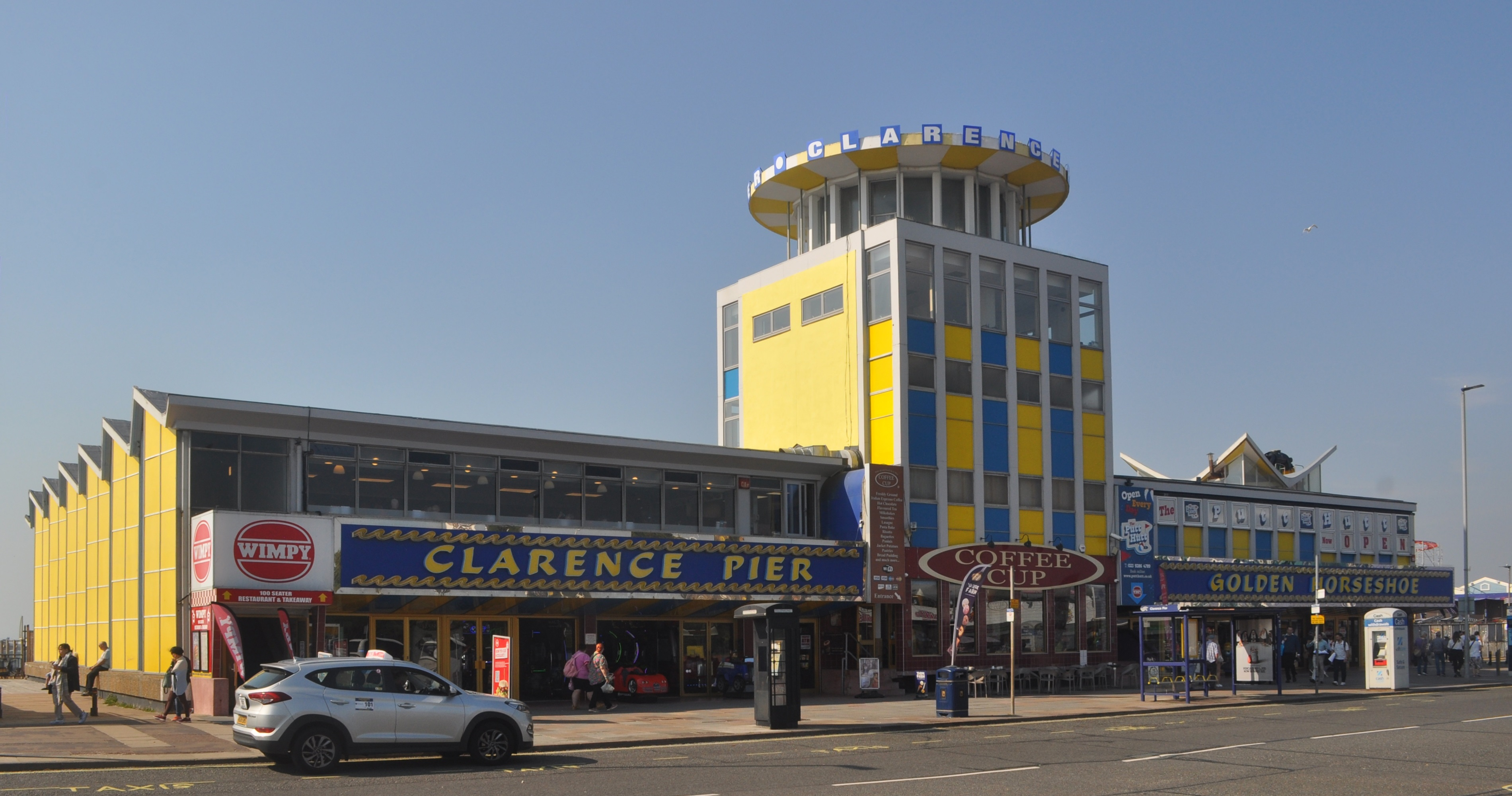
- The pier in September 2024
- Interactive map of Clarence Pier
- Location: Portsmouth, England
- Coordinates: 50°47.164′N 1°06.068′W
- Opened: 1861
- Slogan: Fun and thrills for all the family!
- Operating season: March to Late September

Attractions
- Total: 13 (14 including Golf)
- Roller coasters: 2
- Water rides: 1
- Website: clarencepier.co.uk

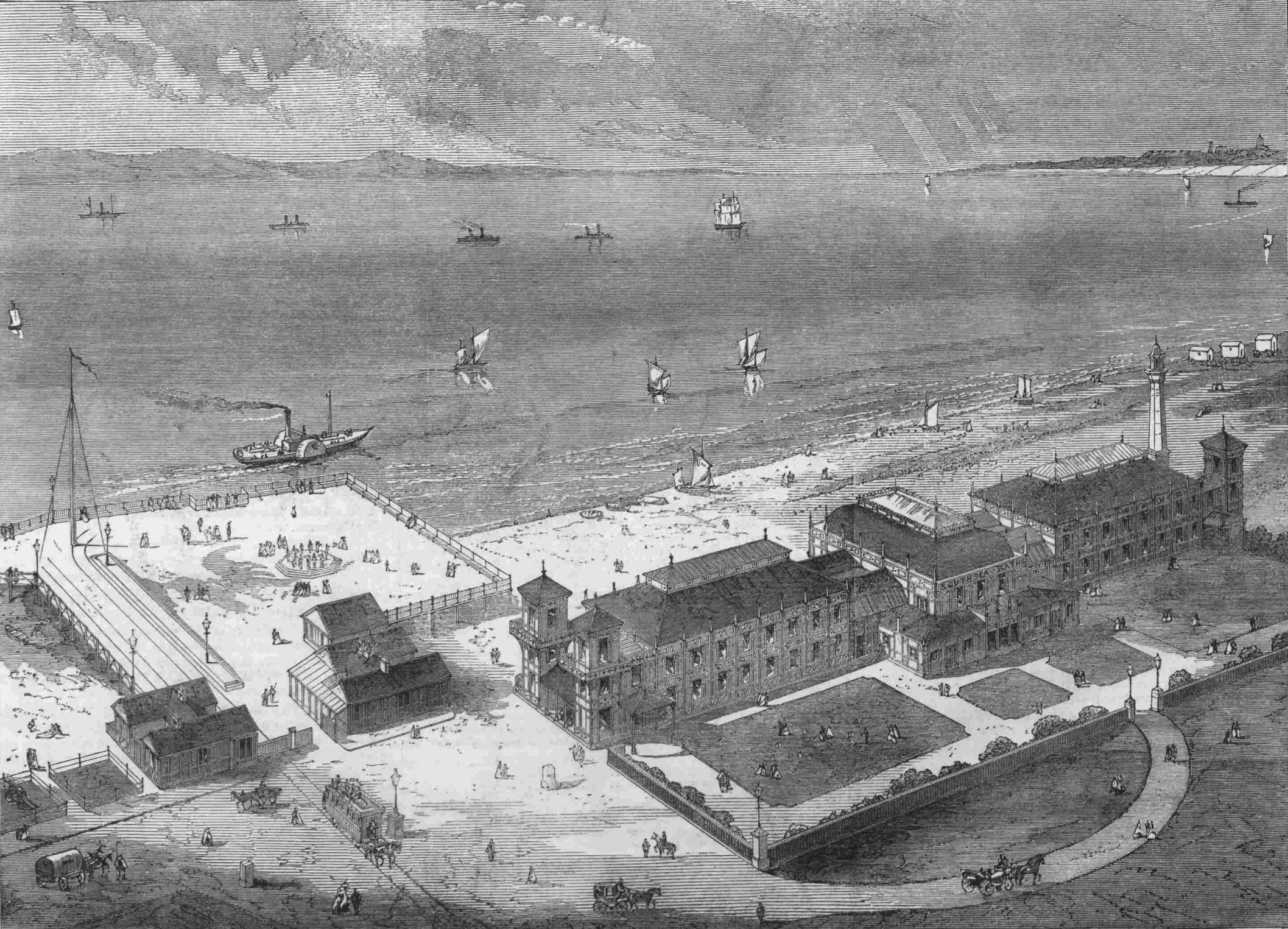
A 1871 view of Clarence Pier (left) and the Assembly Rooms (right).

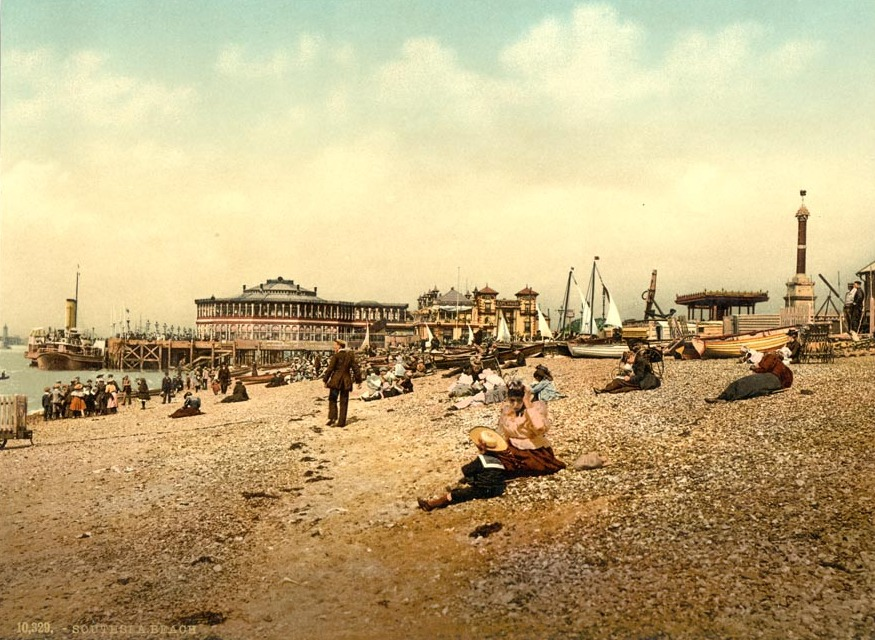
Historic photochrome of the beach and Clarence Pier.

Clarence Pier is an amusement pier in Portsmouth, Hampshire. It is located next to Southsea Hoverport. Unlike most seaside piers in the UK, the pier does not extend very far out to sea and instead goes along the coast.

== History ==
The pier was originally constructed and opened in 1861 by the Prince and Princess of Wales. It boasted a regular ferry service to the Isle of Wight. In 1874, the pier's management attempted to close public access to the beach between the pier and the Hot Walls in Old Portsmouth. This led to four days of rioting which became known as the Battle of Southsea.

It was damaged by air raids during World War II, along with the associated Southsea Baths and Assembly rooms.

The pier's decking and landing stages were reconstructed in concrete in 1953–54. The work was carried out by Jno Croad Ltd of Portsmouth to the designs of L. G. Mouchel & Partners Ltd of London. The Lady Mayoress of Portsmouth, Mrs. Frank Miles, drove the first pile on the beach on 10 June 1953 and the pier reopened to the public in June 1954.

Temporary kiosks were initially used on the pier until permanent construction work was carried out. The new main building was built between 1959 and 1961 to the designs of the local architects A. E. Cogswell & Sons, R. Lewis Reynish and P. G. Beresford. The contractor, John Hunt Ltd of Gosport, undertook the work for £180,000, with a further £20,000 spent on furnishing and equipment. It was opened on 1 June 1961 by the Lord Mayor of Portsmouth, Ralph Bonner Pink. The new building provided a restaurant, bars, kiosks and ballroom, as well as a 60 feet high observation tower.

== About ==
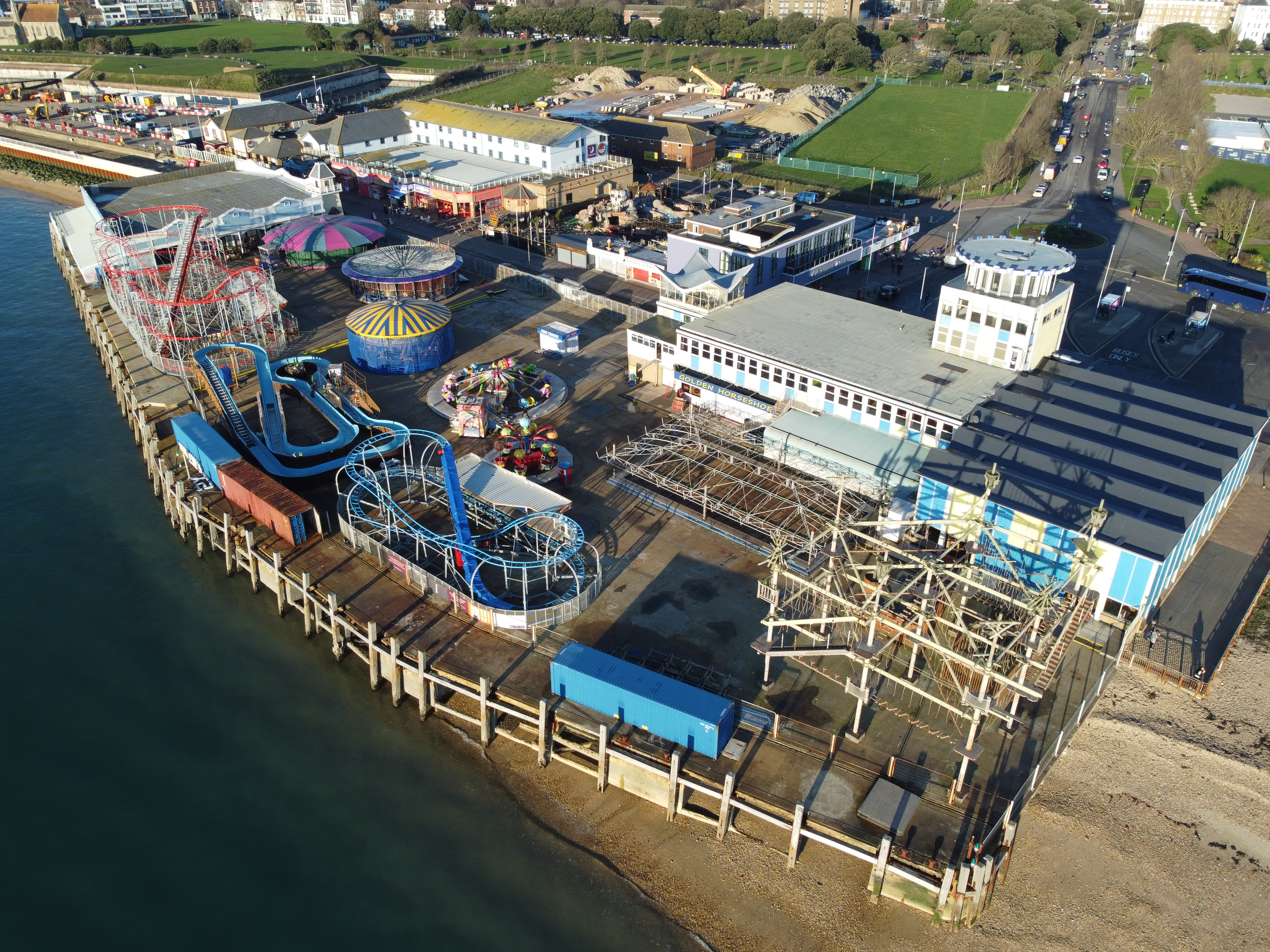
Aerial view from the Solent towards the fairground

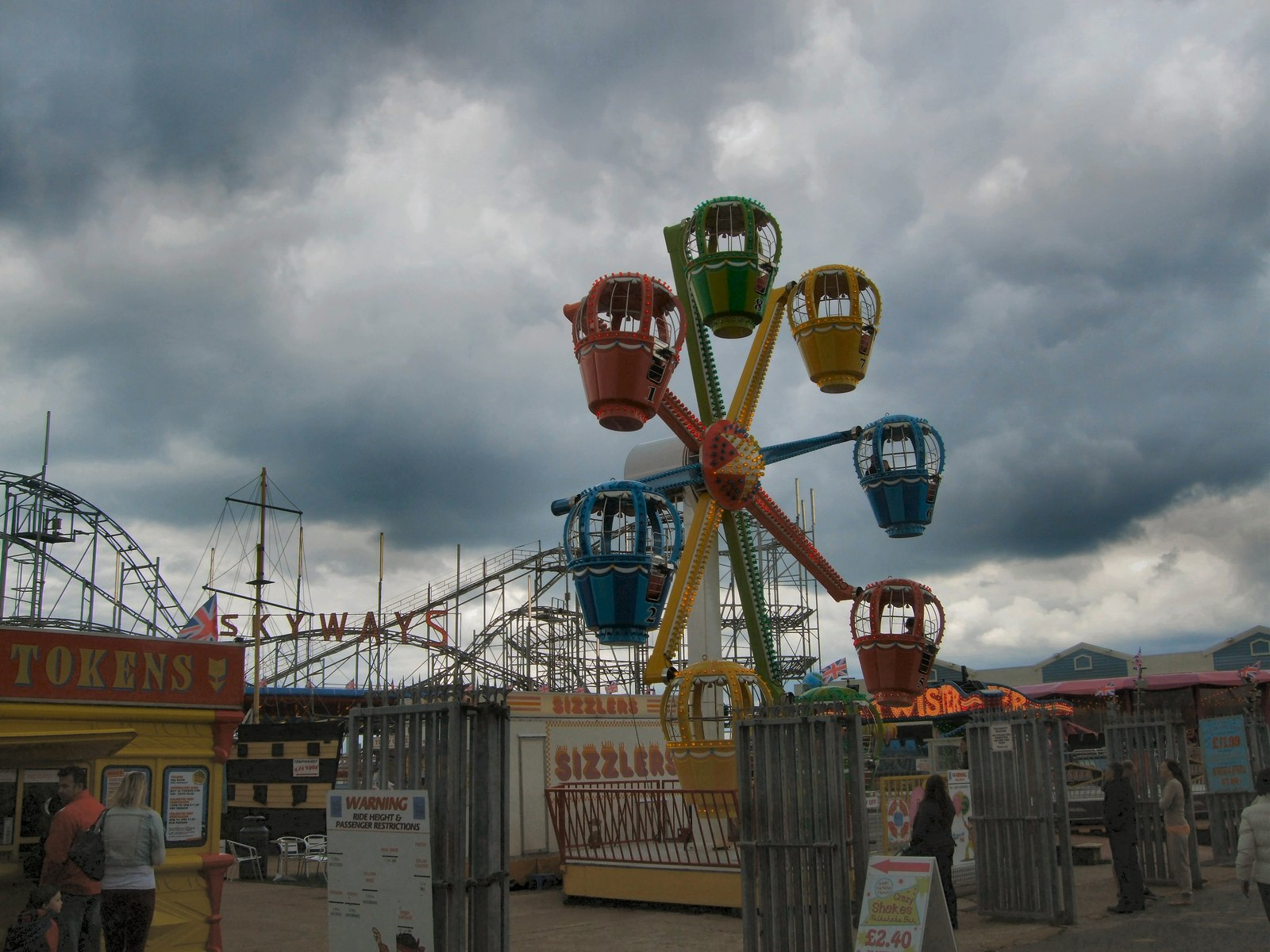
Rides at the fairground

The complex consists of a striking pavilion building with distinctive yellow and blue cladding and a small tower, with a fellow building next to it, where the entrance to the rides is located.

The main funfair operates on a free admission, pay-per-ride token-based system. In the early 1980s the amusement park was named "Fun Acres" and as well as the whole pier itself, it also took up 3500 sq metres or so of land to the north-west of the northern part of the pier. This part of the park was cleared and redeveloped as another arcade called "Southsea Island Leisure", The Clarence Pier Public House, a crazy golf course and a Premier Inn during the 1990s, therefore the park itself is significantly smaller than it used to be.

The original northern part of the park formerly contained the 56-seat Corbiere Spherical Ferris Wheel, a large dodgem car arena, giant slides, a spinning centrifuge ride, amusement arcades, stalls, shops, a traditional Gallopers carousel and a ghost train among other attractions. The token booths were shaped as mushrooms.

One of the main landmarks of Clarence Pier until the mid-1990s was the Super Loop ride, since removed. The Ferris wheel was sold and relocated to Pleasureland Southport. One ride which lasted the duration was the Skyways roller coaster which was removed in 2018.

=== Golden Horseshoe ===
The main building, known as the "Golden Horseshoe", houses a fairly large amusement arcade as well as a small bowling alley. During the building's reconstruction following the original building's bombing during the war, the venue housed a Cafeteria, Ballroom and various gift shops before becoming an arcade during the 1980s.

A Coffee Cup Café opened up in 2009 in a section that formerly housed a Prize Bingo Hall.

The first floor of the building houses a Wimpy bar which is located within a door on the left of the Golden Horseshoe or a set of stairs situated in the venue.

==== Pirates and Princesses Play Area/The Putt Hutt ====
The right side of the Golden Horseshoe housed an indoor playground called the "Pirates and Princesses Play Area", which opened in 1985 as Pirate Pete's and closed at the beginning of January 2023 after 37 years of service.

It was replaced with an indoor miniature Golf course named "The Putt Hutt", which opened in August 2023.

=== The "Clarence Pier" ===
A smaller building, perpendicular but not physically joined to the main pavilion houses another amusement arcade, named the "Clarence Pier". It was constructed for Portsmouth brewers Brickwoods Ltd in 1958 as the Seahorse Bars to replace an earlier public house of the same name that was bombed during World War II. It was designed by W. H. Saunders & Son and the brewery's staff architect, J. V. Nisbet.

The public house, later operated by Whitbread, was renamed "Barnum's" in 1990 before being destroyed in a fire in 1993. During the building's refurbishment, the former pub was converted into 'Jurassic 3001', a futuristic dinosaur-themed dark ride, which opened in 1994. The ride's exterior featured an animatronic triceratops, whose head protruded from the side of the building and roared occasionally at passers-by. The attraction closed in 2001, yet all ride signage and theming on the building remained until the end of 2011.

The amusement arcade located on the ground floor was known as the "Wheel Of Fortune" for many years until being renamed to its current name in 2012. The upper floor space previously occupied by Jurassic 3001 underwent a conversion to apartments, according to planning publications, in 2012. Next to the venue are some small gift shops.

=== Other facilities ===
A building at the side of the funfair houses an arcade called "Games Wharf" and a food concession stand. Another arcade - Southsea Island Leisure, is opposite Games Wharf; although it operates under separate management from the other three arcades on site.

== In pop-culture ==
"Mind the Baby, Mr. Bean", an episode of British TV comedy series Mr. Bean was filmed on location at Clarence Pier (as well as other locations in Southsea) and aired on ITV in 1994. This was prior to the closure of the north-western part of the park and the closure of the Wheel Of Fortune public house. The episode shows the Super Loop, Skyways roller coaster, and many of the park's other attractions from that time. Clarence Pier was also the filming location to the teen pop band, "S Club Juniors" song, "Fool No More" filmed mainly on the dodgems but the rollercoaster, 'Skyways' can also be seen in the video.

== Attractions ==
Key
Roller Coasters
Water Rides
Dark Rides

=== Operating ===
Name	Opened	Manufacturer	Description
Tidal Wave	2019	SBF Visa Group	An MX 611 Spinning Coaster.
Canyon River	2020	SBF Visa Group	A small one-drop Log Flume.
Air Raid Extreme	2026	Tivoli Manufacturing	Orbiter ride, lent to the pier for the 2026 season.
Carousel	1998	J.H. Rundle	A modern version of a traditional Carousel, which replaced an older set.
Diamond Dodgems	2017	Barbieri	a traditional Bumper Cars ride. Up to 1 or 2 people can fit per car. This set previously operated at Presthaven Sands Holiday Camp before being moved to Clarence Pier.
Jumping Bugs	2023	Zamperla	A Jump Around ride.
Mad Mouse	2019	SBF Visa Group	A Cyclon coaster. It is a similar coaster model to the Galaxi Coaster Skyways, which this coaster replaced.
Runaway Train	2025	Güven Amusement Rides Factory	A kiddie coaster lent to the Pier by its owner for the 2025 and 2026 seasons.
Seal Creek	2022	John H. Rundle	A roundabout ride with Seal-themed cars. It was originally located at the Weymouth Sea Life Centre.
Tea Party	2023	Amusement Technical	Standard Teacups ride. It was formerly located at Dreamland Margate as the "Wedgwood Teacups".
Twister	2004	Sonacase	A modern version of a traditional Twister Ride. 3 people can sit per car with a total of 12 cars. The ride was previously owned by an independent operator before being sold to the Pier. Since the 2019 season, the ride has been enclosed.
Waltzer	1982	Maxwell of Scotland	A traditional Waltzer, which replaced an older version. It was known as Power Spin 2000 until 2003. Although the signage and lighting has changed various times, the ride has been the same model.

=== Other ===
Name	Opened	Description
Treasure Island Golf	Early 2000s	A pirate-themed mini-golf course. It is owned by the management of the Southsea Island Leisure arcade.
The Putt Hutt	2023	Indoor Crazy Golf course located where Pirates and Princesses Play Area formerly was. It contains a standard Crazy Golf course alongside a fairground course based on Clarence Pier's history. A bar named "The 19th Hole" is also located within the venue.
Upside Down House	2023	The UK’s first inverted photo experience. Costs £5 to experience.

=== Former attractions ===
Name	First season	Final Season	Manufacturer	Description
Big Wheel	2025	2025	N/A	Large Ferris Wheel attraction that was lent to the Pier by its owner for the 2025 season. Previously seen in Portsmouth at Gunwharf Quays during Christmas 2024.
Super Trooper	2024	2024	PWS Rides	A modern take on the classic Paratrooper ride. A different model to the one used during the 2021-2022 seasons, it was previously seen at Alton Towers in 2021.
Tornado	2023	2024	KMG	KMG Freakout pendulum ride. It was lent to the Pier for the 2023 and 2024 seasons. It operated at Barry Island Pleasure Park for 2022 under its current owner and has also traveled in Norway for many years. It is most well known for being at Funland Hayling Island from 2003 until 2006.
Bounce	2003; 2023	2003; 2023	Safeco	A Jump and Smile ride on-loan from an independent operator. It was lent to the pier for the 2003 and 2023 seasons.
Music Trip!	2021	2022	Fairmatt	Traditional Miami ride lent to the pier from its owner for the 2021-2022 seasons.
Super Trooper	2021	2022	PWS Rides	A modern take on the classic Paratrooper ride. Was on loan from an independent operator for the 2021 and 2022 seasons.
Flying Dumbos	2015	2022	Kolmax-Plus	A flying elephants ride.
Hot Air Balloons	2011	2022	I.E. Park	A Samba Balloon ride. Was previously operated at Dreamland Margate (2002-2004) and Fort Fun Amusement Park (2005-2010). Now located at Brighton Palace Pier.
Sky Trail/Pier Pressure	2011	2021	Innovative Leisure	A High Ropes Course. It was dismantled in 2021, and its former site is now occupied by the Upside Down House.
Balloon Wheel	2010	2021	SBF Visa Group	Junior Ferris Wheel with Balloon-shaped cars. It was relocated to Web Adventure Park in York for the 2022 season and currently sits at Primrose Valley Holiday Park.
Circus Train	2016	2021		A Juvenile train ride with a locomotive and three carriages. This is the first ride at the pier to be operated via a remote control unit, carried by the person operating the ride.
Solent Wheel	2016	2020	Technical Park	A 110 ft Ferris Wheel. The wheel contains 24 carriages (including a V.I.P. Carriage) which could sit up to 6 people (the V.I.P. carriage could sit up to 4 people). It did not return for the 2017 season after a Brent Geese scare and sat at Great Yarmouth Pleasure Beach before returning to the pier for the 2018 season and remaining there for the next two years, until September 2020, when it was removed and dismantled after being sold to an independent fairground operator.
Toy Carousel	2016	2019		A mini Carousel ride.
Crazy Slide	2017	2018		An inflatable slide.
Flying Planes	2018	2018		A small Aeroplane ride that moves in a circle, and has a Disney Planes theme. It was on loan from an independent operator for the 2018 season.
Happy Catapiller	2018	2018		A Wacky Worm Roller Coaster in place of Skyways after it was dismantled and was on loan from an independent operator. In 2019, it was moved on loan to the nearby South Parade Pier.
Skyways	1980	2017		An S.D.C. Galaxi Roller Coaster which replaced a wooden wild mouse roller coaster. The ride featured in a Mr Bean comedy sketch. The coaster was dismantled in 2018, and although the ride was thought to return in 2020, the cars for the ride were sold to an independent buyer, who confirmed that the ride would not be returning, and the track had been scrapped.
Tea Cups	Unknown	2017		A small Teacups ride with 5 cups seating up to four children each. This set underwent a major renovation for the 2016 season with the addition of Disney artwork.
Speedy Gonzales/Speedy Coaster	2011	2017	D.P.V. Rides	A Speedy Gonzales themed Junior Coaster. It first operated at Leisureranch in Dorset before being sold to Clarence Pier. The coaster was removed from the Pier after the 2017 season and relocated to Ocean Beach Pleasure Park in South Shields for the 2018 season, where it was it was given a new lick of paint.
Blade Runner	2015/2017	2015/2017	Safeco	A Breakdance ride. It operated as a traveling ride that had gone through various fairground operators before being loaned to the Pier in 2015 and 2017 by its then-owner. After its 2017 run, the ride's ownership moved on to the Italian fairground circuit.
Dodgems	2000	2016	Bertazzon	A Dodgems set. One or two people can fit into each car. Replaced with a newer set for the 2017 season and scrapped afterward.
Flying Kiddie Cars	2015	2015		Small roundabout ride. It was also on loan from an independent operator who sat this ride on the pier for the 2015 season.
Formula 2000	2002	2015		A small Convoy Ride where a train of cars goes along a small circuit with a bridge. It was removed at the end of the 2015 season to make way for the Solent Wheel.
Swing Tower	2013	2014	AK Rides	A mini Vertical Swing ride. Originally built and traveling the Slovak fairground circuit, the ride was lent to the pier for the 2013 and 2014 seasons. It later traveled the UK fairground circuit under the name of "Star Flyer" and currently sits at Rainbow Park in Norfolk.
Extreme Rotor	2011	2013	A.R.M.	A Rotor that sat on the pier for three seasons. Currently owned by an independent fairground operator and travels the UK.
Toon Town Express	unknown	2012		A small rotating train ride.
Mega Dance	2012	2012	Fabbri Group	An Orbiter ride. Originally traveled the Dutch and Austrian fairground circuits before a period at Pleasurewood Hills, and went through various owners before being lent to the pier for the 2012 season. The ride left the UK in 2015 and has since been sold to a French operator and is currently on the Spanish fairground circuit.
FEAR	2011	2011		A haunted house attraction. It was owned by various fairground operators before being lent to the Pier for the 2011 season. Currently located at Courtown Harbour Amusement Park in Ireland.
Jets	2010	2011		A mini jet ride with a Buzz Lightyear theme. It was located near Skyways for the 2010 season, and for the 2011 season was located near the Toy Town Train Ride.
Toy Town Train Ride	2010	2011		A train ride with a Disney theme.
Disk-O	2005	2010	Zamperla	A Disko Ride. The ride was removed at the end of the 2010 season and the Dodgem track was moved into the spot where the Disk-O was. The ride itself was exported to Australia after its sale as a travelling ride, but returned to the UK in 2015, situated at Brean Leisure Park with a new look and theme under the name of "Jet Spin".
The Cyclone	2007	2009	Moser Rides	An Extraordinary Bike ride, where the looping gondolas are controlled by the riders' pedals.
Tristar	2009	2009	Fairmatt	A Troika (ride). First traveled the Swedish fairground circuit before being sat at Thorpe Park for ten years as "Calgary Stampede". The ride was lent to the pier by its then-current owner for the 2009 season and has since gone through various owners over the years.
Wild River	1998	2009	Reverchon Industries	A standard 2-drop Log Flume. The ride was removed at the end of 2009 and travelled with M&D Taylor for four seasons before gaining a new permanent home at Tier Prince Fun Park from 2015 until 2022. Currently located at Ocean Beach Pleasure Park.
Extreme	2007	2008	Tivoli UK	An Orbiter (ride) that was lent to the pier by an independent operator.
Power Tower	2002	2006	Moser Rides	A Drop Tower, which was at one point the tallest spring tower ride in Europe.
Paratrooper	1976	2004	Ivan Bennett	A traditional Paratrooper (ride). It was removed at the end of the 2004 Season after 28 years and the Twister was moved to where this was. The ride itself is now owned by an independent operator and travels the UK fairground circuit.
Grand National	2003	2003		A ride where riders ride on horse-themed cars around a guided track.
Wave Rave	1996	2002	K.T. Enterprises	A Miami ride. It was replaced and was part-exchanged for the Rainbow ride. It was sold to Irish operators in 2002, and currently travels on the Dutch fairground circuit as "Party".
It's A Small World	2002	2002	Ronnie Bentley	A Dark Ride which took guests through various scenes of different countries around the world. The ride is unrelated to the Disney ride of the same name, it was similar to former The Greatest Show on Earth ride at Blackpool Pleasure Beach and had teacup styled cars. This ride was relocated from Harbour Park.
Dodgems	1993	2001	Lang Wheels	A traditional Dodgem track which replaced an earlier set. Was later relocated to Symonds Yat Holiday Park with a newer set taking its place.
Jumping Star	1990's	2001	Zamperla	A junior drop tower.
Magic Ring	1990's	2001	Zamperla	A juvenile car ride.
Monster Express	1996	2001	Carpenteria 2000	A small Ghost Train. Sold to an independent operator in 2002 (and again in 2014), and currently travels the UK fairground circuit, although it sat at Funland Tropicana for the 2019 season.
Mini Octopus	unknown	2001	Minari	A junior Octopus ride.
Jungle Train	unknown	2001	Falgas	A juvenile train ride.
Jurassic 3001	1994	2001	ITAL International	A Dark Ride themed on the premise of dinosaurs returning from extinction in the year 3001. (Also referred to as 'Jurassic 3001 A.D.' on ride signage). This was housed on the second floor of the Wheel of Fortune (Now Clarence Pier) arcade. The facade included a robotic triceratops that roared at guests passing by. The ride closed in 2001, but all theming remained on the building until 2012. The vehicles were reused as cars for the Coney Beach Fun Park Ghost Train, while the rest of the ride was sold for scrap. The space where the attraction used to be is now a storage room.
Twister	2001	2001	KT Enterprises	A modern version of a traditional Twist (ride). It was on hire from two independent operators for the 2001 season and was later replaced with a near-identical model.
The Big Wheel	1964	2000	Corbiere	A 56-seat Corbiere Spherical Ferris Wheel. Built on the north-east area of Clarence Pier, between the Dodgems arena and the Carousel. Sold to a private owner, and later sited at Pleasureland Southport in 2005. The former Big Wheel site was then used for the mini-golf course.
Scrambler	1982	2000	Eli Bridge Company	A traditional Twist (ride), it was replaced with a more modern Twister ride. It was sold in 2001 to an Independent operator. Currently, the ride is owned by Richard Cadell, who operates the ride under the name of "The Whirl-A-Round".
Gallopers	1954	1997	Frederick Savage	A traditional Gallopers ride. Built on the north-east side of Clarence Pier, between the Big Wheel and the Ghost Train. Replaced in 1998 with a brand new model with a striped canopy, this ride itself replaced an older Gallopers set. This set itself was relocated to Folly Farm in Wales, and remains there to this day.
Ghost Train	1950	1995	Orton & Spooner	A traditional ghost train (Dark Ride). Built on the north-east end of Clarence Pier. Removed and replaced with the mini-golf course.
Rainbow	1993	1995	HUSS Park Attractions	A Rainbow (ride), previously located at Pleasureland Southport and Blackpool Pleasure Beach. Was part-exchanged for the Wave Rave Miami ride, which replaced it in 1996. What remains of the ride is unknown.
Jets	1966	1993	Lang Wheels	A traditional Jets ride, where riders can control the height of their individual jets. Originally built for the Webber Brothers at Ocean Beach, Rhyl.
Meteor	1980	1993	Cadoxton Engineering	A traditional Round Up (ride). Relocated to Butlin's Minehead
Orbiter	1988	1993	Tivoli UK	An Orbiter (ride), previously located at Ocean Beach, Rhyl. Operated for a couple of seasons on Brighton seafront following its removal from Clarence Pier.
Super Loop	1984	1990s	Larson International	An imported Super Loops (Fire Ball ride.
Astro Glide	1970's	1993	Bennett	A giant slide.
Tip Top	1993	1993	Tivoli UK	A Tip Top/Force 10 ride. Operated on Brighton seafront for a couple of seasons following its removal. Currently travels the U.K. fairground circuit.
Topsy Turvey	1987	1993	Reverchon	A Matterhorn (ride), previously located at Botton's Pleasure Beach Skegness. Upon leaving the park, the ride spent the 1994 season at Tramore Amusement Park in Ireland, followed by 2 seasons on Brighton seafront. The ride now travels in the U.K. fairground circuit.
Dodgems	c.1950s	1992		A traditional Dodgem track Built on the north-central area of Clarence Pier, between the Slide (later, the Meteor) and the Big Wheel. Removed and replaced with the Premier Inn hotel. Replaced with a different track in 1993.
Santa Maria	1985	1988	Anton Schwarzkopf	A rare Santa Maria ride - Schwarzkopf's version of a Pirate Ship (ride). Operated previously in Germany.
Lightning Swirl	1948	1987	R.J. Lakin	A traditional Swirl/Skid ride, where riders control the spin of their car using a pedal. The ride was scrapped at the end of 1987 due to its age.
Satellite		1983	Chance Rides	A traditional Trabant/Satellite ride with basic decoration, imported from the U.S.A.
Walt's Waltzer	1964	1981	Maxwell	A traditional Waltzer ride, replacing an earlier version and itself being replaced with a newer model. The ride later appeared at Ramsgate Amusement Park, Cosgrove Park (Milton Keynes) and since 2011 has been sited at New Brighton, Merseyside.
Steam Yachts		1979	William Cartwright	A traditional Steam Yachts ride, originally built in 1888.
Wild Mouse	1963	1979	Maxwell & Sons	A steel hybrid Wild Mouse roller coaster. Was moved to Funland (Hayling Island) at the end of 1979, and was replaced with "Skyways". Parts of the ride were later used to construct David Pickstone's Wild Mouse at Brean Leisure Park in 1989.
Coronation Ark	1944	1978	R.J. Lakin	A traditional Ark ride, originally built in 1937. Was relocated to Joyland Arcade in Bridlington, where it operated only briefly.
Rodeo Switchback	1947	1972	Frederick Savage	A traditional Gondola Switchback, originally built around 1880. The ride was later sold to Six Flags Great Adventure in the U.S.A., before being re-imported in 1982. The ride is now preserved at Dingles Fairground Heritage Centre.
Calypso	1965	1970	Lang Wheels	A Calypso ride, originally built for showman Side Stocks in 1961. Upon leaving the park the ride went back onto the travelling fair circuit. It was later scrapped.
Moonrocket	1962	1960s	R.J. Lakin & Maxwell	The third of three Moonrocket rides to operate at the park. The ride previously operated under the ownership of Gordon Codona at Redcar Amusement Park, and the Webber Brothers at Ocean Beach, Rhyl. The ride was for sale in 1968, and presumably scrapped.
Octopus	1961		Lusse	A traditional Octopus ride. An identical model of the same ride type operated at the park until 1950.
Rotor	1960	1968	(Rebuilt by Maxwell)	A traditional Rotor (sticky wall) ride, thought to originate from mainland Europe, and refitted by Scottish firm Maxwell. The ride was listed for sale in 1969.
Whirlaround	1959	1965	Edwin Hall	A traditional Twist (ride) - the first of its type in the U.K. It was sold to travelling showman Bernard Cole in 1966, and then later to Jimmy Rogers. More modern models of the same ride type would operate at the park years later.
Chair-O-Plane	1940s	1964	(German)	A traditional Chair-O-Plane ride, replacing a similar model in either 1947 or 1948.
Walt's Waltzer	1959	1963	Maxwell	The first of three Waltzer rides to operate at the park. The ride was named after its owner Walter Shufflebottom. The ride went on to have a long career, with spells at Butlin's Pwllheli, Clacton Pier, Canvey Island Amusement Park and Killarney Springs. It was scrapped in October 2007.
Devil's Chute	1951	1959	Orton & Spooner	An early version of a Wooden Wild Mouse roller coaster. Was replaced by the "Wild Mouse" in 1960.

== Ferris wheel proposals ==
The Solent Eye Ferris wheel was proposed by Billy Manning Ltd for Clarence Pier in 2007. On 17 October, permission for a 130-foot-tall (40 m) wheel was granted, but two days later it was revealed that Portsmouth City Councillors wished the wheel was bigger. As a result, the original plans, which were for a 180-foot-tall (55 m) wheel, were revived and conditional planning permission subsequently granted on 19 December 2007. It was expected to cost £2 million. The plans were scrapped because the wheel was too large.

In 2015, a revived plan for a 110 ft wheel was sent. It was approved and opened in Easter 2016. Despite the popularity of the wheel, it was confirmed in September 2016 that the Solent Wheel will be taken down and sent elsewhere, which was later revealed to be Ireland. In March 2017, Clarence Pier's website was updated to say that the wheel would return in 2018, which it did. The wheel returned for the 2019 and 2020 seasons, until it was confirmed on August 27, 2020 that the wheel will not return for the 2021 season, and was closed for the final time on the 27th of September.
