= Frontierland, Morecambe =

Amusement park in Lancashire, England (1909–1999)

Frontierland Western Theme Park
- Previously known as West End Amusement Park; Fun City; Morecambe Pleasure Park
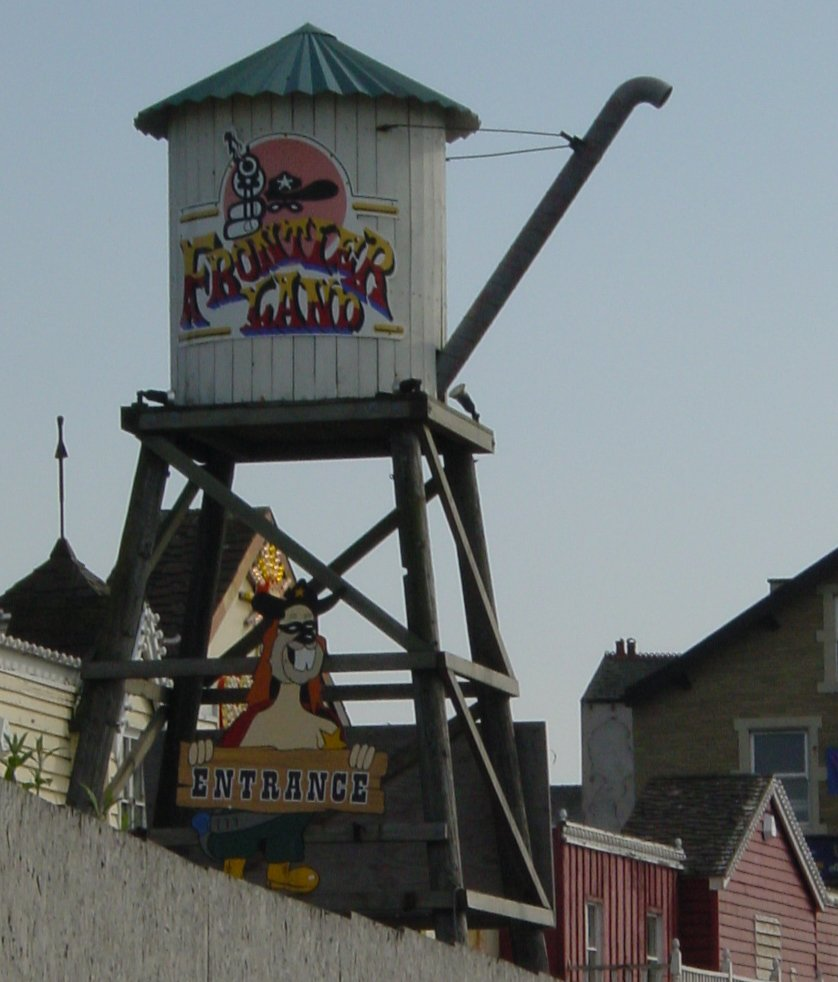
- Interactive map of Frontierland Western Theme Park
- Location: Morecambe, Lancashire, England
- Coordinates: 54.06872°N 2.87601°W
- Opened: March 1909
- Closed: November 7, 1999
- Owner: BPB.Ltd (1909–1999); Morrisons Plc (2001–2009)
- Operating season: No longer operational

Frontierland Western Theme Park was a theme park in Morecambe, Lancashire, England, situated on Marine Road West, which operated from 1906 to 7 November 1999, with a final year consisting of only travelling rides in 2000. Frontierland originally operated as West End Amusement Park, Fun City and Morecambe Pleasure Park from 1906 to 1986 before being transformed into Frontierland for the 1987 season, in an attempt to defeat dwindling visitor numbers.

In 2000, Frontierland was officially closed down by Geoffrey Thompson, managing director of Blackpool Pleasure Beach. All of the rides, excluding the "Polo Tower" and "Log Flume" were demolished or dismantled and sold on. The "Rattler" was moved to the Pleasure Beach, whilst "The Wild Mouse" (later called "Runaway Mine Train" for the new-look Frontierland) and the "Chair-o-Planes" were moved to Pleasureland Southport, which later closed down in 2006.

Unlike Pleasureland, Frontierland was never resurrected and the site remained wasteland until 2007, when three outlet stores were built. These large outlets were positioned at the back of the park, an area that previously featured the "Stampede", "Teacups" and "Parrots" rides.

== History ==
The Thompson family, owners of Blackpool Pleasure Beach, purchased the park in 1936, when it was called West End Amusement Park. The owners, who also owned Pleasureland Southport, which closed in 2006, introduced new rides each year until visitor numbers began to dwindle. A number of tactics were used to save the park, however most failed eventually. Rides such as a 150-foot (46 m) Big Wheel were introduced but were quickly taken down due to neighbour complaints.

In 1986, visitor numbers were at an all-time low so Geoffrey Thompson, owner of the park decided to give the ten-acre site a complete overhaul. This involved turning the park into Frontierland, which it was hoped would cause guests to flock back to Morecambe. This worked for a few years but once again, numbers dropped, so in 1989, the "Sky Ride" was introduced – a cable car system that would allow people to fly over the park and out over the promenade before turning around and going back to the station. The ride was initially a big success and once again, visitors flocked to the park. In 1991, visitor numbers were back down to their low standard and investment was not being put into the park so freely as two previous attempts had backfired.

In 1992, Geoffrey Thompson was about to make his biggest investment ever at Blackpool Pleasure Beach by introducing the 235-foot-tall (72 m) "Pepsi Max Big One", a £12 million hypercoaster. One ride which had stood at Blackpool for over ten years was in the way of these plans. With the construction of the Big One due to start in late 1992, the "Space Tower" was designated for removal. So, in 1993 Frontierland received the "Space Tower", a 150-foot (46 m) gyro tower. The ride was initially going to be placed at the back of the park but with the sponsorship from Polo Mints secured, the ride was positioned on the front. This resulted in a boost in visitor numbers but nowhere near what Blackpool was about to get from opening their new roller coaster.

The "Polo Tower" was the last major investment at Frontierland, however, fans of the park believe that Geoffrey Thompson had no intention of shutting the park down, as in 1993, with the installation of the tower, he signed a contract allowing a telephone mast to be placed at the top of the tower. This contract allowed the company to have their mast on the tower for 20 years, meaning that the "Polo Tower" could not be taken down until the contract expired.

== Demolition ==
Frontierland began to close in 1998, after 92 years of operation. The demolition of the park was due to take three seasons to complete, with the back of the park going first. As the park began to shrink, rides were sold and transported all over the world. However, the demolition of Frontierland was never fully completed as the "Log Flume" and "Polo Tower" remained on site. In 2009, the "Log Flume" was removed whilst the "Polo Tower" continued to remain in situ, albeit with its gondola removed, as its only purpose was to fulfil a contract for the positioning of a mobile phone mast at its peak.

In 1998, when the park began to downsize, the first ride to leave was the "Stampede" roller coaster which had opened at the park in 1988. It was a standard roller coaster found at many parks, and its subsequent location is unknown. The ride was originally from Blackpool Pleasure Beach, where it operated as the "Cyclone". The ride was removed in 1987 to make way for the "Avalanche". Another ride at the top of the park to be removed was the giant "Teacups" which had been at the park for many years. The "Teacups" were extraordinary in both their size and in the fact that the base was entirely made of concrete and was sunk into the floor so that guests could simply walk onto the ride instead of having to step up onto it. The ride was removed in 1998, with the floor being broken up and the cups being moved to Pleasureland Southport where they were never used. They were disposed of in 2006, when Pleasureland closed down, however some remain on the Southport Zoo site hidden in the undergrowth. In 1999, the park began to close the lower section by removing rides such as the "Ghost Train" and "Runaway Mine Train" (originally the "Wild Mouse"), which was later moved to Pleasureland as "King Solomon's Mines". Other ride removals included that of the "Slide", "Train" and various other small attractions. 1999 was also the last year of operation for the "Texas Tornado" wooden roller coaster which had operated for 62 years. The ride remained dormant throughout the last few months of the 1999 season and the first half of the 2000 season until the ride was demolished in late 2000. The year 1999 was the last year that Frontierland operated as a permanent theme park with rides that made it such being demolished, removed or made ‘standing but not operating’.

In 2000, most of the rides had been removed with the exception of the "Texas Tornado", which was due to be demolished, the "Polo Tower", the "Rattler" and the "Log Flume". The "Rattler" was later removed from the park and put into storage. It would not be used again until 2004, when it was introduced as the "Big Apple" at Blackpool Pleasure Beach, but it only stayed there for one season. In 2007, it was introduced at New Pleasureland where it has remained to the present day. Towards the end of the 2000 season, all the rides, shops and facilities such as toilet blocks were removed. One of the last rides to be removed was the "Sky Ride", a cable car system that took riders from the back of the park, across the front and over to a turnaround on the promenade. The current location of this ride is unknown. By the very end of the 2000 season, only the "Polo Tower" and "Log Flume" remained on site, along with a giant pile of rubble. The park's entrance was sealed off using construction fences and the park remained in this state until 2007.

In 2007, the back section of the park became home to three outlet units which had been constructed by Morrisons supermarket. The outlets opened in 2008 and have remained open since. The construction of the outlets meant the removal of the trees which once surrounded the "Texas Tornado" roller coaster. The company behind the development has announced plans to extend the outlet village to the front section of the park which, initially, allowed theme park fans to believe that both the "Polo Tower" and "Log Flume" would reopen as part of the development, and speculation was fuelled even further when scaffolding appeared around the "Polo Tower" mid-2008 but the ride's cabin was removed and the tower was partially refurbished.

In 2009, the "Log Flume" ride, which had survived ten years after the park officially closed down, was removed from the site leaving the "Polo Tower" as the final element of the former theme park, which was finally removed 17 years after the park's closure.

For a few years after closure, there was still a brown tourist sign annotated "Frontierland 7" attached to the posts showing the "Carnforth A6" destination southbound leaving the A6/A601(M) Carnforth Spur roundabout, this was finally covered over with a plain brown patch sometime during 2013 and finally removed during the second half of 2014 – the exact dates of these changes are unknown.

== Rides ==
=== Roller Coasters ===
Name	Opened	Closed	Manufacturer	Description
American Coaster	1984	1999	Supercar	Children's junior coaster. Was sold on to independent operators and renamed "Wild Frontier".
Runaway Mine Train	1961	1999	Blackpool Pleasure Beach	Wooden Wild Mouse coaster. Following Frontierland's closure, the ride was relocated to sister park Pleasureland Southport and renamed as "King Solomon's Mines". Following Pleasureland's closure, it was relocated in-storage again to Dreamland Margate, but was never used at the revived park, being scrapped in 2019.
Texas Tornado	1939	1999	Philadelphia Toboggan Coasters	Wooden Roller Coaster originally designed by Harry Traver for the 1937 Paris World Exposition and moved to the park in 1939. It was renamed from Cyclone to the Texas Tornado in 1987 and was scrapped in 2000.
Stampede	1988	1998		Steel Roller Coaster that was formerly located at sister park Blackpool Pleasure Beach as the "Cyclone". Following Frontierland's closure it was renamed "Roller Coaster" and was loaned to the Billing Aquadrome, Canvey Island Amusement Park and Killarney Springs, and was scrapped following its removal at the latter.
Rattler	1991	2000	Pinfari	Wacky Worm Coaster. It was first used at the 1990 Gateshead Garden Festival before moving to Frontierland. After closure, it saw a brief spell at sister park Blackpool Pleasure Beach before being sold to an independent ride operator and gaining the standard "Big Apple" name.
Figure Eight	1908	1938	William Strickler	The park's first roller coaster, a wooden side-fiction coaster. It was demolished to make way for Cyclone (Texas Tornado).

=== Water Rides ===
Name	Opened	Closed	Manufacturer	Description
Log Flume	1982	1999	Arrow Dynamics	Log Flume attraction. The ride was left standing but not operating following closure, and was demolished completely in 2009.

=== Flat Rides/Other ===
Name	Opened	Closed	Manufacturer	Description
American Scrambler	1983	1999	Eli Bridge Company	Standard Twister ride. Following its removal, it was seen at Canvey Island Amusement Park and Killarney Springs Family Park until being scrapped in 2007 alongside the rest of the attractions at Killarney Springs.
Ghost Train	1970's	1999	Supercar	Ghost Train attraction. It first operated as a travelling ride before its addition to Frontierland. Relocated to Brean Leisure Park following closure in 2000 and renamed as "Terror Castle".
Noah's Ark	1930	1999		Classic fun house attraction. Demolished in 2000.
Polo Tower	1995	1999	Intamin	Observation Tower attraction. It was formerly located at sister park Blackpool Pleasure Beach and was relocated to make room for the Big One. The ride was left standing but not operating for years, with the Cabin being removed in 2008 and the tower itself in 2017.
Rampage Slide	1970's	1999	Bennett	Giant Slide.
Satellite	1998	1999	Chance Rides	Trabant ride relocated from sister park Pleasureland Southport. Scrapped following removal.
Western Carousel	1976	1999	Maxwell	Traditional Carousel attraction. Was formerly located at Ayr Amusement Park in the 1960s. Scrapped following closure.
Haunted Silver Mine	1978	1998		Dark ride themed to a mine. Known as Star Treker before the Frontierland rebranding. Demolished in 2000.
Percolator	1991	1998		Teacups ride. Formerly located at Magic Harbor in the United States. The ride's parts were relocated to Pleasureland Southport following closure but the attraction never reopened.
Waltzer	1998	1998		Traditional Waltzer ride that spent three decades at sister park Pleasureland Southport. It was soon sold to various ride operators in storage, until reopening at Butlin's Skegness in 2012.

- "Funhouse" – demolished in 1999.
- "Sky Ride" – was opened in 1989, removed in 2000.
- "Rattler" – moved to Blackpool Pleasure Beach and later New Pleasureland.
- "Stampede" – was relocated from Blackpool Pleasure Beach as Cyclone opened in 1988. Removed in 1998.
- "Big Wheel" – was opened in 1980 and it was removed in 1982 due to complaints.
- "Tumble Bug"
- "Chair-o-Planes"

== Redevelopment ==
A retail park was built on part of the site consisting of three outlets: Homebase, JJB Sports and Next. The retail park was first proposed in 2001, however did not make it off the drawing board until six years later and opened in 2008.

There are now plans for a Premier Inn and Brewers Fayre pub to replace the Ranch House bar fronting Marine Road West as part of further redevelopment of the site.

As of June 2017, the "Polo Tower" is undergoing demolition to make way for a proposed £17m shopping park on the former Frontierland site.

== See also ==
- Frontierland (Disney themeparks)
- List of amusement parks in the United Kingdom
