= Colin Larkin =

British music writer (born 1949)

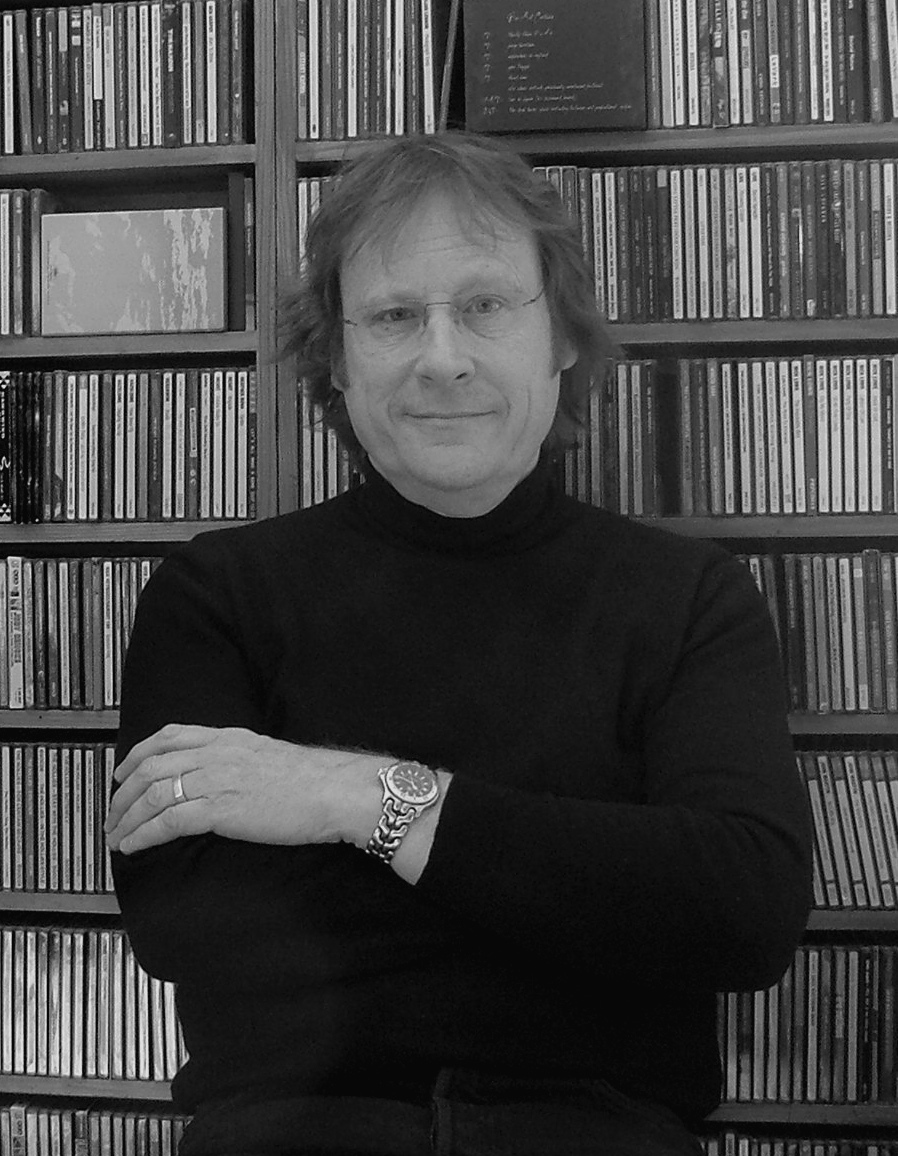
- Born: 1949 (age 76–77); Dagenham, Essex, England
- Education: London College of Printing
- Occupations: Publisher; music writer; entrepreneur
- Known for: Founder of Scorpion Publishing, Square One Publishing
- Website: colinlarkin.com

Colin Larkin (born 1949) is a British publisher and music writer. He founded and was the editor-in-chief of The Encyclopedia of Popular Music. Along with the ten-volume encyclopedia, Larkin also wrote the book All Time Top 1000 Albums, and edited the Guinness Who's Who of Jazz, the Guinness Who's Who of Blues, and the Virgin Encyclopedia of Heavy Rock. He has more than 650,000 copies in print.

== Early life ==
Larkin was born in Dagenham, Essex, (now East London) England. He spent much of his early childhood attending the travelling fair where his father, who worked by day as a plumber for the council, moonlighted on the waltzers to make ends meet. It was in the fairground, against a background of Little Richard on the wind-up 78 rpm turntables, that Larkin acquired his passion for the world of popular music.

Larkin studied at the South East Essex County Technical High School and at the London College of Printing, where he took typography and graphic design.

== Art and publishing ==
Larkin's company Scorpion Publishing published John Gorman's trilogy of Labour history, Banner Bright, To Build Jerusalem and Images of Labour. Music books at this time included Johnny Rogan's Timeless Flight: The Definitive Story of the Byrds and Bob Dylan, His Unreleased Recordings.

== The Encyclopedia of Popular Music ==
In 1989, Larkin formed 'Square One Books to create a multi-volume The Encyclopedia of Popular Music, and to publish music-related books. He published additional music biographies including those on Graham Bond, R.E.M., Eric Clapton, the Byrds and Frank Zappa.

In a pre-internet age, the work required to create an encyclopedia of popular music was considerable. Aided by a team of contributors, a fast-growing library of music magazines, books and the music itself, an eventual 3,000 vinyl singles, 3,500 vinyl albums, 4,500 music biographies and 38,000 CDs, Larkin began compiling the Encyclopedia.

In 1992, the first edition of The Encyclopedia of Popular Music went into print. The Times called it "a work of almost frightening completeness". Musician Jools Holland called it "without question the most useful reference work on popular music".

== Later activities ==
Square One developed their own in-house software using 4th Dimension.

More than 50 separate titles followed the creation of the Encyclopedia's database, and in 1997 Larkin sold Square One Books to American data company Muze. Larkin became full-time editor-in-chief and ran the encyclopedia as a cottage industry, with a team of fewer than ten contributors, who in terms of wordcount were "producing an Agatha Christie novel a month".

From September 2008, Larkin ceased all involvement with Muze Inc. or any of its related companies following the closure of The Encyclopedia of Popular Music as a stand-alone product and his subsequent redundancy. On 15 April 2009, it was announced that most of the assets of Muze Inc. were purchased by Macrovision.

In 2008, Larkin launched a new website whose original inspiration had come from the All Time Top 1000 Albums, initially called 1000Greatest.com. This would later change its name to become the multi-media rating site and iPhone app, btoe.com (Best Things On Earth). Larkin closed down this website in August 2018 and re-directed the content to Musopedia.com. He was CEO and editor-in-chief of Musopedia Ltd. The company was dissolved in 2020.

Larkin wrote the liner notes for the Rolling Stones' curated project Confessin' the Blues.

In November 2020, Larkin released his latest book, Cover Me – The Vintage Art of Pan Books: 1950–1965. His first non-music book, it was a celebration of the classic Pan Books paperbacks, incorporating full-colour reproductions of more than 300 of the original cover artworks. The book was nominated for the H. R. F. Keating Award in 2021 and reached the shortlist final eight. A paperback edition was published in May 2022.

== Bibliography ==
- Larkin, Colin (ed.), Guinness Who's Who of Jazz, Guinness Publishing (UK), 1992.
- Larkin, Colin (ed.), Guinness Who's Who of Sixties Music, Guinness Publishing (UK), 1992.
- Larkin, Colin (ed.), Guinness Who's Who of Indie And New Wave Music, Guinness Publishing (UK), 1992.
- Larkin, Colin (ed.), Guinness Who's Who of Heavy Metal, Guinness Publishing (UK), 1992.
- Larkin, Colin (ed.), Guinness Encyclopedia of Popular Music (1st Edition, 4 Vols), Guinness Publishing 1992.
- Larkin, Colin (ed.), Guinness Encyclopedia of Popular Music Concise Edition, Guinness Publishing 1993.
- Larkin, Colin (ed.), Guinness Who's Who of Seventies Music, Guinness Publishing (UK), 1993.
- Larkin, Colin (ed.), Guinness Who's Who of Folk Music, Guinness Publishing (UK), 1993.
- Larkin, Colin (ed.), Guinness Who's Who of Soul Music, Guinness Publishing (UK), 1993.
- Larkin, Colin (ed.), Guinness Who's Who of Blues, Guinness Publishing (UK), 1993.
- Larkin, Colin (ed.), Guinness Who's Who of Fifties Music, Guinness Publishing (UK), 1993.
- Larkin, Colin (ed.), Guinness Who's Who of Country Music, Guinness Publishing (UK), 1993.
- Larkin, Colin (ed.), Guinness Who's Who of Stage Musicals, Guinness Publishing (UK), 1994.
- Larkin, Colin, All Time Top 1000 Albums, Guinness Publishing (UK), 1994.
- Larkin, Colin (ed.), Guinness Who's Who of Rap, Dance & Techno, Guinness Publishing (UK), 1994.
- Larkin, Colin (ed.), Guinness Who's Who of Film Musicals & Musical Films, Guinness Publishing 1994
- Larkin, Colin (ed.), Guinness Who's Who of Reggae, Guinness Publishing (UK), 1994.
- Larkin, Colin (ed.), Guinness Who's Who of Jazz (2nd Edition), Guinness Publishing (UK), 1995.
- Larkin, Colin (ed.), Guinness Encyclopedia of Popular Music (2nd Edition, 6 Vols), Guinness 1995 (UK),
- Larkin, Colin (ed.), Guinness Who's Who of Indie And New Wave (2nd Edition), Guinness Publishing 1995.
- Larkin, Colin (ed.), Guinness Who's Who of Blues (2nd Edition), Guinness Publishing (UK), 1995.
- Larkin, Colin (ed.), Guinness Who's Who of Heavy Metal (2nd Edition), Guinness Publishing (UK), 1995.
- Larkin, Colin (ed.), The Virgin Encyclopedia of Popular Music, Concise Edition, Virgin Books (UK), 1997.
- Larkin, Colin (ed.), The Virgin Encyclopedia of Seventies Music, Virgin Books (UK), 1997.
- Larkin, Colin (ed.), The Virgin Encyclopedia of Sixties Music, Virgin Books (UK), 1997.
- Larkin, Colin (ed.), The Virgin Encyclopedia of Eighties Music, Virgin Books (UK), 1997.
- Larkin, Colin, (ed), The Virgin Illustrated Encyclopedia of Rock, Virgin Books (UK), 1998, (also published in the US as The Billboard Illustrated Encyclopedia of Rock. US, 1998)
- Larkin, Colin (ed.), The Virgin Encyclopedia of Fifties Music, Virgin Books (UK), 1998.
- Larkin, Colin (ed.), The Virgin Encyclopedia of Indie & New Wave, Virgin Books (UK), 1998.
- Larkin, Colin (ed.), The Virgin Encyclopedia of R&B and Soul, Virgin Books (UK), 1998.
- Larkin, Colin, The Virgin All-Time Top 1000 Albums (2nd Edition), Virgin Books (UK), 1998.
- Larkin, Colin (ed.), The Virgin Encyclopedia of Country Music, Virgin Books (UK), 1998.
- Larkin, Colin (ed.), The Virgin Encyclopedia of Reggae, Virgin Books (UK), 1998.
- Larkin, Colin (ed.), The Virgin Encyclopedia of Stage & Film Musicals, Virgin Books (UK), 1999.
- Larkin, Colin (ed.), The Virgin Encyclopedia of Heavy Rock, Virgin Books (UK), 1999.
- Larkin, Colin (ed.), The Virgin Encyclopedia of Jazz (3rd Edition), Virgin Books (UK), 1999.
- Larkin, Colin, The Virgin All-Time Top 1000 Albums (Pocket Edition), Virgin Books (UK), 1999.
- Larkin, Colin (ed.), The Virgin Encyclopedia of Dance Music, Virgin Books (UK), 1999.
- Larkin, Colin (ed.), The Virgin Encyclopedia of Stage & Film Musicals, Virgin Books (UK), 1999.
- Larkin, Colin (ed.), The Virgin Encyclopedia of Popular Music, Concise (3rd Edition), Virgin Books (UK), 1999.
- Larkin, Colin (ed.), The Encyclopedia of Popular Music (3rd Edition, 8 vols). Macmillan (UK/US) 1999
- Larkin, Colin, All-Time Top 1000 Albums (3rd Edition), Virgin Books (UK), 2000.
- Larkin, Colin (ed.), The Virgin Encyclopedia of Nineties Music, Virgin Books (UK), 2000.
- Larkin, Colin, (ed), The Virgin Illustrated Encyclopedia of Pop & Rock, Virgin Books (UK), 2002, (also published in the US as The Billboard Illustrated Encyclopedia of Pop & Rock. US, 2002).
- Larkin, Colin (ed.), The Virgin Encyclopedia of 60s Music,(3rd Edition), Virgin Books (UK), 2002.
- Larkin, Colin (ed.), The Virgin Encyclopedia of 50s Music, (3rd Edition), Virgin Books (UK), 2002.
- Larkin, Colin (ed.), The Virgin Encyclopedia of 70s Music, (3rd Edition), Virgin Books (UK), 2002.
- Larkin, Colin (ed.), The Virgin Encyclopedia of Popular Music, Concise (4th Edition), Virgin Books (UK), 2002.
- Larkin, Colin (ed.), The Virgin Encyclopedia of 80s Music, (3rd Edition), Virgin Books (UK), 2003.
- Larkin, Colin (ed.), Virgin Encyclopedia of Jazz (4th Edition), Virgin Books (UK), 2004.
- Larkin, Colin (ed.), The Encyclopedia of Popular Music (4th Edition 10 vols) Oxford University Press (UK/US) 2006.
- Larkin, Colin (ed.), The Encyclopedia of Popular Music: Concise 5th Edition, Omnibus Press 2007.
- Larkin, Colin, Cover Me – The Vintage Art of Pan Books: 1950-1965, Telos Publishing, 2020.
