= Infusion (disambiguation) =

Infusion refers to the process of extracting chemical compounds or flavors from plant material in a solvent by allowing the material to remain suspended in the solvent over time.

Infusion may also refer to:

- Infusion therapy, a medical treatment in which liquid substances are delivered through various routes of administration:
  - Intravenous therapy, the infusion of liquid substances directly into a vein for medical purposes
  - Hypodermoclysis, also known as subcutaneous infusion
- Infusion (band), an Australian dance-music act
- Tea infuser, a device in which loose tea leaves are placed for brewing
- Infusion (roller coaster), a roller coaster at Pleasure Beach, Blackpool, UK
