= Battle of Southsea =

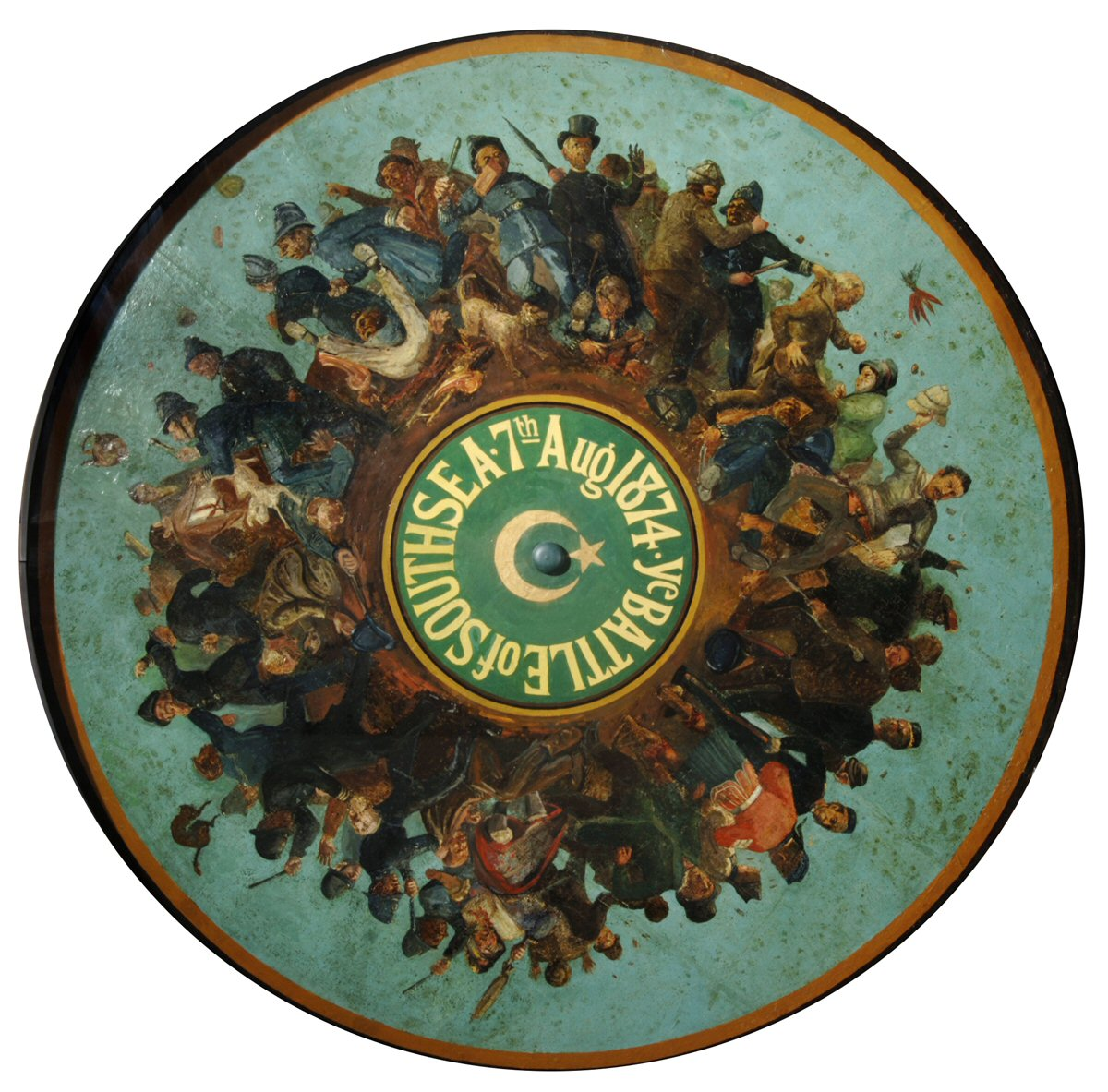
Ye Battle Of Southsea by William Henry Dugan

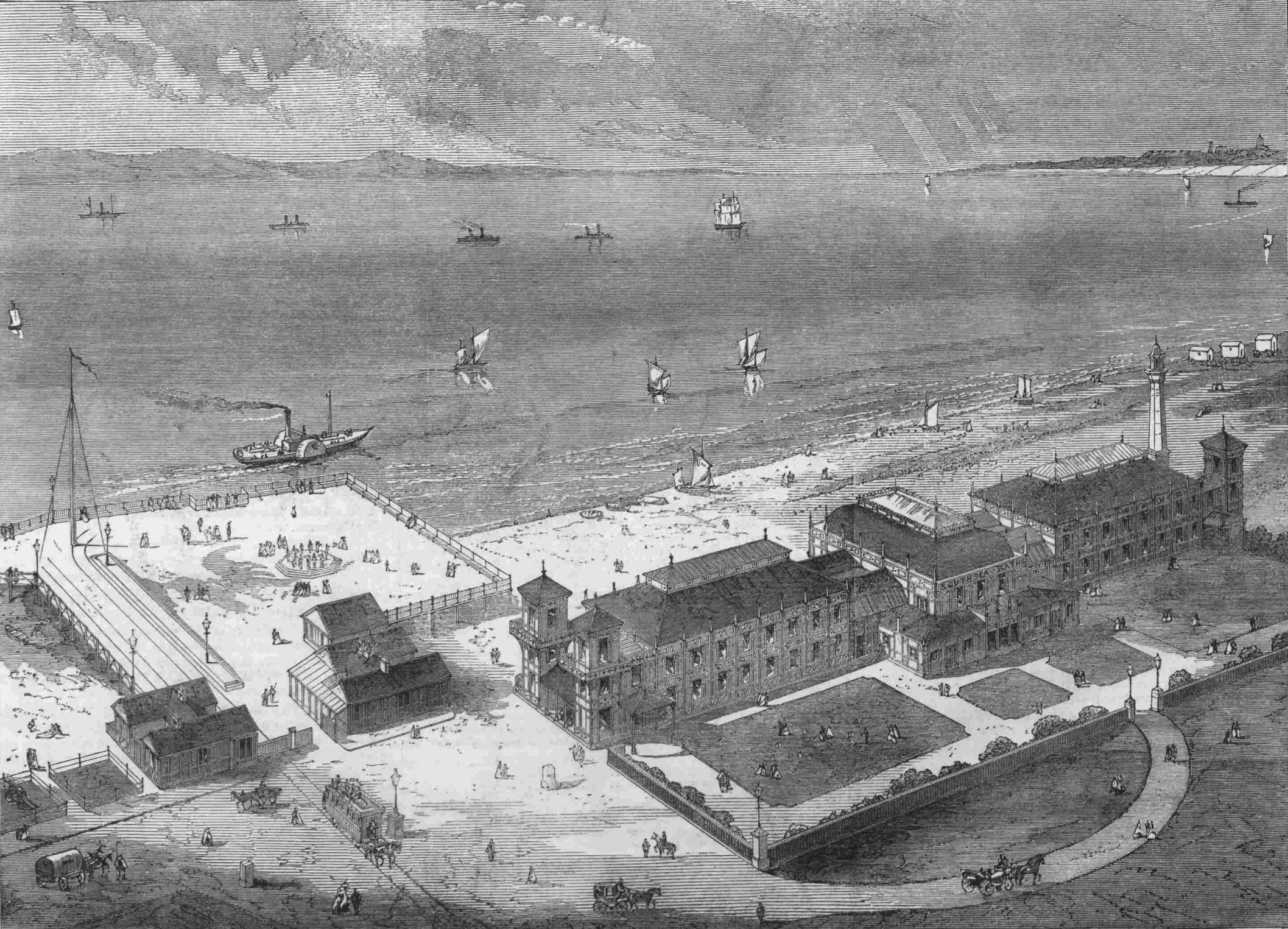
A 1871 view of Clarence Pier (left) and the Assembly Rooms (right).

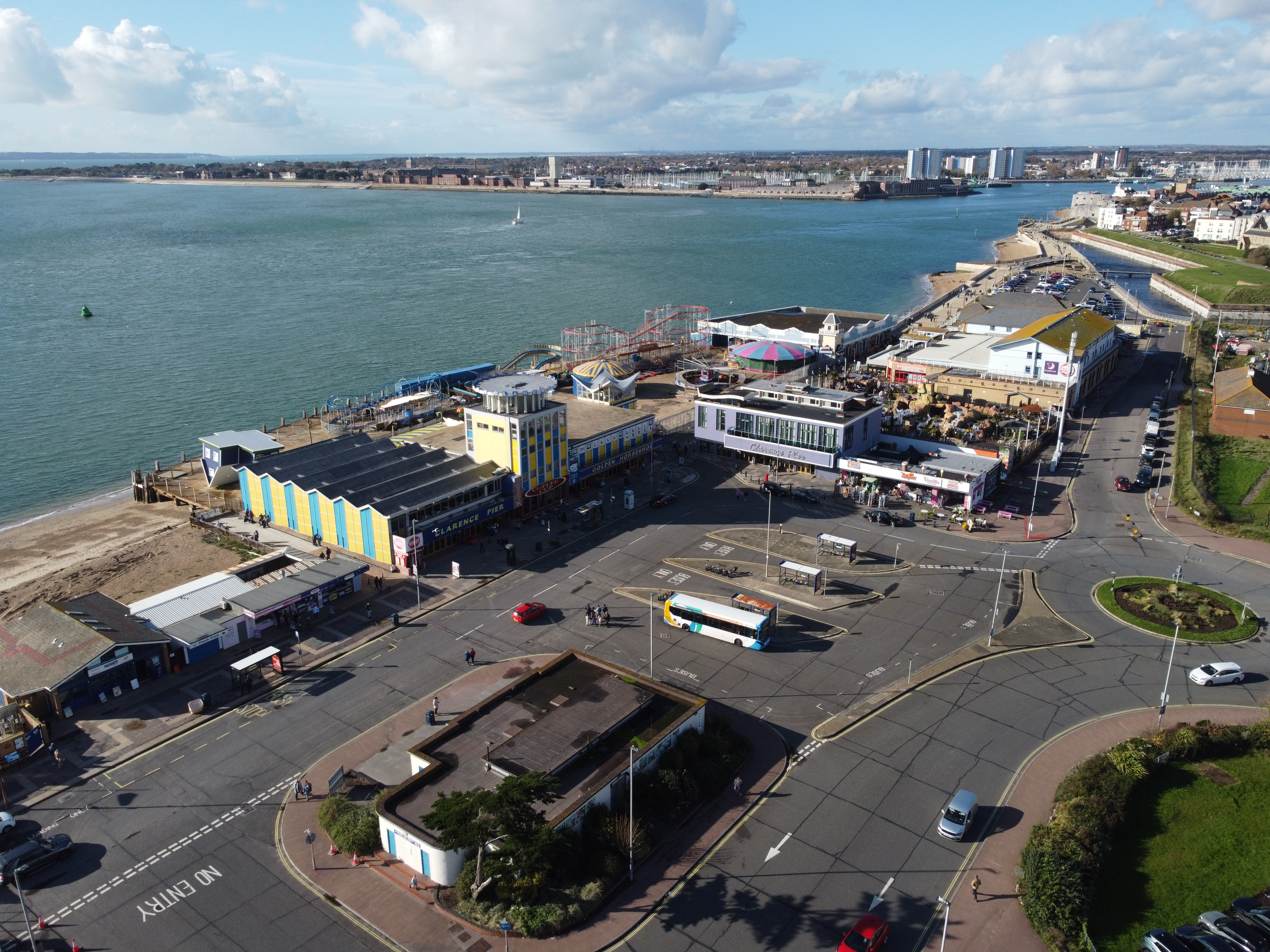
The modern Clarence Pier

The Battle of Southsea was a series of riots over 4 days in August 1874 over access to a section of Southsea beach. Earlier in 1874, the Clarence Pier Company attempted to connect Clarence Pier to the nearby Assembly Rooms effectively closing public access to the beach between the pier and the Hot Walls in Old Portsmouth. Rioting broke out on Southsea Common as the crowd attempted to reopen the route. The Riot Act was eventually invoked with soldiers from the 9th Regiment helping to dispersing the crowd.

== Events ==
Prior to the riots, the beach in front of the Assembly Rooms had been accessible to the public via a route between Clarence Pier and the Assembly Rooms. Most of the directors of Clarence Pier Company were also directors at the Assembly Rooms and planned to combine them into single private premises, which would also give them control of access to that section of beach. The directors claimed they had obtained consent of the Admiralty, the War Office and the Commissioners of Woods and Forests. The main motive of the closure was to increase profits of the Assembly Rooms by charging more genteel customers for access to the beach. There was a long running controversy about working people washing themselves while nude from Southsea Beach, which their customers may wish to avoid.

The directors of the pier ordered a light fence to be erected around the site. When Councillor Manoah Jepps visited the beach on 31st July 1874, he was surprised to see a new fence obstructing access and was insulted by people on the beach who told him to "hold his tongue". The fence was dismantled by Councillor Barnard Charles Miller. On Tuesday 4 August, the pier directors had the fence replaced with a more robust barricade between the pier and the Assembly Rooms. On the same day, Manoah Jepps raised the matter with Mayor George E. Kent at a meeting of the Portsmouth Sanitary Authority. The mayor said he had been assured that would be no barrier would be erected but steps would be taken to remove any such barrier. A number of councillors regarded the route as a public thoroughfare and were concerned the public would take matters into their own hands if any barrier was not immediately removed.

The next evening (Wednesday 5 August), Councillors Manoah Jepps and Barnard Charles Miller held a public meeting on Southsea Common, to explain the situation to a group of several hundred people (one source says five thousand), some armed with pickaxes and shovels. They decided to remove the barricade immediately. Several pier porters stood in front of the barrier armed with sticks. Each side started jeering, taunting and stone throwing. A town councillor was severely struck in the face by a policeman but the policeman was also knocked down. The crowd prevailed but the barrier took an hour to demolish, during which time blows were traded between the crowd and employees of the pier. The debris from the barricade was dragged into the beach by the Hot Walls and burned, with much celebration. The crowd was disciplined and organized, with relatively little violence occurring.

On 6 August, rioting by around five hundred youths damaged the pier. They threw stones at a force of about 30 police.

On 7 August, a large crowd of people assembled on the Common. They were faced by a strong detachment of police. After rioting had started, the police charged the crowd with many rioters and innocent bystanders being injured. The riot raged for more than two hours with nearly every policeman being injured.

On 8 August, a crowd of several thousand assembled again and threatened to burn down the pier. The mayor requested troops from the Governor Sir Hastings Doyle. They both went to the pier and the mayor read the Riot Act, indicating rioters would receive severe punishments including death. Two companies from the 9th Regiment were deployed along the edge of the common, providing an intimidating presence. Policemen, along with some volunteers, dispersed the crowd with little resistance being shown.

== Aftermath ==
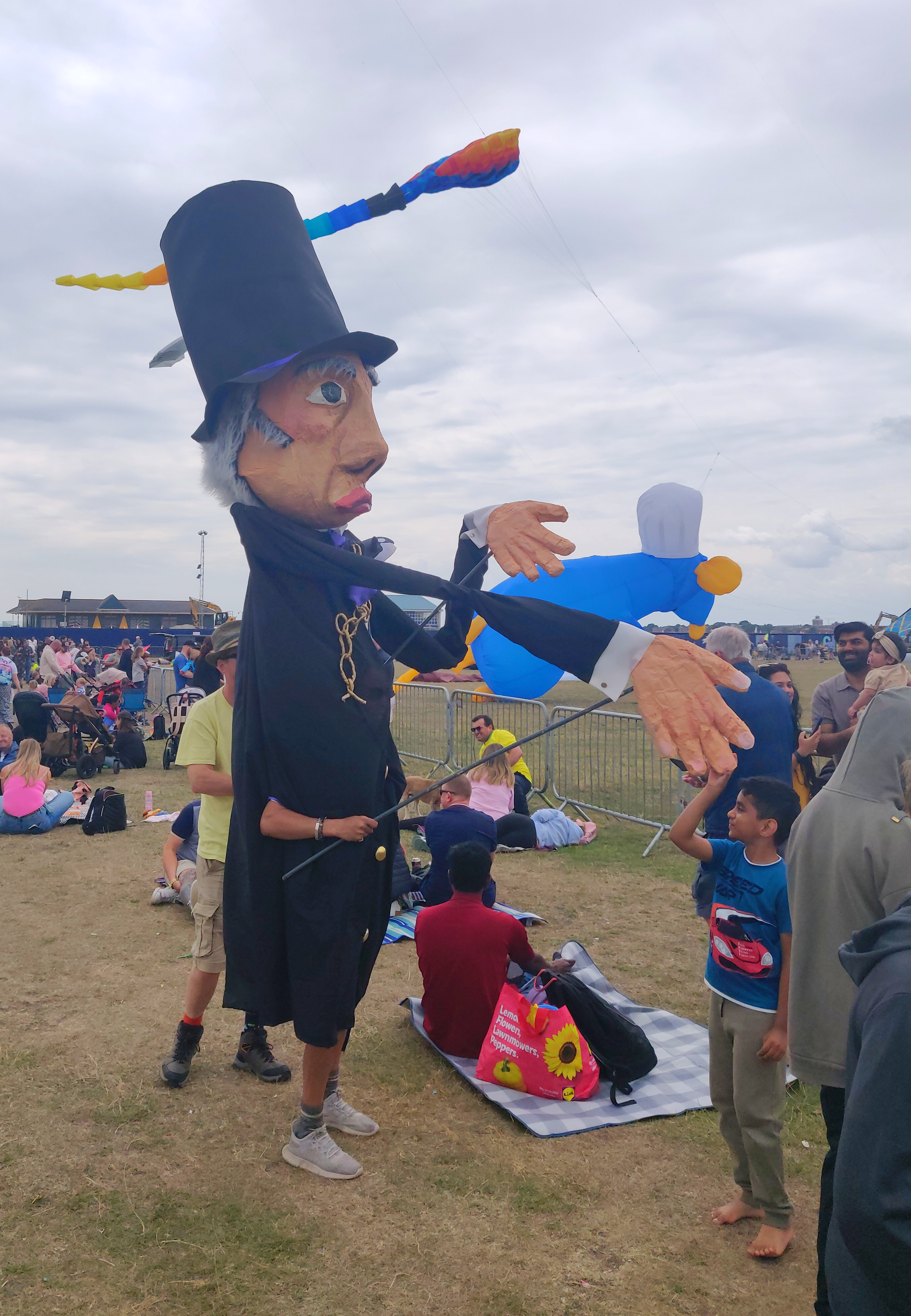
Commemoration giant puppets for the 150th anniversary of the Battle of Southsea

The riots were widely discussed over the next few months across the town. The situation was repeatedly debated by the Town Council, with a loss of confidence motion being passed against the pier directors and excessive use of force by police being hotly debated. Isaac Phillips was sentenced to three months hard labour for assaulting a police officer and threatening several others with an axe, while drunk. The judgement had a blatant conflict of interest as one of the magistrates was director of the pier company and the other was a shareholder, but the Home Office declined to intervene. Prosecutions of alleged instigators Barnard Charles Miller, Manoah Jepps and several others began at the Police Court but charges were withdrawn. According to the company accounts, the damage to the pier was upwards of £500. An investigation by the Watch Committee concluded that the police had shown "patient endurance for a considerable time" but the violence against bystanders that had offered no resistance was not justified.

The plans to block access to be beach were eventually abandoned. John Field describes the battle as a conflict between the local bourgeoisie of Southsea and the working people of industrial Portsmouth, which ended in a compromise of the privately owned pier being extended without blocking public access to the beach.

The battle was immortalized in a mural by the artist E. Dugan (one source says William Henry Dugan) which is now on display at the Portsmouth Museum and Art Gallery.

The Assembly Rooms were destroyed during the Blitz of World War 2.

The 150th anniversary of the battle was commemorated by re-enactments, a documentary and memorial plaques by local artist Pete Codling.
