= Noah's Ark (fun house) =

Amusement park attraction

Noah's Ark is a type of amusement park walk-through attraction built between 1919 and 1936. It features a fun house in the shape of the biblical vessel found in the Genesis flood narrative. As such, most Noah's Arks featured scenes depicting animals and the biblical prophet Noah alongside traditional fun house gags.

== History ==
The first Noah's Ark appeared at Venice Pier (California) in 1919. The attraction was designed and built by Leroy Ramond who sold the manufacturing rights to William Dentzel the following year.

== Noah's Ark today ==
There is only one remaining Noah's Ark in operation at Kennywood Park near Pittsburgh, Pennsylvania. Although there is a Noah's Ark at Blackpool Pleasure Beach in Blackpool, England, it has not been operational since 2008 and now serves as a decorative element at the park entrance.

== Notable installations ==
Location	Opened	Closed	Builder	Notes
(United Kingdom) Blackpool Pleasure Beach	1922	2008	William Strickler	Closed
(United States) Kennywood Amusement Park	1936	–	Philadelphia Toboggan Company	Refurbished in 1969, 1996, 2016
(United States) Venice Pier (California)	1919	1940	Dentzel	First installation
(United Kingdom) Frontierland, Morecambe	1920s	2000		Park demolished 2010
(United States) Steeplechase Park	1923	1929		
(United States) Old Orchard Pier	1929	1969		Destroyed by fire
