= Sonacase =

Ride manufacturer

Sonacase Ltd is a ride manufacturer mainly known for the building of Twist rides. The company was started by English Showman, Monty Hammond, as Leisure Engineering. The representative for American companies are Bates Brothers Amusements, Ohio.

The company also builds Waltzers, these rides are more modern than ones commonly seen at the Fun Fair, these are jointly built with the company A.R.M. Inc., of Wintersville, Ohio.

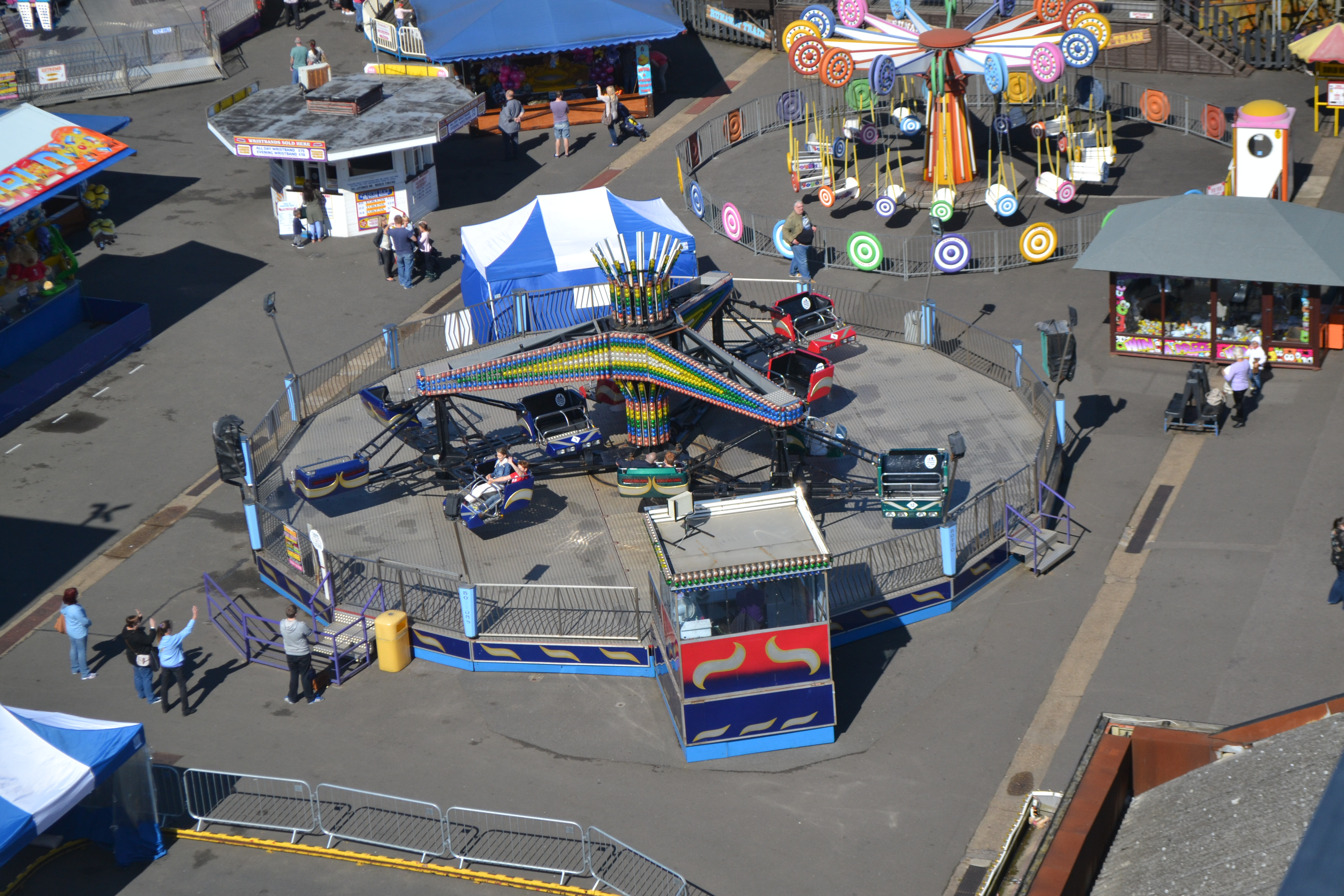
1998 Sonacase Twist at Botton's Pleasure Beach, Skegness, UK
