= Adventure Coast Southport =

Amusement park in Southport, England

- Previously known as Southport Pleasureland
- Interactive map of Adventure Coast Southport
- Location: Southport, Merseyside, England
- Coordinates: 53.64918°N 3.01707°W
- Opened: 1913
- Owner: Norman Wallis
- Slogan: Adventure Awaits
- Operating season: February - November
- Area: Southport, Merseyside, England

Attractions
- Total: 26
- Roller coasters: 1
- Water rides: 2
- Website: https://www.adventurecoastsouthport.co.uk/

Adventure Coast Southport is an amusement park located in Southport, Merseyside, England. The park originally operated from 1913 to 2006 as Pleasureland Theme Park under the ownership of the Blackpool Pleasure Beach company. In 2007, the park re-opened under the ownership of Norman Wallis, operating as Southport Pleasureland until 2024. In 2025, the park rebranded as Adventure Coast Southport.

== Pleasureland (1913–2006) ==
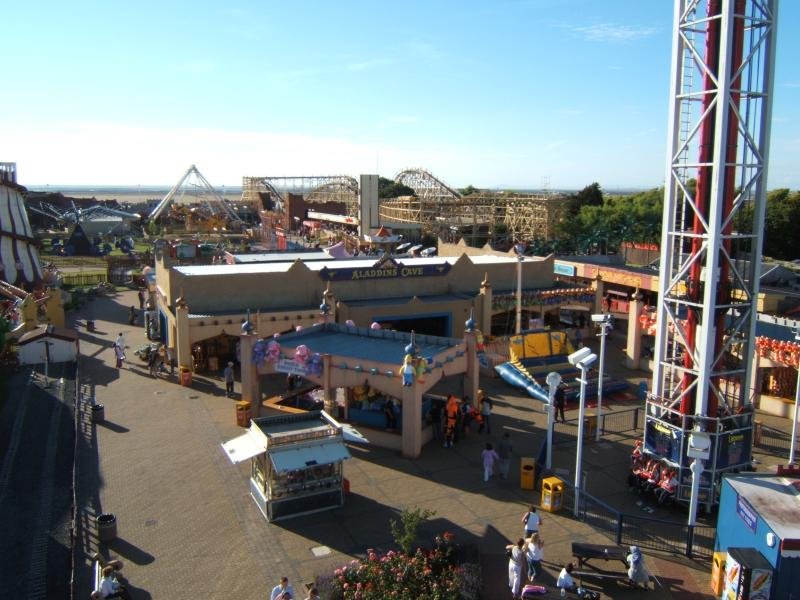
The original Pleasureland before closing

The first Pleasureland had operated since 1913 as a sister amusement park to Blackpool Pleasure Beach. In 2005, the park introduced an entrance fee, which proved unpopular and resulted in a severe downturn in the number of visitors. On 5 September 2006, it closed, due to a claimed lack of return on investments.

A number of rides, including the Traumatizer, were moved to the company's site at Blackpool.

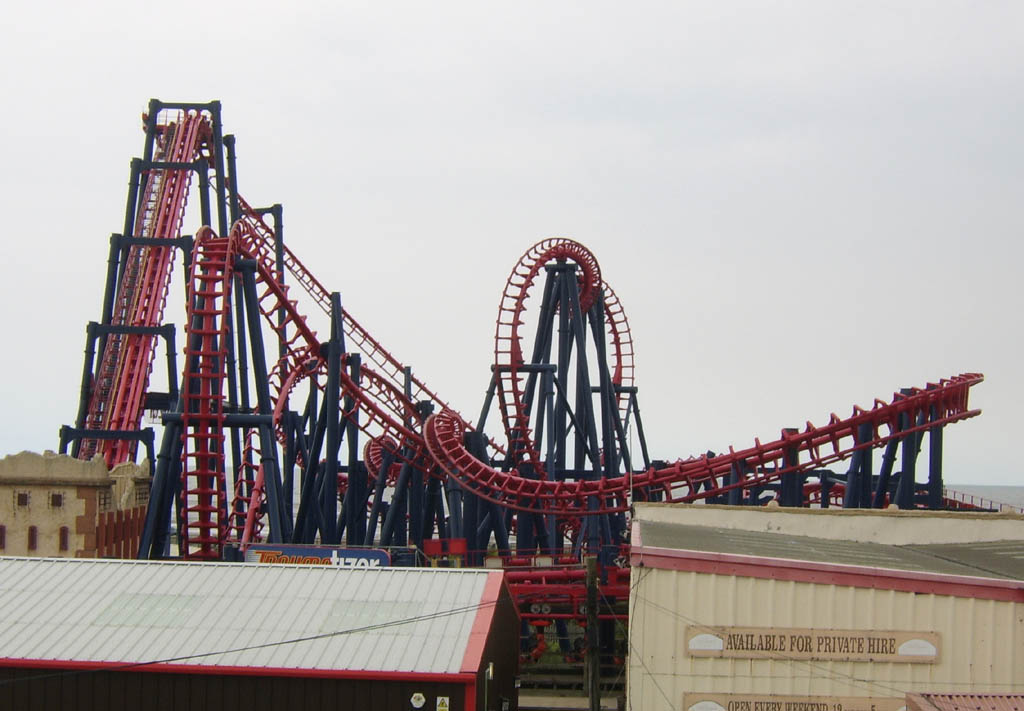
Traumatizer (June 2006)

The park included several historical rides such as the Cyclone wooden rollercoaster; on 14 September 2006, pictures were released onto the Internet of people dismantling the Cyclone, much to the dismay of local residents, Pleasureland fans, and coaster enthusiasts. On 18 September 2006, two protesters climbed to the top of the Cyclone in an attempt to save it. The protest lasted for three hours, after which the protesters came down over police concerns regarding the distraction they posed to passing motorists. There was a petition co-ordinated by a group of coaster enthusiasts to try and save the ride, but this effort also failed. The Cyclone was demolished on 20 November 2006.

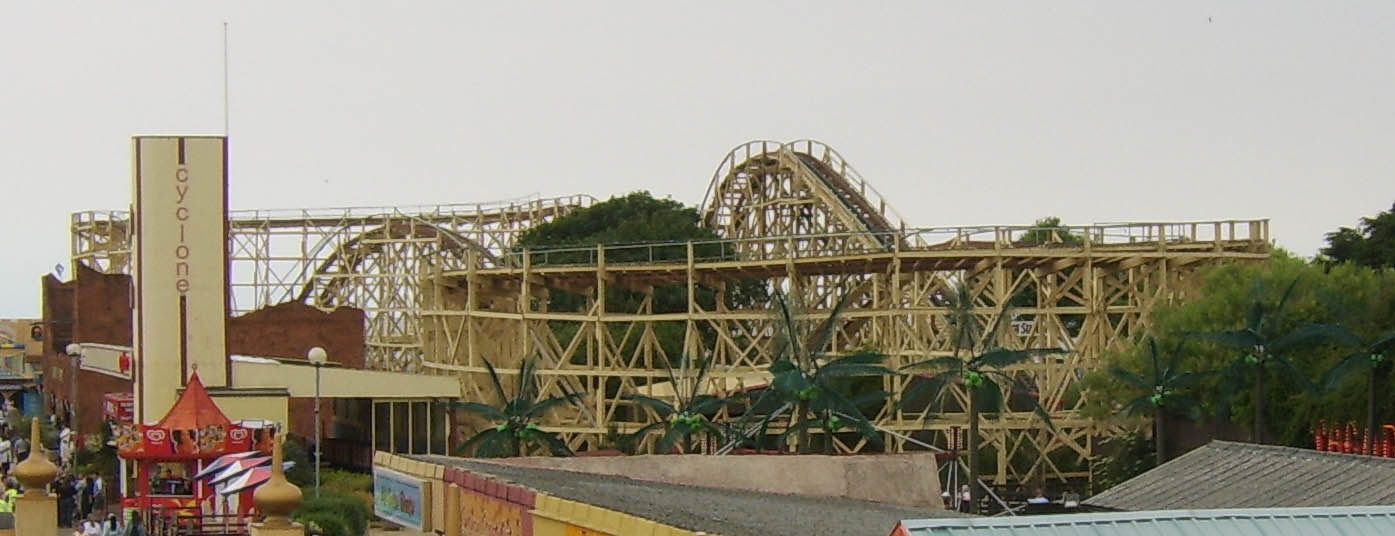
The Cyclone in June 2006

One of the park's unique features was its Funhouse with traditional funhouse attractions such as the Wheel and the Social Mixer. The Funhouse continued to operate independently for several months until its closure on 31 March 2007. Soon after, the funhouse was gutted and parts taken to Blackpool; speculation exists that these will form party of a future heritage fairground museum in Blackpool.

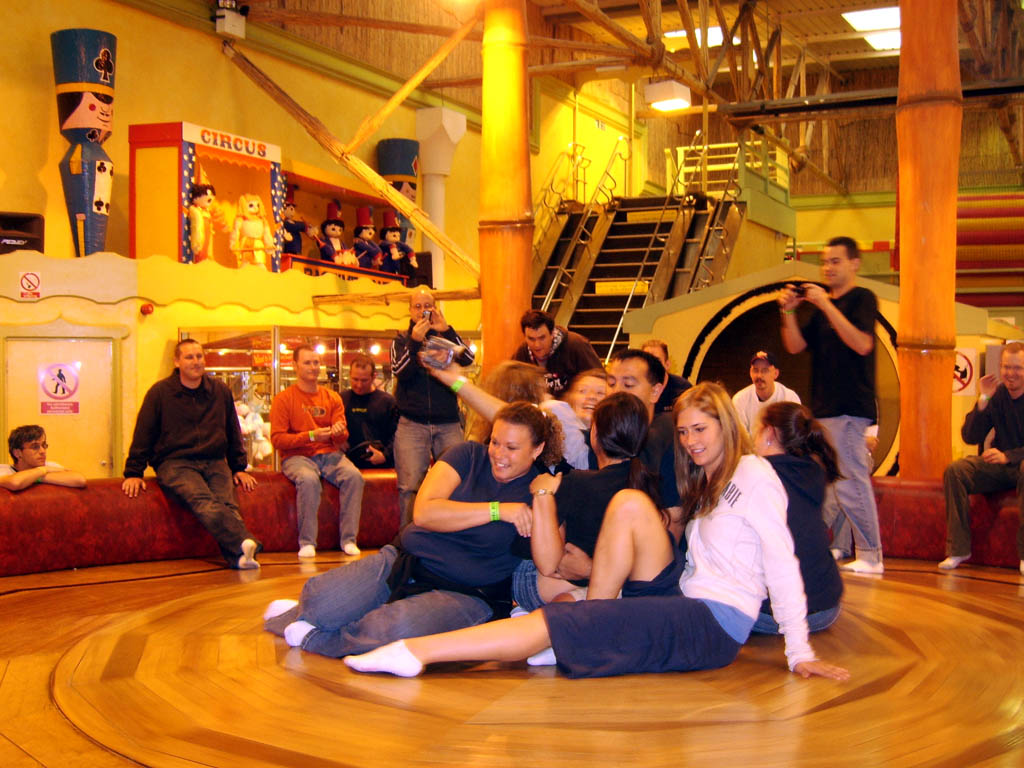
The Funhouse featured attractions no longer found at other amusement parks

Not much is known about the fate of many of the classic rides at Pleasureland, although some were purchased and put into storage for the Dreamland revival project in Margate.

== Southport Pleasureland (2007–future) ==
On 31 May 2007, it was announced that Dreamstorm International were to invest £100 million at the Pleasureland site. Pleasureland was re-opened to the public on 21 July 2007 and renamed New Pleasureland. In June 2007, some of the original Pleasureland buildings were demolished, except for buildings around the perimeter. The site re-opened under new management as scheduled, with a temporary travelling fairground. Then, following a successful summer season, the park was kept open (weekends only) until November 2007, when some demolition of remaining unwanted buildings was carried out and refurbishment of other buildings completed. A Pinfari "Zyklon Loop" rollercoaster was constructed on the site where the Traumatizer once stood and was opened at the start of the 2008 season, named 'Storm'. The Traumatizer was moved to Blackpool Pleasure Beach and opened as the Infusion in 2007.

=== 2008 ===
The Park reopened in 2008 on 21 March. However, on 20 March, Sefton Council announced that a company called Urban Splash had been chosen to develop Southport seafront including the Pleasureland site. Here is a report from BBC News. It was announced in October 2008 that New Pleasureland would return for the 2009/2010 seasons. An official opening schedule has been announced for 2009,

The Traumatizer station building has been demolished. In February 2008, the site of the Cyclone Rollercoaster was landscaped, and part of the old River Caves ride demolished to make room for more rides.

The Park re-opened for the 2008 season on 15 March and rides added for the summer months. Work has also continued on the grounds to make them look more presentable. A Big Top Circus was added during the summer weeks but was removed by its owners after only 2 weeks in the park due to the low number of people visiting New Pleasureland at the start of the summer holiday period. In Summer 2008, a new static ride was opened in the form of a swinging pirate ship. In early 2008, a new roller coaster opened. "Indy's Lost World - The Ride" is a themed indoor roller coaster, based on the latest Indiana Jones' film; Indiana Jones and the Kingdom of the Crystal Skull The roller coaster is situated inside the old Fun House building. In September 2008, it was announced that New Pleasureland will return for the 2009/2010 season. In October 2008, the park's Pinfari Roller Coaster, Storm was removed from the park and sold.

=== 2009 ===
On the evening of 21 April, an arson attack took place, destroying the Lost Dinosaurs of the Sahara (River Caves) and a nearby inflatable attraction. In May 2009, the original Pleasureland Wildcat coaster was bought by Norman Wallis and rebuilt in its original location. The Wildcat opened on 12 August 2009.

=== 2010 ===
The 'Haunted Inn', the only remaining original feature of Pleasureland, was destroyed in a fire on 30 January 2010. The Pleasureland main entrance building, which was built not long before the original park closed in 2006, was also demolished in February 2010. The Casablanca Entertainment complex was repainted white in June 2010 and is awaiting refurbishment.

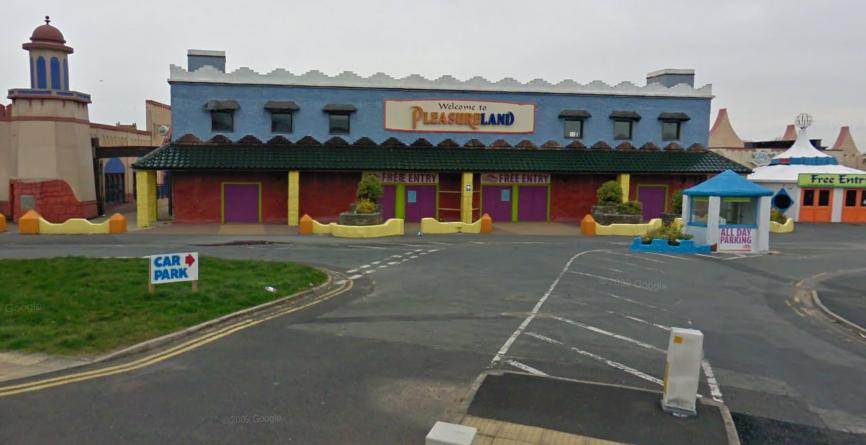
Pleasureland Main Entrance Building in 2007

Indy's Lost World Indoor Roller Coaster was closed early 2010. It is to be replaced with a new Indoor Ghost Train. The ride opened in July 2010.

Battlefield Live Southport has opened on the site of the old Southport Zoo, which is immediately adjacent to Pleasureland. Battlefield Live is an outdoor combat game using guns that fire infra-red beams. The site is accessed via Pleasureland and it opened in August 2010.

=== 2011 ===
The park opened during the Easter Holidays hosting a Monster Truck weekend. A circus was also moved onto the site for the spring season. The previous weekend hosted an Urban Graffiti Art Festival.

=== 2012 ===
The park opened in March, with a new ride called "Air" and a new log flume ride was constructed on the site of the old log flume which was demolished in 2007. A new 'Events Arena' was opened in July with plans to be used as a concert venue.

=== 2013 ===
The park re-opened in March, with three new rides from Camelot Theme Park which closed in 2012.

=== 2014 ===
The park underwent a further rebrand for the 2014 season, with a new website, new logo, new name and new slogan - 'Where memories are made!'. The park also introduced a new electronic token system for its rides, known as the 'Fun Card'. Guests are required to purchase tokens from kiosks and are given a Fun Card with a lanyard to wear. The card can be swiped at any park ride, eliminating the need for paper tokens. Individual tokens cost £1 and all rides have a value from 1 to 4 tokens each. Stations have been allocated around the park to show guests how many tokens remain on their card to use.

=== 2015 ===
The park opened on 28 March with The Crazy Mouse roller coaster amid many other minor additions.

=== 2016 ===
In October 2015, The Crazy Mouse was dismantled to make way for a new yellow looping roller coaster. Construction for the ride was completed in 2016 with the ride's name being "looping coaster". The ride is a pinfari looping coaster.

=== 2017 ===
Construction on looping coaster had been completed

=== 2018 ===
In 2018, a Ferris wheel was added but taken away later that year. Another Ferris wheel, ‘the kingdom in the sky’, was taken down. This wheel was moved from Camelot to Pleasureland in 2013.

=== 2019 ===
In 2019, a go kart track next door to Pleasureland closed down and sold the land to Pleasureland. The fair ground demolished the race track and built a new roller coaster called crash test, a ghost train and the grand canyon was moved here as well as another few rides meant for small children, which were removed later. Also, the magic card system was removed as well as the entrance fee which was good for most people and attracted more guests.

=== 2020 ===
No updates were made to the park due to the COVID-19 virus.

=== 2021 ===
A new pinfari family coaster known as 'The Rocket' was added. This coaster was built in 2001 and has lived in a few parks before being added to Pleasureland.

=== 2022 ===
A new mini golf course with a Viking theme was built by Pleasureland in the site of the former car park. Plans were also announced for a new Zamperla lightning coaster to be put at the west side of the park facing the Irish sea.

=== 2023 ===
A new travelling gyro swing ride was added next to frog hoppers and Remix. The parks flagship rollercoaster ‘looping coaster’ was removed and the site is now empty. The front of the park has become a Viking themed area meaning that ‘Log-flume’ has been rethemed into ‘Loki’s log-flume’ and ‘happy caterpillar’ has been rethemed into ‘Odin’s little dragon’ and there has been a new Viking building has been built. They have also painted the Casablanca brown and that has become part of the Viking area. It now houses 'Alice in Wonderland' dark ride. Midway through the season the area around the ghost train was rethemed to a steam punk area called discovery bay. Three new permanent flat rides were added for the new area called Paradox (a small indoor Miami), Enigma (a gyro-swing ride) and Ultra (a booster ride). New theming was added including shipping containers and industrial machinery.

=== The future ===
Pleasureland has announced plans to expand and alter existing areas of the park. It will be divided into different themed areas. These areas will be a racing themed area, a steampunk themed area, a pirate themed area, a Viking themed area, a beach themed area and a dinosaur themed area. Two of these aress (the Viking area and the steampunk area) has already been built. The majority of rides currently at the park will get removed such as the ghost train and the majority of travelling fair ground rides. Rides such as the frisbee will remain but the decorations will be changed. The building once home to The funhouse and Indie's adventure and is now housing the ghost train will soon be home to ultimate expedition, a steam punk dark ride. The front of the building (which has stayed the same since the funhouse) will be replaced with a new design fitting the new theme. Planning permission has also submitted for a new rollercoaster at the back of the park, near the seafront. The coaster will be a Zamperla Lightning coaster and it will be the park's biggest investment since the park reopened in 2007.

== Current rides ==
Adventure Coast Southport is split into four themed areas, consisting of rides and attractions.

Attraction key	Thrill rides	Family rides	Kids rides	Attractions

=== Viking Landing ===
	Name	Opened	Manufacturer	Description
1	Loki's Log Flume	2012	Reverchon	Two drop log flume. Previously operated at Bayside Fun Park in Bridlington from 2003 to 2011.
2	Odin's Little Dragon Coaster	2016	DAL Amusement Rides	Family rollercoaster 'wacky worm' layout
3	Magic Toy Workshop	Unknown	Unknown	Dark ride
4	Canoes	Unknown	Unknown	Children's paddle boats
5	Freya's Fun House	Unknown	Unknown	Funhouse walkthrough
6	Double Headed Serpent	Unknown	Unknown	Double spiral slide

=== Pirate Cove ===
	Name	Opened	Manufacturer	Description
7	Ghostly Galleon	2024	Metallbau Emmeln	Swinging pirate ship
8	Blackbeard's Falls	2024	Pinfari	Family log flume
9	Flying Dumbos	2017	Bojux	Flying dumbos ride
10	Smuggler's Track	Unknown	Unknown	Children's track ride
11	Dock Fun House	2019	Self-built	Funhouse walkthrough
12	Snake Slide	Unknown	Unknown	Spiral slide
13	Wave Slide	Unknown	Unknown	Racing slide
14	Trampolines	2009	Unknown	Trampolines

=== Cartoon Boardwalk ===
	Name	Opened	Manufacturer	Description
15	Snow Jet	2016	Reverchon	Matterhorn flat ride
16	Twister	2013	Emmo Kreekel	Scrambler flat ride. Previously operated at Loudoun Castle in Scotland from 2004 to 2010.
17	Waltzer	2011	H.P. Jackson	Waltzer flat ride
18	Incredible Dodgems	2008	Reverchon	Traditional bumper cars
19	Toy Set	Unknown	Unknown	Children's flat ride
20	Thingymajig	Unknown	Unknown	Children's flat ride
21	Convoy	2009	Unknown	Children's track ride

=== Steampunk Bay ===
	Name	Opened	Manufacturer	Description
22	Enigma	2023	DAL Amusement Rides	Pendulum flat ride
23	Ultra	2023	DAL Amusement Rides	Booster flat ride
24	Paradox	2023	Unknown	Miami flat ride
25	Flying Chairs	2012	Unknown	Waveswinger ride
26	Ghost Train	2013	W.G.H Transportation Engineering	Traditional ghost train

== Notable Past Rides ==
Opened	Closed	Ride Name	Notes
1937	2006	Cyclone	Wooden rollercoaster, opened on Good Friday 1937. Severely damaged by hurricane in January 1961, but quickly repaired and reopened in time for 1961 season. The station was damaged by fire in 1984 but was immediately rebuilt. Main structure demolished September 2006. Cars taken to Blackpool Pleasure Beach. A taller & faster clone of this ride under the same name can be found at Indias Nicco Park
1978	2006	Wild Cat	Manufactured by Pinfari.
1998	2006	Chaos	Manufactured by Chance Rides. Relocated to Lightwater Valley as "Hornets Nest".
2004	2006	Sand Storm	A Frank Hrubetz & Company Round Up (ride). Operated previously at Blackpool Pleasure Beach from 1969 to 2003 under the names of Astro Swirl and Millennium Bug. Relocated to Dreamland Margate (June 2007).
1975	2006	Skyride	Cable cars manufactured by Ivan Bennett. Relocated to Dreamland Margate (June 2007)
2003	2006	Abdullah's Dilemma	Workings relocated to Dreamland Margate (June 2007)
2013	2015	OMG	Fabbri evolution. Relocated from Camelot Theme Park after it closed in 2012. Manufactured by Fabbri Group
1997	2006	Tidal Wave	A HUSS Park Attractions Pirate Ship (ride). Operated previously at Blackpool Pleasure Beach between 1980 and 1996. Relocated to M&D's Scotland as "Captain's Curse".
2004	2006	Desert Convoy	An I.E. Park children's track ride. Relocated to Knowsley Safari Park.
1999	2006	Traumatizer	Relocated to Blackpool Pleasure Beach and renamed to 'Infusion'.
2000	2006	King Solomon's Mines	Operated previously at Frontierland, Morecambe. Relocated to Dreamland Margate (June 2007).
1987	2006	Big Apple	Operated previously at Magic Harbor in Surfside Beach, North Carolina, USA. Now operated by UK travelling showman Paul Hart. Similar ride currently operates on site. Manufactured by Pinfari.
2002	2006	Lucozade Space Shot	An S&S Worldwide Double Shot (ride). Relocated to Loudoun Castle.
1922	2009	Lost Dinosaurs of the Sahara	Previously named "River Caves". Workings relocated to Dreamland Margate. Building demolished 2009 after an arson attack. Dinosaur figures and central chamber volcano relocated to Blackpool Zoo as part of the Dinosaur exhibit.
1950	2006	Gallopers	Classic galloping horses manufactured by Thomas Walker.
1914	2006	Caterpillar	Relocated to Dreamland Margate.
1991	2006	Chewits Log Flume	Manufactured by Arrow Dynamics. Relocated from Magic Harbour in Surfside Beach, North Carolina, USA. Demolished June 2007.
2006	2006	Chair-O-Planes	Relocated from Frontierland Western Theme Park. Operated at New Pleasureland in 2008.
1994	2005	Water Toboggans	Removed in 2005 and put into storage.
1960s	2006	Marakesh Express	A children's track ride. Manufactured by Lang Wheels.
1955	2007	Fun House	Refurbished in 2000, the Fun House continued to operate after park closure but was later gutted, with rides taken to Blackpool possibly for the rumoured heritage museum as the rides where not found anywhere else. The original building was initially used for Indy's Lost Adventure, then “Ghost Train, and now houses “Port of Discovery”.
1992	2006	Viking Boats	Relocated to Lightwater Valley.
2003	2006	Safari Bugs	Originally operated at Blackpool Pleasure Beach from 1973 to 2002. Relocated to Lightwater Valley.
1913	2004 or 2005	Sultan's Towers	Helter Skelter. Destroyed 2004 or 2005.
1999	2006	Flying Camels	Manufactured by I.E. Park. Operated previously as "Flying Elephants" at Blackpool Pleasure Beach and Magic Harbor in Surfside Beach, North Carolina, USA. Relocated to Lightwater Valley.
1997	2006	Mistral	A Bisch Rocco flying scooters ride. Relocated to Dreamland Margate (June 2007).
2006	2006	Big Wheel	Temporary ride before closure. Relocated to Dreamland Margate
1931	1996	Ghost Train	The park's original ghost train ride. Removed at the end of the 1996 season, and "Journey Into Space" dark ride was converted into a new ghost train.
1997	2006	Tagada	An Eli Bridge Company Twist (ride). Operated previously at Blackpool Pleasure Beach. Similar ride currently operates on site.
1985	2002	Himalaya	A Reverchon Industries Matterhorn (ride).
1949	2010	Haunted Inn	The Haunted Inn (formerly the "Crazy Cottage") was the last remaining part of the old Pleasureland, but was burnt down on 30 January 2010.
1970	2000	"Astroslide"	Sold, now in Tatsminda Park Georgia (Replaced by dodgems)
1930	1977	"Noah's Ark"	Destroyed by fire in September 1977. Built by William Strickler.
1954	2003	"Waltzer"	Numerous Waltzer rides have been on site since 1950s
1976	1990s	"Ski Jump"	A Mack Rides manufactured flying coaster ride. Owned by the Silcock family.
1978	2006	"Ghost Train"	A dark ride with spinning cars, originally called "Journey Into Space". Was transformed into a more traditional ghost train attraction following the scrapping of the park's original 1930s ghost train.
1957	2002	"Hurricane Jets"	Lang Wheels manufactured jets ride. Owned by Helters Ltd. until 1977 when ownership passed to Herbert Silcock (New Modern Products 'jets' fitted to the ride at this time)
1988	1992	"Rok 'N' Rol"	An Allan Herschell Company looper ride. Operated previously at Frontierland, Morecambe.
1976	1982	"Cresta Run"	A forerunner to the "Himalaya". Built and operated by the Jackson family.
1955	1960	"Moonrocket"	A traditional Lakin/Maxwell moonrocket ride.
1938	1955	"Octopus"	A Lusse Octopus (ride). Relocated to Ocean Beach, Rhyl.
1973	1996	"Paratrooper"	An Ivan Bennett lifting paratrooper, operated by the Silcock family.
1983	1983	"Viking"	The park's first Pirate Ship (ride), manufactured by Zierer. Relocated to Coney Beach Pleasure Park.
1986	1987	"Hanseatic"	The park's second Pirate Ship (ride), manufactured by HUSS Park Attractions. Originally owned by Bremen based travelling showman Rudolf Robrahn, then operated at Dreamland Margate.
1985	1987	"Looping Star"	An Anton Schwarzkopf looping star rollercoaster. Operated by Jan DeKoning.
1983	1984	"Mad Mouse"	A wooden wild mouse rollercoaster. Previously operated at Manning's Amusement Park, Felixstowe.
1983	1993	"Meteorite"	A Sam Ward manufactured Round Up (ride). Operated by the Silcock family.
1977	1980	"Scat"	A scat ride manufactured by Fairplace. Relocated to Frontierland, Morecambe.
1950s	2006	"Black Hole"	A traditional swirl/skid ride, built and originally operated by the Jackson family. Converted into a dark ride.
1987	1997	"Satellite"	A Chance Rides trabant/satellite ride. Located just in front of the "Cyclone".
1974	1983	"Tri-Star"	The UK's first Troika (ride). Built by Ivan Bennett and operated by the Silcock family. Relocated to Spanish City, Whitley Bay.
1983	2000s	"Log Runner"	An Ivan Bennett manufactured steel circular water chute. Previously operated at Alton Towers.
1971	1991	"Speedway"	A traditional ark/speedway ride manufactured by Maxwell. Relocated to Marvels Amusement Park, Scarborough and converted to a Waltzer.
1994	2009	"Moroccan Golf"	

== Incidents ==
In 2000, body of murder victim Lynsey Wilson was found at the Pleasureland. She had been decapitated and dismembered by her husband Mitchell Quy, and had her body parts hidden near a roller coaster.

While under the ownership of the Thompson family, two incidents occurred on the Sky-Ride attraction: In April 2004, four people were stranded on the ride due to an electrical fault, while in August 2004, a 59-year-old employee was killed after he became trapped while performing maintenance on the ride. In 2007, the park was fined £95,000 for breaching health and safety laws and was also ordered to pay £50,000 in costs.

== In popular culture ==
The park was a key location in Helen Blakeman's 2003 television film Pleasureland, shown as part of Channel 4's Adult at 14 season.
