= Southport Zoo =

Southport Zoo (Closed 2004)
- Interactive map of Southport Zoo (Closed 2004)
- 53.651°N 3.015°W
- Date closed: 2004
- Location: Southport, Merseyside, England
- Land area: 6 acres (2.4 ha)
- No. of animals: 1,272
- No. of species: 154

Southport Zoo was a 6-acre (2.4 ha) zoological garden in Southport, Merseyside, England run by Carol and Douglas Petrie. Historically within Lancashire, it was located close to the Pleasureland amusement park. It was home to 154 species of wild animals and birds, but closed in 2004.

The animal collection included chimpanzees, lar gibbons, African lions, mandrills, flamingoes, giant tortoises, parrots, black-and-white ruffed lemurs, reptiles, owls and pheasants.

| | Number of species | Number of animals |
|---|---|---|
| Mammals | 33 | 124 |
| Birds | 60 | 193 |
| Reptiles | 31 | 128 |
| Amphibians | 3 | 12 |
| Fishes | 23 | 166 |
| Invertebrates | 4 | 649 |
| Total | 154 | 1272 |

== Closure ==
The council did not allow the Petries to renew the lease on the zoo site and gave the lease to Pleasureland so it could extend the park and create more attractions. In 2005 the zoo site became a paint ball park, before the fairground closed a year later. Pleasureland re-opened shortly afterwards with a new owner and investment and is now thriving with plans to further develop the zoo enclosures area. Some groups claimed that the contract was not renewed for the zoo due to animal rights campaigners and protests creating bad publicity.

When the zoo closed, the Petries moved to Yorkshire taking many animals with them to a new zoo they were creating at Yorkshire Dales Falconry and Conservation Centre in Giggleswick, which had recently closed. The majority of the animals were re-homed and had to be spread across the country, large mammals were rehoused in Cumbria and the primates went to a sanctuary in the Midlands and other animals went to a smaller zoo in Wales. The Petries had wanted to keep the older animals at the new zoo as they had cared for them for many years. Due to campaigning by the Captive Animals Protection Society an application was withdrawn to build new exhibits at the falconry site. It is believed that the animals taken with the family were allowed to stay but not for public show as their zoo licence did not extend to exotic animals.

Ten people lost their jobs when Southport Zoo closed. These included the collection manager and five section keepers (carnivores, paddocks, primates, birds and reptiles) and the estates manager and three members of staff.

== Redevelopment ==
After years of neglect, the site reopened in August 2010 as Battlefield Live Southport, an outdoor combat game using guns that fire infra-red beams. Many of the original buildings and cages have been retained and the area has been redeveloped as a Battlefield Arena for players to play the game within.
