= Infusion (roller coaster) =

Steel roller coaster at Pleasure Beach Resort

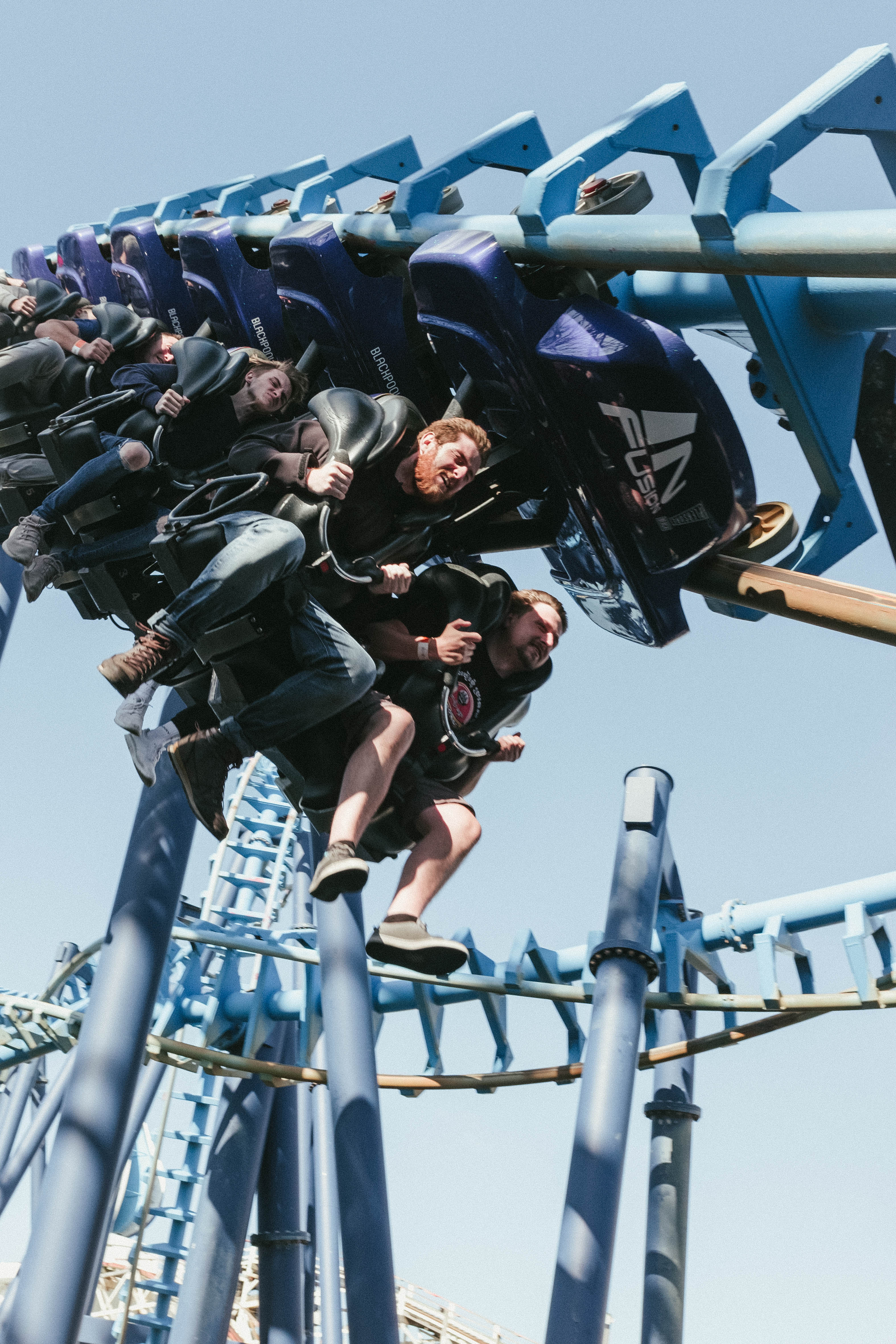

Pleasure Beach Resort
- Coordinates: 53°47′23.6″N 3°03′26.9″W
- Status: Operating
- Opening date: 2 May 2007
- Cost: £8 million
- Infusion at Pleasure Beach Resort at RCDB

Pleasureland Southport
- Name: Traumatizer
- Coordinates: 53°38′54.2″N 3°01′10.3″W
- Status: Removed
- Opening date: 1999
- Closing date: 2006
- Traumatizer at Pleasureland Southport at RCDB

General statistics
- Type: Steel – Inverted
- Manufacturer: Vekoma
- Designer: Vekoma
- Model: Suspended Looping Coaster
- Lift/launch system: Chain lift hill
- Height: 109 ft (33 m)
- Length: 2,260 ft (690 m)
- Speed: 50 mph (80 km/h)
- Inversions: 5
- Duration: 1:45
- Capacity: 832 riders per hour
- G-force: 3.4
- Height restriction: 52–78 in (132–198 cm)
- Trains: 2 trains with 8 cars; riders arranged 2 across in a single row for a total of 16 riders per train

Infusion is an inverted roller coaster at Pleasure Beach Resort (better known as Blackpool Pleasure Beach) in Blackpool, England. It opened on 2 May 2007, and was built by Vekoma.

It is a 689m Standard "Mark 3" model of the Suspended Looping Coaster (SLC), and was the first of its kind to be suspended entirely over water.

== History ==
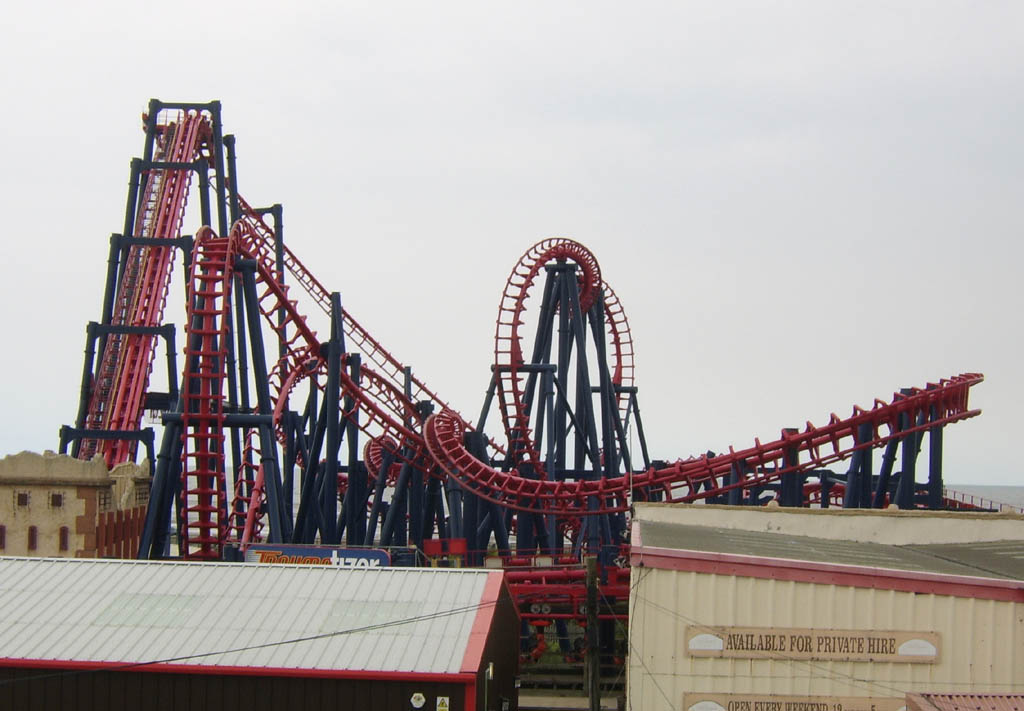
Traumatizer at Pleasureland Southport in 2006

Infusion was initially located at Pleasureland Southport, Pleasure Beach's former sister park, where it was known as "Traumatizer" and sponsored by the soft drink Tizer. It opened at Pleasureland Southport in 1999. When Pleasureland Southport closed in 2006, the ride was moved to Pleasure Beach Resort, where it has operated since 2007. The ride originally featured red track with teal supports, but the track has since been repainted blue. The ride cost a total of £8 million to construct.

== Characteristics ==
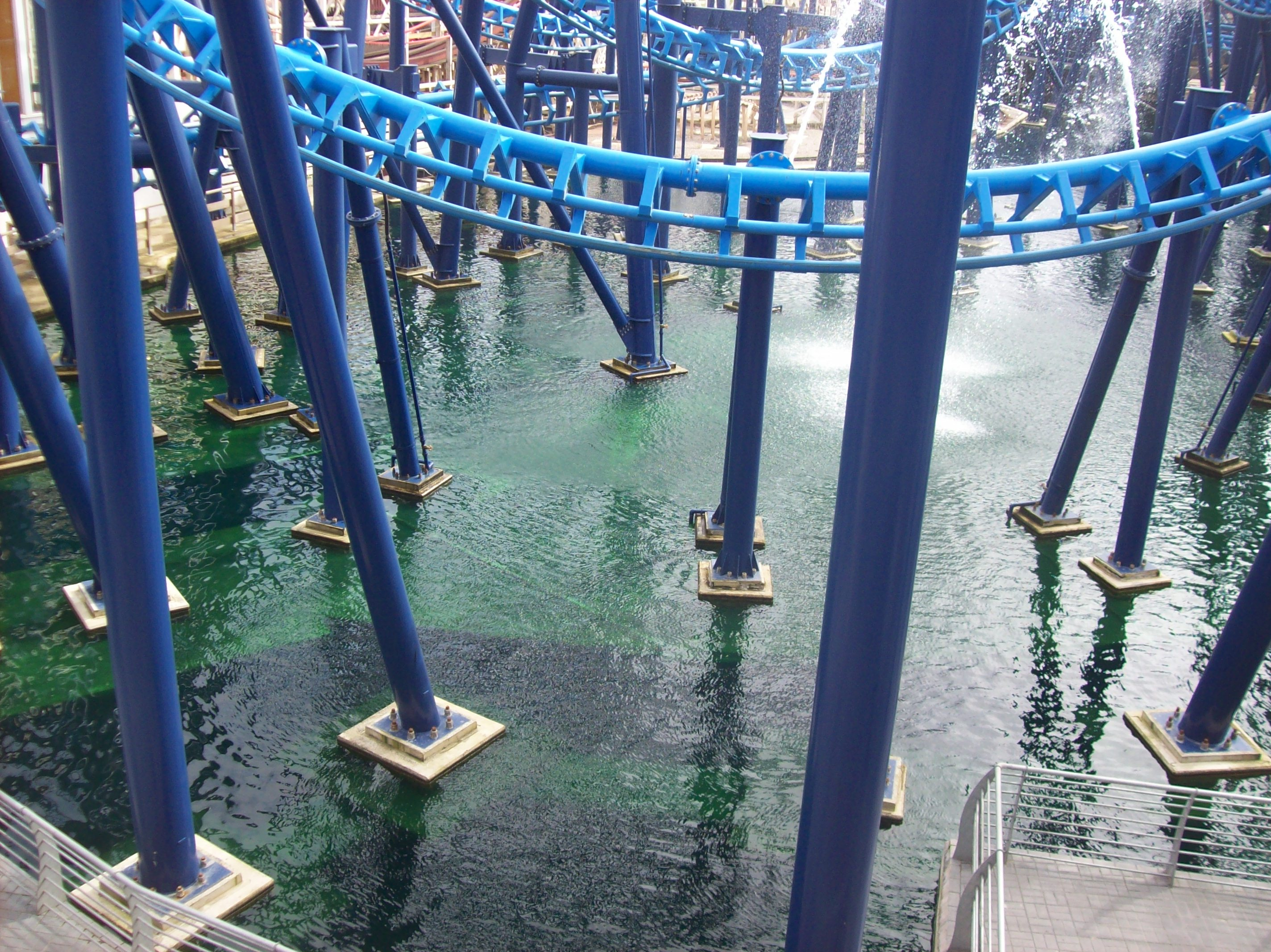
Infusion's support structure

Infusion operates two trains. Each train has eight cars that seat two riders, for a maximum of 16 riders per train. The track is 689 metres (2,260.5 ft) long, and the lift hill is 33 metres (109 ft) tall. The ride reaches top speeds of 80 km/h (50 mph). Infusion has a maximum capacity of 832 riders per hour. The ride subjects riders to a maximum of 3.4 Gs.

== Ride experience ==
Upon dispatch, the train climbs a 33 metre (109 ft) tall lift hill before arching into a steep curved incline. The train rises up into a butterfly loop (two half loops connected by a corkscrew) before pulling upwards into a banked apex. From here, the train drops sharply into a sidewinder (a loop that transitions into a corkscrew). A tight helix follows, providing a near-miss with Big Dipper, before the train straightens out and pulls into a double inline twist. The train subsequently enters a 90 degree turn before pulling downwards and ascending into the brake run. It then returns to the station. A full ride experience of Infusion lasts approximately one minute and 45 seconds.

== In popular culture ==
- The ride was the subject of a large marketing campaign and featured on BBC Newsround, the Daily Star and Daily Express newspapers, and GMTV.
- The ride was featured in a Specsavers advertisement where two elderly people rode the coaster after mistaking the ride's seats for a park bench.
