= Killarney Springs =

Former amusement park in Bude, Cornwall

- Location: Bude, Cornwall, England, United Kingdom
- Coordinates: 50.909595°N 4.477358°W
- Opened: 1990
- Closed: 2006
- Operating season: March – October
- Area: 66 acres (270,000 m^{2})

Attractions
- Total: 20 attractions in
- Roller coasters: 1
- Water rides: 3

Killarney Springs was a leisure park situated near Bude in Cornwall.

The park was established in 1990, and opened for the 1991 summer season. The park had an indoor adventure play centre, a boating lake, a tobogganing slope, go karts, bumper boats and an assault course. In 2005, a new range of attractions were brought to the park with the 'Family Fun Fair', which featured a log flume, a rollercoaster and bumper cars.

The park closed after its 2006 season because of breaches of its planning permission. The recent additions of a roller coaster and log flume had not been approved by North Cornwall District Council. Since the park's closure it has been derelict, with some parts of the site being demolished. The land has since been granted planning permission for a large Huf Haus development.
