= Waltzer =

Flat fairground ride

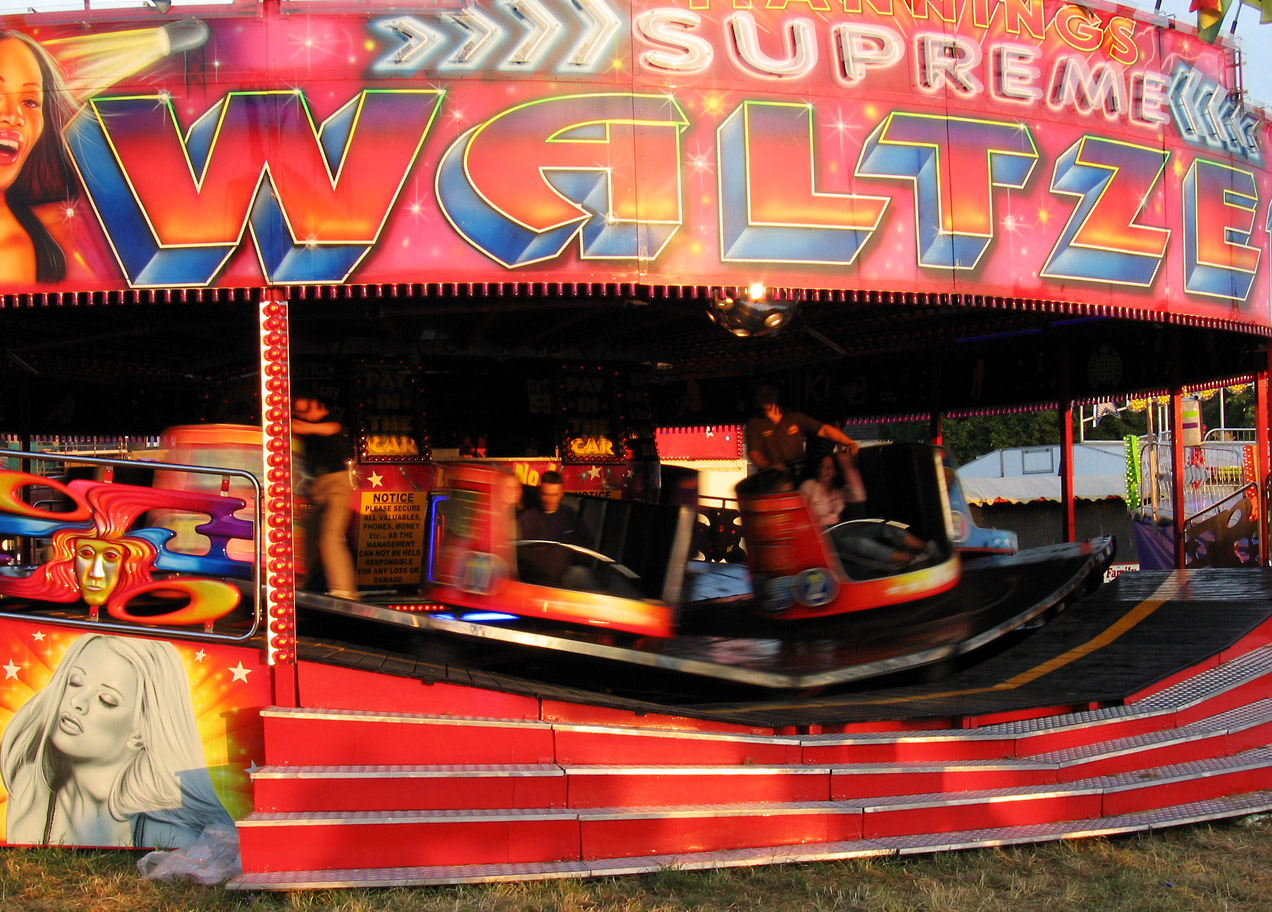
A waltzer in motion, an operator spins the cars

A waltzer is a flat fairground ride that often forms the centrepiece of traditional British and Irish fairs. The ride consists of a number of cars which spin freely while rotating around a central point, in much the same way as a carousel. As the cars revolve, the floor of the ride undulates over a track so that the cars rise and fall as the ride spins. The offset weight of the riders causes each car to rotate. The riders experience varying levels of g-force from the spinning of the car, and the rotation of the ride itself. Because of this, operators will impose height and age restrictions. The ride acts similarly to a Tilt-A-Whirl.

== Operation ==
The operator of the ride sits in the 'paybox' and makes the ride stop and start, and collects money from the staff who typically ride the platform and spin the cars by hand. Riders sit on the bench seat of the car and are held in place by a locking restraining bar.

Traditional Waltzer platforms are surrounded by a gangway, where would-be riders can stand and wait for their turn. This was often an important social aspect of fairs, especially for teenagers. Due to health and safety regulations, this is no longer permitted on British fairs.

In static amusement parks, there are often differences in the operation, such as an organised queue system and ride controls located away from the ride platform.

== History and development ==
A family anecdote says that the Waltzer was invented by Dennis Jefferies of Congleton, Cheshire C1920. He originally named the ride "The Whirligig". The first riders were his nieces, Phyllis and Dolly Booth. The Booth family retain the original drawings to this day. The manufacture of the ride was passed to Jackson's of Congleton

Actual published history states that in about 1881 agricultural engineers Charles Burrell and Percival Everitt registered a design for a Waltzing machine. their intention was to rotate a series of circular platforms travelling around an outer ring creating the movement of the waltz, the machine was never built but 40 years later Herbert Percy Jackson took up the ideas. This former wheelwright and haulage contractor from Congleton set up the Park Amusement company with his brother Thomas and began to design new rides. In 1920 they designed and patented the Waltzing Dolls ride which mechanically simulated the waltz but was never made. They established the Waltzo Company (Manchester) in 1922 to manufacture a simpler waltzing ride that they had patented. Eight years later Thomas Jackson designed the Waltzer in its modern form. His ideas were used by Charles Thurston and R J Larkin to produce the first Waltzer in 1933. Jackson's didn't make a Waltzer until 1949 ( possibly the ride ridden by Phyllis and Dolly Booth) by which time Lakin had made a dozen rides. It is also possible that a variety of 'Noah's Ark ride', a fairground ride first imported from Germany in 1930 aided development Although all early Waltzers were made by Lakins, the ride became strongly associated with the Scottish firm Maxwell and Sons of Musselburgh.

Larkin went on to manufacture 13 machines, Maxwell built approximately 52 rides, Jackson's 30 rides, ARM 5 rides, Keith Emmett 2 and Pollards & Wallis 1 each plus in recent years and still building Robert Porters Fairtrade 25 rides up to 2023 with probably many more to follow. Waltzers originally had 10 cars. However, several Ark rides have been converted into a waltzer, therefore 9 and 11 car variations can be found. Some Waltzer cars had brakes that activate automatically when the safety bar is open. Newer models built by Fairtrade Services have a braking system that stops each car, making them face outwards automatically once the car is stationary.

Waltzers remain popular at travelling and many coastal funfairs, but are less common at large static amusement parks.

Though Blackpool Pleasure Beach operated a Waltzer (The Black Hole) 1986 - 2006 and Drayton Manor Park a Waltzer 1980 - 2010 that was converted into a themed dark ride in 1992. The UK's largest theme park, Alton Towers, hosted a Waltzer as one of several new fairground type additions for the 2021 season.

== See also ==
- Musik Express
- Tilt a Whirl
