= Brean Leisure Park =

Amusement park in Somerset, England

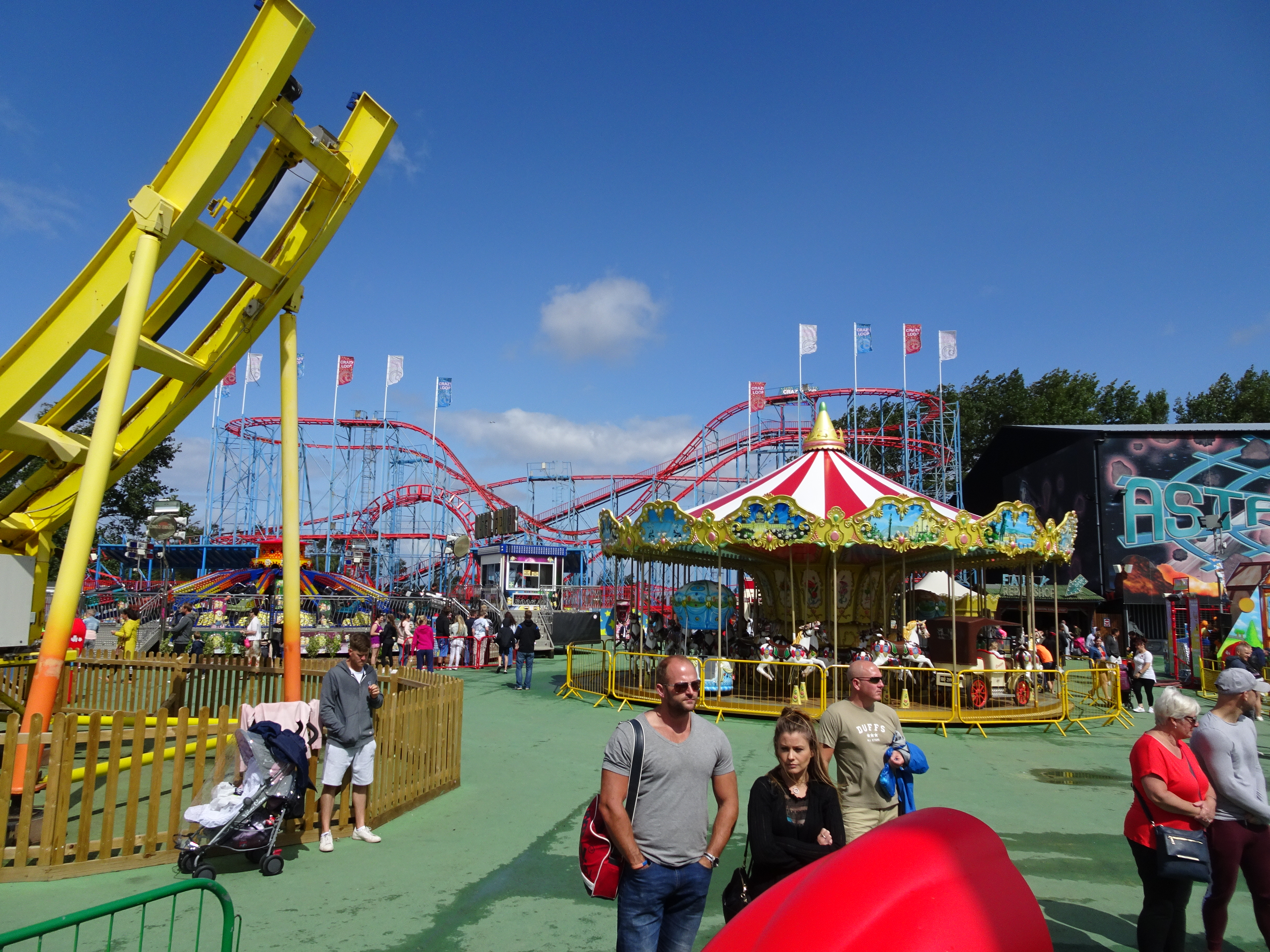
- Interactive map of Brean Leisure Park
- Location: Holiday Resort Unity, Brean, Somerset, England
- Coordinates: 51°17′08″N 3°00′35″W
- Opened: 1946
- Owner: Phil Booth (since July 2014)
- Operating season: March to November
- Attendance: 750,000+ per annum
- Area: 200 acres (80.9 ha)

Attractions
- Total: 30+ (T.B.C.)
- Roller coasters: 4
- Website: www.brean.com

Brean Leisure Park also known as Brean Theme Park, is an amusement park in the coastal resort of Brean, near Burnham-on-Sea, Somerset, England. The park covers an area of 200 acres (80.9 ha).

Brean Leisure Park is open from March to November every year. The park has also been a concert venue for artists such as DJ Casper, Peter Andre, Jason Donovan and The Wurzels. Sky filmed an episode of Brainiac: Science Abuse entitled "Funfair Physics" at the park. An episode of BBC TV series Casualty was also filmed there in 2007 and again 2013. And an episode of CBBC TV series The Sparticle Mystery was filmed of the titled of the episode The FunFair. In 1997 there was location filming for CITV TV series Rosie and Jim of the characters riding a Merry-go-Round.

== History ==
=== 1946–1970s ===
In 1946 Albert and Marie House bought Unity Farm, and for the next 30 years operated it primarily as a dairy farm with a herd of 140 cows. They later supplied the local area with milk that was bottled on the farm.

As far back as 1946, camping was a popular past time. Fry's Chocolate Factory from Bristol pitched large tents on three fields on Unity Farm for a two-week period during the summer so their employees could have a holiday by the seaside such as local areas being Brean, Berrow and Burnham-on-sea. The way Holiday Resort Unity is at present age started from this very stage and it wasn't long before many groups of people including the local Boy's Brigade Troops were coming to Brean to venture and have holidays.

In 1948 planning permission was granted to change the use of some of the farm land to caravans and camping and 20 acres was converted prior for this use. However, during the 1950s and 1960s caravan and camping became a bigger part of Unity Farm (presently known as Holiday Resort Unity) and slowly the number of cows, pigs and sheep decreased.

=== 1970s–1980s ===
During the 1970s and the 1980s the beginnings of Brean Leisure Park were created along with the Mid Somerset Golf Centre which included Target Golf, driving range, pitch and putt and also an 8-hole golf course was opened alongside the other features. Throughout the years additional recreational activities were created which included a swimming pool, donkey derby's and open air markets.

A greyhound racing track was opened on 3 July 1975. The racing was independent (not affiliated to the sports governing body the National Greyhound Racing Club) and was known as a flapping track, which was the nickname given to independent tracks.

Brean Leisure Park as a whole was now attracting a lot of visitors from South Wales, Bristol and Birmingham and in the late 1970s the House family bought out all of the other directors so that they could concentrate on developing leisure and holiday facilities.

The 8 hole golf course was expanded so that it could host 18 holes and Brean Golf Club was created. The course hosted a number of pro and celebrity amateur tournaments as well as becoming a members club and a facility for holiday guests.

In 1980 the complex known today as the 'Tavern' was opened and was previously known as the 'Farmers Tavern' providing a venue for evening family entertainment, functions and weddings. The complex also included an Amusement arcade and Fast Food outlets.

The greyhound track closed on 12 March 1984 and to improve the look of the park a significant landscaping project was undertaken across both Brean Leisure Park and Unity Farm (presently known as Holiday Resort Unity).

=== 1990s ===
Further facilities were added during the 1990s including a river type ride at the Swimming Pool complex (presently known as Brean Splash) and also the addition of two Ten-Pin Bowling lanes at Unity Farm (Holiday Resort Unity) in 1994.

=== 2000–present ===
In 2000 one of the biggest projects that the resort took on since it had first opened its doors began, and this was the RJ's Entertainment complex which was a one million investment in the resort. The American-themed venue replaced Bert's bar and Chicks Roost with a venue with a capacity of approximately 700 people.

In 2008 it became the home of Sooty, Sweep and Soo, when Richard Cadell bought the rights from HIT Entertainment.

On 18 July 2014, the park was sold to a family from Barry Island in South Wales, with the Fun City subsequently renamed Brean Theme Park in 2015.

On 4 February 2026, it was announced that Brean Theme Park had entered administration and is the subject of a winding up order that affects the theme park only. The unity site remains unaffected.

On 10 February 2026, Brean Theme Park issued a statement announcing they would be reopening, despite entering liquidation: "We are working hard behind the scenes and will reopen for the 2026 Summer Season from Easter."

== Current main attractions ==
#	Name	Opened	Manufacturer	Brief Description
1	Bulldog Coaster (2022)	2004	Pinfari	A TL59 looping rollercoaster. Formerly Crazy Loop & located at Pleasure Island Family Theme Park and Flamingo Land Resort. Formerly known as "Shockwave".
2	Astro Storm	2011	Zierer	An enclosed Four Man Bob rollercoaster. Opened 25 July 2011. Previously Operated at Blackpool Pleasure Beach as Space Invader II.
3	Caterpillar Coaster	2001	D.P.V. Rides	An MB28 children's caterpillar rollercoaster.
4	Wipeout	2002	KMG	An afterburner ride. It was voted scariest ride at the park by Brainiac: Science Abuse.
5	Terror Castle	2000	Supercar	A ghost train, Ride system relocated from Frontierland, Morecambe.
6	Ultimate	2006	Sobema	A Matterhorn (ride). Operated at Billing Aquadrome from 1986 to 2005. Previously known as "Hellraiser"
7	X-Factory	2006	KMG	A miami ride, also includes water blasters.
8	Sizzler	2000	P.W.S.	A modern Twist (ride).
9	Waveswinger	2008	Fabbri Group	A waveswinger ride.
10	Jetspin	2015	Zamperla	A Disk'O ride. Previously known as "Disk'O".
11	Dodgems	2003	SBF (track) / Bertazzon (cars)	Previously used cars from C&S until the 2016 season. In 2017 the track were given a brand new set from Bertazzon.
12	Pirate Ship	2023	Guven Amusement Rides (Turkey)	A standard Pirate Boat ride.

== Past rides ==
Opened	Closed	Name	Manufacturer	Description
2004	2004	"Sky Scraper"	Technical Park	A large Ferris Wheel.
2003	2005	"Superbowl"	Keith Emmett	A flipper/Super Bowl ride. Previously operated at Walton Pier.
1990	2002	"Ski Jump"	Maxwell	A flying coaster ride.
1986	1999	"Kansas City"	Hayes Fabrication	A traditional ghost train Dark ride.
2001	2002	"Crazy Frog"	Safeco	A Jump and Smile ride.
1995	2002	"Pod Racer"	Reverchon Industries	A Matterhorn (ride). Moved to Ocean Beach, South Shields.
1996	2002	"Pure Adrenalin"	Fairmatt	The park's first miami ride.
2003	2004	"Over Rider"	Nottingham UK	The park's second miami ride.
1984	1990	"Paratrooper"	Modern Products	The park's first Paratrooper (ride). An upright version.
1991	1994	"Paratrooper"	Harry Steer	The park's second Paratrooper (ride). A lifting version.
1980s	1990s	"Rainbow"	HUSS Park Attractions	A Rainbow (ride).
1998	2001	"Figure Of Eight"	Pinfari	A ST40 powered rollercoaster. Previously operated at Blackpool Pleasure Beach as "Tokaydo Express" from 1980 to 1997.
2002	2006	"Crazy Mouse"	Reverchon Industries	A standard spinning wild mouse rollercoaster.
1988	1997	"Wild Mouse"	Butlins	A hybrid wild mouse rollercoaster, built with parts from identical rollercoasters at Harbour Park at Littlehampton and Funland Hayling Island. This ride was owned and operated by David Pickstone who rode this ride when he was a kid. Previously operated at Harbour Park from 1962 to 1986.
1990s	1998	"Skid"	Hayes Fabrication	A traditional swirl ride. Operated previously at Spanish City, Whitley Bay. Sold to Rainbow Park, Hunstanton.
2013	2014	"Speed Wave"	Mondial	A Top Scan ride that previously operated at Flamingo Park, Hastings between 2008 and 2012.
1980s	1999	"Twist"	Ivan Bennett	The park's original Twist (ride). Replaced by "Sizzler".
1984	1984	"Waltzer"	Lakin	The park's first Waltzer ride.
1985	2002	"Waltzer"		The park's second Waltzer ride.
2006	2006	"Waltzer"	Maxwell	The park's third Waltzer ride. Previously operated at Codona's Amusement Park.
2007	2014	"Waltzer"	A.R.M.	The park's fourth Waltzer ride. Previously operated at Flamingo Land Resort between 1991 and 2006.
1984	1985	"Gallopers"	Allchin	The park's first set of gallopers. Previously operated at Allday's Amusements, Barmouth.
1993	1998	"Gallopers"	Savage	The park's second set of gallopers. Previously operated at Woburn Abbey.
	2005	"Gallopers"	Mardi Gras	The park's third set of gallopers.
2005	2011	"Xtreme"	KMG	The park's first Booster ride. Was sold after the 2011 season. Previous owners after Brean include Frederick Leraitra, France (October 2011), Bertie Holland (November 2013), Perrin Matthews (December 2016), Samantha Matthews (February 2024), Austin Holland (August 2024. The ride is owned by William Percival & Joseph Pullen Jnr as of September 2025.
2015	2015	"Star Flyer"	AK Rides	A vertical swing ride. This was a guest ride for the 2015 season on loan from showman Daniel Coles.
2005	2015	"Frisbee"	Ivan Bennett	A trabant/satellite ride. The ride was sold to Irish showman Duane McFadden after the 2015 season.
2018	2018	"Air Maxx"	Technical Park	A Loop Fighter ride. Guest ride for the 2018 season on loan from the ride's owner Charles James. The ride would later be a guest attraction at Fantasy Island for the 2019 season before Charles sold the ride to the Mellors Group the same year.
2012	2022	"Xtreme"	KMG	The park's second booster ride. The tallest ride in the park. Replacing the almost identical model built in March 2005 which can be found under William Percival & Joseph Pullen Jnr's ownership. This ride was removed before the 2023 season after being sold to UK showman Perrin Print and now travelling as "StratosFear".
2007	2024	"Magic Mouse"	Reverchon Industries	A standard spinning wild mouse rollercoaster. It was known as "Crazy Mouse" until the start of the 2007 season. The ride was removed from the park during the 2024 season after being sold to Abie Danter of Danter Attractions.
2005	2024	"Disco Fever"	P.W.S.	A Jump and Smile ride. Was removed during the 2024 season after being sold to UK showman Jameson Weston.
2001	2025	"Wild Water"	Reverchon Industries	A Log flume (ride). Was removed during the 2025 season after being sold to Abie Danter of Danter Attractions.
2022	2025	"Orbiter"	Tivoli MfG Ltd	An Orbiter ride. Purchased from UK Showman Edward Furborough. The ride was removed before the start of the 2026 season after being sold to showman James Rogers.

== Gallery ==
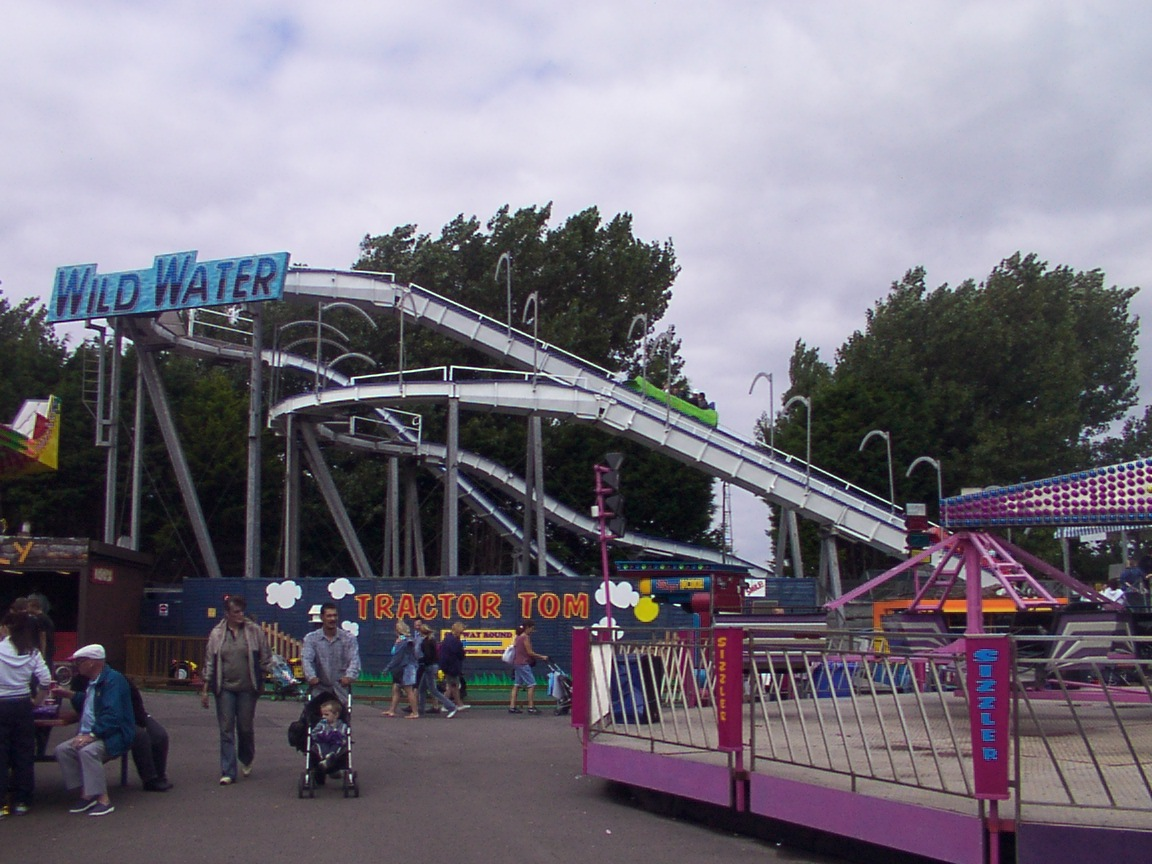

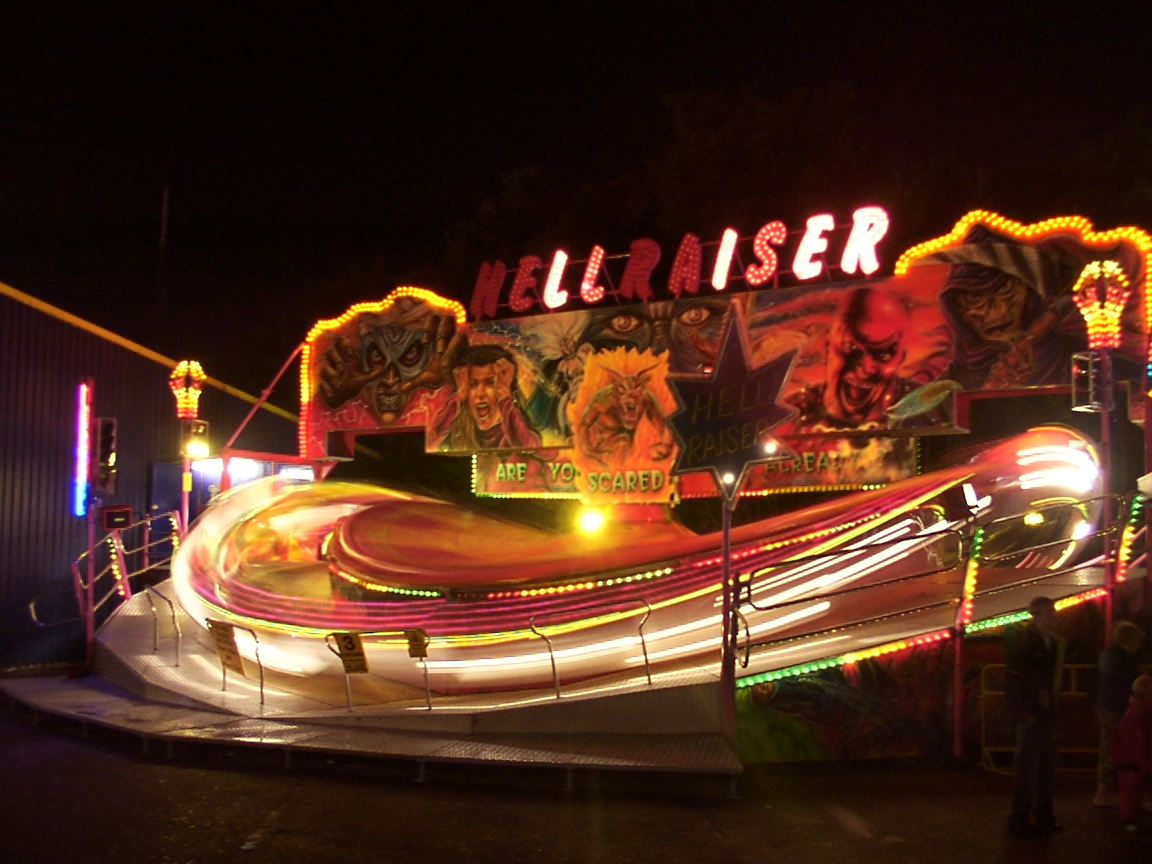

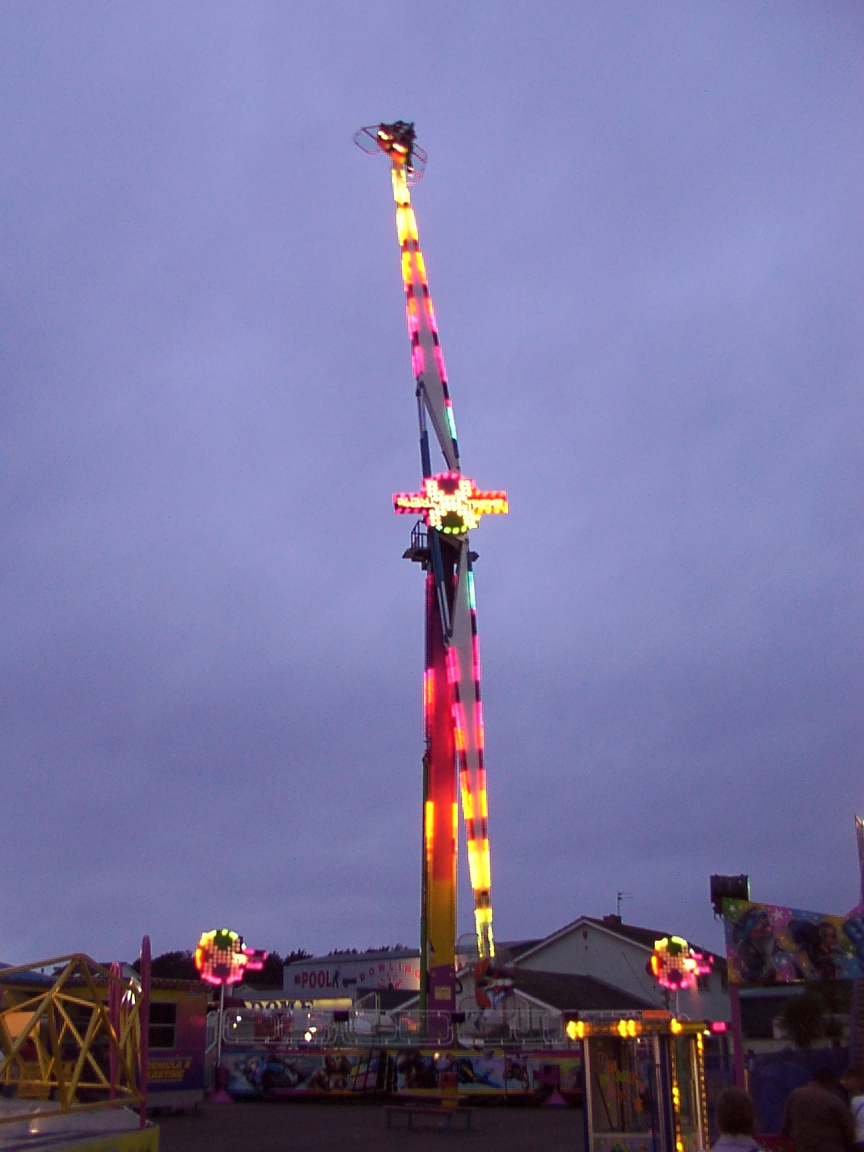

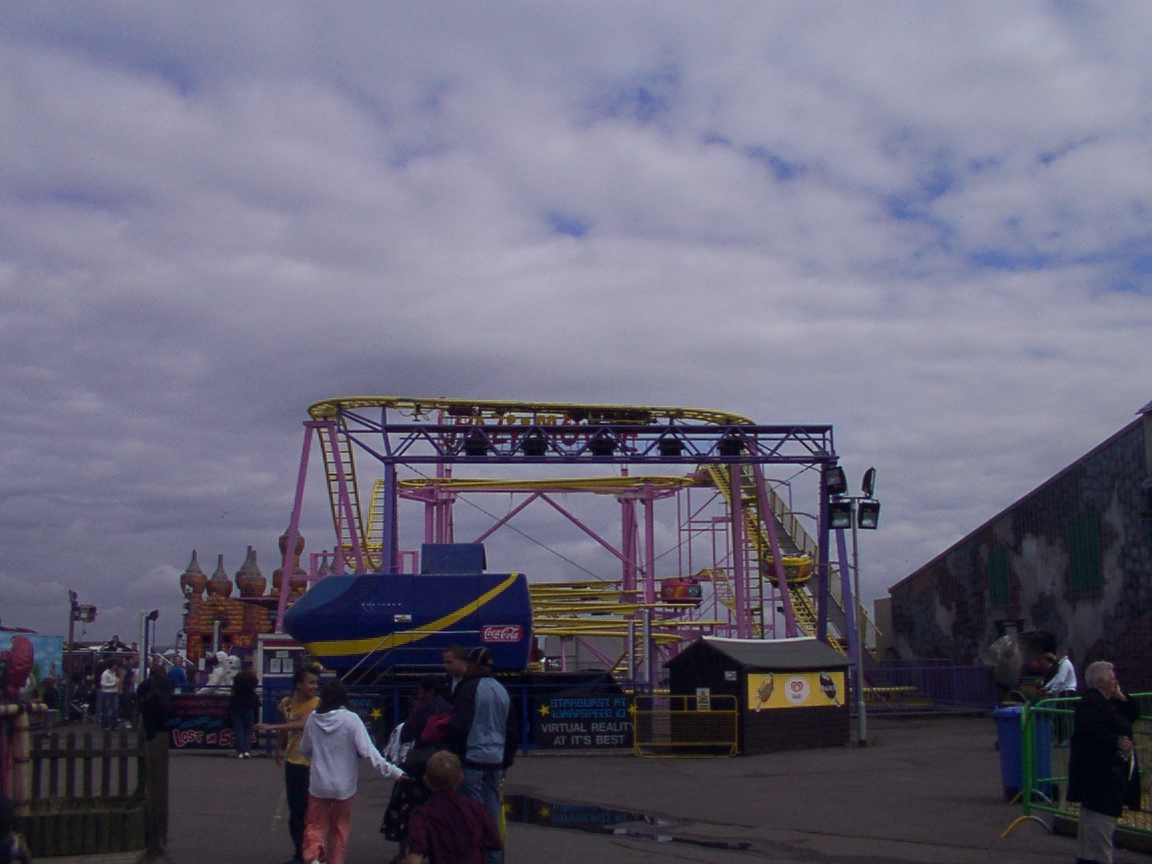

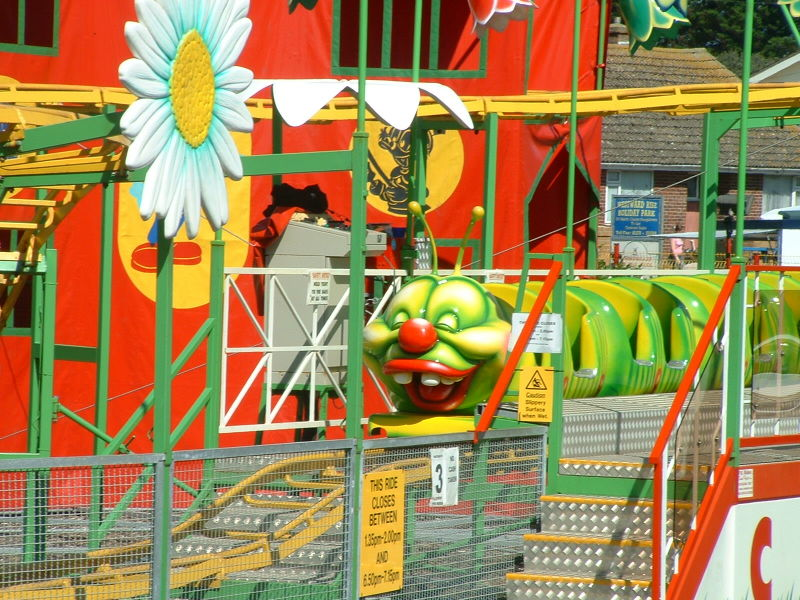

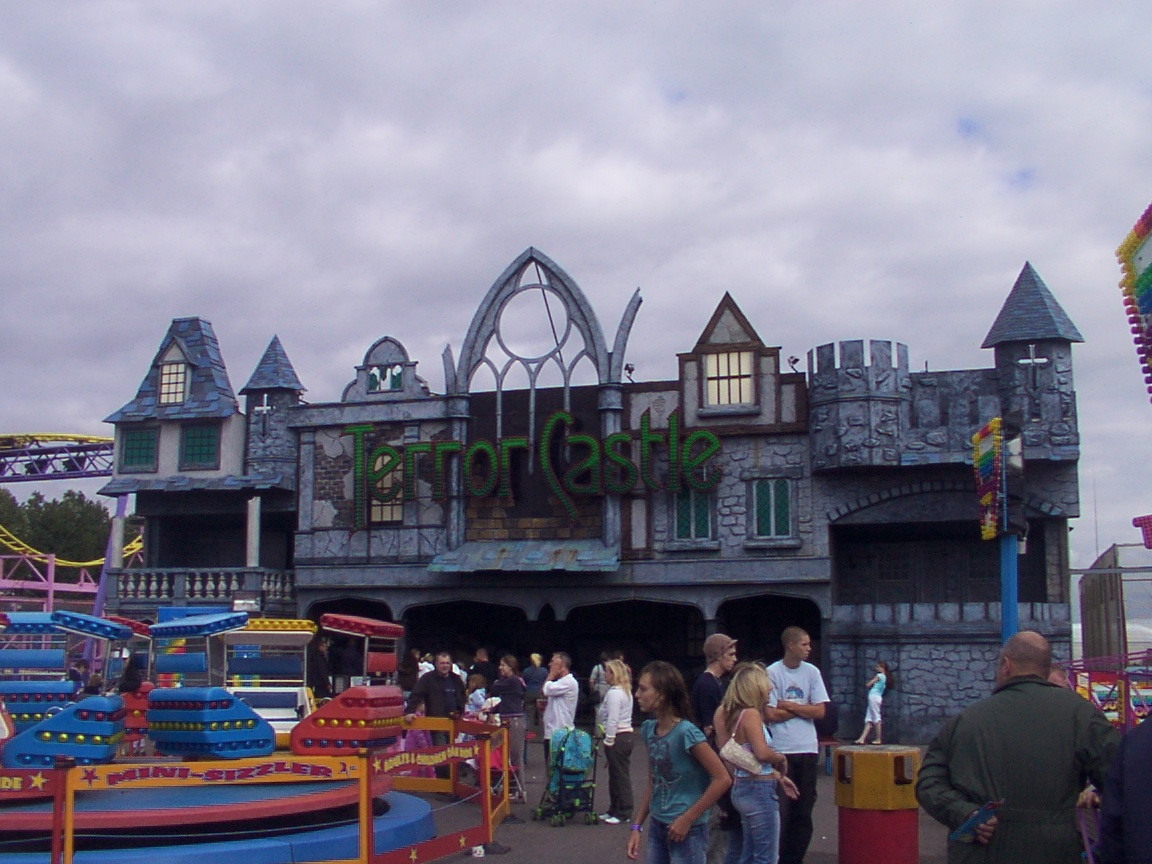

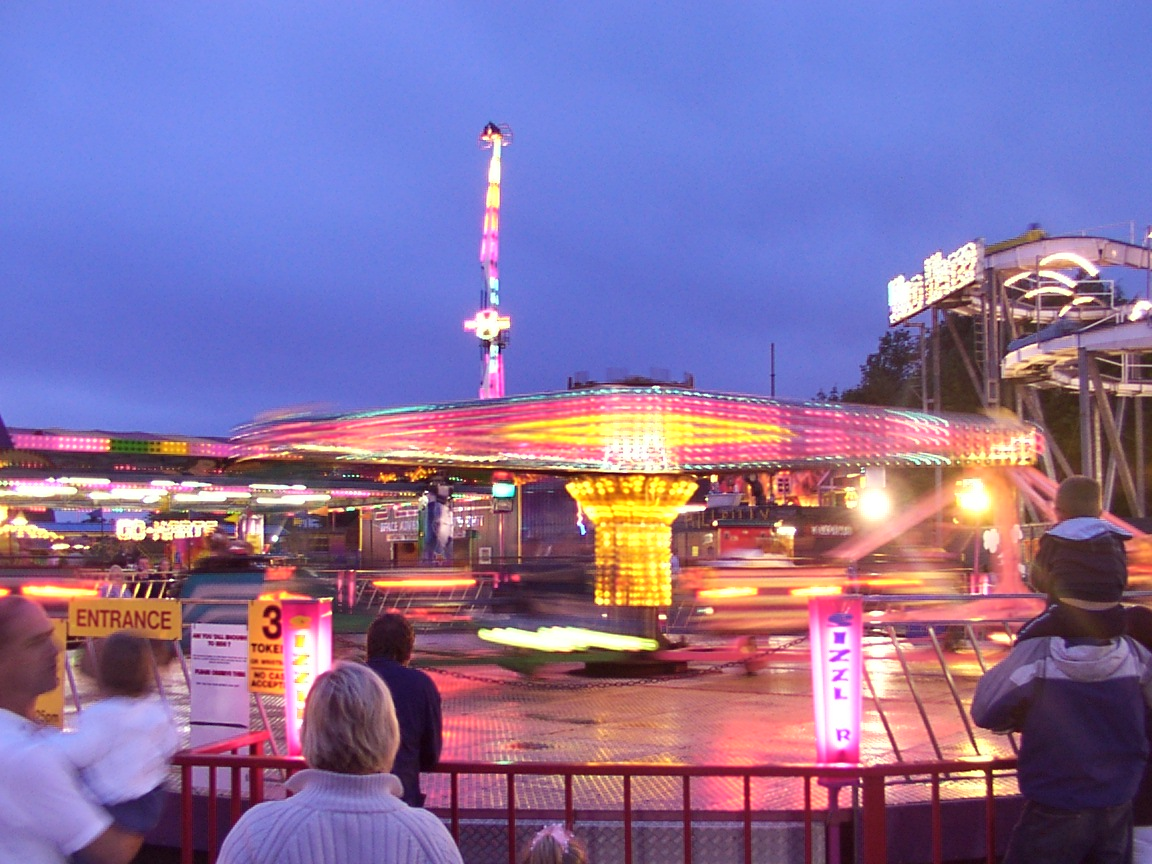

== Brean Splash ==
Brean Splash is a waterpark owned and managed by Holiday Resort Unity under the Brean Leisure Park branding. In 2014 Brean Splash made a £2 Million (GBP) investment on a brand new indoor splash aspect of the waterpark which has been operating since summer 2014.
