= Shockwave (disambiguation) =

A shock wave is a type of propagating disturbance in a fluid, gas, or plasma medium.

Shockwave may also refer to:

== Amusement rides ==
- Shock Wave (Brean Leisure Park), a looping roller coaster
- Shockwave (Canada's Wonderland), a thrill ride at Canada's Wonderland
- Shockwave (Dreamworld), a Zamperla Disk'O at Dreamworld
- Shockwave (Kings Dominion), a former stand-up roller coaster at Kings Dominion
- Shockwave (Six Flags Great America), a large defunct roller coaster manufactured by Arrow Dynamics at Six Flags Great America in Gurnee
- Shock Wave (Six Flags Over Texas), a roller coaster at the amusement park Six Flags Over Texas
- Shockwave (Drayton Manor), a roller coaster at Drayton Manor Theme Park
- Batman The Escape, a stand-up roller coaster known as Shockwave at Six Flags Magic Mountain and Six Flags Great Adventure

== Books and comics ==
- Shockwave, a comic book character in DC Comics
- Shockwave (comics), a comic book character in Marvel Comics
- Shockwave (G.I. Joe), a 1988 toy/action figure (and later comic book character)
- Shockwave (Transformers), a comic book character
- Shock Wave (novel), a 1996 novel written by Clive Cussler
- Shockwave, the novelization of the Star Trek: Enterprise episode, see List of Star Trek: Enterprise novels
- "Shockwave", a title in the 2013 audiobook series Doctor Who: Destiny of the Doctor

== Film and television ==
- Shock Wave (film), a 2017 Hong Kong action film
- Shock Waves (film), a horror movie from 1977 directed by Ken Wiederhorn
- Shockwave, Darkside, 2007 science fiction film
- "Shockwave" (Star Trek: Enterprise), a 2002 episode of Star Trek: Enterprise
- Shockwave (TV series), a documentary distributed by The History Channel
- NWA Shockwave (TV program), a professional wrestling series

== Games and amusements ==
- Shockwave (game portal), a digital video game distributor and portal
- Shockwave (video game), a 1990 puzzle game developed and published by American Game Cartridges
- Shockwave Assault, a 1994 3D shooter by Electronic Arts also released under the title Shock Wave

== Music ==
=== Albums ===
- Shock Waves (Leather Leone album), 1989
- Shock Waves (Vow Wow album), 1986
- Shockwave, an album by Decoded Feedback, 2003
- Shockwave, an album by Marshmello, 2021
- Shockwaves, an album by Unkle Bob, 2010
- Shockwave, an album by Sheena Easton Recorded in, 1986 released, 2026

=== Songs ===
- "Shockwave" (Black Tide song), 2007
- "Shockwave" (Liam Gallagher song), 2019
- "Shockwave" (B-Side of Eternity Sheena Easton song), 1986
- "Shockwaves", a song by Diana Ross from her 1987 album Red Hot Rhythm & Blues
- "Shock Wave", a song by Black Sabbath from the 1978 album Never Say Die!

== People ==
- Chris "Shockwave" Sullivan, American actor and vocal percussionist

== Sports ==
- San Diego Shockwave, a 2007 expansion team from the National Indoor Football League
- Shockwave (2000 yacht), a sailing yacht that sank during a 2009 race off New South Wales, Australia
- Shockwave (2002 yacht), a 2002 sailing yacht
- Shockwave (2008 yacht), a 2008 sailing yacht
- Shockwave (jet truck), a family of jet-powered trucks
- NWA Shockwave, a defunct professional wrestling promotion

== Technology ==
- Adobe Shockwave, a multimedia platform for building interactive applications
