= Littlehampton =

Town in West Sussex, England

Coordinates: 50°48′34″N 0°32′27″W

- Town
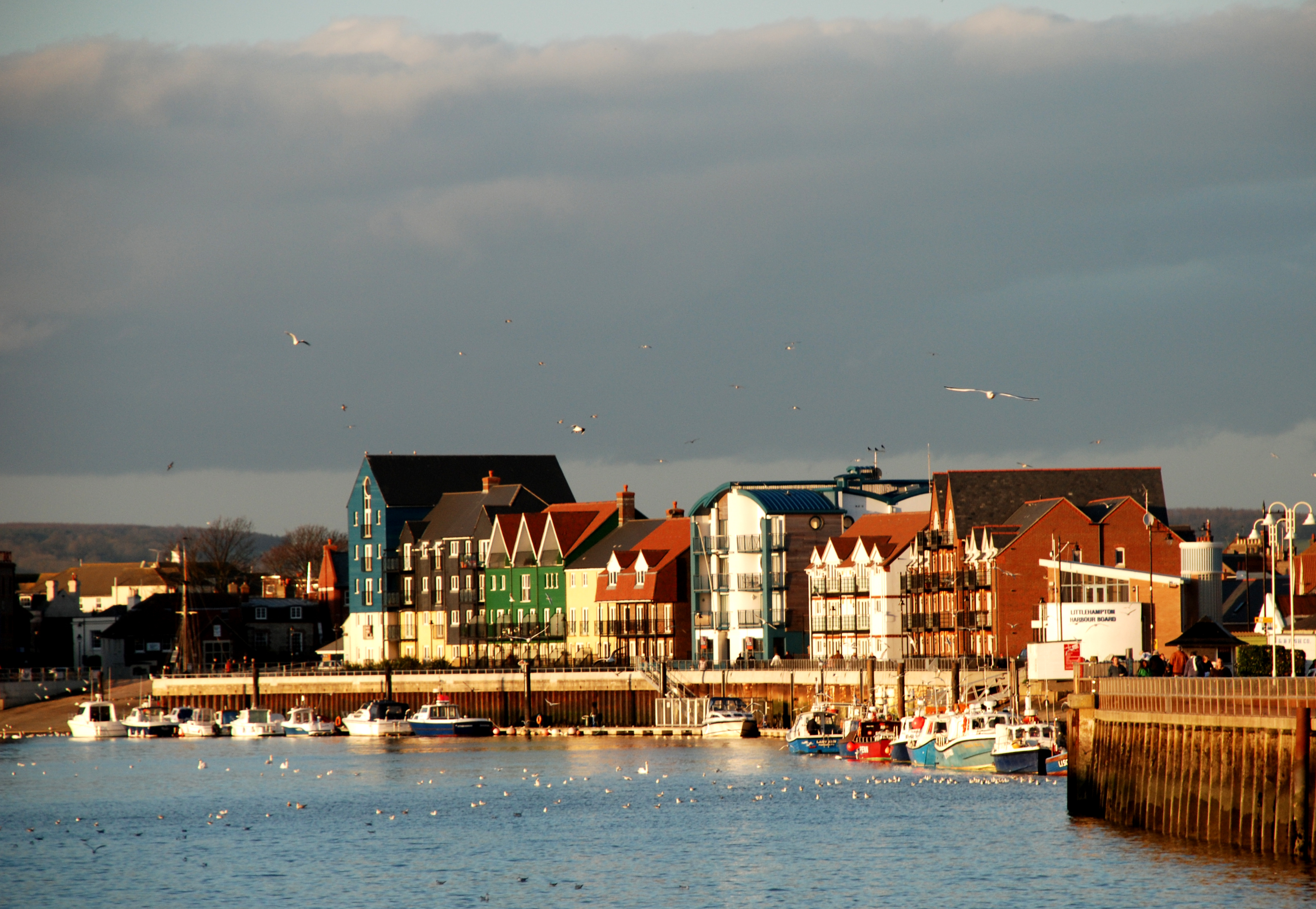
- Littlehampton Harbour

- Location within West Sussex
- Area: 10.06 km^{2} (3.88 sq mi)
- Population: 27,795 (Civil Parish.2011)
  - Density: 2,763/km^{2} (7,160/sq mi)
- OS grid reference: TQ029020
  - London: 51 mi (82 km) NNE
- Civil parish: Littlehampton
- District: Arun
- Shire county: West Sussex
- Region: South East
- Country: England
- Sovereign state: United Kingdom
- Post town: LITTLEHAMPTON
- Postcode district: BN17
- Dialling code: 01903
- Police: Sussex
- Fire: West Sussex
- Ambulance: South East Coast
- UK Parliament: Bognor Regis and Littlehampton
- Website: Littlehampton Town Council

Littlehampton is a town, seaside resort and civil parish in the Arun District of West Sussex, England. It lies on the English Channel on the eastern bank of the mouth of the River Arun. It is 52 miles (84 km) south south-west of London, 19 miles (31 km) west of Brighton and 10 miles (16 km) east of Chichester.

The parish covers an area of 11.35 km^{2} (4 sq mi). The suburban area of the town has a population of approximately 55,000. The conurbation includes other settlements: Wick in the north west; Lyminster to the north; and Rustington to the east. Wick and Toddington, which has a large business park, became part of the town in 1901. Nearby towns include Bognor Regis to the west and Worthing to the east.

The town is also the westernmost settlement of the 15th largest urban area in England and Wales, the Brighton/Worthing/Littlehampton conurbation, a region encompassing 474,485 people (2011 census). The South Downs National Park commences 3 miles (4.8 km) north of the town: Littlehampton links to Amberley and Arundel by footpaths and railway as well as by roads.

== History ==
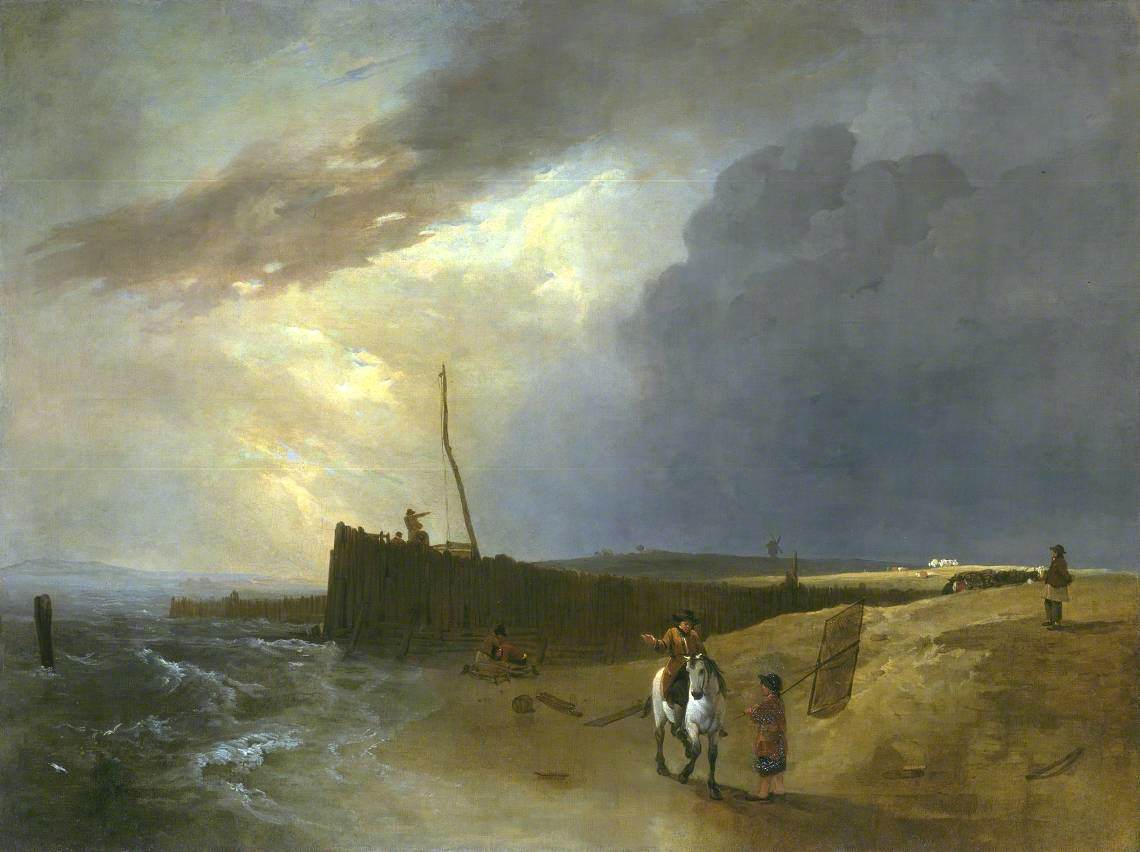
Littlehampton Pier by Augustus Wall Callcott, 1812

A human settlement at Littlehampton can be traced back to prehistoric and Roman times, while it appears in the Domesday Book of 1086 as the hamlet of 'Hantone'. The settlement is believed to have been a fishing community around this time, appearing on a French map in around 1100 as 'Hanton'. The settlement is then believed to have been given to the Abbey of St Martin de Seez in Normandy, who owned Littlehampton until around 1400. The area then passed back to the ownership of successive Earls of Arundel and Dukes of Norfolk, whose successors still reside in Arundel today.

Littlehampton began to develop as a port as a result of constant silting of the River Arun, perhaps leading to the prefix of 'Little' being added to 'Hampton', in order to distinguish it from the larger Southampton further along the coast. The expansion of port activities led to a new river mouth being cut in 1735, alongside the building of a wooden harbour. At this time it was also known as Arundel Port.

As the eighteenth century progressed, the town developed from a fishing community to a holiday destination, with Lord Byron, Samuel Taylor Coleridge, Percy Bysshe Shelley and John Constable all believed to have spent time there.

The town's status as both a port and a holiday resort led to economic success in the nineteenth century, with a railway line and a cross-channel ferry to Honfleur in France being introduced. The population of the town grew tenfold over the century, from 584 in 1801 to 5,954 in 1901. Littlehampton remained as a holiday resort in the twentieth century, becoming known as 'The Children's Paradise' in the 1920s.

Post-war Littlehampton saw much house building on the outskirts of the town, eventually absorbing the villages of Wick, Lyminster and Toddington, while the commercial element of the town became increasingly focused on boat building and water sports. In 1967, the town attracted attention by becoming the base for the first Blue Peter lifeboat.

== Economy ==
A local company, Dando Drilling International Ltd, founded in 1867, had been exporting drilling rigs from Littlehampton since 1868. Since June 2024, the company has been in voluntary liquidation. Van Heyningen Brothers (VHB) salad growers was a major employer in the town from 1964 to 2003.

The world headquarters of The Body Shop was previously situated towards the north of the town, and was a major employer in the area.

== Governance and politics ==
Littlehampton lies within the parliamentary constituency of Bognor Regis and Littlehampton, the member of parliament (MP) for which is Conservative Alison Griffiths.

At a local government level, Littlehampton is part of Littlehampton Town Council, Arun District council and West Sussex County Council. Littlehampton Town Council consists of 15 councillors elected from six wards: Beach (3), Brookfield (3), Courtwick with Toddington (3), River (3), Wick (1) and Wickbourne (2). Following the May 2023 elections, Labour holds 9 seats and the Liberal Democrats 6. Littlehampton has 10 out of 54 seats on Arun District Council, spread across four wards – Beach, Brookfield, Courtwick with Toddington, and River; at the 2023 Arun District Council election, Labour won 6 of these 10 seats and the Lib Dems 4. Littlehampton is represented on West Sussex County Council by two single-member electoral divisions: Littlehampton Town, held by the Liberal Democrats, and Littlehampton East, held by the Conservatives.

== Education ==
Littlehampton has one secondary school, The Littlehampton Academy, which opened in 2009, replacing the Littlehampton Community School.

For younger children there are five primary schools – Lyminster, River Beach, St. Catherine's, White Meadows and Georgian Gardens. In 2011, following a major reorganisation of primary school provision in the town, six separate junior and infant schools were replaced with four primary schools. River Beach Primary was formed from the merging of Connaught Junior with Arun Vale and Elm Grove Infants schools, whilst the merger of Flora McDonald Junior and Wickbourne Infants schools brought about the creation of White Meadows. Lyminster existed before the reorganisation as an infant school and has now begun a phased expansion to become a primary school, whilst St. Catherine's existed before the reorganistaion as a primary school.

== Transport ==
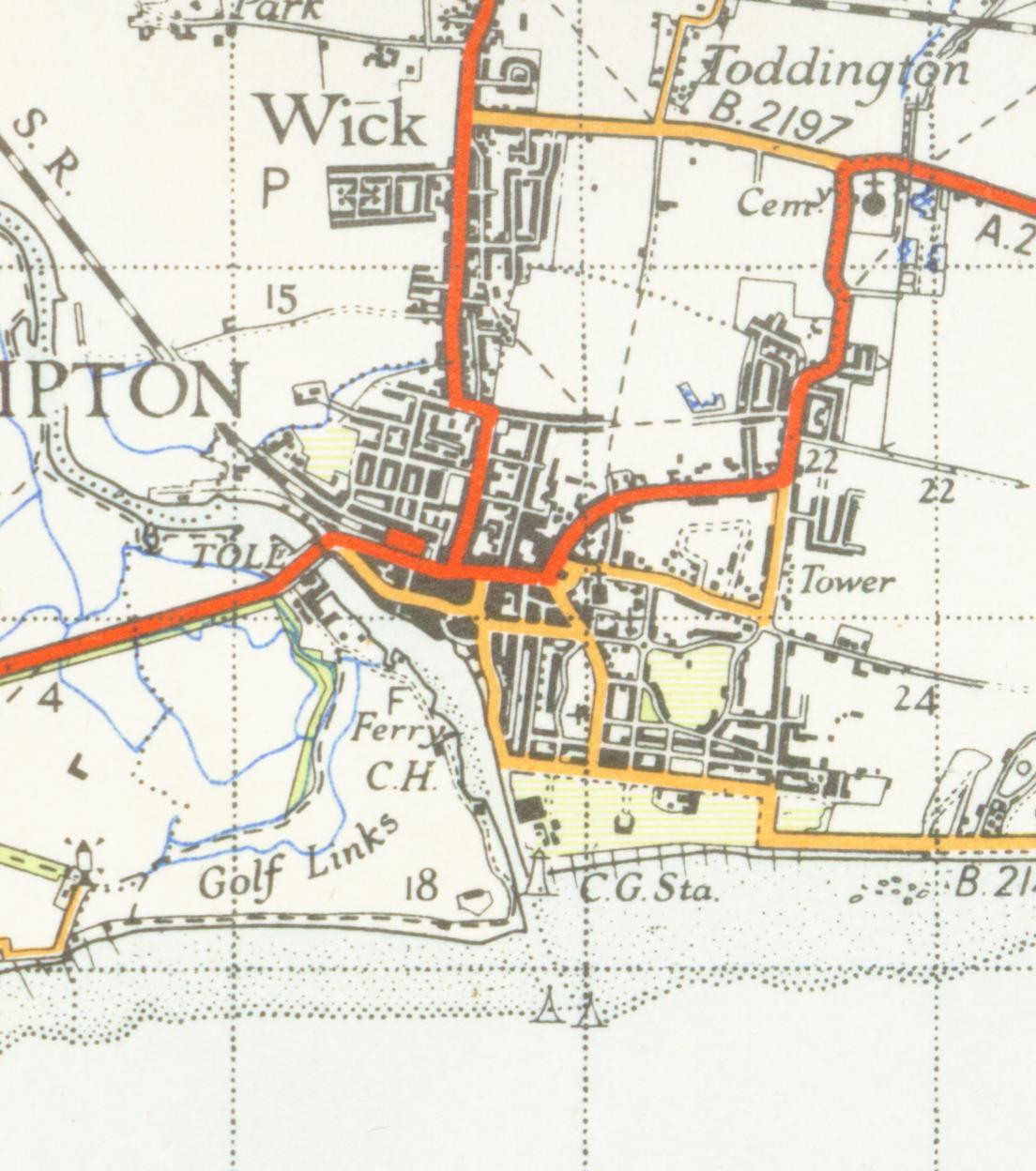
A map of Littlehampton from 1946

Littlehampton is on the A259, though this bypasses most of the town. Littlehampton is connected to the A27 south coast trunk road by the A284, which also provides the main north–south route out of the town and links to the A29 and A24. The A27 also later links with the M27. The A280 also links Littlehampton to the A24 and is a main route from the north-east.

Littlehampton is served by three railway stations: Littlehampton, Angmering and Ford.

Train services from Littlehampton are provided by Southern with direct services to Brighton, London Victoria, Gatwick Airport, East Croydon, Bognor Regis, Chichester, Portsmouth and Southampton.

The Littlehampton Ferry links the east and west banks of the Arun. The ferry operates from 31 March to 30 September between 10 am and 5 pm, although has been closed in recent years due to the ongoing COVID-19 pandemic. The ferry company also provided harbour tours.

Gatwick Airport is an hour away to the north, Southampton Airport is an hour and a half away to the west, Chichester/Goodwood Airfield is 30 minutes also to the west and Shoreham Airport is 45 minutes to the east. The Port of Dover and the Channel Tunnel about three hours to the east; Portsmouth Harbour an hour to the west and the Port of Newhaven about an hour to the east.

Littlehampton has a number of bus routes operated by Compass Travel and Stagecoach South. The bus station at Littlehampton handles anything up to 1,000 passengers a day.

Littlehampton also has a small number of taxis, with taxi ranks all over the town and four different taxi companies.

== Littlehampton port ==
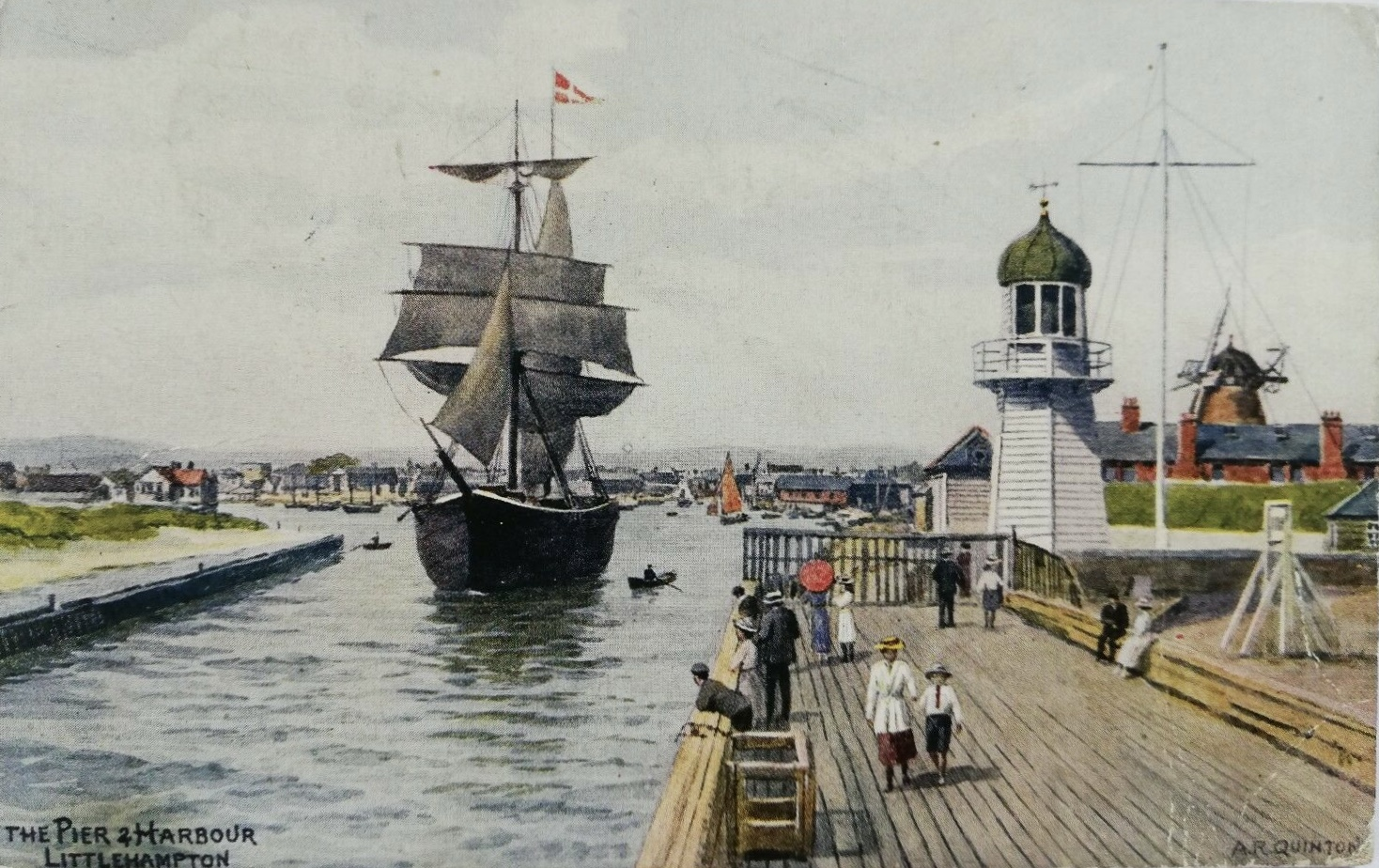
The Pier & Harbour Littlehampton, watercolour by A. R. Quinton, c. 1920

Littlehampton's port is based around the River Arun, which opens onto the English Channel. A small stretch of this, 5 miles (8 km) out to sea and 6 miles (10 km) wide, is locally known as the "Littlehampton Channel". Littlehampton started as a fishing port but now is a thriving port for thousands of leisure craft which visit from all over the UK and Europe. In 2009, use of leisure craft at Littlehampton rose to the extent that at least 200 more moorings were required.

Littlehampton is also a commercial port, handling around 50–60 ships a year from Ireland, the Netherlands, Germany, Belgium and France with cargo including marine aggregates, stone, marble chippings and timber. From the early 1920s David Hillyard built yachts in Littlehampton, and the company of David Hillyard Ltd continued here until 2009, producing a total of over 850 yachts.

== Open spaces ==
- Mewsbrook Park
- Brookfield Park
- Rosemead Open Space
- East Beach Green
- West Beach Nature Reserve
- Norfolk Gardens
- Middle Mead
- Water Lane Recreation Ground
- St Catherines Recreation Ground
- Southfields Recreation Ground
- Linden Park Recreational Ground

== Churches and cemeteries ==
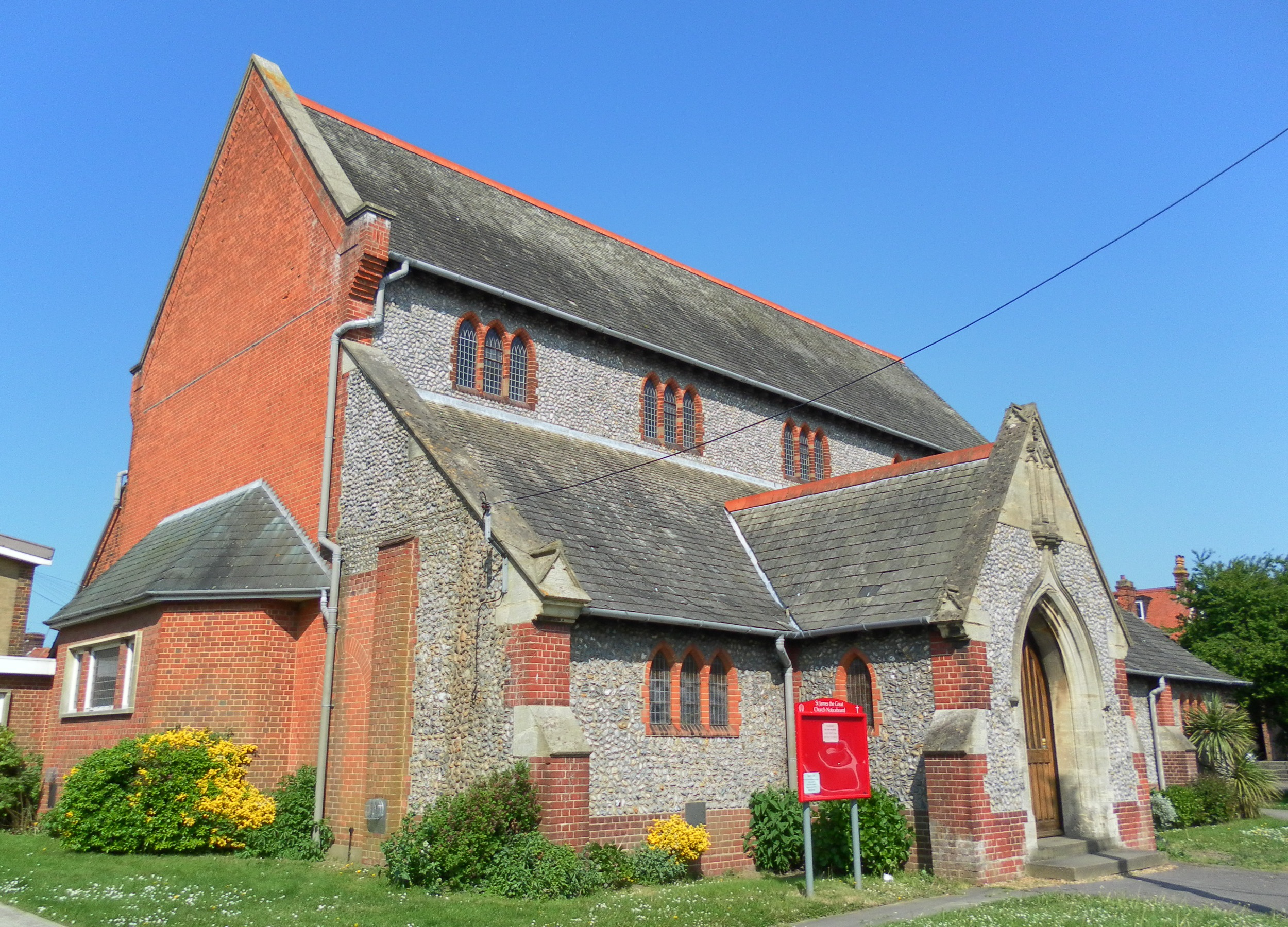
St James the Great Church

St Mary's is the Anglican parish church while St Catherine's is the principal Catholic church. In the cemetery, which is on the northern side of the town, lies the grave of Katharine O'Shea ("Kitty O'Shea") (1845–1921), the wife of Charles Stewart Parnell.

There are two other Anglican churches: St James the Great on Arundel Road and All Saints in Wick. Littlehampton Baptist Church, Littlehampton United Church (United Reformed and Methodist), Parkside Evangelical Church, the Arun Community Church (Evangelical), Trinity Church (Evangelical) and the Quaker Friends Meeting House also serve the town.

== Arts and culture ==
The Littlehampton bonfire procession, bonfire and firework display is an annual event which has been organised by the Littlehampton Bonfire Society since 1952. It is part of a series of bonfire festivals organised by Sussex Bonfire Societies throughout Sussex.

Littlehampton supports a range of performance groups including Stagedoor Theatre Company, The Edwin James Festival Choir & Orchestra, The Musical Comedy Society and Players Operatic Society who perform throughout the year. It also holds a popular 'Last Night of the Proms' concert performed annually by the Littlehampton Concert Band.

=== On-screen Littlehampton ===
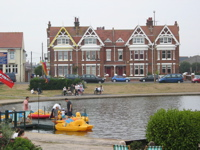
The Oyster Pond

- Character actor Stanley Holloway (1890–1982) died in The Nightingale Nursing Home, Littlehampton, in 1982 aged 91.
- Littlehampton was the backdrop for Swanage for the first episode of series 2 of the comedy drama series, The Inbetweeners, with filming taking place on the promenade and River Arun. Also the fifth episode of series 2, when Simon goes to see his dad, was filmed at the Travelodge by the Body Shop.
- Littlehampton is used as the town centre for the 'Moving On' episode of the BBC sitcom Ever Decreasing Circles
- Littlehampton appears in an episode of The Hungry Sailors on ITV.
- Odd Man Out, a comedy TV series from 1977 starring John Inman, was based in Littlehampton. It was about a man who leaves the safety of his Blackpool fish and chip shop to take over his deceased father's seaside rock factory in Littlehampton with his step-sister Dorothy. The programme ran for one series.
- Wicked Little Letters is set in 1920s Littlehampton, based on a true story about the Littlehampton libels.
- Carry On Jack, a 1964 British comedy film, makes reference to Littlehampton several times.

=== Littlehampton in books ===
- Comedian and TV personality, Paul O'Grady, talks about his time living in Littlehampton before embarking on a comedy career in his autobiography.
- Littlehampton is the setting for an important episode in British author Kazuo Ishiguro's 2005 novel Never Let Me Go.
- Littlehampton Beach is the setting for Stuart Millard's Beach Diaries series of books.

== Local media ==
Littlehampton Gazette is the town's weekly local newspaper.

== Commerce and tourism ==
=== The East Beach Cafe ===
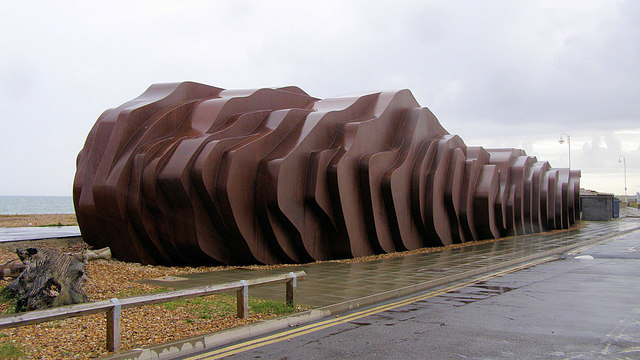
The East Beach Cafe viewed from the rear

The East Beach Cafe, designed by Heatherwick Studio, opened on the seafront of Littlehampton's east beach in July 2007.

The building is a fully welded monocoque structure, reflecting its exposed location with a rough, weathered appearance, which Heatherwick describes as being like a piece of weathered flotsam swept up onto the beach. It was built in Littlehampton, with steelwork by Littlehampton Welding Ltd and site work by Langridge Developments, another local firm.

=== The Longest Bench ===
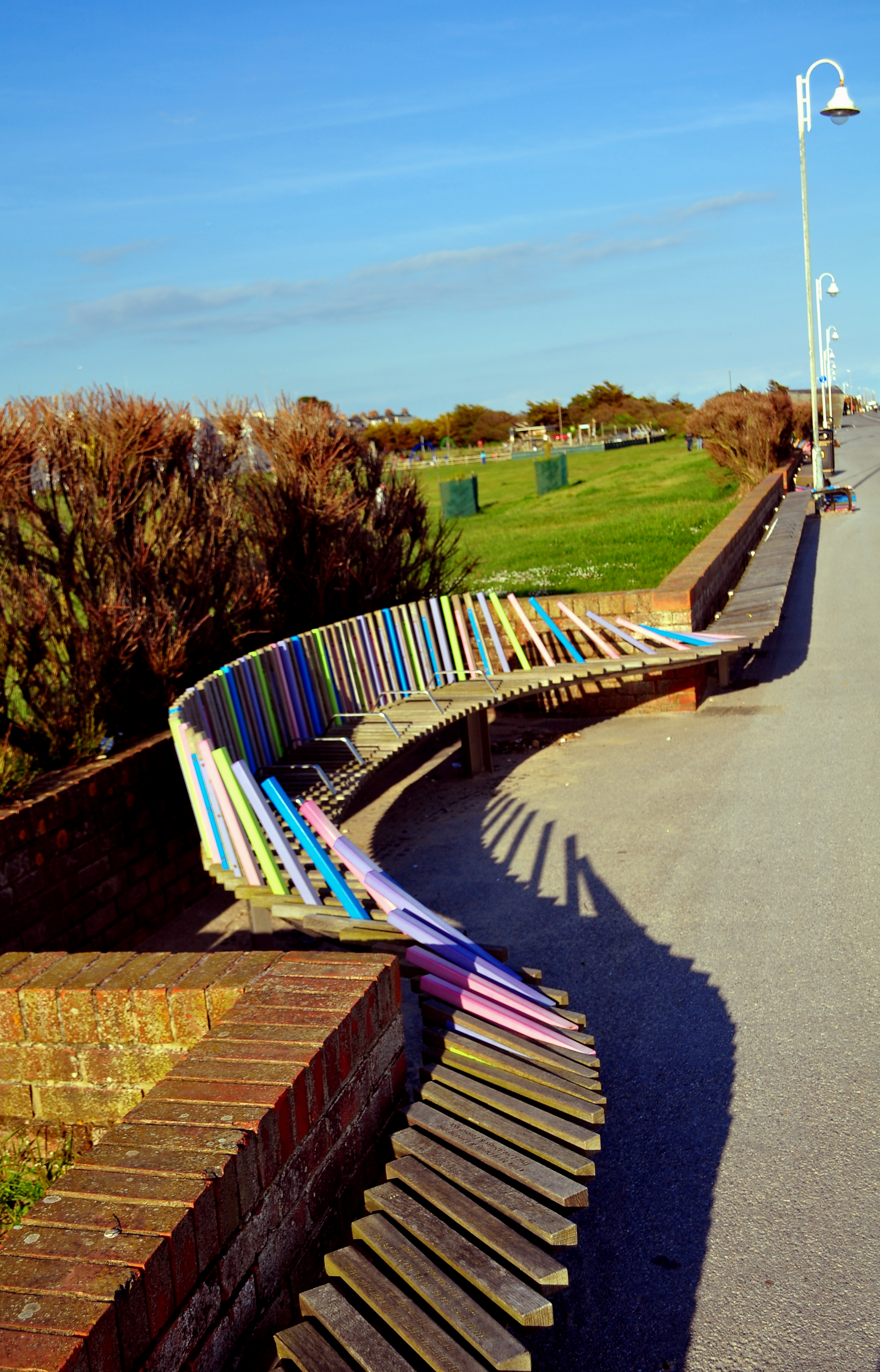
A part of Littlehampton's Longest Bench

Littlehampton is home to Britain's longest bench. The bench was designed by Studio Weave, a London-based architecture practice and opened in mid-July 2010. It was designed based on initial ideas by children from Littlehampton's Connaught Junior school and was funded by Anita Roddick's husband Gordon and from a CABE grant from the Department for Culture, Media and Sport.

The bench is a continuous structure stretching 324 metres along the majority of Littlehampton's east beach promenade and is constructed of tropical hardwood slats reclaimed from coastal groynes and landfill. The bench is described by Studio Weave as "a charm bracelet gifted to the town as a delicate piece of jewellery that can accommodate new and varied additions. The form of the bracelet's chain is informed by the simple seaside boardwalk together with some maths that envisages movement."

=== Look and Sea Centre ===
The Look and Sea centre includes the Harbour Lights café and an observation tower. As of 2025, only the café remains open

=== Harbour Park ===
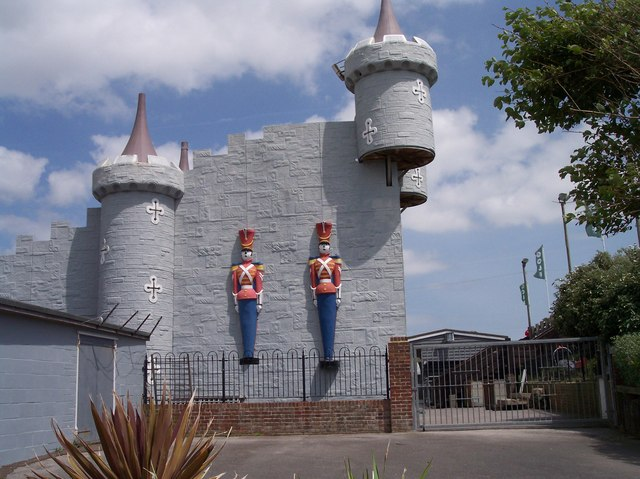
Rear West view of the giant slide in Harbour Park

Harbour Park is at the entrance of the River Arun with two restaurants, two arcades, a rollercoaster, log flume and other attractions.

=== Boat trips ===
A number of operators offer services out of Littlehampton harbour with ferry services across the river, sight seeing trips around the harbour, to Arundel, Brighton, Chichester and the Isle of Wight and speed boat rides to Worthing Pier, the Southampton Power Boat Show, Lymington Power Boat Show and to Cowes and Torquay for the Cowes to Torquay power boat race.

=== Norfolk Gardens ===
Norfolk Gardens, a multi-purpose outdoor site operated by Tivoli Lifestyle, is further along the promenade. The site includes a 9-hole pitch and putt course, a refurbished 9-hole adventure golf course renamed Buccaneer Bay, tennis and bowls, and a café.

The Littlehampton Miniature Railway runs for 800 yards from Norfolk Gardens to Mewsbrook Park and is the oldest 12¼" (311mm) gauge railway in the UK.

=== Littlehampton Harbour ===
Littlehampton harbour (see also Littlehampton Port above) is on the River Arun at the western side of the town, with yacht moorings. Also on the west bank of the river are Littlehampton Redoubt and Climping sand dunes.

== Public services ==
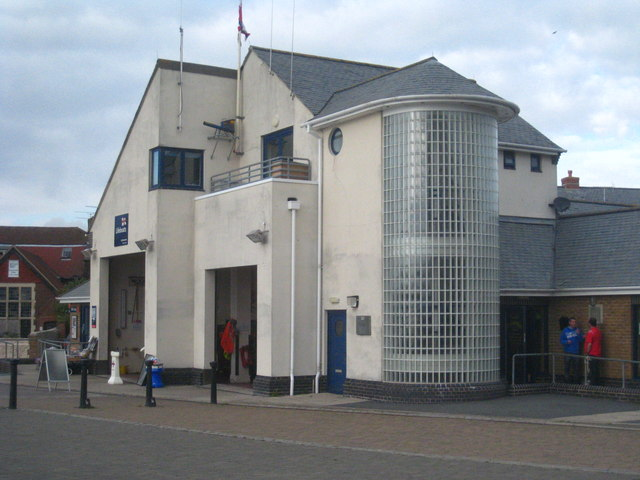
Littlehampton lifeboat station

Littlehampton lifeboat station is one of the UK's busiest RNLI Lifeboat stations. As well as providing local search and rescue coverage, volunteer crew members also provided humanitarian help during flooding in East Pakistan over 35 years ago. The lifeboat station operates two boats: an Atlantic 85 class lifeboat, Renee Sherman (B-891) and a D Class Lifeboat, Ray of Hope (D-769). The Arun class of lifeboats (in service 1971–2008) take their name from the Arun river, which comes to a head at Littlehampton, however no Arun-class lifeboats have been stationed at the station. Until the retiring of the Atlantic 75 class lifeboat, Blue Peter 1 (B-779) in 2016, Littlehampton lifeboat station had operated a lifeboat funded by viewers of the BBC television programme Blue Peter since 1967.

Littlehampton's police station is situated just outside the town centre with a CID building and the head major incidents unit in West Sussex adjoining. There was also an ambulance station adjacent to the police station, although it's not in use.

Littlehampton's fire station, which is near the town centre, maintains two water-tender ladders. The station has a full-time immediate response appliance, with the second appliance covered by on-call retained firefighters. There is another fire station in East Preston with one water-tender ladder and a Red cross support unit.

Littlehampton's hospital was demolished in 2005, since then its replacement has been under debate at a local and national level. The Fitzalan Medical Group has two surgeries in Littlehampton, including the headquarters surgery just outside the town centre and one in Wick.

== Sport and Leisure ==
=== Football ===
Littlehampton Town Football Club plays in the Isthmian League South East Division (8th tier), after promotion at the end of the 2021–22 season. Home matches are played at The Sportsfield on St Flora’s Road.

=== Rugby Union ===
Littlehampton Rugby Club plays in the Sussex Intermediate League, National Level 10, after promotion at the end of the 2010–11 season. Most games are played on Saturday or Sunday afternoon, either at The Littlehampton Academy or in the West/East Sussex area. The club is also involved in the local community, including the carnival, bonfire night, dragon boat racing and other charitable events.

=== Army Cadet Force ===
Littlehampton is home to a detachment of the Sussex Army Cadet Force, a volunteer youth organisation, sponsored by the Ministry of Defence, which accepts cadets aged between 12 and 18 years of age.

== Fossils ==
The flints that make up Littlehampton's West Beach contain quite a few fossils. The flints are formed by silica from sea sponges and diatoms from around 60 to 95 million years ago. Some of the creatures become fossilised and can be seen as patterns on the outside of the flint. These are known locally as Shepherds crowns. The Littlehampton Museum occasionally organises fossil hunting walks during the school holidays.

== Twinning ==
Littlehampton is twinned with two towns, each of which is twinned with the others:

- Durmersheim, Germany
- Chennevières-sur-Marne, France

== Arms ==
Coat of arms of Littlehampton

Notes
Originally granted to the former Urban District Council on 29 July 1935.
Escutcheon
Per chevron engrailed Azure and Argent in chief a martlet volant between two cross-crosslets fitchée of the second and in base on water barry wavy Proper a lymphad Sable.
Motto
Progress
