= Mewsbrook Park =

Urban park in Littlehampton, West Sussex, England

Coordinates: 50.80384°N 0.52396°W

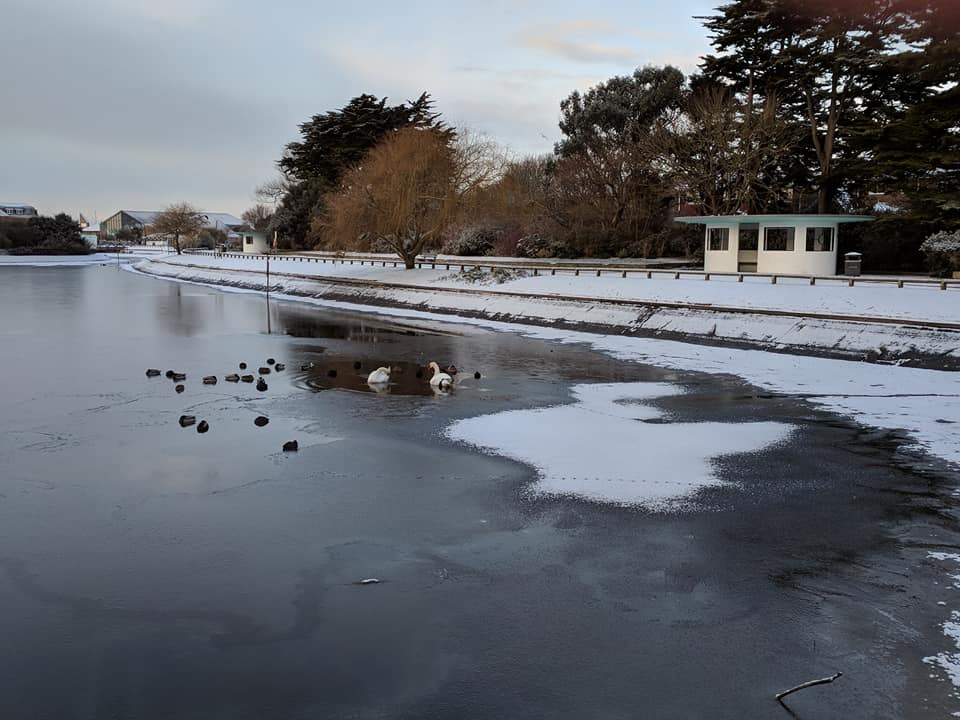
- Winter scene at Mewsbrook Park; with art deco shelter, pictured in 2017
- Interactive map of Mewsbrook Park
- Type: Urban park
- Location: Littlehampton, West Sussex, England
- Area: 4 hectares (9.9 acres)
- Created: 1939

Mewsbrook Park is a four-hectare (ten-acre) urban park located in the seaside resort of Littlehampton, West Sussex, England. The park is located a few minutes’ walk from the beach and boasts a number of attractions including a boating lake, miniature railway, café, original art deco shelters and children's playarea.

== Description ==
Mewsbrook Park is owned and managed by Arun District Council in partnership with principal contractors Tivoli Group Limited.

The park was first opened to the public in 1939, and sets a high horticultural benchmark (evidenced by its award-winning status) for public parks and open spaces. Large shrub and long herbaceous borders together with bee and butterfly gardens provide colour and interest throughout the year.

The lake serves as an excellent local amenity, and is regularly used by visitors for boating. The Arun Youth Aqua Centre often used the lake for training. The lake and island are also a haven for wildlife.

Wildlife conservation is undertaken in the Ruby Gardens (named in celebration of the Ruby Jubilee of Elizabeth II in 1992); an informal woodland area where activities such as hedge laying and coppicing have taken place in the past with the assistance of local volunteer groups.

In 2017 the construction of a new leisure centre began within Mewsbrook Park, a replacement for the ageing Littlehampton Swimming and Sports Centre. In March 2019 The Littlehampton Wave opened its doors. Following demolition of the former leisure centre substantial re-landscaping is being undertaken which will add to the existing park.

There is a positive sense of community in the park, supported by the Friends of Mewsbrook Park, Mewsbrook Park Café, Mewsbrook Park Pedalo and Boat Hire and Littlehampton Miniature Railway. There is further engagement with the wider community too including the Littlehampton Swimming and Sports Centre, Littlehampton Town Council and local schools and youth organisations.

Mewsbrook Park has been promoted as a Green Flag Park in the local area for 13 years. Interpretation boards, a children's trail, tree trail and notice boards are provided to engage and inform visitors.

== Gallery ==
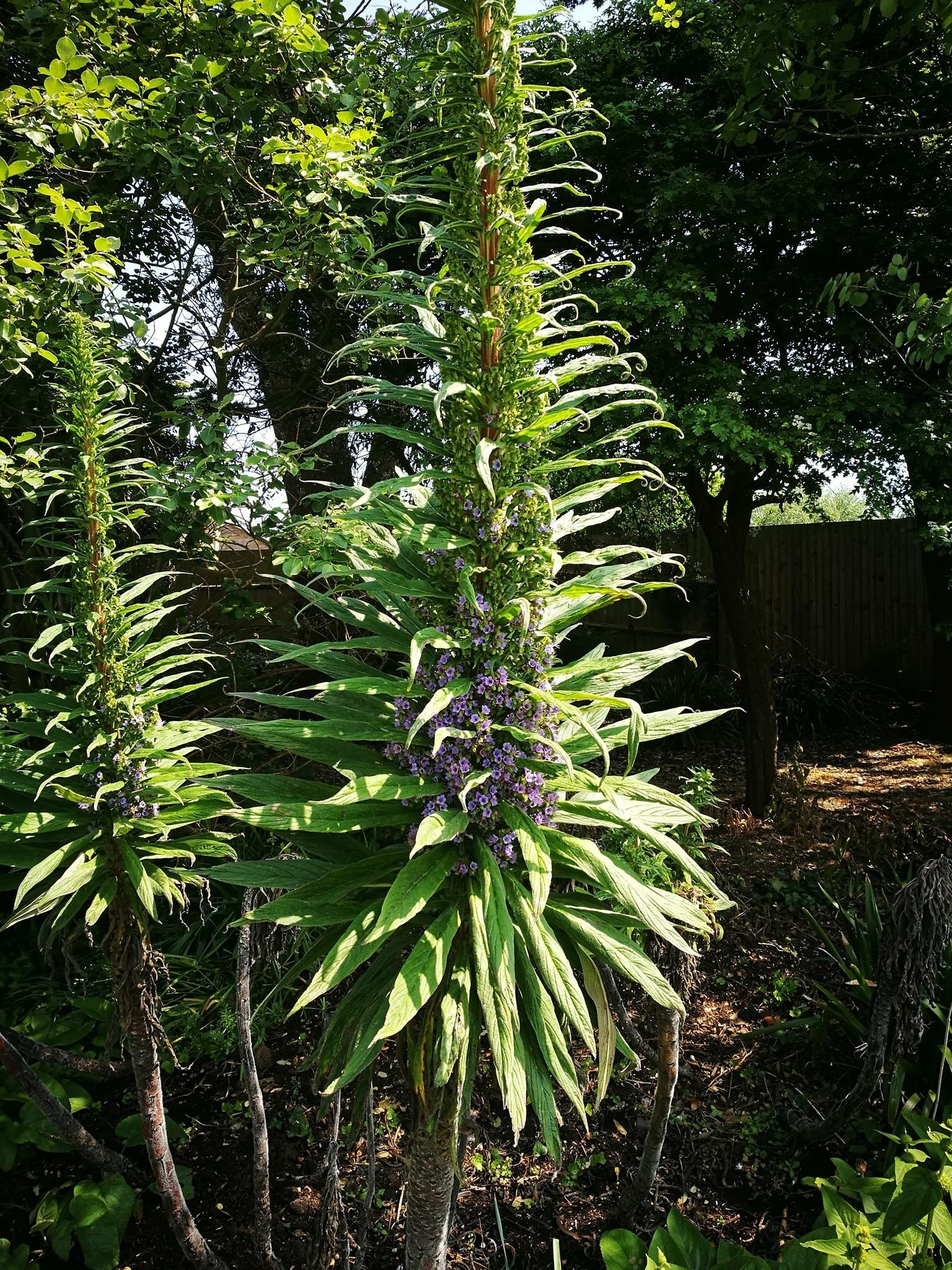
Echium located along east side of park.

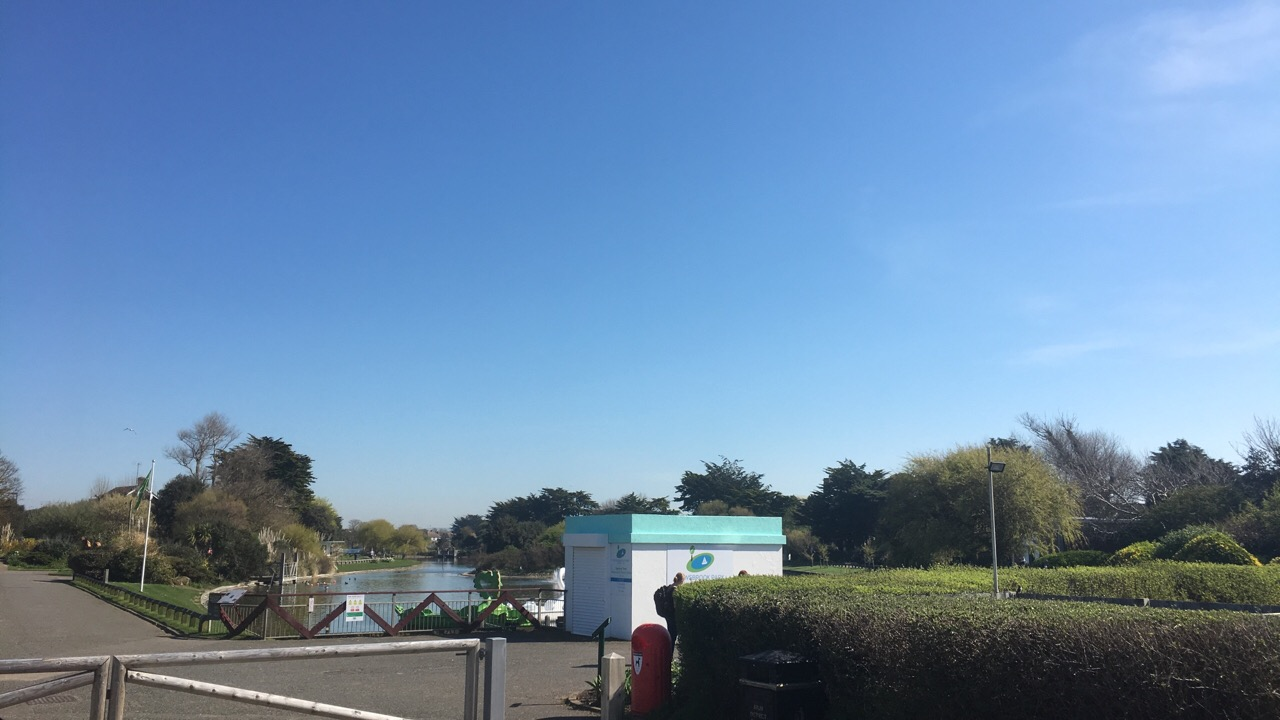
Entrance to Mewsbrook Park from the south

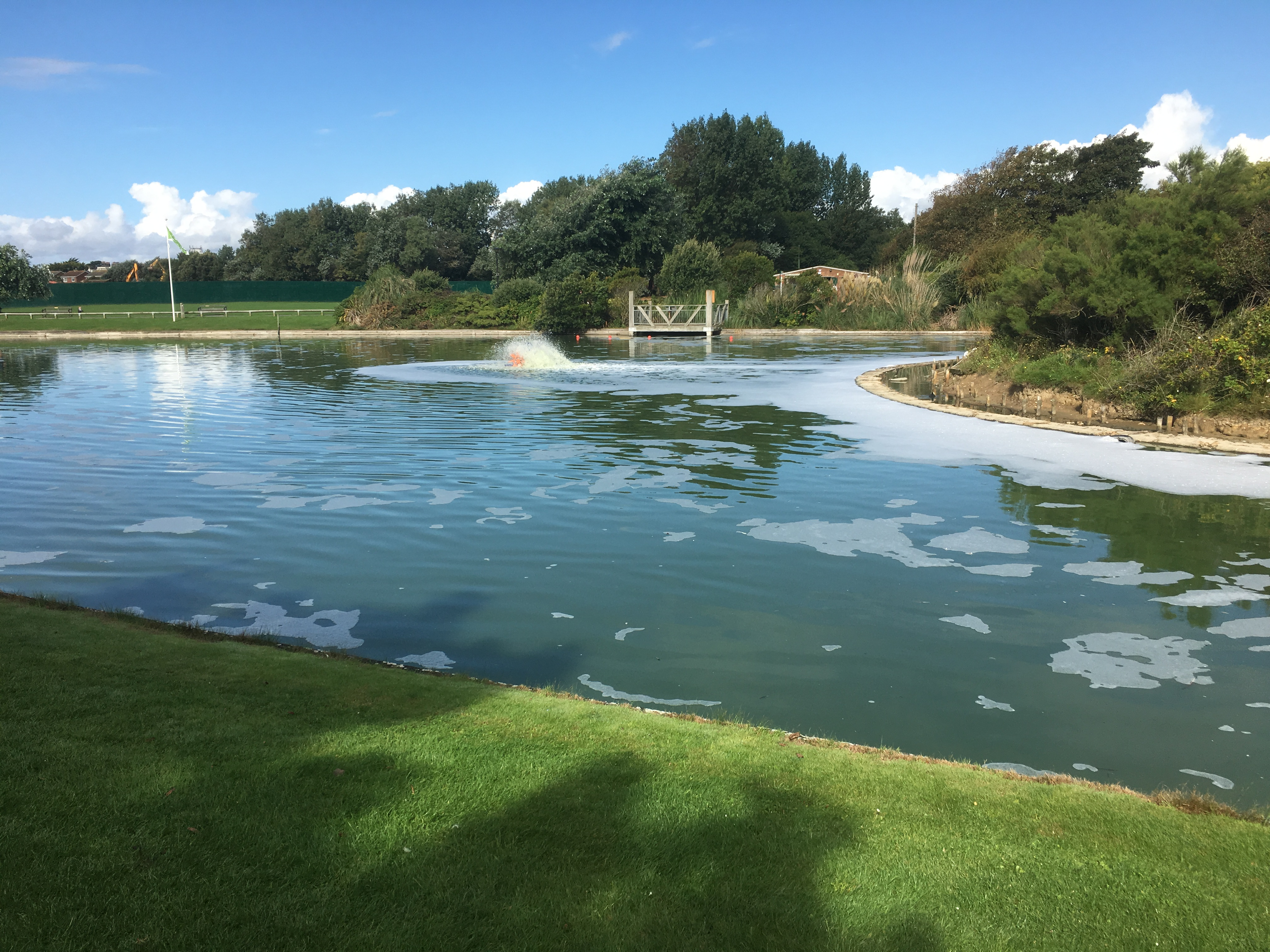
An aerator oxygenating the lake at Mewsbrook

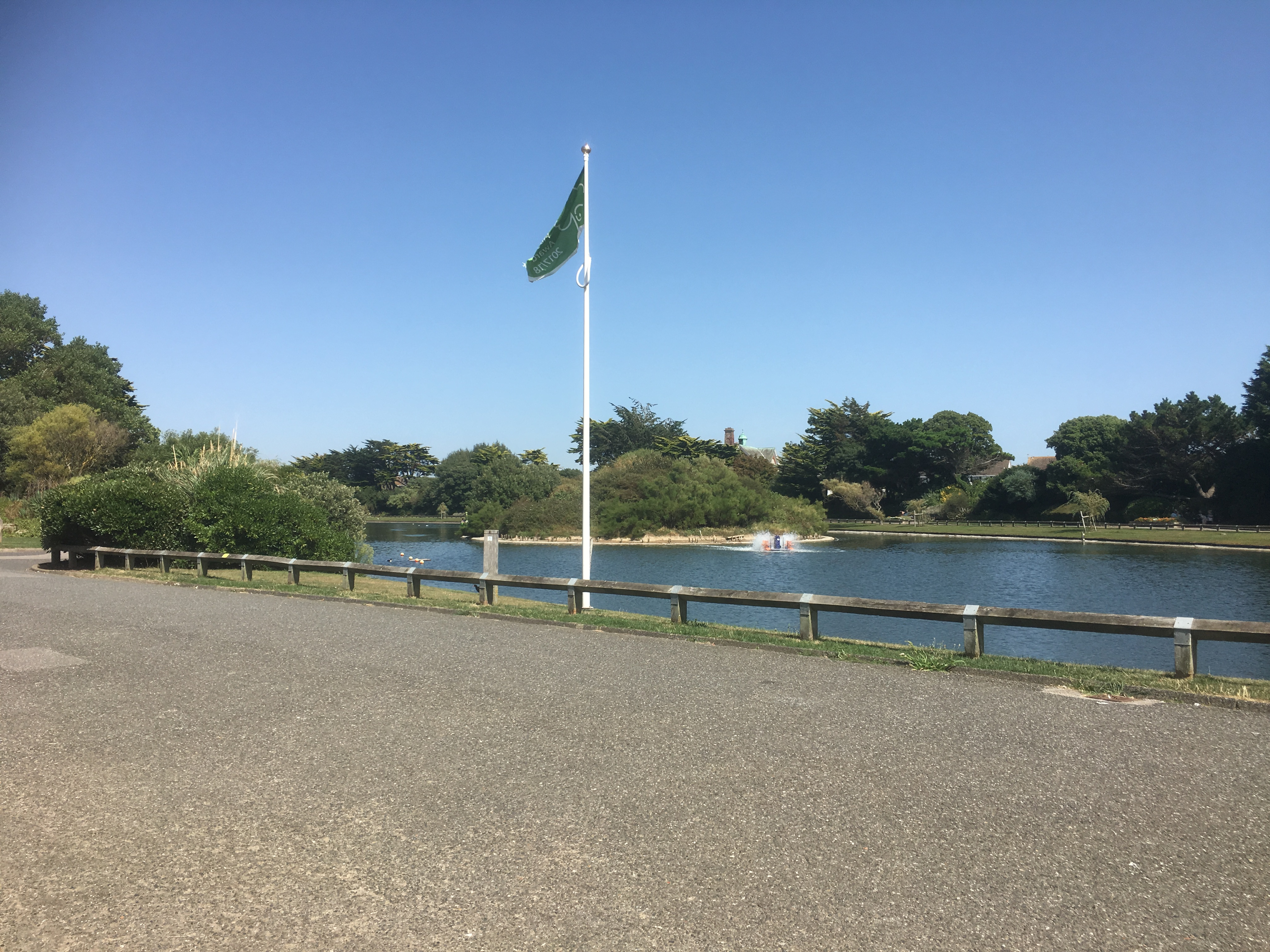
The Green Flag - for excellent Parks
