= Harbour Park =

Amusement park in England

- Previously known as Butlin's Park (1932–1977); Smart's Amusement Park (1977–1994)
- Harbour Park logo
- Interactive map of Harbour Park
- Location: Littlehampton, West Sussex, England
- Coordinates: 50.80346°N 0.541323°W
- Opened: 1932
- Owner: Wes Smart and Ash Smart
- Slogan: "Where the FUN will never set!"
- Operating season: March – October (outdoors) All year (indoor parts). Check company website for ride open dates.
- Area: approx 9,600 square metres (0.0096 km^{2}).

Attractions
- Total: 14
- Roller coasters: 1
- Water rides: 1
- Website: harbourpark.com

Harbour Park, is a free to enter children's amusement park with rides open seasonally on the coastal resort of Littlehampton, West Sussex, England, check Harbour Park's website before visiting for ride open dates. Opened in 1932, it is situated on the beach, adjacent to the working Harbour & Marina. The park features traditional rides plus other modern attractions and is aimed at primary school children and families.

== History ==
Name	Date
Harbour Park	(1995 to present)
Smarts Amusement Park	(1977 to 1994)
Butlins Park	(1932 to 1976)

The park was started in 1932 by Billy Butlin on the site of the old east bank fort and windmill It was easily spotted from a distance by the presence of a large roller coaster on the roof known as "The Wild Mouse". Early pictures of this can be viewed in the West Sussex past pictures archive reference numbers PP/WSL/PC005524 & PP/WSL/TC001729. A picture of the old site prior to construction is also available reference number PP/WSL/PC005512.

During the war the park closed from 1941 to 1945, and the building was used for storage and the gathering of troops going overseas. The building suffered bomb damage during that time; but was repaired and reopened after the war as part of the Butlin's Empire, which was later purchased by the Rank Organisation.

In 1977, the park was bought from the Rank Organisation by the Billy Smart Circus family and was renamed Smart's Amusement Park. They set about re-equipping it into a family amusement centre with a selection of indoor rides, including a hall of mirrors

In 1994, Gary Smart oversaw a sizeable redevelopment of the site. The name changed from Smart’s Amusement Park to the contemporary Harbour Park, which reflected the theme running throughout the site and its unique location on the seafront and riverside. Over the next few years, major works were undertaken and the final phase was completed in the year 2000. The roller coasters were removed during this time.

Harbour Park entered the new millennium with a new look, whilst managing to retain the Smart family values of providing a fun and entertaining family venue. In fact, Billy Smart still watches over the park in the form of a bronze statue located in the main building.

2007 saw another major investment of £750,000 including the addition of a log flume. Supplier DPV Rides of Italy developed a water ride that would feature a 6.5 metre (21 ft) drop, inside a 34×14 metre (112×46 ft) footprint.

In 2009, the indoor artificial skating rink was replaced by the soft play area.

== Attractions ==
There have been a large variety of indoor and outdoor rides and attractions. Some of the rides are described at the Roller Coaster DataBase (RCDB).

Attraction	Type	Suitable for	Height range	Added	Removed	Notes
Ocean Coaster	Wacky Worm	Family	Min 0.8m Accompanied Min 1.1m Lone Rider	23 March 2008		RCDB Data available
Dodgems		Family		1980		
Hiccup		Family	Min 1m			Mini-drop tower
The Pony Gallopers	Carousel	Small Children	Small Children Only, Not appropriate for infants			
Water Chute	Log Flume	Family	Min 1m accompanied Min 1.2m Lone Rider	2007		Water Chute with a 7.5m waterfall drop
Orca Whale Ride	Zamperla	Family		2013		Type W43
The Spinning Barrels	Teacups	Youngsters	Small children only			
Octo's Flying Animals		Family	Min 1m Accompanied Min 1.3m Lone Rider	2006		
The Crazy Bikes		Teens+	Min 1.5m			Pedal as fast as you can to take a 360-degree spin around
Formula 1 Circuit		Youngsters	Small children only. Not suitable for adults or older children			Youngsters can beep the horn on the Barbie Car or ring the bell on the Fire Engine etc.
Fantasy Train		Youngsters	Small children only			
The Bouncy Aquarium		Children	Up to age 11 max.			
Trampolines		Children	Up to age 11 max.			
Castle Slide		Family	Min height 90 cm. Min age 4 years.	Unknown		
House of Mystery		Family	PG advised			Formerly Horror Hotel
Sharkesville Crazy Golf		Family				Shipwreck themed 9 holes
Miner's Gold Rush		Family				Collect the pieces of gold you find and trade them in for a prize at the weighing station
Indoor Soft Play Area		Children	Up to 1.58 m max.	2009		includes an over 3's section and a separate 3 and under section. This allows older children to run round and enjoy multi-level platforms, cannonball blasters, ball volcano, ramps and rope swings. Whilst, the toddlers, can be at ease in a mini ball pond, see-through observation tunnel, mini slide and soft toys.
Indoor Skating Rink		Family			2009	Replaced with the soft play area
Amusement Arcade		Family				The main building arcade has video drivers, shooters, pushers, prize games and cranes. The fishing village building is home to skill prize ticket games.
Farmyard Friends Chicken Show		Family				sing-a-long with the chickens to scare the Fox off! This show is free every hour during school holidays

== Refreshment Areas ==
- A maritime themed Galley Restaurant & Tea Rooms (serving tea the old-fashioned way with real leaves)
- The Harbour Coffee House, which offers a selection of hot and cold food, and frothy hot chocolate with marshmallows
- The Riverside Parlours serving hot fresh doughnuts, ice creams, and other light refreshments.

== Gallery ==
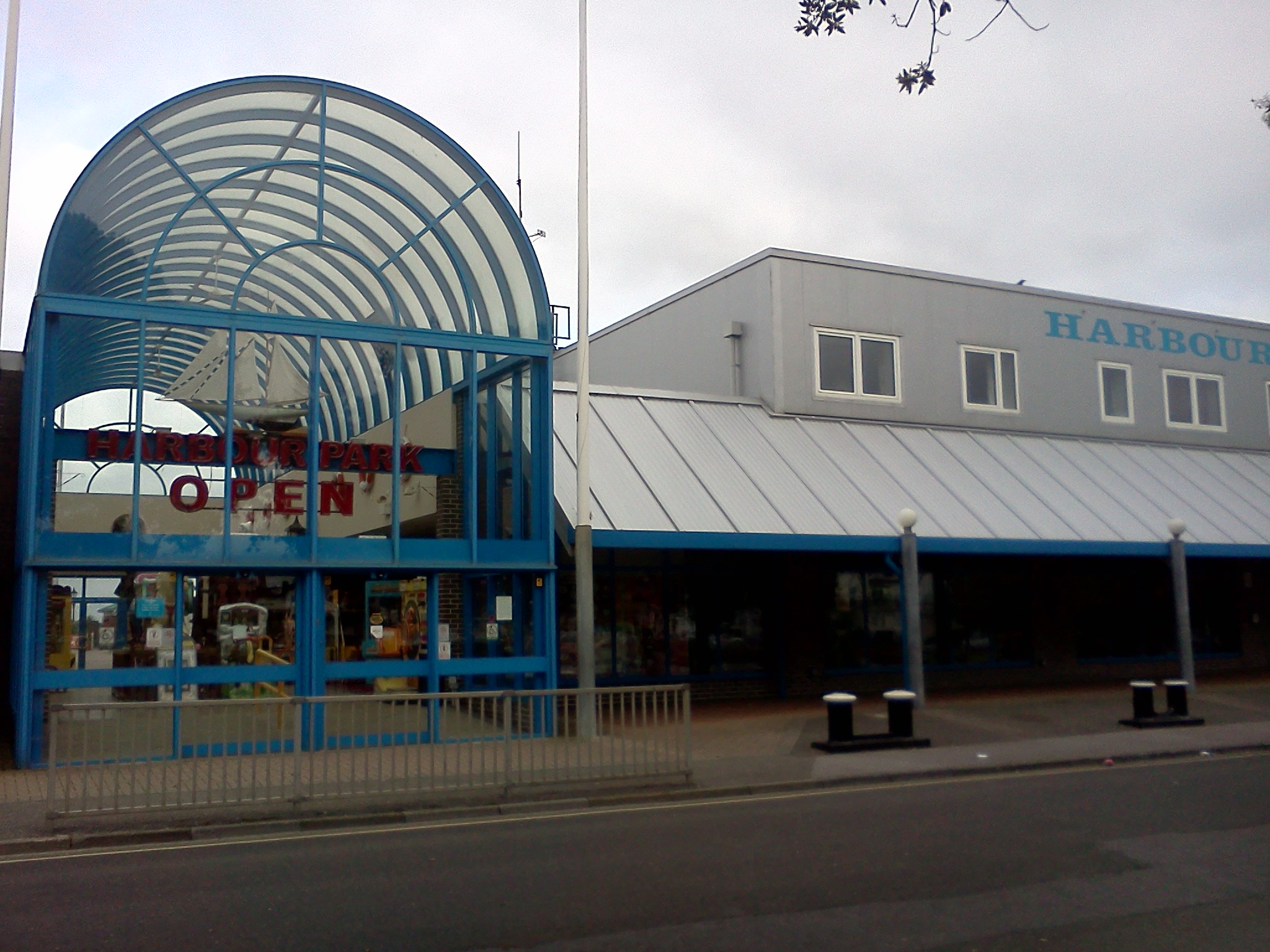
Entrance to the Main Building from the East

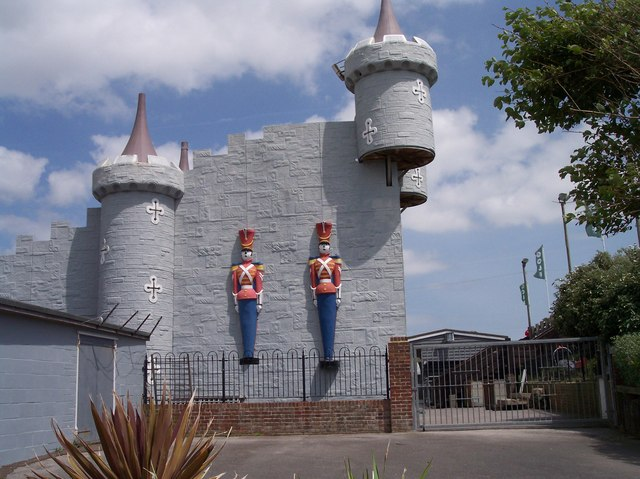
Rear west side of the giant slides

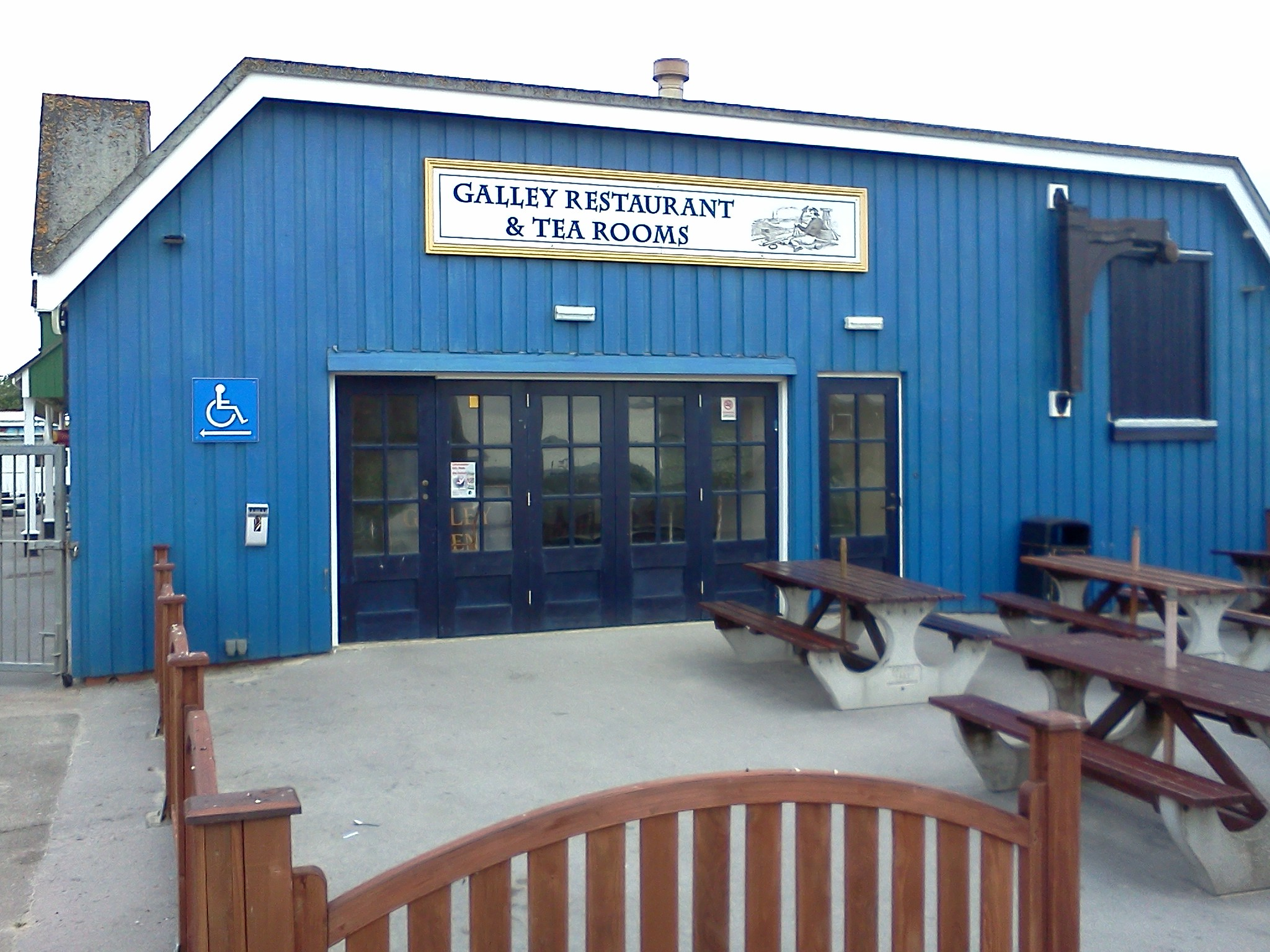
The Galley Restaurant

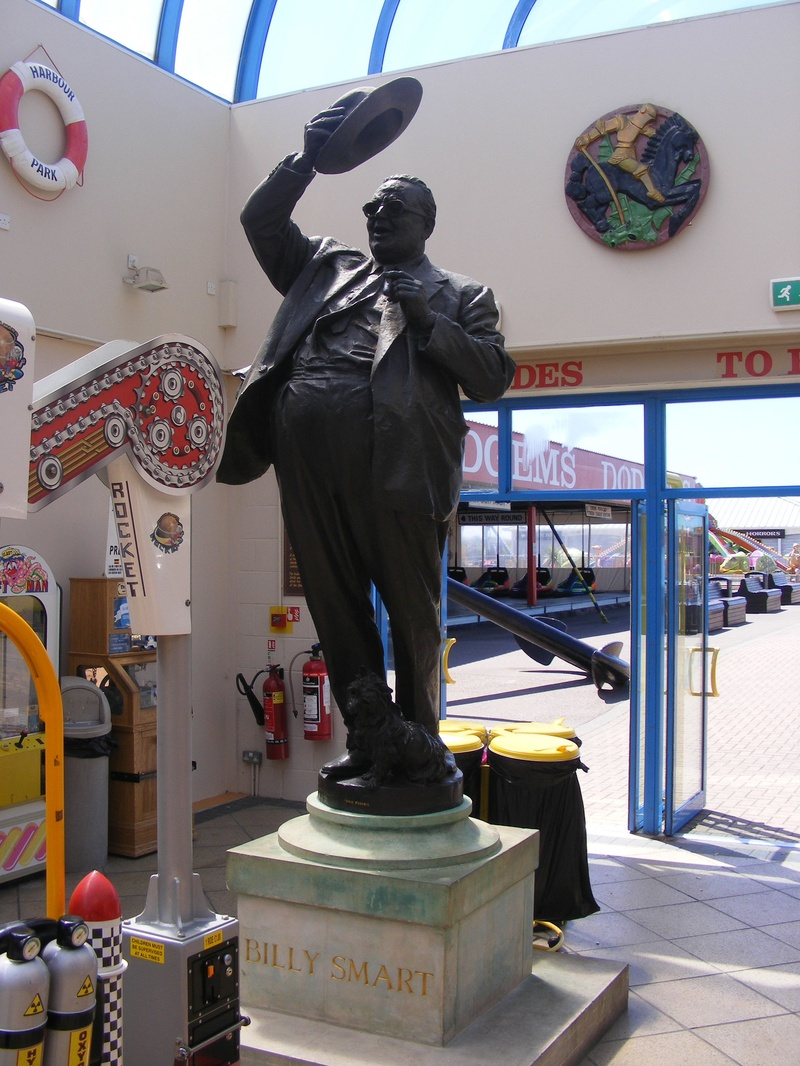
Bronze statue of Billy Smart that stands inside Harbour Park

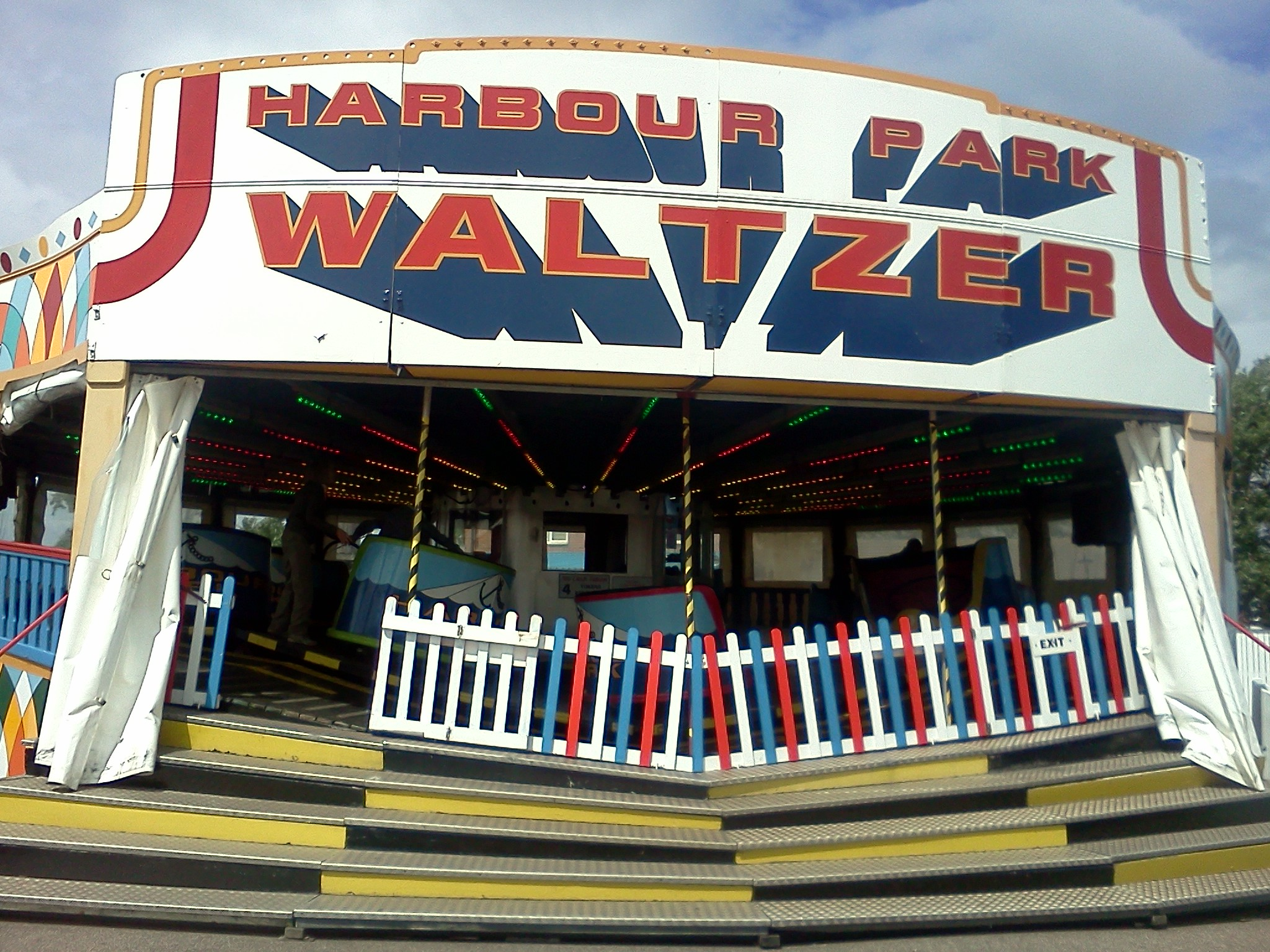
The Harbour Park Waltzer (Now Whirlpool Waltzer)

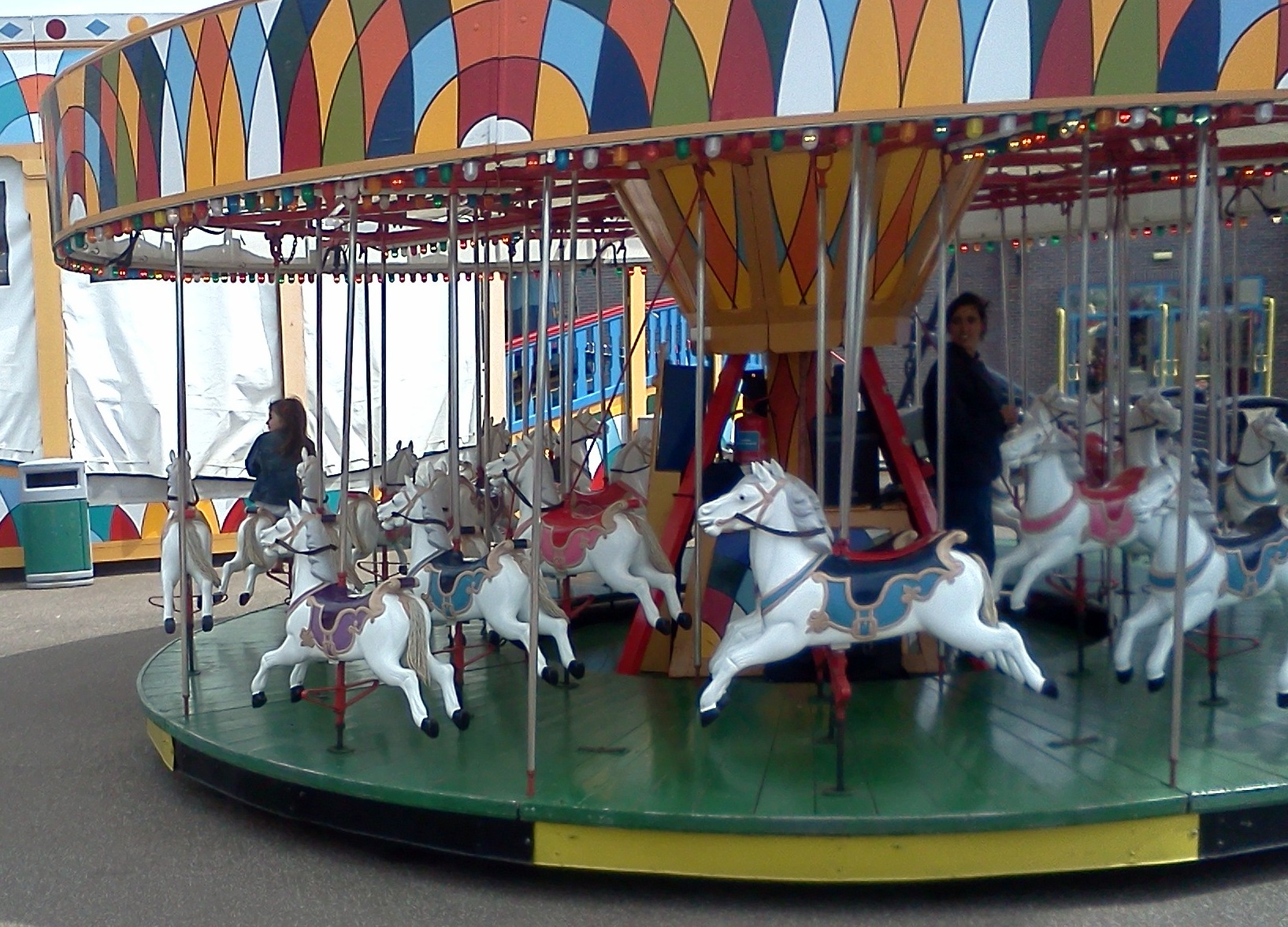
The Carousel (Former)

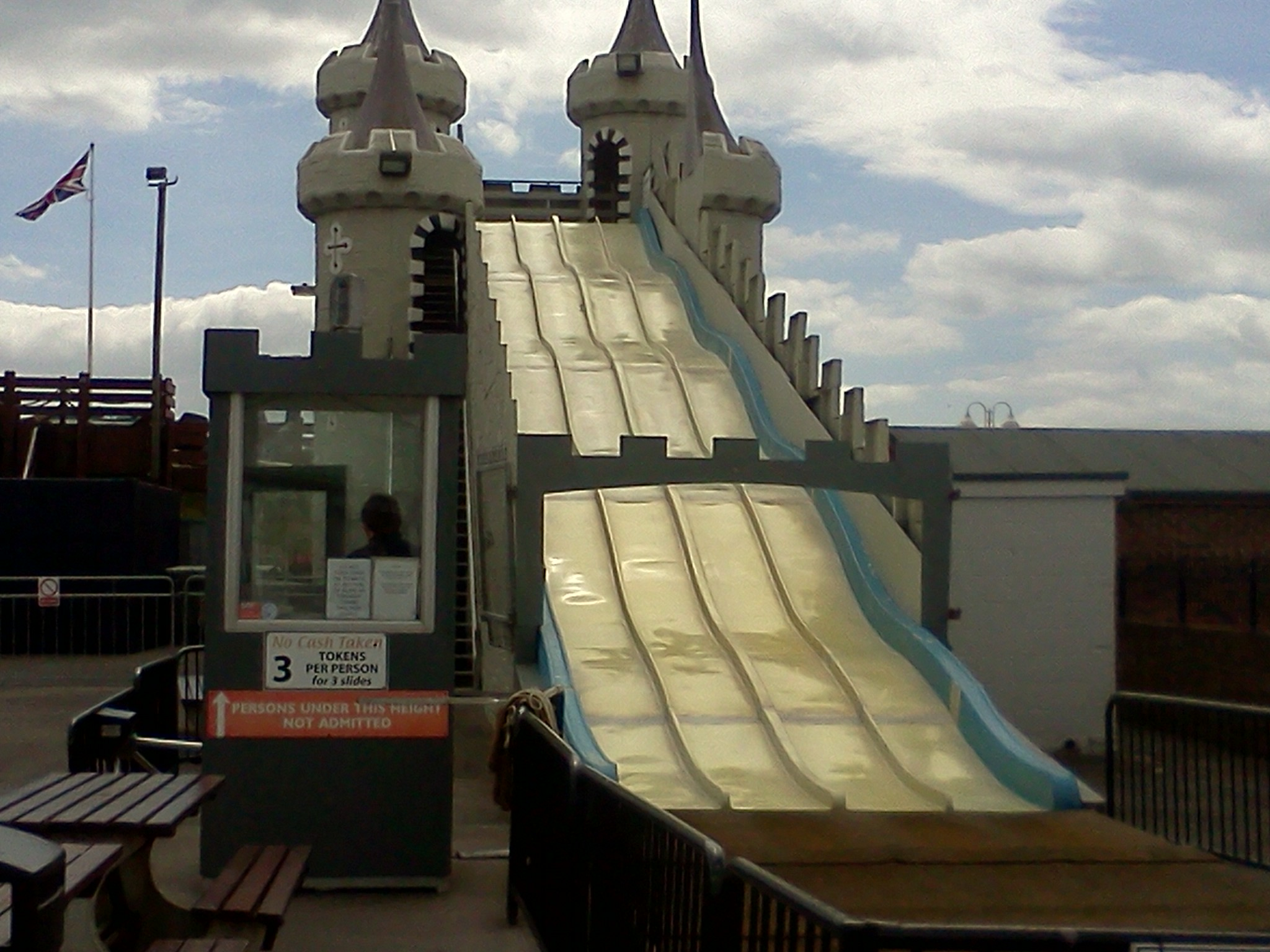
The Castle Slide

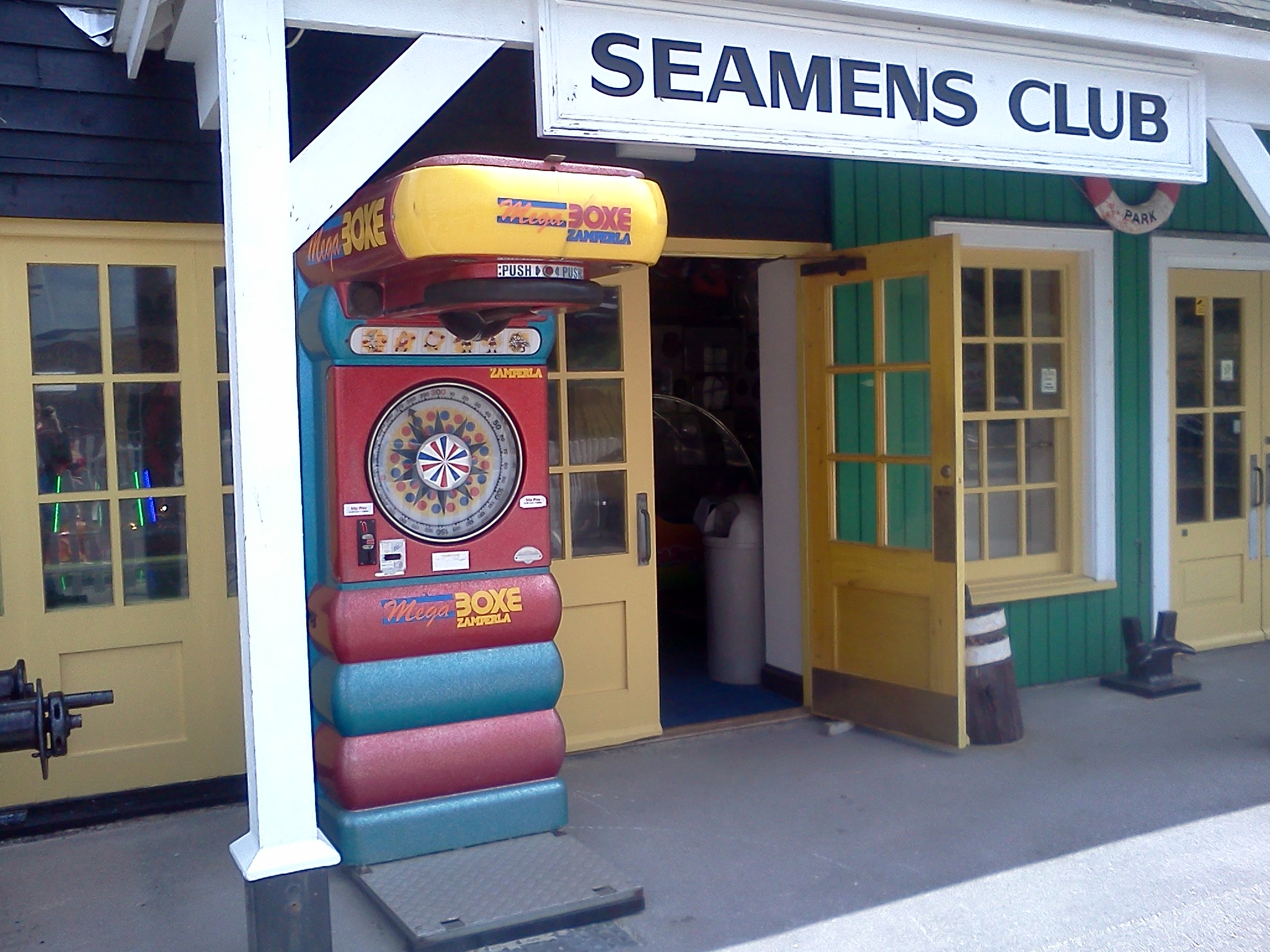
Seamens Club Arcade

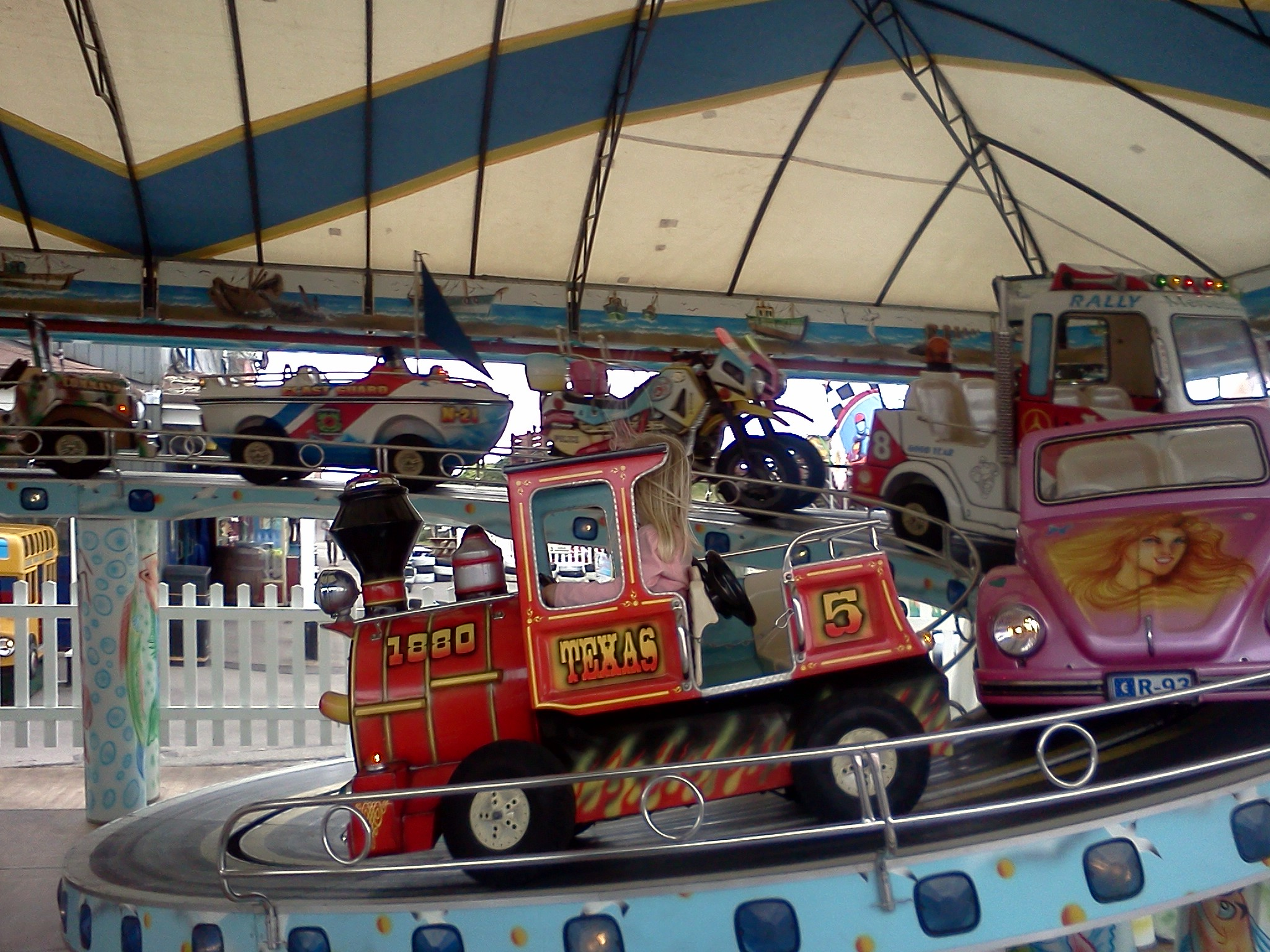
Formula one circuit ride

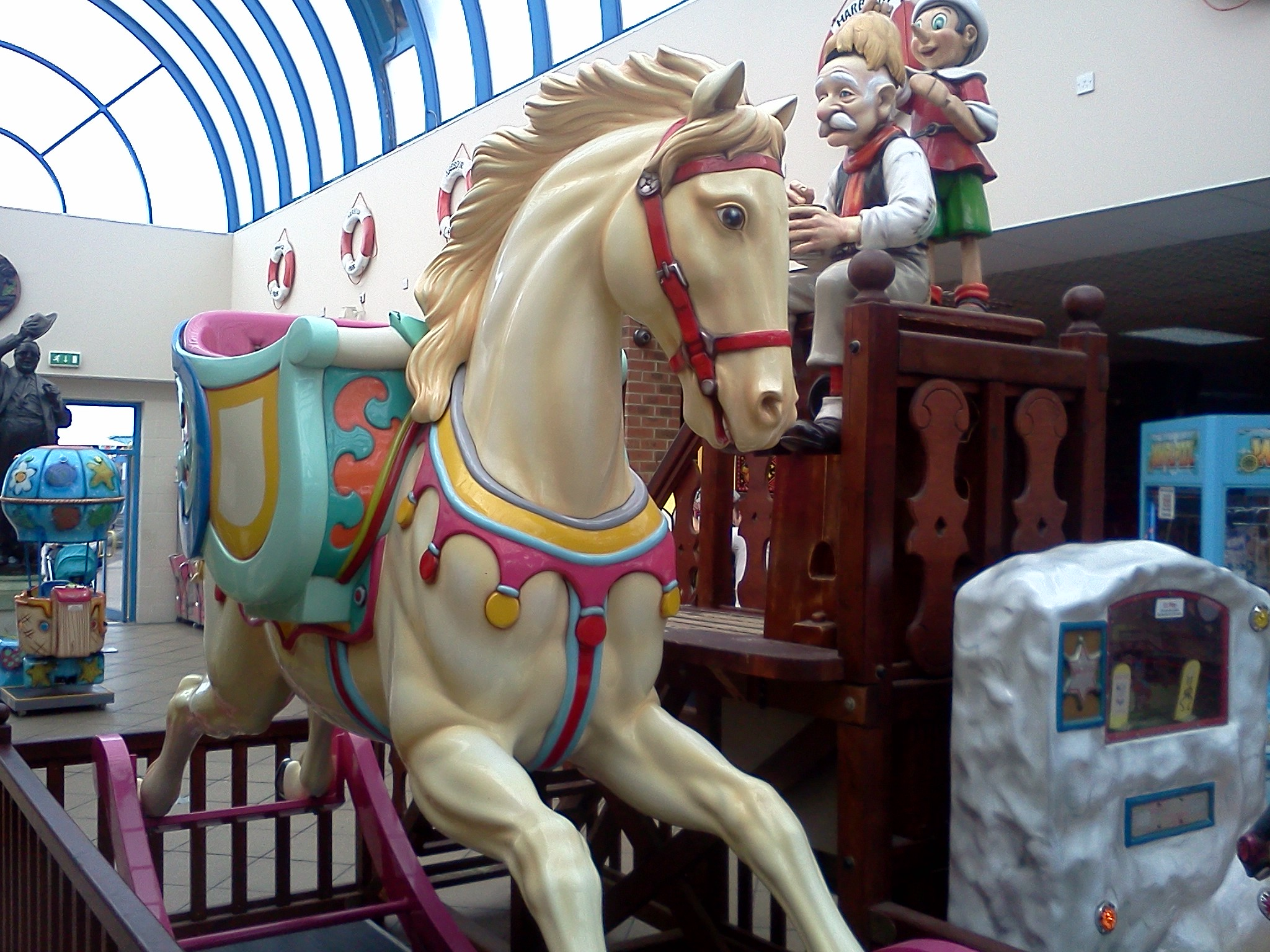
One of the indoor rides (Note: This ride is now outside, next to the little kids racing circuit.)
