= Jump and Smile =

Fairground ride

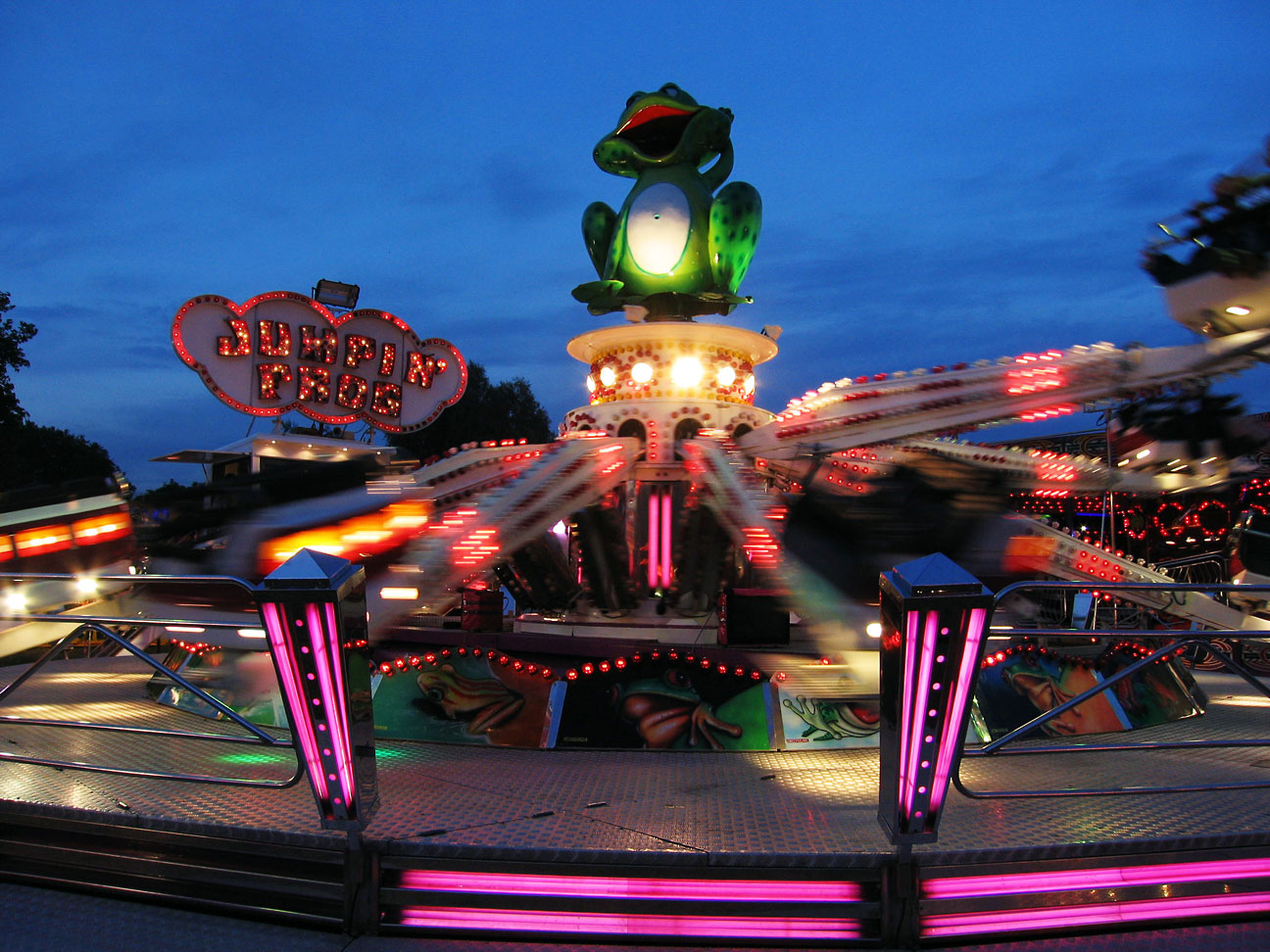
Jumpin Frog, a Jump & Smile made by Safeco

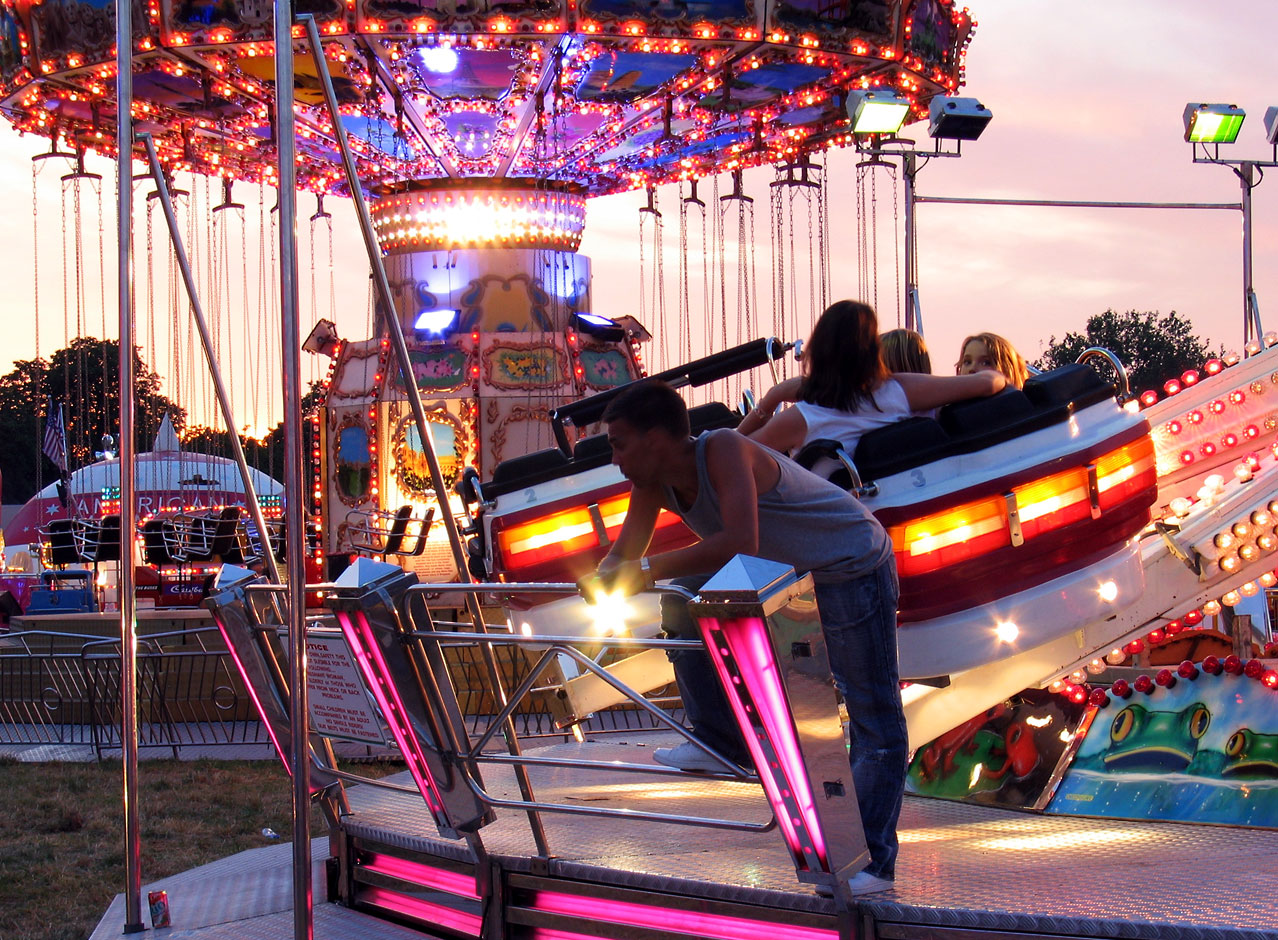
Jumpin Frog car detail.

The Jump & Smile is a type of fairground ride which consists of gondolas arranged on a number of radial arms around a central axis. As the central axis rotates, the arms are lifted into the air using compressed air cylinders at pseudo-random intervals, providing an erratic jumping motion. Most versions of the ride have preloaded patterns which the arms can move in, leading to an eye-catching display. Notable Jump & Smile manufactures include Sartori, Safeco, PWS, SBF Visa and Fabbri.

== Variants ==
=== Standard ===
A standard Jump & Smile has 12 arms each holding one three-person gondola. Riders are secured by a simple lap bar. These rides have become extremely popular in Europe, particularly the models offered by Safeco, Sartori and PWS.

=== Floorless ===
A floorless Jump & Smile has 12 arms each holding one two-person floorless gondola. Unlike the regular Jump & Smile, the arms are at a higher angle so that the gondolas have enough room to not crash into the floor. The gondolas on these rides can also usually rotate freely. Riders are secured by over-the-shoulder restraints. Examples of these rides are the Fabbri Smashing Jump, the Sartori Roto Techno and the Safeco Hang-Jump.
