= Bulldog Coaster (Brean Leisure Park) =

Roller coaster

- Previously known as Shock Wave, Crazy Loop

Brean Leisure Park
- Location: Brean Leisure Park
- Coordinates: 51°17′10″N 3°00′32″W
- Status: Operating
- Opening date: 2023

General statistics
- Type: Steel
- Manufacturer: Pinfari
- Model: TL59
- Lift/launch system: Chain lift hill
- Inversions: 1 (loop)
- Capacity: 960 riders per hour
- Bulldog Coaster at RCDB

Bulldog Coaster, formerly named Shock Wave or Crazy Loop is a roller coaster at Brean Leisure Park in Brean, Somerset, England. The ride, which was manufactured by Italian company Pinfari, features a loop, sharp turns and near support misses.

== Ride description ==
After exiting the station, the train makes a large right turn and then travels up a chain lift hill. It gently trundles around a curve at the top of the hill. The train then violently dips downwards. A ratchet that is in place to prevent roll backs precedes a short straight section. After this straight section, there is another smaller dip. The train takes another trundle round a corner, then travels gently downwards; the train picks up speed before hitting a banked corner. The train then travels through a loop, this is followed by a sharp corner. The train then rolls up and the brakes are only slightly applied. The train travels around more corners, followed by a small bump, then up and into the brake run at the end of the ride.

== History ==
Crazy Loop was originally at Flamingo Land and also had time at Pleasure Island Family Theme Park, Cleethorpes (where it was known as Crazy Loop), before subsequently being transferred to Brean in 2004, where it was given a new name, "Shockwave". In 2014 the ride was renamed back to "Crazy Loop". In 2021, it was renamed "Bulldog Coaster." It is currently closed and will return in the park's peak season.
