= Kongeparken =

Amusement park in Norway

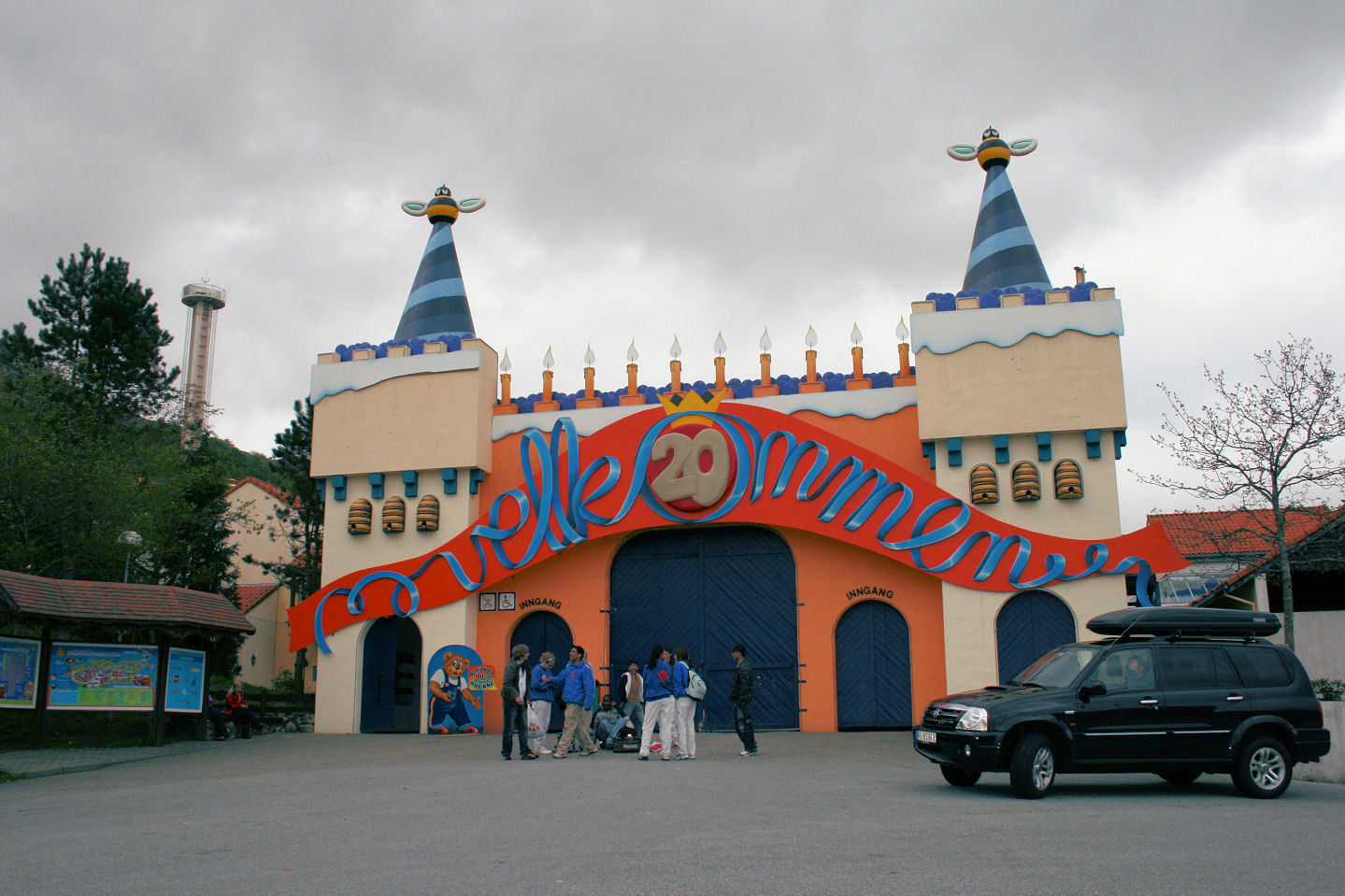
- Kongeparken entrance in 2007
- Interactive map of Kongeparken
- Location: Ålgård, Norway
- Coordinates: 58°46′43″N 5°50′26″E
- Status: Operating
- Opened: 16 May 1986
- Owner: Lund family
- Operated by: Rogaland Fritidspark AS
- Theme: Bears

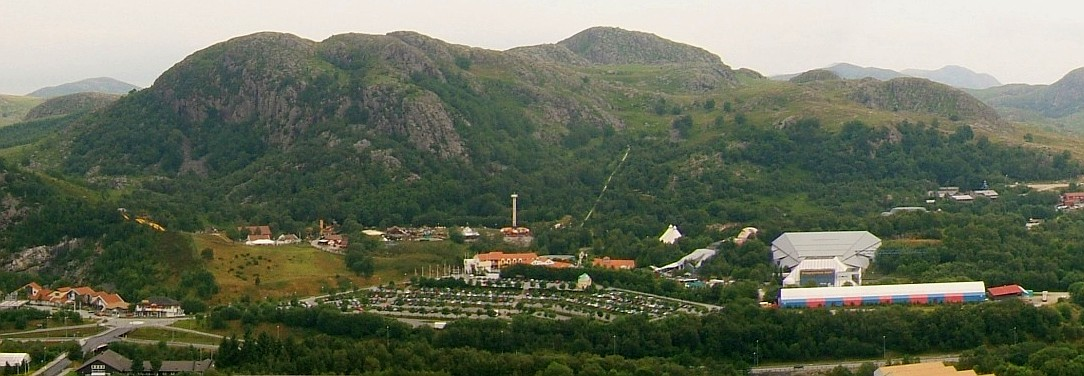
Kongeparken in 2005

Kongeparken (The King's Park) is an amusement park in the village of Ålgård, near Stavanger in Norway. Kongeparken is the biggest amusement park in the south-west of Norway, and the main tourist destination in the county of Rogaland. The park has more than 50 different rides and attractions. and has won multiple awards.

== History ==
Kongeparken was opened by Gabriel Ålgård in May 1986 and intended to be a park with outdoor activities such as BMX, roller-skating and golf. Construction cost about 220 million Norwegian kroner. Kongeparken had more than 200,000 visitors in its opening year but was bankrupt by July. In 1997, the park was bought by its current owners, the Lund family, who had more than a hundred years experience through the Lunds Tivoli amusement parks. The Lund family added new themes and increased activities, reversing a decline in visitor numbers. Kongeparken is owned and operated by Rogaland Fritidspark AS. Haakon Lund, the son of Bjoern and Veslemoey Lund, is currently in charge.

== Bears theme ==
The Lund family incorporated a bear theme into Kongeparken. In the late 1800s, Håkon Jæger Lund, the great-grandfather of Håkon Lund, was one of the first to introduce teddy bears to Norway. This was due to his experience in the carnival industry. His great-grandsons were further inspired to incorporate bears into the theme following a trip to Canada. The brothers visited a children's hospital that used teddy bears as tools to demonstrate to the children what they were going to do to them. After the visit, the Lund brothers put on a winter fair, and made a teddy bear hospital where they repaired and treated more than 2,000 bears within the first hour. Students from local hospitals would administer the treatment.

While this was two years prior to purchasing the park, bears have continued on to be present throughout the park. The park has two main royal bear mascots, named Brumle and Brumleline, the King and Queen of Bears.

== Rides and adventures ==
Kongeparken is targeted at children aged from three to 12 years old but also has more challenging activities for older children. The park has more than 50 rides, along with restaurants and other attractions. New rides are introduced each year, such as the Fossen water ride in 2013. Other attractions include a bobsleigh track, a do-it-yourself chocolate factory, and a children's fire station.

== Christmas in Kongeparken ==
Jul i Kongeparken (Christmas in Kongeparken) is held in November and December and features fairy lights, Christmas trees, elves, carol singing and family workshops.

== Attractions and rides ==
Opened	Name	Type	Height Limit	Status	Information	Producer
1986	Ormen Lange (The Long Serpent)	Bobsleigh	140 cm (90 cm with adult)	Renewed 2007	The bobsleigh Ormen Lange is 1000 meter long, making it the longest Bobsleigh in Norway.	Wiegand, Germany
1986	Gulliver	Climbing structure	No limit	Was given away in 2013	A themed climbing structure, built in the shape of Gulliver the giant.	Hags, Sweden
1986	Kapteinskolen (The School of Captains)	Motorized boats	140 cm (90 cm with adult)	Currently in use	Motorized boats, the children can drive themselves.	Engine; Honda, boat; Foster, both from the US.
Before 1997	Plogen (The Plow)	Bumpercars	130 cm (90 cm with adult)	Sold to Sweden in 2011	Traditional bumbercars	Preston & Barbieri, Italy
Before 1997	Gårdsskyting (The Farm shooting)	Game	No limit	Renewed in 2010	A shooting game, with a farm theme.	Tornado, UK
Before 1997	Zyklon	Roller coaster		Removed, sold to France	A transportable roller coaster.	Pinfari, Italy
Before 1997	Dyrene i Afrika (The Animals of Africa)	Carousel	No limit	Currently in use	Rotating animals and vehicles, suitable for all ages.	S&W, UK
Before 1997	Gravemaskinene (The Excavators)	Mini excavators	No limit	Currently in use, renewed in 2011	Mini excavators for children and adults.	Norway
1997	Grizzly	Roller coaster, model ZL42		Removed in 1999	A transportable roller coaster with a loop.	Pinfari, Italia
1997	Kakaokoppene (The Cocoacups)	Carousel	No limit	Currently in use	Rotating cocoa cups.	S&W, UK
1997	Brumletoget (The Bear Train)	Mini railway	No limit	Currently in use	A miniature train, with carriages for the children. This was the first attraction bought by the Lund family for the opening of the park in 1997.	Zamperla, Italy
1997	Bjørneløypa (The Bear Track)	Gocart track	90 cm, max 140 cm	Currently in use	A gocart track where the children can drive for themselves.	Formula K
1997	Humla (The Bumblebee)	Troika	120 cm	In storage as of July 2023.	Norway's largest carousel, originally moved from Alton Towers.	HUSS Park Attractions, Germany
1997	Marihøna (The Ladybug)	Carousel	No limit	Removed 2019	Colourful carousel for all ages.	Zamperla, Italy
1997	Ballongen (The Balloon)	Carousel	No limit	Removed 2011	Children's ride with colourful balloons.	Zamperla, Italy
1998	Freia Sjokoladefabrikk (The Chocolate Factory)	Interactive show	90 cm, max 12 years	Currently in use, shows throughout the day in the openinghours of the park.	The Chocolate Factory: A small chocolate factory, only for children. The children learn about chocolate, its origin, and how it is produced. They get to make their own chocolate to enjoy. Adults can attend the last show of the day. Free tickets in the Bamsebotell in the park.	Kongeparken, Norway
1998	Svalbard Ekspressen (The Svalbard Express)	Roller coaster	90 cm	Currently in use.	The first themed roller coaster in Norway.	Vekoma, Netherlands
1999	Roller Coaster	Zyklon		Removed in 2001	A transportable roller coaster	Pinfari, Italy
2000	Bamsebotell (The Teddy Bear Hotel)	A teddybear hotel and souvenir shop	No limit	Currently in use	A hotel where the teddybears can relax and enjoy while the owners are visiting the park. Also a souvenir shop with a lot of different items and clothing articles, and a lobbystop, that is a kiosk with a lot of different sweets.	Kongeparken, Norway
2001	Grizzly 2	Zyklon ZL 42		Removed in 2003	A transportable rollercoaster, with a loop.	Pinfari, Italy
2001	Kongeraften (The King's Rafting)	Waterslide	130 cm, 90 cm with adults, max 110 kg	Currently in use	Waterslide where guests sit in a boat down the ride, it is possible to be two people in one boat.	Metabau, Germany
2002	MegaSplash (The Big Splash)	A jumping boat	140 cm, 90 cm with adult	Currently in use	A boat that is thrown ut in the air and lands in the water.	Heege, Germany
2002	Stjerneskudd (The Shooting Star)	A free fall bungy		Only in use for the 2002 season	In a bungy, two people are dropped in free fall.	Fabri, Italy
2002	BrumleBand (The Bear Band)	A teddybear show	No limit	Removed 2019	A teddybear show for the children. Here you meet the local bear Bjørnulf, the singer Ferdinand, the Paris-madam Mimi, the explorer Ranja and The hotel manager Bastian. Currently in storage.	Norway
2003	Fabeldyrene (The Fairytale Animals)	Carousel	90 cm, max 12 years	Removed 2013	Made by the artist Oscar Wiese for the 2003 EXPO in Switzerland.	Doppelmayr, Switzerland
2003	Svanesjøen (The Swan Lake)	Pedal boats shaped like swans		Removed in 2007	Swanshaped boats for the guests to enjoy the waterside.	
2003	Luftskipet (The Airship)	Carousel	90 cm	Currently in use	Norway's tallest carousel, which stretches 32 meters in the air	Sanoyas Hishino Meisho, Japan
2004	Helspinn (The Full Spinn)	Carousel	90 cm	Currently in use	Spinning cups, where you can decide what speed to rotate.	Originally from Sanoyas Hishino Meisho, Japan, bought in France.
2004	Fuji Smil Med Meg (Fuji Smile With Me)	Free 3D camera rental	No limit	Currently in use	Free use of 3D cameras from Fuji, the ability to obtain images digitally, or printed directly in the park.	Partnership between Kongeparken and Fujifilm Norway
2004	Lag en venn (Make a Friend)	Build a bear	No limit	Currently in use	Make yourself a friend, a teddy bear or soft toy, children can decide whether it should be hard or soft, large or small, clothing, eye color and much more. A big heart and a personal birth certificate is also included.	Developed by Kongeparken
2005	Storm (The Storm)	Tilt a whirl ride	120 cm, 90 cm with adult	Currently in use	Spinning shells placed in the water, themed around Captain Storms sinking ship. bought in France.	Originally from Sanoyas Hishino Meisho, Japan, bought in France together with Helspinn.
2005	Redningssentralen (The Rescue Center)	Cable car	125 cm, max 100 kg	Currently in use	Cable car where you are thrown out over the pond.	Heege, Germany
2005	Borte Vekk (The Long Gone)	Climbing structure	No limit	Currently in use	Climbing structure and playground for the children.	Haags
2006	Nordavinden (The North Wind)	Gravitron-Starship	125 cm	Currently in use,	Themed around the story of the boy who went to the North Wind to regain his flour. The guests are exposed to 2G, and everything happens in a tremendous speed., Closed in 2020 - 2021 for infection control measures.	Kongeparken, ARM (Wisdom Rides)
2007	Høydeskrekk (Scared of heights)	Climbing trail	130 cm, max 100 kg	Currently in use	Climbing Trail running up to 13 meters above the ground. Children and adults can challenge themselves and climb through the suspension bridges and go walk on lines. One of a kind in northern Europe.	Kongeparken
2007	Redningsskøyta (The Rescue Ship)	Carousel	130 cm, 100 cm with adult	Currently in use	Themed carousel, fits 2 people, the passenger can steer the boat while the carousel goes around.	Zierer, Germany
2008	Bukkerittet (The Buck Ride)	Spinning Mouse, Rollercoaster with rotating gondolas	120 cm	Currently in use2	Themed roller coaster with spinning gondolas, this is unprecedented in Norway. Can attain a speed of about 70 km / h and the guests are exposed to nearly 2.5 G.	Reverchon Industries, France.
2008	Bamsehulene (The Bear Caves)	Play area for the children, outside	No limit	Currently in use	First launched as Growing up green in 2008, during Stavanger as the European Capital of Culture project in 2008.	Kongeparken and landscape architecture students from all over Europe
2009	Vepsen (The Wasp)	Boomerang, original Frisbee (ride), Pendulum ride	130 cm	Currently in use	A pendulum type attraction where both the gondola and shuttle goes around, 360 degree rotation, 15 meters above the ground, 3.5 G.	Fabbri Group, Italy
2009	Lorta-Lars	Animated person who tells the local dialect	No limit	Currently in use	Lorta-Lars is situated in the front of Jærgården. His monologues are written by the Jæren author Tobias Skretting, and the voice is borrowed from Ingar Lode.	Kongeparken, Norway
2010	Tiltetårnet (The Tilt Tower)	Tilt tower	125 cm, 110 cm with adults	Currently in use	Tilt Tower where you get shot in the air and dropped down again. The first of its kind in Scandinavia.	ABC Rides, Switzerland
2010	Sverd i Sten (Sword in the Stone)	Interactive show, outdoors	No limit	Currently in use	One of a kind attraction, pull out the sword from the stone and you'll be king for a day. Closed 2020 - 2021 for infection control measures.	Kongeparken
2010	Kongen på haugen (The King on the Hill)	A climbing mountain for children	No limit	Currently in use	Climbingmountain built over the restaurant Den Glade Rustning	Metabau, Germany
2011	Barnas Brannstasjon (The Children's Fire Station)	Interactive show	90 cm, max 12 years	Currently in use	The Children's Fire Station: Interactive show where kids learn fire safety in the home and can attempt to put out a fire, the attraction was awarded the THEA awards in 2011, for the world's best attraction with a limited budget. Concept and production developed by Kongeparken. Other suppliers: Metallbau Emmeln, GW Group, Visiual Terrain, Kool Fog, Sigma Services & Alcorn McBride	Kongeparken
2011	Bamsespinn (The Bearspinn)	Carousel	No limit	Currently in use	Original name: The Bear Affair, spinning, giant Bears, suitable for everyone.	Sellner Manufacturing, US
2011	Brannbåtene (The Fireboats)	Remote controlled boats	No limit	New in 2011	Themed as fire boats, remote controlled, launched together with the Children's Fire Station in 2011.	Tornado
2011	Kræsjebilene (The Crashcars)	Bumbercars	130 cm, 90 cm with adult	Replaced Plogen in 2011	Themed bumper cars, designed specifically for Kongeparken.	Design of cars and houses by Kongeparken
2012	Spinnvidle (The Crazy Spinner)	Swing ride	120 cm, 100 cm with adult	Currently in use	First swing ride in Norway with double seating.	Zierer, Germany
2013	Fossen (The Waterfall)	Log flume (ride)	140 cm, 90 cm with adult	Currently in use	First of its kind in Scandinavia, with gondolas shaped like bathtubs. A 4 minutes long water ride where you get really wet if you sit in the wrong place in the bathtub. Here it goes forwards and backwards down wild rapids	Kongeparken, ride structure: ABC Engineering
2014	Sætra					
2015						

Source: Kongparken, Errors might occur.

== Awards ==
Kongeparken has won many awards in Norway and internationally.

- In 2012: The Children's Fire Station (Barnas Brannstasjon) won the THEA Awards for best new attraction!.
- In 2012: Kongeparken got top score (6/6) by the Norwegian newspaper VG.
- In 2011: Kongeparken got top score (6/6) by the Norwegian newspaper Dagbladet.
- In 2010: Kongeparken was the biggest attraction in Rogalands, Norway, with 215 303 visitors.
- In 2009 and 2010: Kongeparken got a score of 5/6 by the Norwegian newspaper Dagbladet.
- In 2008: Kongeparken was named one of the two best amusement parks in Norway by the national newspaper Dagbladet.
- In 2006: Spirit Award for the best leadership training program. The prize is awarded in the U.S.
- In 2005: Rogaland Travel Award.
- In 2004: Brass Ring Award for best print advertising in a park with 250 000 visitors. The prize is awarded in the U.S.
- Pony Award. The prize is awarded in Italy.

== Visitors ==
1986: 215,000 visitors

1997: 40,000 visitors

2009: 199,451 visitors

2010: 215,203 visitors

2011: 203,673 visitors

2012: 213,365 visitors

2013: 230,434 visitors

2014: 254,629 visitors

2015: 259,113 visitors

2016: 251,340 visitors

2017: 246,313 visitors

2018: 248,467 visitors
