= Looping Star (Clacton Pier) =

Steel roller coaster in Clacton-on-Sea, England

- The Looping Star in 2026

Clacton Pier
- Location: Clacton Pier
- Coordinates: 51.7864°N 1.1550°W
- Status: Operating
- Opening date: 23 October 2021

General statistics
- Type: Steel
- Manufacturer: Pinfari
- Model: ZL42
- Lift/launch system: Chain Lift
- Height: 11 m (36 ft)
- Length: 365 m (1,198 ft)
- Inversions: 1
- Duration: 1:17
- Height restriction: 52 in (132 cm)
- Trains: 2 trains with 3 cars; riders arranged 2 across in 2 rows for a total of 12 riders per train
- Looping Star at RCDB

Looping Star is a steel roller coaster located at Clacton Pier in Clacton-on-Sea, Essex manufactured by Pinfari. It was formerly located at Codona's Amusement Park in Aberdeen, Scotland.

It was the park's only ride with an inversion, built on top of the mini-golf and restaurant. It replaced the Galaxi roller coaster, which was moved to Loudoun Castle amusement park (now defunct). The ride used to have three trains, but after 2010 the ride operated 2 trains, then some point in 2017 The coaster operated just 1 train (the other two are sitting on the transfer track). They use the newer Pinfari trains, which can be seen on rides built from the mid 1990s onwards.

The Looping Star has now been moved to Clacton Pier, where it was intended to be assembled and open for the 2020 summer season, however, as a result of damage from Storm Ciara, it was opened on 23 October 2021 instead.
