= Frisbee (ride) =

Type of pendulum amusement ride

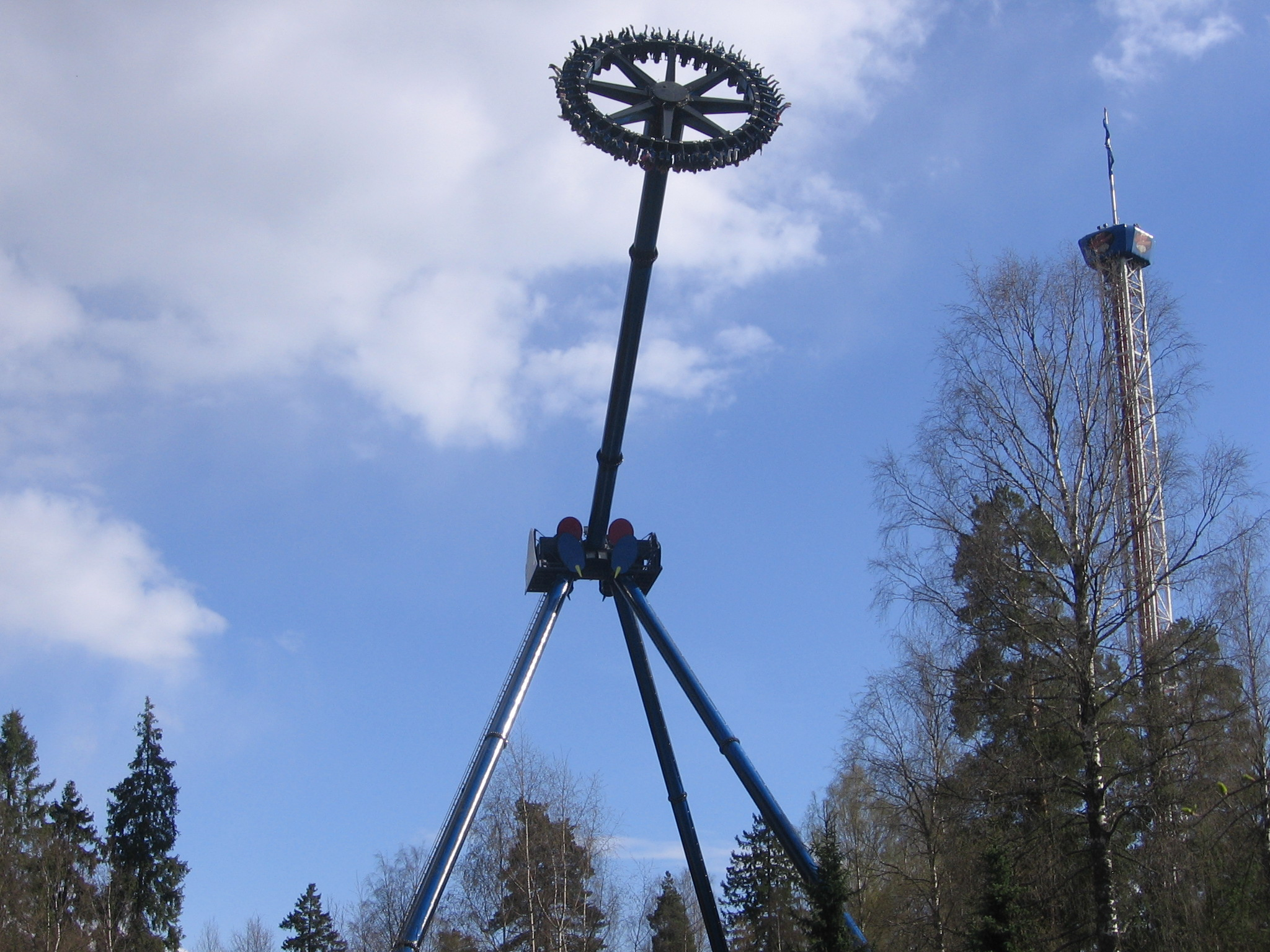
Zamperla's giant discovery model, SpinSpider, at TusenFryd, Norway

The Frisbee is a type of pendulum amusement ride featuring a circular gondola that rotates as it swings back and forth. Riders are seated on the gondola facing inward or outward, depending on the model. On some models, the entire pendulum makes a full 360 degree swing.

== Design and operation ==
A pendulum is suspended between two support frames. Attached to the base of this pendulum is a circular gondola. Riders are seated in the gondola, facing either inwards or outwards. When the ride cycle starts, the gondola begins to rotate. In addition, the pendulum arm begins to swing through an arc, maxing out between 120° and 360° (full revolution). Most parks require riders to be at least 48 inches (120 cm) tall.

== Variants ==
Manufacturer	Model	Riders	Seating	Swing	Height	Speed
Chance Rides	Revolution	20–32	Inward	120°	16.4 m (54 ft) - 19.6 m (64 ft)	
Fabbri Group	Boomerang	32	Inward		15 m (49 ft)	
Fabbri Group	Space Jam	24	Inward		22 m (72 ft)	
Fabbri Group	Top Swing	24–30	Outward	110°	24 m (79 ft)	31.4 mph (50 km/h)
HUSS Park Attractions	Frisbee	40	Either	180°	20 m (66 ft)	
HUSS Park Attractions	Frisbee XL	40	Outward	260°	36 m (118 ft)	
HUSS Park Attractions	Giant Frisbee	40–50	Outward	240°	43 m (141 ft)	68 mph (110 km/h)
Intamin	Gyro Swing	32	Outward	240°	25 m (82 ft)	47 mph (75 km/h)
Intamin	Giant Gyro Swing	40	Outward	240°	42.2 m (138 ft)	61 mph (98 km/h)
Jiuhua Rides	Super Pendulum	54	Outward	220°	26 m (85 ft)	
KMG	Afterburner (a.k.a. Fireball)	24-32	Inward	240°	19.812 m (65.00 ft)	
KMG	Freak Out (ride)	16	Inward	240°	21 m (69 ft)	
KMG	XXL	20	Inward	240°	40 m (130 ft)	
KMG	Sicko	24	Rotating	240°	30 m (98 ft)	
KMG	Inversion 12	12	Outward	360°	24 m (79 ft)	
KMG	Inversion 24	24	Outward	360°	62 m (203 ft)	
Luna-Park Rides	Extreme	20	Inward	120°	20 m (66 ft)	
Mondial	Revolution	40–50	Outward	240°	35 m (115 ft)	54 mph (88 km/h)
Moser's Rides	Sidewinder	24–40	Outward	240°		
Moser's Rides	Sidewinder 12	12	Outward			
SBF Visa Group	Dance Party	40	Inward	180°		
SBF Visa Group	Maxi Dance Party	24	Outward	240°	27 m (89 ft)	37 mph (59.2 km/h)
SBF Visa Group	Maxi Dance Party 360	24	Outward	360°	33 m	
Technical Park	Street Fighter	16	Inward	240°	18 m (59 ft)	
Technical Park	Street Fighter Revolution	16	Inward	360°	21 m (69 ft)	
Technical Park	Typhoon	16–30	Outward	240°	30 m (98 ft)	
Technical Park	Typhoon 360	16–30	Outward	360°	33 m (108 ft)	
Zamperla	Discovery	30	Outward	240°	21 m (69 ft) - 26 m (85 ft)	
Zamperla	Discovery Revolution	16–30	Outward	360°	18 m (59 ft) - 30 m (98 ft)	
Zamperla	Giga Discovery	40	Outward	260°	52.5 m (172 ft)	75 mph (120 km/h)
Zamperla	Giant Discovery	40	Outward	240°	44.8 m (147 ft)	68 mph (110 km/h)
Zamperla	Mini Discovery	16	Outward	240°	15.5 m (51 ft)	
Zamperla	Nitro	20	Inward	200°	15 m (49 ft)	

=== UltraMax ===
The UltraMax is a type of amusement ride manufactured by Mondial which is like the HUSS Frisbee however passengers face outwards and are sitting one of the four seats on one of the six gondolas as the ride gets higher momentum and eventually starts going upside down. The ride is built with one arm with two supports and then the arm with the gondolas attached. It also uses the same harness as the ones used on the Top Scans.

== Installations ==
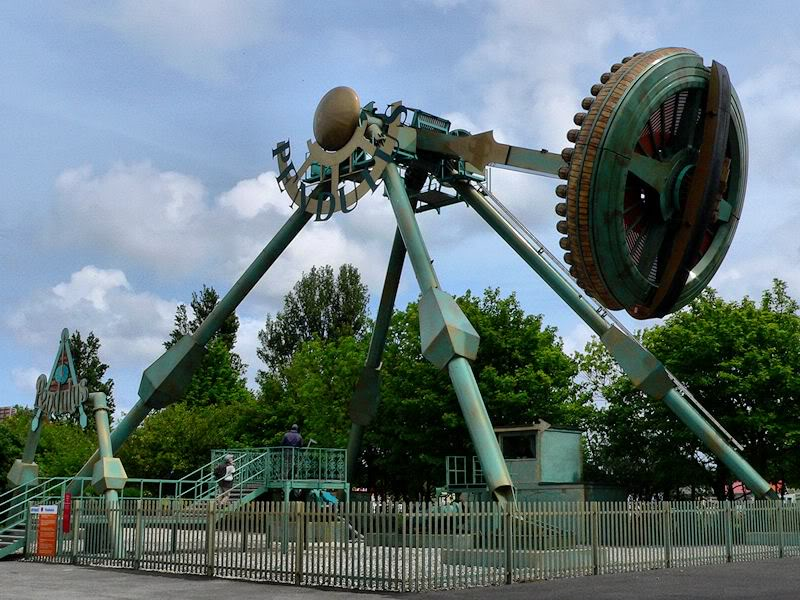
Pendulus at Pleasure Island, Cleethorpes

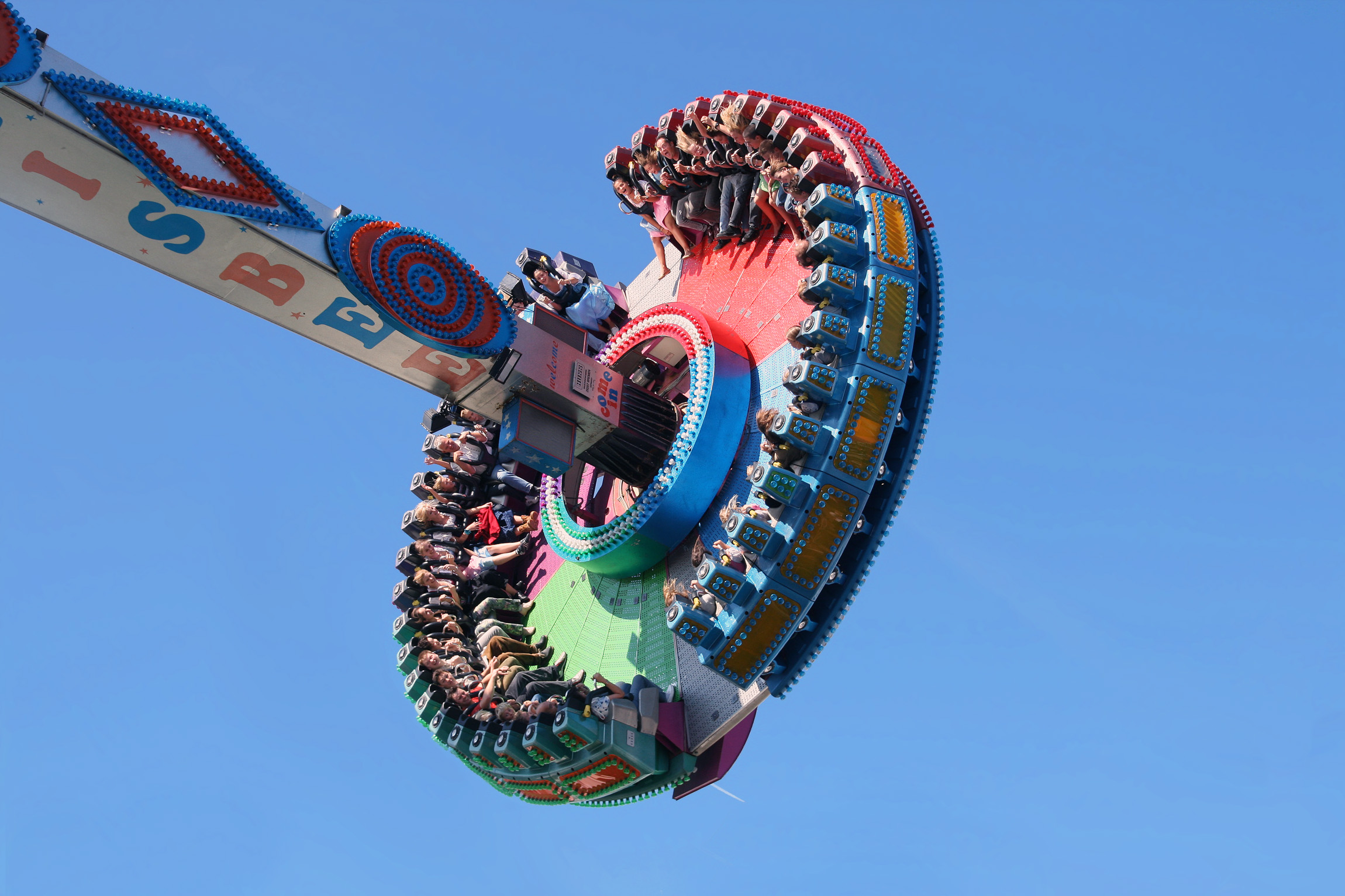
Celebrants at Octoberfest, some in traditional German dress

* Rotator at Emerald Park does not go full 360° anymore due to people getting sick on it.

Name	Park	Location	Manufacturer	Model	Opened	Status
Apollo Wheel	Happy Valley Beijing	China	Huss	Giant Frisbee	Unknown	Operating
Aztec Swing	Energylandia	Poland	SBF Visa Group	Maxi Dance Party	Unknown	Operating
Beach Blaster	Belmont Park	United States	Chance Rides	Revolution 20	Unknown	Operating
Beach Party	Coney Beach Pleasure Park	United Kingdom	KMG	Afterburner	Unknown	Operating
Blizzard	Kumdori Land	South Korea	Zamperla	Discovery	Unknown	Removed
Crazy Flywheel	Jin Jiang Action Park	China	Zamperla	Discovery	Unknown	Operating
Discovery	Dream Park	Egypt	Unknown	Unknown	Unknown	Operating
Discovery Revolution	Wiener Prater	Austria	Zamperla	Discovery Revolution	Unknown	Operating
Freakout	Botton's Pleasure Beach	United Kingdom	KMG	Freak Out	Unknown	Operating
Freak Out	Poor Jack Amusements	United States	KMG	Freak Out	Unknown	Operating
Free Swing	Tongdo Fantasia	South Korea	Huss	Frisbee	Unknown	SBNO
Frisbee	Nagashima Spa Land	Japan	Huss	Frisbee	Unknown	SBNO
Hurricane	Beijing Shijingshan Amusement Park	China	Beijing Shibaolai Amusement Equipment	Unknown	Unknown	Operating
Side Winder	Adventure Island	India	Unknown	Unknown	Unknown	Operating
Sonic Twister	Galaxyland	Canada	Moser's Rides	Sidewinder 12	Unknown	Removed
Star Frisbee	Star City	Philippines	Unknown	Unknown	Unknown	Operating
Super Gyro Swing	Happy Valley Shanghai	China	Intamin	Gyro Swing	Unknown	Operating
The Rattler	Camden Park	United States	Unknown	Unknown	Unknown	Operating
Hurricane	Everland	South Korea	Huss	Frisbee	1996	Operating
La Máquina	Parque de Atracciones de Madrid	Spain	Huss	Frisbee	1997	Operating
Frisbee	Six Flags Fiesta Texas	United States	Huss	Frisbee	1998	Removed
Tasmanian Devil	Six Flags Discovery Kingdom	United States	Huss	Frisbee	1999	Removed
Tomahawk	Six Flags New England	United States	Huss	Frisbee	1999	Operating
Frisbee	Särkänniemi	Finland	Huss	Frisbee	2000	Removed
Side Kick; Formerly Blazing Saddles	Movie Park Germany	Germany	Huss	Frisbee	2000	Operating
Tomahawk	Walibi Holland	Netherlands	SBF Visa Group	Dance Party	2000	Operating
Vudú	Six Flags México	(Mexico) México	SBF Visa Group	Dance Party	2000	Removed
Gyro Swing	Lotte World	South Korea	Intamin	Gyro Swing	2001	Operating
Mad Mill	Duinrell	Netherlands	Huss	Frisbee	2001	Operating
Vortex	Thorpe Park	United Kingdom	KMG	Vortex	2001	Operating
Black Fly	West Midland Safari Park	United Kingdom	Fabbri Group	Boomerang	2002	Operating
Boomerang	Bosque Mágico Coca Cola	(Mexico) México	Fabbri Group	Boomerang	2002	Removed
Delirium	California's Great America	United States	Chance Rides	Revolution 32	2002	Operating
Maelstrom	Drayton Manor	United Kingdom	Intamin	Gyro Swing	2002	Operating
Psyclone	Canada's Wonderland	Canada	Mondial	Revolution	2002	Operating
Delirium	Kings Island	United States	Huss	Giant Frisbee	2003	Operating
Dreggen	Kristiansand Dyrepark	Norway	KMG	Afterburner	2003	Removed
Freak Out	Barry's Amusements	United Kingdom	KMG	Freak Out	2003	Removed
La Revolucion	Knott's Berry Farm	United States	Chance Rides	Revolution 32	2003	Operating
Manitou	La Ronde	Canada	Zamperla	Nitro	2003	Operating
The Claw	Hersheypark	United States	Chance Rides	Revolution 32	2003	Operating
Tornado	Gyeongju World	South Korea	Zamperla	Discovery	2003	Operating
Crazy Beach Party	Playland	Canada	Huss	Frisbee	2004	Removed
Eagle's Claw	Lightwater Valley	United Kingdom	KMG	Afterburner	2004	Removed
Giant Frisbee	Nagashima Spa Land	Japan	Huss	Giant Frisbee	2004	Operating
Revolution	Dorney Park & Wildwater Kingdom	United States	Chance Rides	Revolution 32	2004	operating
Sidewinder	Adventureland	United States	Moser's Rides	Sidewinder	2004	Operating
Sledge Hammer	Bobbejaanland	Belgium	Huss	Giant Frisbee	2004	Operating
SynKope	Terra Mítica	Spain	Mondial	Revolution	2004	Operating
The Claw	Dreamworld	Australia	Intamin	Gyro Swing	2004	Removed
Tondemina	Fuji-Q Highland	Japan	Huss	Giant Frisbee	2004	Operating
Typhoon 360	PowerPark	Finland	Technical Park	Typhoon 360	2004	Operating
maXair	Cedar Point	United States	Huss	Giant Frisbee	2005	Operating
Frisbee	Adventureland	United States	Huss	Frisbee	2006	Operating
Giant Discovery	China Dinosaurs Park	China	Zamperla	Giant Discovery	2006	Operating
Fandango	Knoebels Amusement Resort	United States	Moser's Rides	Sidewinder	2007	Operating
Flip Flop	Flamingo Land	United Kingdom	Fabbri Group	Top Swing	2007	Operating
Xtreme Frisbee	Canobie Lake Park	United States	Huss	Frisbee	2007	Operating
Super Frisbee	Europark Idroscalo Milano	Italy	Technical Park	Typhoon	2008	Operating
The Rattler	Wild Adventures	United States	Moser's Rides	Sidewinder	2008	Operating
SpinSpider	Tusenfryd	Norway	Zamperla	Giant Discovery	2009	Operating
Vepsen	Kongeparken	Norway	Fabbri Group	Boomerang	2009	Operating
Yukatan	Cavallino Matto	Italy	Technical Park	Typhoon	2009	Operating
Giant Discovery	Kaeson Youth Park	North Korea	Zamperla	Giant Discovery	2010	Operating
Luna 360	Luna Park	United States	Zamperla	Discovery Revolution	2010	Operating
Super Frisbee	Nova Nicolandia	Brazil	Technical Park	Typhoon	2010	Operating
Svend Svingarm	BonBon-Land	Denmark	Zamperla	Giant Discovery	2010	Operating
Eretic	Festyland	France	Zamperla	Discovery	2011	Operating
Giant Swing	Trans Studio Mini Bandung inside the Transmart Buah Batu Square	Indonesia	Zamperla	Discovery Revolution	2011	Operating
It	Morey's Piers	United States	KMG	Afterburner	2011	Operating
Nautilus	Drievliet	Netherlands	KMG	Afterburner	2011	Operating
Black Widow	Kennywood	United States	Zamperla	Giant Discovery	2012	Operating
The Rattler	Camden Park	United States	Zamperla	Discovery Revolution	2012	Operating
Thunder	Mirabilandia	Brazil	Technical Park	Typhoon	2012	Operating
Petir	JungleLand	Indonesia	Zamperla	Discovery	2013	Operating
Scream Machine	Adlabs Imagica	India	Zamperla	Giant Discovery	2013	Operating
SpinCycle	Silverwood Theme Park	United States	SBF Visa Group	Maxi Dance Party 360	2013	Operating
Extreme Supernova formerly Eclipse	Six Flags Great Escape; Luna Park	United States	Zamperla	Discovery	2014; 2010 to 2013	Operating
Rotator	Emerald Park	(Republic of Ireland) Ireland	SBF Visa	Maxi Dance Party 360*	2014	Operating
Stratosfear	Rainbow's End	New Zealand	Zamperla	Discovery Revolution	2014	Operating
Thor's Pendulum	Quancheng Euro Park	China	Unknown	Unknown	2014	Operating
Cyclos	Kentucky Kingdom	United States	Zamperla	Discovery Revolution	2015	Operating
The Beast	Playland	Canada	KMG	XXL	2015	Operating
The Riddler Revenge	Six Flags Over Texas	United States	Zamperla	Giant Discovery	2016	Operating
Mega Swing 360	E-World	South Korea	Zamperla	Discovery Revolution	2016	Operating
Delirium	Kings Dominion	United States	Mondial	Revolution	2016	Operating
X	Särkänniemi	Finland	Zamperla	Discovery Revolution	2016	Operating
Goliath	Adventure World	Australia	Intamin	Gyro Swing	2017	Operating
Loke	Liseberg	Sweden	Intamin	Gyro Swing	2017	Operating
Sky-Force; Formerly Pendulus	Flambards; Pleasure Island Family Theme Park	United Kingdom	Huss	Frisbee	2017 to 2024; 2003 to 2016	Removed
Titan	La Ronde	Canada	Zamperla	Giant Discovery	2017	Operating
Twister	Park at OWA	United States	Zamperla	Discovery Revolution	2017	Operating
Wonder Woman Lasso of Truth	Six Flags Discovery Kingdom	United States	Zamperla	Giant Discovery	2017	Operating
Klake	Gyeongju World	South Korea	Zamperla	Discovery Revolution	2017	Operating
Trompo Loco	Barrio Frenezi Cuernavaca	(Mexico) México	SBF Visa Group	Midi Dance Party 360	2017	Operating
CraZanity	Six Flags Magic Mountain	United States	Zamperla	Giga Discovery	2018	Operating
Harley Quinn Spinsanity	Six Flags New England	United States	Zamperla	Giant Discovery	2018	Operating
Pendulum	Dreamland Margate	United Kingdom	Zamperla	Discovery Revolution	2018	Operating
Trompo Loco	Barrio Frenezi Puebla	(Mexico) México	Zamperla	Midi Discovery	2018	Operating
Patatús	Kataplum!	(Mexico) México	Zamperla	Discovery Revolution	2018	Operating
Big Pendulum	Gwangju Family Land	South Korea	Unknown	Unknown	2018	Operating
Tigeren	Djurs Sommerland	Denmark	Intamin	Gyro Swing	2019	Operating
Axis	Adventure Island	United Kingdom	SBF Visa Group	Maxi Dance Party 360	2019	Operating
Pandemonium	Six Flags Over Georgia	United States	Zamperla	Giant Discovery	2019	Operating
Chaos	Waldameer & Water World	United States	Zamperla	Discovery Revolution	2019	Operating
The Joker: Carnival of Chaos	Six Flags Fiesta Texas	United States	Zamperla	Giga Discovery	2019	Operating
Sea Swinger	SeaWorld San Antonio	United States	Zamperla	Discovery Revolution	2019	Operating
Wonder Woman Lasso of Truth	Six Flags Great Adventure	United States	Zamperla	Giga Discovery	2019	Operating
CraZanity	Six Flags Mexico	Mexico	Zamperla	Giga Discovery	2020	Operating
Harley Quinn Spinsanity	Six Flags America	United States	Zamperla	Giant Discovery	2021	SBNO
Cyclonator	Paultons Park	United Kingdom	Zamperla	Discovery Revolution	2021	Operating
AtmosFear	Oaks Amusement Park	United States	Zamperla	Discovery Revolution	2021	Closed until further notice
Sledgehammer	Luna Park Sydney	Australia	Zamperla	Discovery Revolution	2021	Operating
Giant Swing	Lotte World Busan	South Korea	Zamperla	Giant Discovery	2022	Operating
Swingi	Linnanmäki	Finland	Intamin	Gyro Swing	2024	Operating
Sky Striker	Six Flags Great America	United States	Zamperla	Giga Discovery	2024	Operating
The Joker: Carnival of Chaos	Six Flags St. Louis	United States	Zamperla	Giga Discovery	2024	Operating
Midway Mayhem; Formerly Revolution; Formerly Pendulum	Niagara Amusement Park & Splash World; Six Flags Great America; Six Flags Great Adventure	United States	Huss	Frisbee	2024; 2004 to 2023; 1999 to 2003	Under construction
Aviktas	Pleasure Beach Resort	United Kingdom	Intamin	Gyro Swing	2026	Operating

== Incidents ==
In May 2017, greasing material on a KMG Freak Out ride at Barry's Amusements at Portrush in Northern Ireland was dislodged, causing a loud bang and oil to spray over people and the nearby children's roller coaster. Nobody was injured, but the ride remained closed for the rest of the day whilst park staff investigated.

In July 2017, an 18-year old was killed while riding a KMG Fireball (aka Afterburner) ride that malfunctioned at the Ohio State Fair, sending him flying more than 50 feet in the air. Seven others were injured as well. Numerous fairs and exhibitions have either shut down or pulled the Fireball from their attractions in response to the incident. KMG stated that the malfunction was due to a corroded support beam.

In June 2019, a Zamperla Discovery Revolution ride named Chaos, located at Waldameer & Water World in Erie, Pennsylvania malfunctioned, resulting in riders being stuck upside down for several minutes. There were no injuries, and the ride reopened several days later with no subsequent incidents.

In June 2024, the AtmosFear ride at Oaks Amusement Park got suspended upside down, trapping 28 riders for about 30 minutes.
