= Octonauts Rollercoaster Adventure =

Steel junior roller coaster

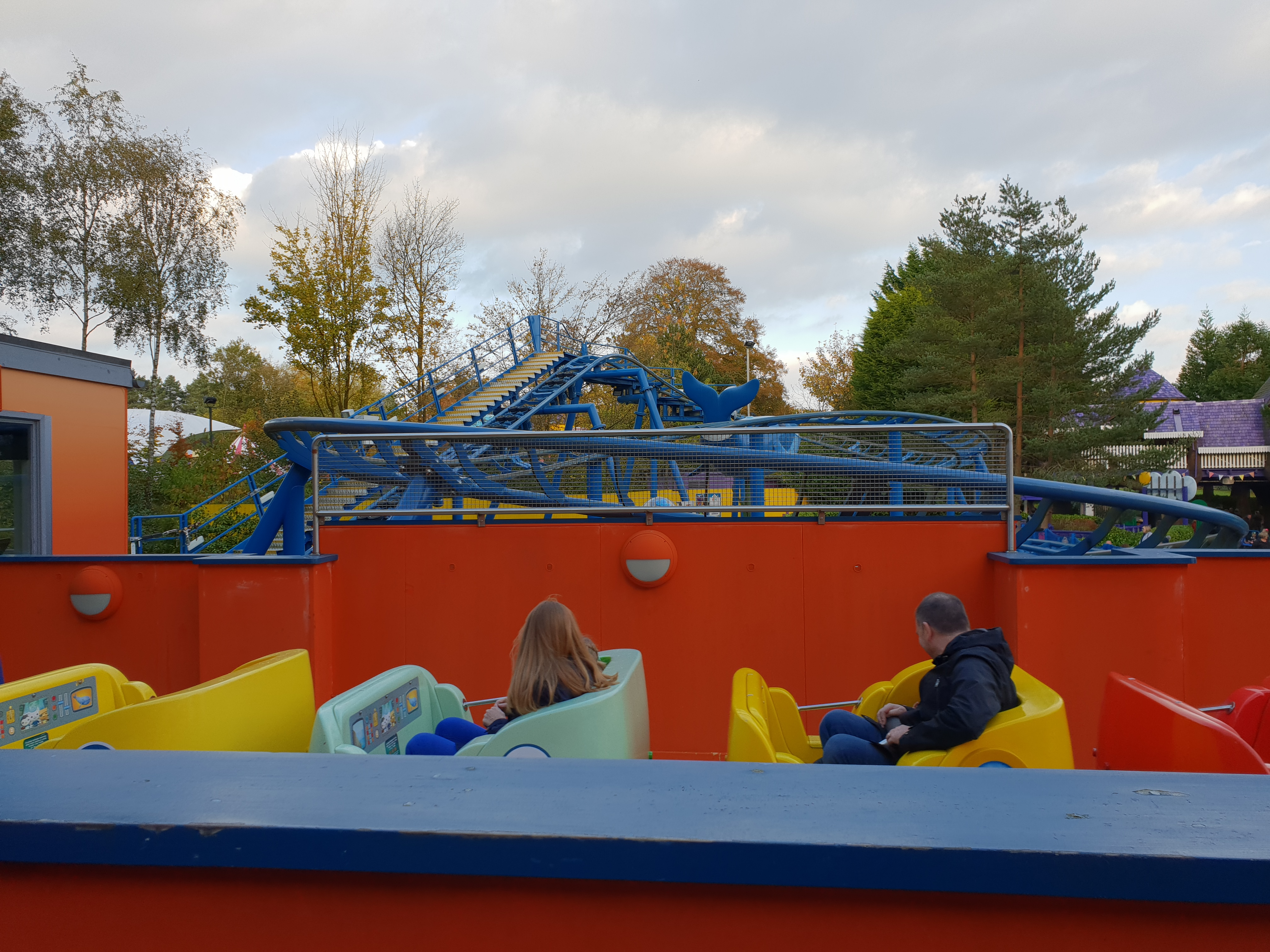

Alton Towers
- Location: Alton Towers
- Park section: CBeebies Land
- Coordinates: 52.9892713°N 1.8944871°W
- Status: Operating
- Opening date: 21 March 2015
- Replaced: Beastie

General statistics
- Type: Steel
- Manufacturer: Zamperla
- Model: Junior Coaster
- Lift/launch system: Booster Wheel Lift hill
- Height: 21.3 ft (6.5 m)
- Drop: 9.8 ft (3.0 m)
- Length: 469.2 ft (143.0 m)
- Inversions: 0
- Height restriction: 90 cm (2 ft 11 in)
- Trains: Single train with 7 cars; riders arranged 2 across in a single row for a total of 14 riders per train
- Octonauts Rollercoaster Adventure at RCDB

Octonauts Rollercoaster Adventure is a family roller coaster located in CBeebies Land at Alton Towers, Staffordshire. It opened on 21 March 2015. It is located next to Spinball Whizzer, in an area which was previously part of Adventure Land. The ride is manufactured by Italian amusement ride company Zamperla and is themed around the children's television programme, Octonauts, which is aired on CBeebies. It is a small family coaster, with a height of 6.5 metres and a 3-metre drop. It contains no inversions. The coaster replaces Beastie, which was removed in 2012.

== History ==
In January 2015, the site of the former Beastie roller coaster was being cleared, with concrete foundations and construction fences being placed on the site. On 17 January 2015, track and supports arrived on site at the park.

The ride was officially confirmed on Alton Towers' website on 14 February 2015 and opened on the first day of the season, 21 March 2015.

== Ride Experience ==
The ride begins with a right-hand turn out of the station, where the train then climbs the 6.5-metre-tall (21 ft) lift hill. The train then drops approximately 3 metres to the right, with a downwards left helix following. After exiting the helix, the train makes right-hand turn, before the track levels out on the brake run. The train then makes another right hand turn, which goes back into the station. The train makes 2 circuits per ride cycle. The coaster's track and supports are painted blue and there is a large amount of marine styled theming, which reflects the aquatic theme of Octonauts. The ride's minimum height restriction is 90 cm and unaccompanied by an adult, it is 110 cm.
