= La Revolucion (Knott's Berry Farm) =

Swinging Pendulum ride

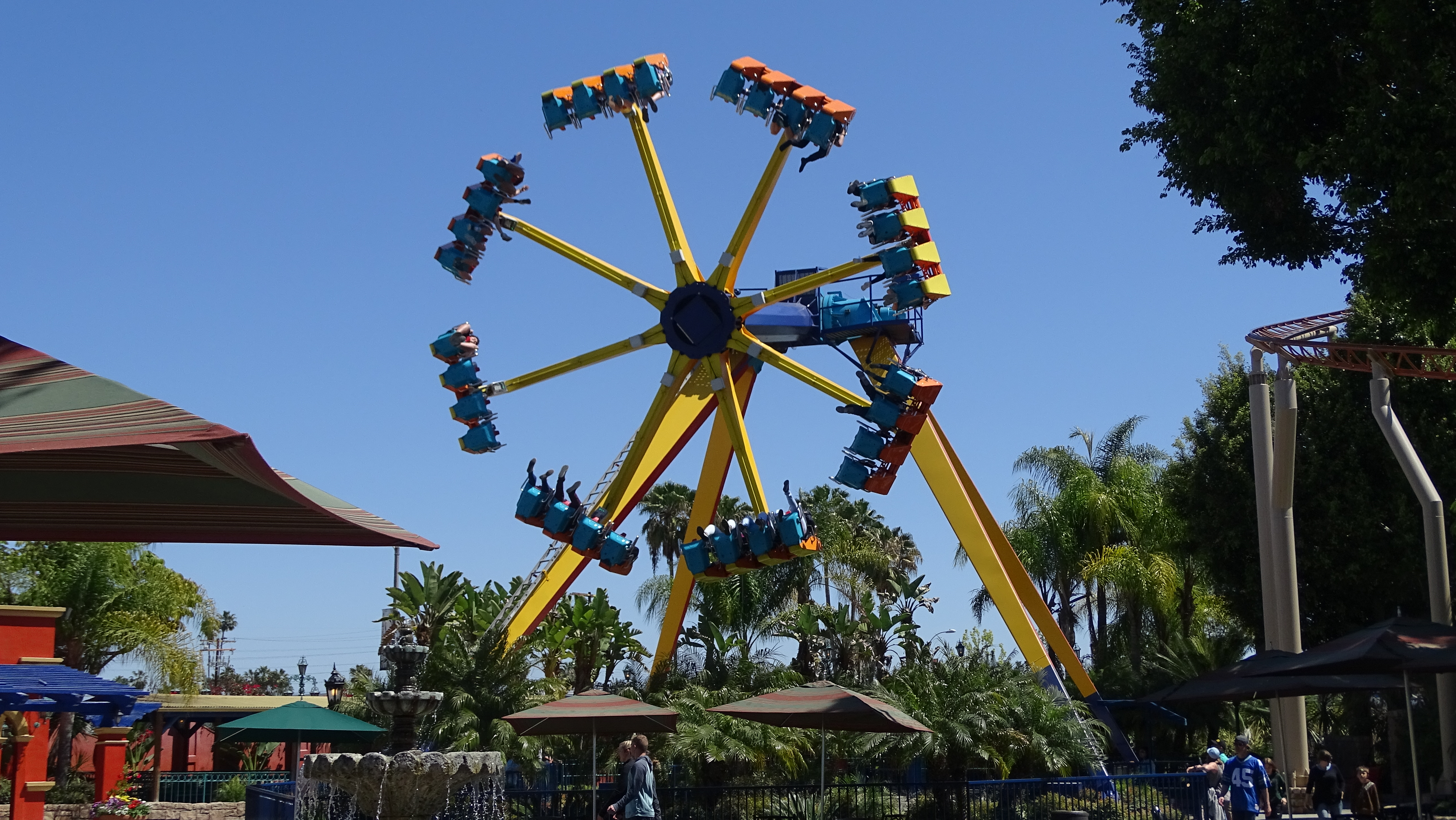
- La Revolucion

Knotts Berry Farm
- Area: Fiesta Village
- Status: Operating
- Opening date: May 29, 2003

Ride statistics
- Manufacturer: Chance Morgan
- Model: Pendulum ride
- Height: 64 ft (20 m)
- Capacity: 32 guests per cycle riders per hour
- Vehicles: 1
- Riders per vehicle: 4 riders per pendulum's arm
- Duration: 1:50
- Height restriction: 48 in (122 cm)
- Wheelchair accessible
- Must transfer from wheelchair

La Revolucion is a swinging Pendulum ride at Knott's Berry Farm built by Chance Morgan rides. Riders rotate 360 degrees while simultaneously swinging back and forth in a pendulum motion. The ride opened to the general public on May 29, 2003, in the Fiesta Village section of the park. As the pendulum ride swings left and ride it gains speed and height with each passing cycle. In the process, riders begin to rotate 360 degrees with each passing swinging cycle. At its peak, La Revolucion swings guests 64 feet in the air. The ride is positively rated for the sensation of weightiness throughout the duration of the ride.

== Height Requirement ==
La Revolucion has a minimum guest requirement of 48 inches. It is one of the park's several thrill rides. The ride is rated as aggressive thrill due to a high thrilling experience.

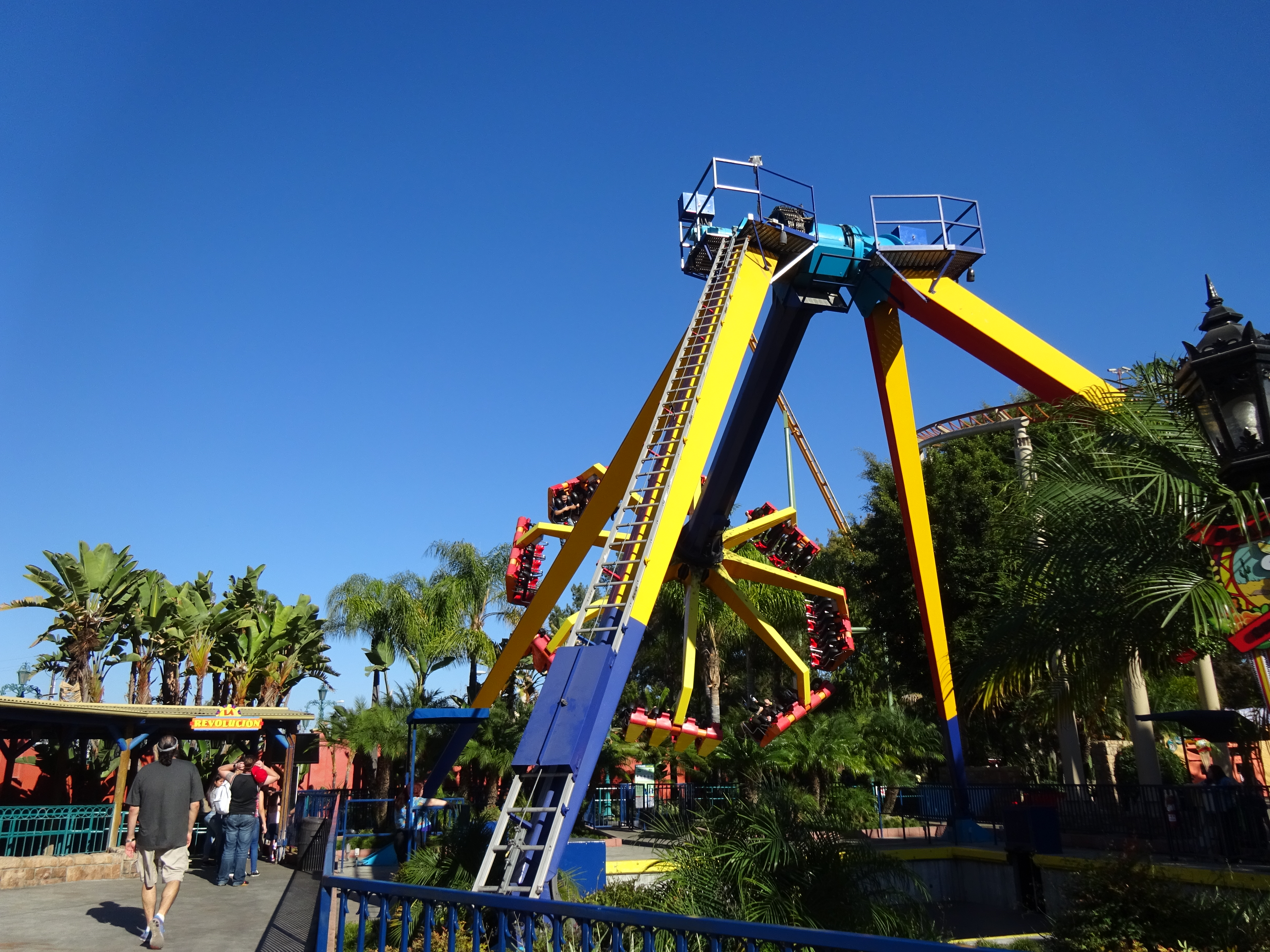
La Revolucion in motion.

== Experience ==
Located right in the Fiesta Village of the park, guests enter a large swinging pendulum ride. Due to Knott's often high crowds, the park built a customized design by Chance Morgan Rides. Riders select any set from the 8 rotating arms. Each rotating arm holds 4 guests, with a total number of 32 guests in the rotating arms. Riders are then instructed to place the over the shoulder restraints. As the ride becomes functional, the floor of the ride temporarily lowers in order to allow room for the ride's rapid swinging rotation at a slow speed as a starting point and its direction from right to left. Moreover, the arms begin to swing in a 360 degree movement while gaining height and speed at the same direction. As the ride gains more speed and height, the sensation of weightlessness is then felt by guests.

== Ride Closures ==
On July 27, 2017, Knott's Berry Farm had temporarily shut down La Revolucion in response to a deadly accident on a ride very similar in design in an Ohio Fair the previous day. On July 26, 2017, a carnival ride called "The Fire Ball" malfunctioned during the night causing one of the swinging arms to be separated from the ride causing one fatality and several injuries. During the ride closure, Knott's Berry Farm was required to have the state conduct a full inspection and test of the ride. The California Division of Occupational Safety and Health team later cleared the ride to begin operation following an intensive review of maintenance records.

== Photo gallery ==
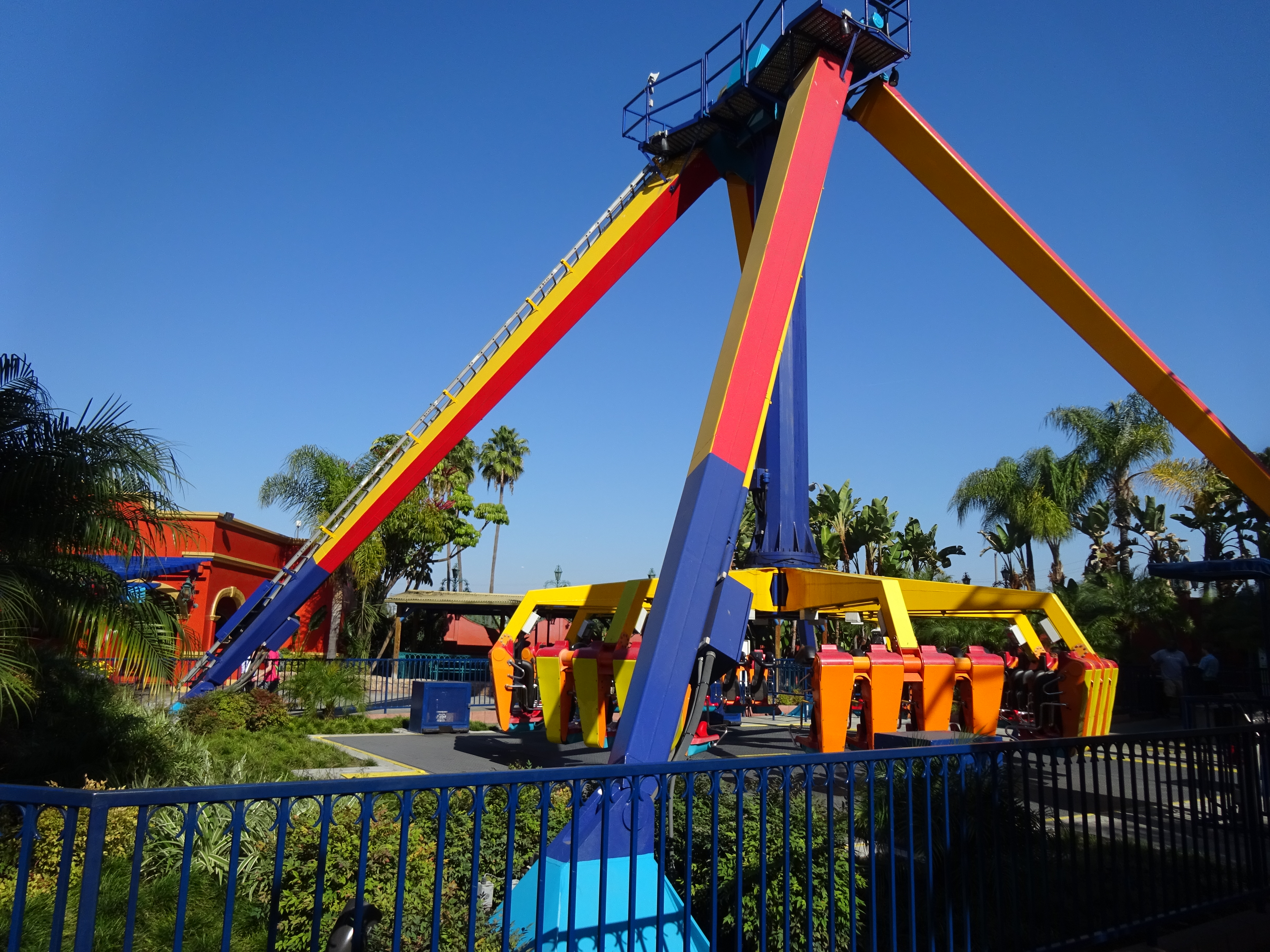
La Revolucion.
