= Pinfari =

Defunct Italian roller coaster manufacturer

- Industry: Manufacturing
- Founded: 1926
- Defunct: 15 July 2004
- Fate: Liquidated
- Successor: Interpark
- Headquarters: Suzzara (Lombardy), Italy
- Area served: Worldwide
- Key people: Daniel Pinfari
- Products: Roller coasters
- Website: www.pinfari.com

F.lli Pinfari S.r.l was an Italian amusement ride manufacturing company based in Suzzara, Italy. Pinfari was liquidated on 15 July 2004, due to the early 2000s recession and the weakness of the United States dollar. In 2007, its brand and intellectual property were acquired by Interpark Amusements Srl, based in Modena.

== History ==
The company, commonly known as Pinfari, was established in 1926 building Dodgem cars and buildings. Its first roller coaster was a wild mouse-style ride in 1954 called "bob-slide". In 1965 the company introduced a small portable coaster called Zyklon. These coasters proved very popular with traveling fairs and carnivals as wells as permanent amusement parks. Pinfari manufactured Zyklons in several variations and sizes, building over 200 since the ride's introduction. The models were designated Z40, Z47, Z64 and Z78 — "Z" representing Zyklon and the number representing the length of the coaster base in meters (i.e. the footprint of a Z47 is 47 metres (154 ft) by 18.5 metres (61 ft)). In the 1980s Pinfari added loops to the Zyklon model and marketed them as a Looping Zyklon or Looping Star. The model designation added the letter "L" sometimes next to the Z and sometimes after (i.e. ZL42, ZL50 or Z47L). The company also manufactured a popular children's coaster called Big Apple, nearly identical in design to Wacky Worms and Brucomela coasters by Preston and Fabbri.

In the late 1990s, Pinfari introduced a new model to eventually replace the Zyklon, although the Zyklon was still offered in the ride catalog. Known simply as Roller Coaster or Thriller Roller Coaster, these models were designated RC48, RC50 or RC70, with the larger RC70 having two loops and a corkscrew. The company also introduced a large non-looping family coaster designated FC80. The first RC70 was installed at M&D's Theme Park in Scotland, and the first and only FC80 was built at Wiener Prater in Austria.

Pinfari continued to expand its product line offering a junior inverted coaster in 1999 and a suspended looping coaster, with the first two suspended looping models going to Nigloland in France and Moreno's Park, a traveling show in Brazil.

== List of roller coasters ==
As of 2019, Pinfari has built 186 roller coasters around the world.

Name	Model	Park	Country	Opened	Status	Ref
Thriller	RC50	Luneur Park	Italy	Unknown	Removed	
Unknown	Zyklon Z47	Seaburn Fun Park	United Kingdom	Unknown	Removed	
Turbo	Zyklon ZL42	Brighton Pier	United Kingdom	Unknown	Operating	
Montanha Russa	Zyklon ZL42	Parque Trombini	Brazil	Unknown	Removed	
Ze Ulta Fulta Express	Zyklon ZL42	Fantasy Land	India	Unknown	Removed	
Pepsi-Cola Loop	Zyklon ZL42	Ffrith Beach Fun Parc; Ocean Beach Amusement Park	United Kingdom	Unknown; 1990 to 2007	Removed	
Looping Star	Zyklon ZL42	M&Ds Scotland's Theme Park	United Kingdom	Unknown	Removed	
Zyklon	RC40	Funtown Pier	United States	Unknown	Removed	
Storm	RC40	Peter Pan's Playground	United Kingdom	Unknown	Removed	
Big Apple	Big Apple MB28	Peter Pan's Playground	United Kingdom	Unknown	Removed	
Kålmoren	Big Apple (Turn Table)	Tivoli Karolinelund	Denmark	Unknown	Removed	
Brucomela	Unknown	Luneur Park	Italy	Unknown	Removed	
Clown Coaster	Circus Clown	Chessington World of Adventures	United Kingdom	Unknown	Removed	
Italian Bobs	Zyklon Z??	Adventureland Park	United States	Unknown	Removed	
Treno Delle Miniere	Unknown	Luneur Park	Italy	Unknown	Removed	
Crazy Loop	Unknown	Tama Tech Motopia	Japan	Unknown	Removed	
Unknown; Formerly Flying Dutchman	Zyklon Z78	Coney Park; Dorney Park	Jamaica	Unknown; 1977 to1988	Removed	
Hochbahn	Zyklon Z47	Wiener Prater	Austria	1966	Removed	
Zyklon	Zyklon Z47	Morey's Piers	United States	1967	Removed	
Hells Angels	Zyklon Z??	Casino Pier	United States	1967	Removed	
Himalaya	Zyklon Z78	Luneur Park	Italy	1968	Removed	
Unknown	Zyklon Z47	Bagatelle	France	1969	Removed	
Rakevet Harim	Zyklon Z47	Luna Park Tel Aviv	Israel	1970	Removed	
Cyclone	Zyklon Z40	Dreamland	United Kingdom	1970	Removed	
Meteor Roller Coaster; Formerly Supersonic Roller Coaster	Zyklon Supersonic	Sportland Pier	United States	1971	Removed	
Cyclone	Zyklon Z40	Battersea Fun Fair	United Kingdom	1973	Removed	
Mouse Trap; Formerly Big Coaster	Zyklon Z64	Wonderland Amusement Park	United States	1975	Operating	
Ciklon	Zyklon Z64	Holnemvolt Park	Hungary	1975	Removed	
Chicago Cat	Zyklon Z47	Old Chicago	United States	1975	Removed	
Zyklon	Zyklon Z47	Western Fair	Canada	1976	Removed	
Valle degli Gnomi	Unknown	Fiabilandia	Italy	1976	Operating	
Masken	Big Apple MB28	Parken Zoo	Sweden	1977	Operating	
Wildcat	Zyklon Z40	Southport Pleasureland	United Kingdom	1978	Removed	
Hochbahn	Zyklon Z64	Wiener Prater	Austria	1979	Removed	
Zyklon	Zyklon Z??	Funtrackers	United States	1979	Removed	
Jet Stream	Zyklon Z64	Ocean Beach Amusement Park; Belle Vue Park; Battersea Fun Fair	United Kingdom	1980; 1975 to 1977; 1974	Removed	
Zyklon	Zyklon Z40	Jolly Roger at the Pier	United States	1981	Removed	
Big Apple	Big Apple (Turn Table)	Luna Park	United States	1981	Removed	
Big Apple	Big Apple MB28	Southport Pleasureland	United Kingdom	1982	Removed	
Zyklon	Zyklon Z??	Lakeview Park	United States	1983	Removed	
Le Grand Huit; Formerly Grand 8	Zyklon Z47	Walibi Rhône-Alpes; Walibi Belgium	France	1984; 1975 to 1983	Removed	
Python Looping Coaster	Zyklon ZL42	Drayton Manor	United Kingdom	1984	Removed	
Circus Clown	Circus Clown	Southport Pleasureland	United Kingdom	1984	Removed	
HurryCane Roller Coaster	Unknown	Riverview Park & Waterworld	United States	1984	Removed	
Looping	preZyklon TL59	Hili Fun City	United Arab Emirates	1985	Removed	
Looping Bahn	Zyklon ZL42	Wiener Prater	Austria	1985	Removed	
Montanha Russa	Zyklon Z40	Bracalãndia; Feira Popular de Lisboa	Portugal	1986; Unknown	Removed	
Big Apple	Big Apple MB28	Dreamland	United Kingdom	1986	Removed	
Ciclon	Zyklon Z47	Parque Diversiones	Costa Rica	1987	Removed	
Big Apple	Big Apple MB28	Botton's Pleasure Beach	United Kingdom	1987	Operating	
Looping	Zyklon ZL42	Feira Popular de Lisboa	Portugal	1988	Removed	
Stampede; Formerly Cyclone	Zyklon Z40	Frontierland Family Theme Park; Blackpool Pleasure Beach	United Kingdom	1988; 1974 to 1987	Removed	
Cyclone	Zyklon Z40	Genting Theme Park	Malaysia	1988	Removed	
Unknown	Unknown	Wicksteed Park	United Kingdom	1988	Removed	
Zyclone	Zyklon Z40	EsselWorld	India	1989	Closed	
Storm	RC40	Botton's Pleasure Beach	United Kingdom	1989	Removed	
Zyklon	Zyklon Z??	Billing Aquadrome	United Kingdom	1989	Removed	
Looping Star	Zyklon ZL42	Great Yarmouth Pleasure Beach	United Kingdom	1990	Removed	
Super Dragon	Super Dragon MD31	Treasure Island Amusement Park	United Kingdom	1990	Operating	
Big Apple	Big Apple MB28	EsselWorld	India	1990	Closed	
Superloopen	Zyklon ZL50	Furuvik	Sweden	1991	Removed	
Loop 2000	Zyklon ZL42	Superland	Israel	1991	Removed	
Thunder Mountain	Zyklon Z40	Flamingo Land	United Kingdom	1991	Removed	
Zyklon	Zyklon Z47	Magic Springs & Crystal Falls	United States	1992	Removed	
Dinosaur Valley	RC40	Wicksteed Park	United Kingdom	1992	Operating	
Montaña Rusa	RC50	Mundo Divertido	Mexico	1993	Removed	
Montaña Rusa	Zyklon ZL42	Mundo Divertido	Mexico	1993	Removed	
Montanha Russa; Formerly Big Mountain	Zyklon Z40	Play Kid	Brazil	1993	Operating	
Ortobruco Tour	Unknown	Gardaland	Italy	1993	Operating	
Diamon Python	Zyklon Z40	Meribula's Magic Mountain	Australia	1994	Operating	
Looping Star	Zyklon ZL42	Neverland Ranch	United States	1995	Removed	
Sorcerer	RC40	Camelot Theme Park	United Kingdom	1995	Removed	
Mega Blitz	RC50	Coney Beach Pleasure Park	United Kingdom	1996	Removed	
Zyklon	Zyklon Z47	Dinosaur Beach	United States	1996	Removed	
Looping Thunder	Zyklon ZL42	Oaks Amusement Park	United States	1996	Removed	
Looping Star	Zyklon ZL42	Jolly Roger at the Pier	United States	1996	Operating	
Super 8er Bahn	FC80	Wiener Prater	Austria	1997	Removed	
Super Loop	Zyklon ZL50	Izmir Fuari	Turkey	1997	Operating	
Looping Star	Zyklon ZL42	American Park	Brazil	2012	Operating	
Chenille	Big Apple MB28	Nigloland	France	1997	Operating	
Montanha Russa	Zyklon Z47	Walter World	Brazil	1998	Operating	
Firecracker; Formerly Cyclone	Zyklon Z47	Jolly Roger Amusement Park; Holiday World; Geauga Lake	United States	1998; 1981 to 1997; 1976 to 1980	Removed	
Mini Dragon	Super Dragon MD31	Funland Park	United Kingdom	1998	Removed	
Big Apple; Formerly Mini Apple	Big Apple MB28	Great Yarmouth Pleasure Beach; Alton Towers	United Kingdom	1998; 1982 to 1997	Operating	
Imorinth	Unknown	Himeji Central Park	Japan	1998	Operating	
Figure of Eight; Tokaydo Express	Super Train ST40	Brean Theme Park; Blackpool Pleasure Beach	United Kingdom	1998; 1980 to 1997	Removed	
Rollies Coaster	Zyklon Z40	Morey's Piers	United States	1999	Operating	
African Big Apple	Big Apple MB28	West Midland Safari Park	United Kingdom	1999	Operating	
Big Apple	Big Apple MB28	M&Ds Scotland's Theme Park	United Kingdom	1999	Removed	& &
Queen Bee	Queen Bee AR28	Center Norte	Argentina	1999	Removed	
Hurricane	RC70	Center Norte	Argentina	2000	Removed	
RC-48	RC48	Morey's Piers	United States	2000	Removed	
Vildkatten	Zyklon ZL42	Sommerland Sjælland	Denmark	2000	Operating	
Viper; Formerly Big Dipper	Zyklon Z40	Knowsley Safari Park; Marvel's Amusement Park	United Kingdom	2000; 1973 to 1999	Removed	
Jubilé	Zyklon Z40	Selva Mágica; Plopsaland	Mexico	2000; 1995 to 2000	Operating	
Äppelmasken	Big Apple MB28	Ölands Djur & Nölespark	Sweden	2000	Operating	
Unknown	Big Apple MB28	Wonder World Amusement Park	Uganda	2000	Operating	
Família Expressz	Super Train ST40	Holnemvolt Park	Hungary	2000	Removed	
Dragen; Formerly Caterpillar	Super Dragon MD31	Tivoli Friheden	Denmark	2001	Operating	
Speedy Mouse; Formerly Big Apple	Big Apple MB28	Barry's Amusements	United Kingdom	2001	Removed	
Zolo Coaster; Formerly Big Dipper	RC50	Jungle Land; Barry's Amusements	Saudi Arabia	2002; 1997 to 2001	Closed	
Big Dipper; Barry's Big Dipper	Zyklon ZL42	Curry's Fun Park Portrush formerly Barry's Amusements	United Kingdom	2022; 2002 to 2019	Removed	
Montaña Rusa	Zyklon ZL42	Mundo Divertido	Mexico	2002	Removed	
Roller Coaster	RC40	Nova Nicolândi	Brazil	2002	Operating	
Minicoaster Apple	Big Apple MB28	Nettuno Park	Italy	2002	Operating	
Queen Bee	Queen Bee AR28	Botton's Pleasure Beach	United Kingdom	2002	Operating	
Tokaido	Super Train ST40	Luneur Park	Italy	2002	Removed	
Alexandros	Big Apple MB28	Ta Aidonakia Luna Park	Greece	2002	Removed	
Zyklon Loop	Zyklon ZL42	Star City	Philippines	2003	Removed	
Looping Star	Zyklon ZL42	Xinghai Square	China	2003	Removed	
Looping Star	Zyklon ZL42	Wonder Land	Egypt	2003	Operating	
Magic Loop	Zyklon ZL42	Aventura Luna Park	Venezuela	2003	Operating	
World Express	Zyklon ZL42	Parque de Atracciones de Plaza Mayor	Venezuela	2003	Operating	
King	Zyklon Z40	Nashville Valley Amusement Park	United States	2003	Removed	
Montanha Russa	Zyklon Z40	Park Trombini	Brazil	2003	Operating	
Super Train	RC40	AltınPark Bursa	Turkey	2003	Operating	
Mighty Mini Mega	Mini Mega Coaster MM29	Adventure Island	United Kingdom	2003	Operating	
Familienachterbahn	Super Dragon MD31	Funny Park	Austria	2003	Removed	
Miniera d'Oro Del West	Unknown	Fiabilandia	Italy	2003	Operating	
Brucomela	Big Apple MB28	Demetevler Luna Park	Turkey	2003	Removed	
Tsunami	Xpress XP48	M&Ds Scotland's Theme Park	United Kingdom	2004	Removed	
Crazy Loop; Formerly Shock Wave	preZyklon TL59	Brean Theme Park; Pleasure Island Family Theme Park; Flamingo Land	United Kingdom	2004; 1996 to 2002; 1986 to 1995	Operating	
Pomme; Formerly Chenille	Big Apple MB28	Cita-Parc	France	2004	Removed	
Log Roll'r Coaster	Circus Clown	Yellowstone Bear World	United States	2004	Removed	
Roller Coaster	Zyklon ZL50	Adlerkurort Metro Park	Russia	2005	Operating	
Klondike Gold Mine	Zyklon ZL42	Funland Amusement Park; Drayton Manor	United Kingdom	2005; 1995 to 2004	Removed	
Montaña Rusa; Formerly Cyclon	Zyklon ZL42	VulQano Park; Fantasilandia	Ecuador	2005; 1994 to 2004	Removed	
Z40 Roller Coaster	Zyklon Z40	Tir Prince Family Funfair	United Kingdom	2005	Removed	
El Bandido	Zyklon Z64	Western Playland (Sunland Park, New Mexico); Western Playland (El Paso, Texas)	United States	2006; 1974 to 2005	Operating	
Looping Star; Formerly Looping	Zyklon ZL42	Big Center Park; Magic Park	Brazil	2006; 1999 to 2005	Removed	
Looping Star	Zyklon ZL42	Kunming International Convention & Exhibition Center	China	2006	Removed	
Elma Kurdu	Big Apple MB28	Izmir Fuari	Turkey	2006	Operating	
Bat Coaster	Xpress XP56	Antibes Land; Nigloland	France	2007; 2004 to 2006	Removed	
Star Flyer	Xpress XP56	Star City	Philippines	2007	Operating	
Looping Star	Zyklon ZL42	Yuxi Park	China	2007	Removed	
Hoola Loop	Zyklon ZL42	EsselWorld	India	2007	Closed	
Tokaido; Formerly X Speed	Super Train ST40	EuroPark Milano Idroscalo; Movieland Park	Italy	2007; 2003 to 2006	Removed	
Unknown	Unknown	Gorky Park	Russia	2007	Removed	
Colossu's Loop; Formerly Looping Star	Zyklon Z47L	Nova Nicolândia; Coney Island Park Brasil	Brazil	2008; Unknown	Operating	
Fami'Stéric; Formerly Sky Ways Roller Coaster; Formerly Skytrax	Zyklon Z47	Fami P.A.R.C; Pirat' Park; Brean Theme Park	France	2008; 2006; Unknown	Removed	
City Coaster	Zyklon ZL42	Beijing Carnival	China	2008	Removed	
Crazy Caterpillar	Big Apple MB28	Tir Prince Family Funfair	United Kingdom	2008	Operating	
Xpress	Xpress XP48	Tsitsinatela	(Georgia (country)) Georgia	2009	Closed	
Ali Baba Coaster	Zyklon Z47	Gloria's Fantasyland	Philippines	2009	Operating	
Looping Star	Zyklon ZL42	Aden Park	Yemen	2009	Operating	
Cyclon	Zyklon ZL42	Fantasilandia	Chile	1994 to 2004	Removed	
Montaña Rusa	Super Dragon MD31	Aventura Center (Las Condes)	Chile	2009 to 2012	Removed	
El Ciclón Loop	Zyklon ZL42	Serena Aventura	Chile	2022	Operating	
Montaña Rusa	Zyklon Z40	Serena Aventura	Chile	2018	Operating	
Cyclon	Zyklon Supersonic	Odessa Amusement Park	Ukraine	2010	Operating	
Oray Orayan	Zyklon ZL42	Sabda Alam Water Park	Indonesia	2010	Removed	
Tornado	Zyklon Z78	Parque Grano De Oro; Interpark	Venezuela	2010; 2004 to 2009	Removed	
Caterpillar; Formerly Big Apple; Formerly Rattler	Big Apple MB28	Billing Aquadrome; Blackpool Pleasure Beach; Frontierland Family Theme Park; National Garden Festival	United Kingdom	2011; 2003 to 2004; 1991 to 1999; 1990	Removed	
Clown Coaster; Formerly Circus Clown; Formerly Nicky's Circus	Circus Clown	Wicksteed Park; Blackpool Pleasure Beach; Harbour Park	United Kingdom	2011; 1989 to 2008; Unknown	Operating	
Super Jet	Zyklon Z64	Parque Multirama; Playcenter São Paulo	Brazil	2012; 1973 to 1996	Operating	
Loop Max Adrenaline; Formerly Roller Coaster; Formerly Gauntlet; Formerly Looping Star	Zyklon ZL42	Luna Park Sunny Beach; Playground Varna; Camelot Theme Park; Dreamland; Craig Tara Holiday Park	Bulgaria	2012; 2009 to 2012; 2001 to 2006; 1999 to 2001; 1987 to 1999	Operating	
Roller Coaster	Zyklon Z40	Edenlandia	Italy	2012	Removed	
Super Dragon; Formerly Montaña Rusa	Super Dragon MD31	Republica de los Niños; Aventura Center	Argentina	2012; 1988 to 2007	Removed	
Big Apple	Big Apple MB28	West Sands Fun Fair; Flamingo Park	United Kingdom	2012; 2006 to 2011	Operating	
Sand Blaster; Formerly Blue Diamond Streak; Formerly Zyklon; Formerly Sidewinder; Formerly Super Italian Bobs	Zyklon Z64	Boardwalk Amusements; Blue Diamond Park; DelGrosso's Amusement Park; Wild West World; Legend City; Adventureland Park	United States	2013; 2004 to 2007; 1987 to 2003; 1984 to 1986; 1978 to 1983; Unknown	Removed	
Wriggler; Formerly Caterpillar Capers	Big Apple MB28	Gulliver's Warrington; Camelot Theme Park	United Kingdom	2013; 1984 to 2012	Operating	
Apollo Coaster; Formerly Montagnes du Grand Canyon	Zyklon Z64	Kingoland; OK Corral	France	2014; 2000 to 2011	Operating	
WildCat; Formerly Zyklon; Formerly Zyclone	Zyklon Z47	Santa's Village AZoosment Park; Fun Spot Park; Morey's Piers	United States	2014; 1990 to 2008; 1988 to 1989	Removed	
Loop Coaster; Formerly Dream Liner	Zyklon ZL42	Sky Ranch Pampanga; Carron Dream Park	Philippines	2014; 2012 to 2014	Operating	
Unknown; Formerly Looping	preZyklon TL59	Family Fun; Tivoli Karolinelund	Iraq	2015; Unknown	Operating	
Looping Star	Zyklon ZL42	Keansburg Amusement Park; Sauble Beach Fun World; Beech Bend	United States	2015; 2011; 2001 to 2009	Operating	
Strom; Formerly Roller Coaster	RC40	Magic Park Land; EuroPark Milano Idroscalo	France	2015; 2006 to 2014	Operating	
Crazy Train	Mini Mega Coaster MM29	Gulliver's Warrington; Codona's Amusement Park	United Kingdom	2015; 2003 to 2014	Operating	
Loop Roller Coaster; Formerly Python	Zyklon ZL42	CJ Barrymore's Family Entertainment Center; Playland's Castaway Cove	United States	2016; 1996 to 2015	Operating	
Superman Coaster	Zyklon ZL42	Jawa Timur Park 1	Indonesia	2016	Operating	
Magic Loop	Zyklon ZL42	Parque De Diversiones	Bolivia	2016	Operating	
London City Coaster; Formerly Grizzly Bear; Formerly Cyclone	Zyklon Z47	Verkeers- en Attractiepark Duinen Zathe; Lightwater Valley; Spanish City Amusement Park	Netherlands	2017; 2004 to 2008; 1991 to 2000	Operating	
Looping; Formerly Roller Coaster F1; Formerly Grizzly; Formerly Looping Dipper	Zyklon ZL42	Southport Pleasureland; Wesole Miasteczko Family Park; Kongeparken; Barry's Amusements	United Kingdom	2017; 2009 to 2013; 2004; 1991 to 1996	Operating	
Creepy Crawler; Formerly Space Coaster; Formerly Express; Formerly Cobra	RC40	Oakwood Theme Park; M&Ds Scotland's Theme Park	United Kingdom	2017; 2006 to 2015; 2003 to 2004; Unknown	Removed	& &
Zyclon Coaster	Zyklon Z47	Kids Fun Park	Indonesia	2017	Operating	
Thriller	RC50	Happy Land; Leolandia; EuroPark Milano Idroscalo	Turkey	2017; 2006 to 2007; Unknown	Removed	
Emerald Coaster; Formerly Cat & Mouse; Formerly Zyklon	Zyklon Z40	Sam's Fun City; Ocean Beach Pleasure Park; Harbour Park	United States	2018; 2002 to 2016; 1986 to 2001	Operating	
Dragon Challenge; Formerly Beastie; Formerly Dragon; Formerly Mini Dragon	Super Dragon MD31	Barry Island Pleasure Park; Alton Towers	United Kingdom	2018; 1983 to 2010	Operating	
Circus Clown	Circus Clown	[[Camel Creek Adventure Park<]]br>Oakwood Theme Park	United Kingdom	2019; 1997 to 2018	Operating	
Unknown; Formerly Big Ohhhh! Formerly Zyklon; Formerly Thunderail	Zyklon Z64	Lakeside Amusement Park; Fun Plex; Saginaw County Fairgrounds; Celebration City; Hamel's Park	United States	2023; 2007 to 2017; 2003 to 2006; 2000 to 2001; 1978 to 1999	Operating	
Unknown	Zyklon Z40	Luna Park Sincan; Lunapark Mersin	Turkey	2019; 2004 to 2018	Under construction	
Unknown; Formerly Orkanens Øje	Zyklon ZL42	Baghdad Island; Tivoli Friheden	Iraq	2019; 1986 to 2018	Under construction	
Gold Rush; Formerly Python	Mini Mega Coaster MM29	Kingoland; Gulliver's Milton Keynes	France	2020; 2003 to 2018	Operating	
Gotham; Formerly Tornado	RC70	Parc d'Attractions Marseillan-Plage; M&Ds Scotland's Theme Park	France	2021; 1998 to 2020	Operating	
Looping Star	Zyklon ZL42	Clacton Pier; Codona's Amusement Park	United Kingdom	2021; 1999 to 2019	Operating	&
Magic Dragon; Formerly Funlandasaurus; Formerly Super Dragon	Super Dragon MD31	Clacton Pier; Codona's Amusement Park	United Kingdom	2021; 2008 to 2019; 1984 to 2007	Operating	
Super 8 Volante	Zyklon Z53	Argenpark ItalPark	Argentina	1992 1965 to 1990	Operating	
Tornado	Zyklon Z47	Piazza Vittorio Veneto - Carnevale di Torino	Italy	1963-1966	Removed	
Montaña Rusa	Zyklon Z47	Parque Rodó	Uruguay	1962 to 1980s	Removed	

- circa 1997 F.LLI Pinfari ride catalog
