= Clacton Pier =

Pier in Clacton-on-Sea, England

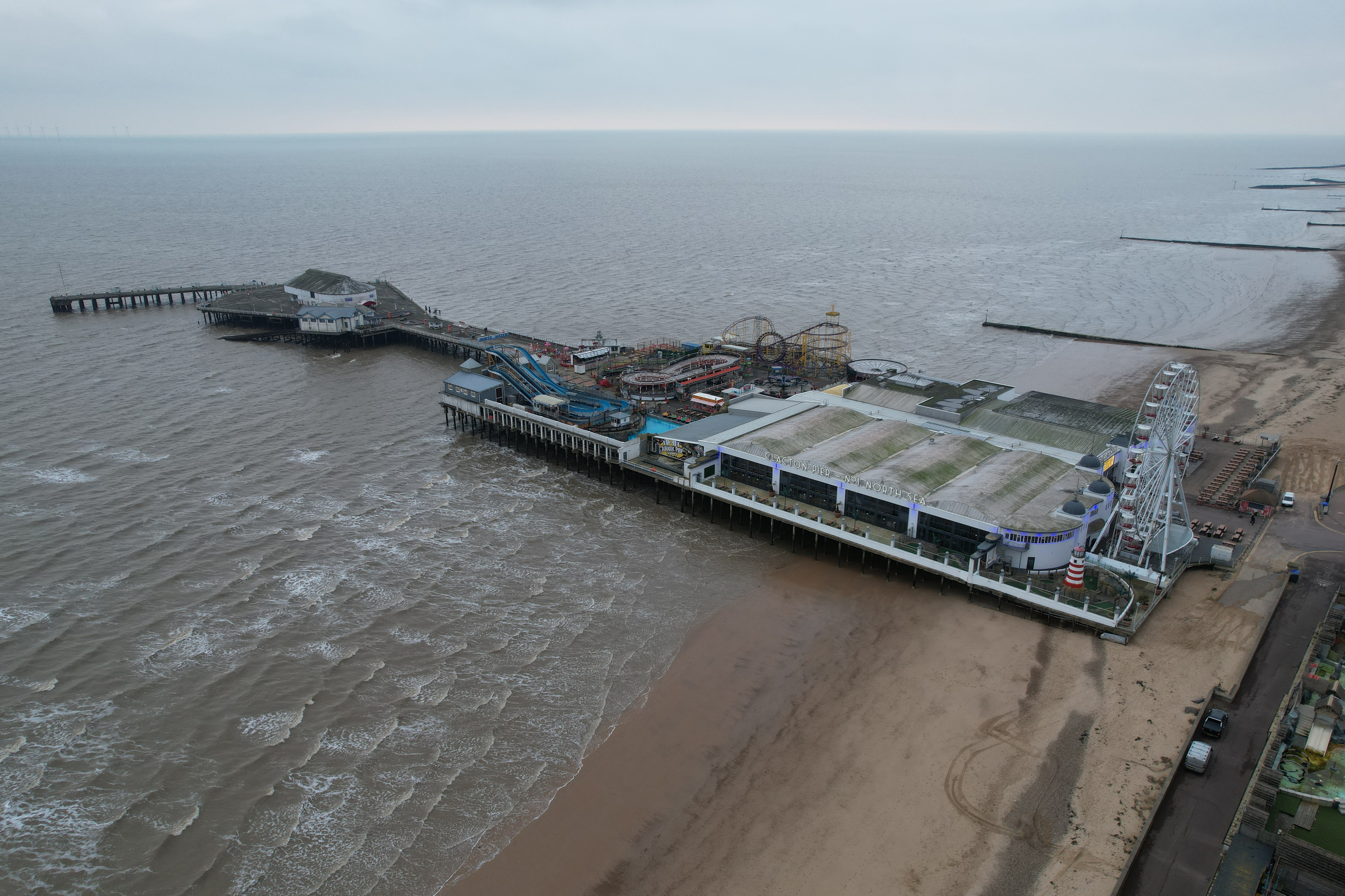
- Clacton Pier in 2026
- Type: Working pier with landing stages
- Carries: People
- Spans: North Sea
- Location: Clacton-on-Sea
- Coordinates: 51.7855°N 1.1559°E
- Official name: Clacton Pier
- Owner: The Clacton Pier Company Ltd
- Website: www.clactonpier.co.uk

Characteristics
- Total length: 1,180 feet (360 m)

History
- Opening date: 27 July 1871

Clacton Pier is a pier located in the seaside resort town of Clacton-on-Sea in England. It was named Pier of the Year in 2020 by the National Piers Society. The pier hosts rides, ten-pin bowling, arcades, 4D dinosaur exhibit, golf and a soft-play centre – as well as numerous food, drink and retail outlets.

== Development ==
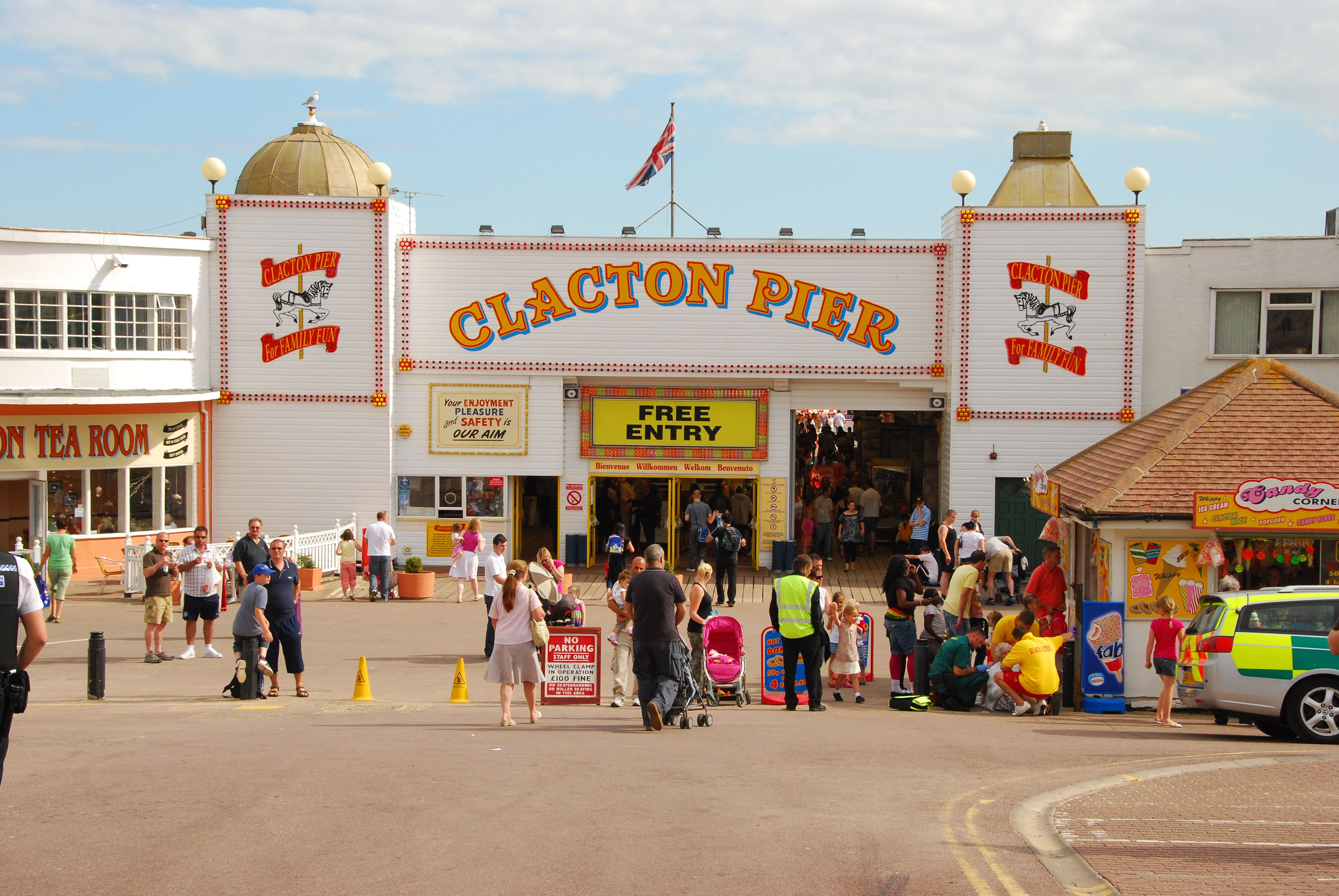
Clacton Pier from the seafront

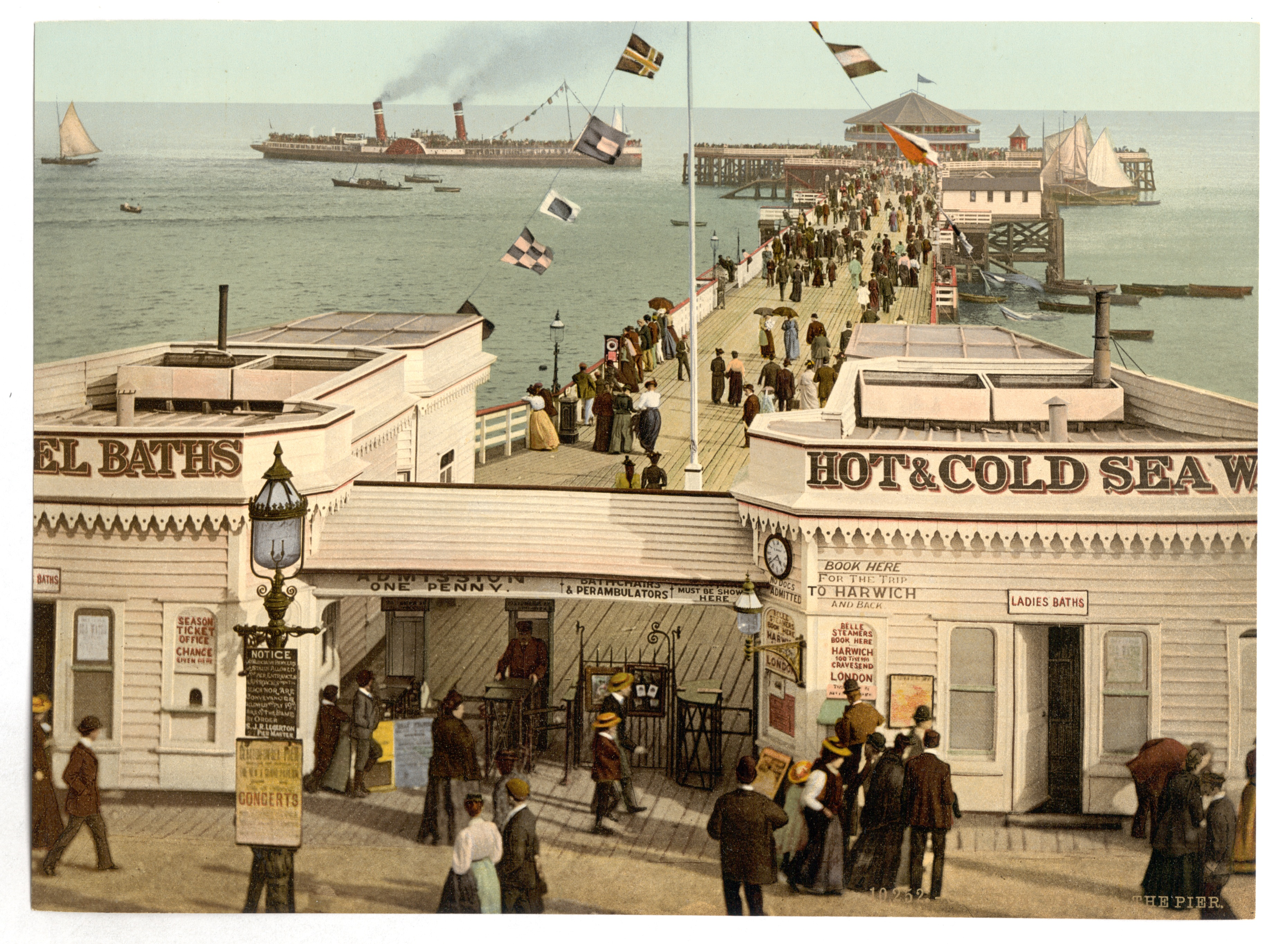
The pier circa 1895

The first Clacton Pier, which opened on 27 July 1871 was the first public building officially opened in the all-new resort of Clacton-on-Sea. It had been authorised by the Thorpe and Great Clacton Railway Act 1866 (29 & 30 Vict. c. cxciv). A wooden structure 160 yards (150 m) in length and 4 yards (3.7 m) wide, the pier served as a landing point for goods and passengers, a docking point for steamships operated by the Woolwich Steam Packet Company, and a focal and meeting-point for promenading.

Originally part of a railway scheme by the Thorpe and Great Clacton Railway and Pier Company, the railway plans were abandoned in 1872, and the company changed its name by the Clacton-on-Sea Pier Order 1875 to the Clacton-on-Sea Pier Company.

By 1893, Clacton had become such a popular destination for day trippers that the pier was lengthened to 1180 ft (360m) and entertainment facilities, including a pavilion and a waiting room, were added to accommodate them.

== Post-World War I to 1970s ==
At the end of the First World War, the pier was bought by Ernest Kingsman, and it remained in the ownership of his family until 1971.

Kingsman added some major improvements to the pier including an RNLI lifeboat house, theatre called the Ocean Theatre, Blue Lagoon Dance Hall, Crystal Casino, open-air stage, open-air swimming pool and roller coaster called Steel Stella.

During World War II, the Pier was breached to prevent it being used as a landing stage. A floating German mine also caused considerable damage.

Following the war, after significant refurbishment, the 1946 season began with Gene Durham headlining the traditional seaside show The Ocean Review, supported by Betty Martin and Gordon Norville. Gene Durham continued to headline until 1950, when Tony Hancock took over. In later years, season-long headline acts included Ted Rogers and Roy Hudd.

By 1971, the pier was under the control of Barney Kingsman (Earnest Kingsman's Son) and with visitor numbers declining a decision was made to sell the Pier. It was sold privately during the year to Michael Goss. The Goss family already had the majority share in neighbouring Walton Pier. Goss ran the pier as a successful amusement centre until he eventually grew frustrated with the lack of support from the local authority and decided it was time to sell up and retire.

From 1971 to 1985, dolphins and killer whales were kept and displayed on the pier at the site of the former open-air swimming pool.

In 1973, a fire caused significant structural damage to the pier, particularly the roller coaster. In 1978, a severe storm caused additional significant structural weakness.

== Restoration ==
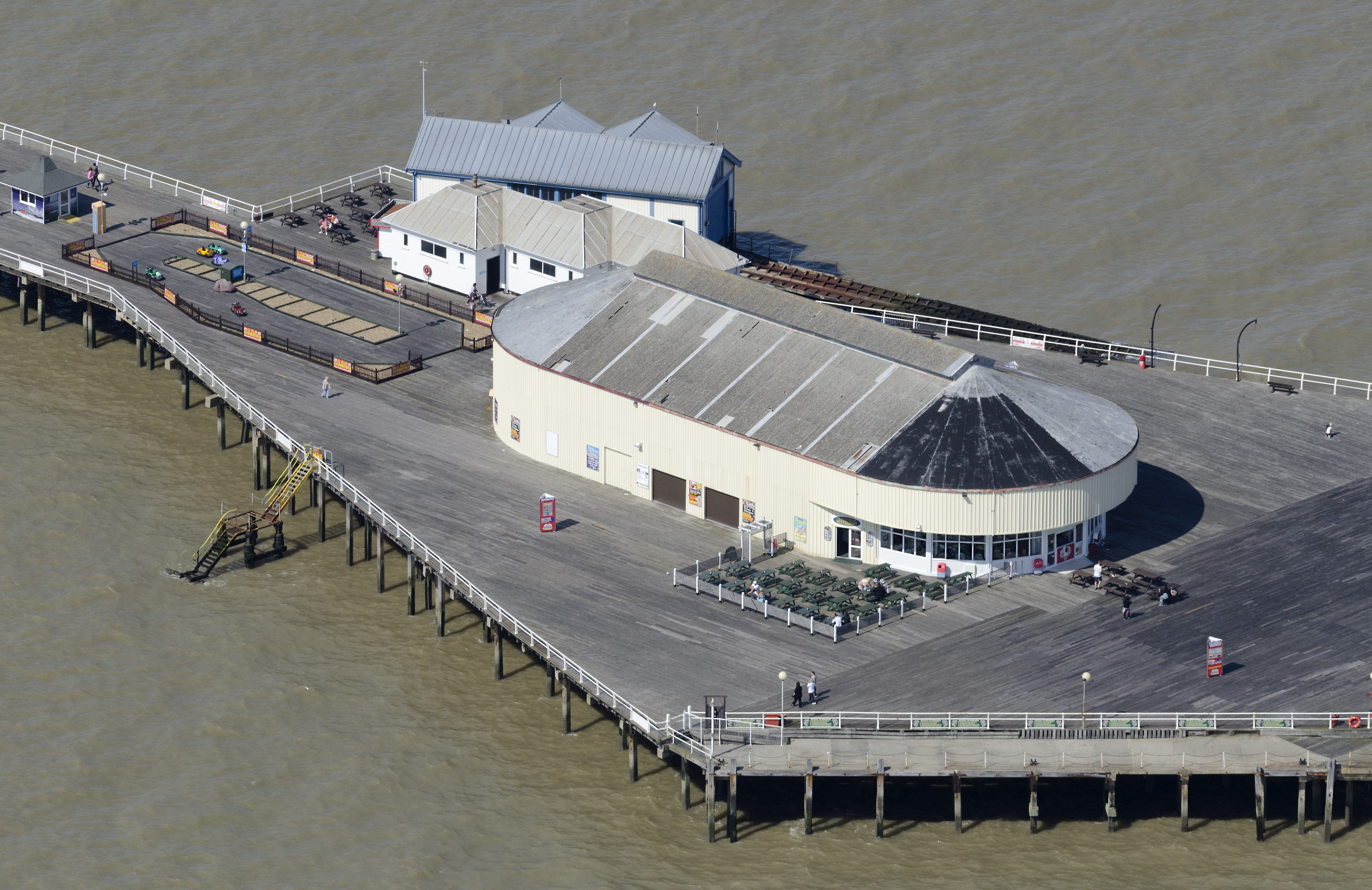
End of the pier, 2015

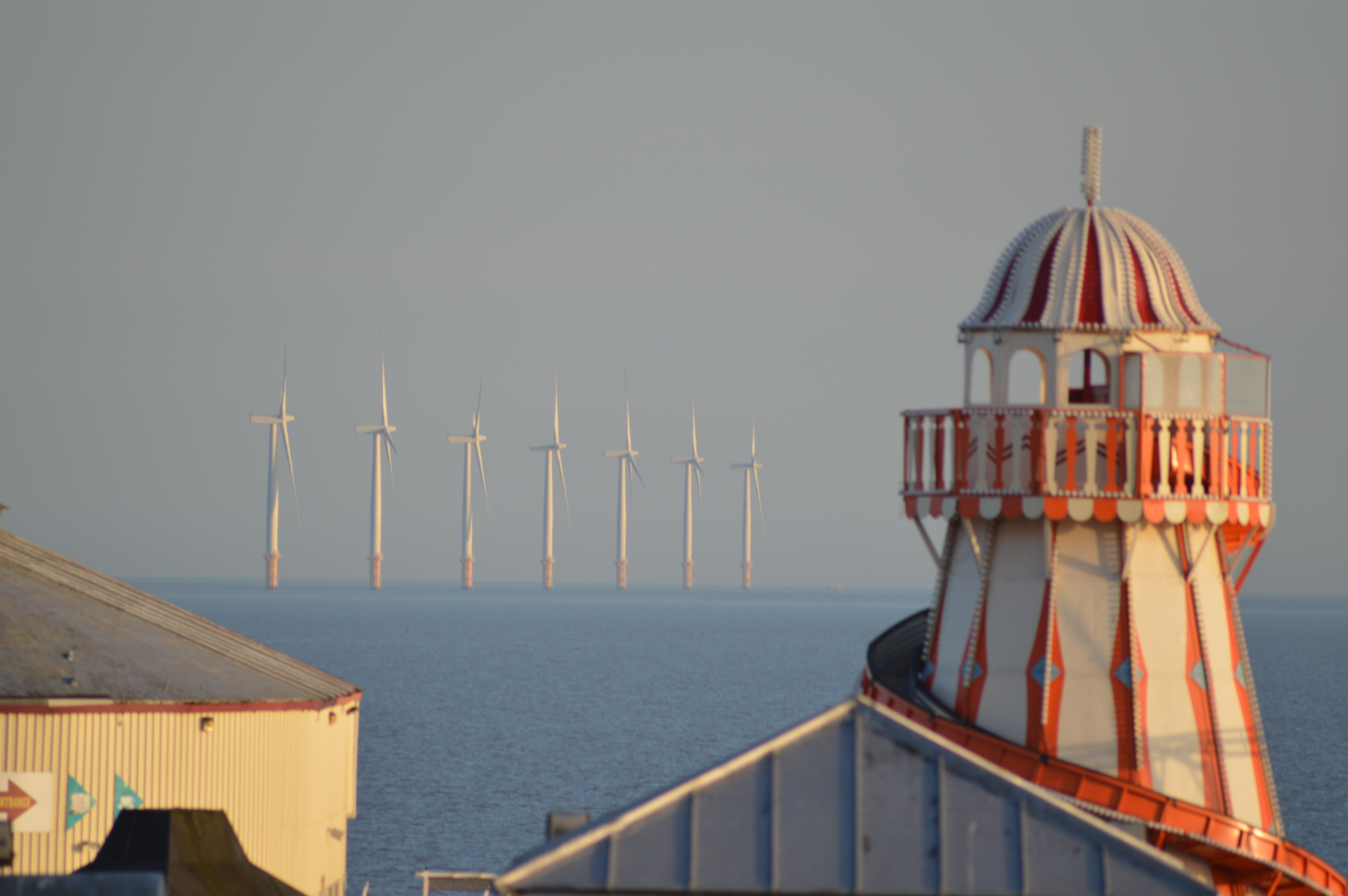
Gunfleet Sands Offshore Wind Farm visible beyond the pier

August 1981 saw local businessmen Francis McGinty, John Treadwell, Denis McGinty and David Howe take ownership of the pier from Michael Goss with plans for a major redevelopment, including the possibility of a bar and disco, reintroduction of the dolphins to the dolphinarium and an upgrade of the pier ride offering. In the succeeding years there were major additions to the pier, including the Whirlwind roller coaster, a circus, ice rink, a roller rink and even a water slide; unfortunately not all of the additions were a success and the pier company struggled financially on a couple of occasions until eventually in around 1993 the operating company went into receivership which is where it remained for around about one year.

In 1994, a local businessman and his family, the Harrisons, bought the pier. They embarked on an ambitious and successful modernisation project to attract 20th century day trippers. The pier emerged as a modern amusement park, unusual in that there are rides as you first enter, with the rest dotted throughout the length of the pier.

In March 2009 the pier was purchased by the Clacton Pier Company, who installed a new focal point, a 50 ft helter-skelter. Originally built in 1949 and used in a travelling show, it was featured in a 2008/2009 Marks & Spencer television advert. The helter-skelter collapsed during the St Jude storm on 28 October 2013.

Clacton Pier ranked number 8 on list of Essex worst attractions in November 2026 but this was rejected by the bosses of Clacton Pier stating they have won multiple awards many years in a row

== Current Rides & Attractions ==
Outdoor amusements on the pier

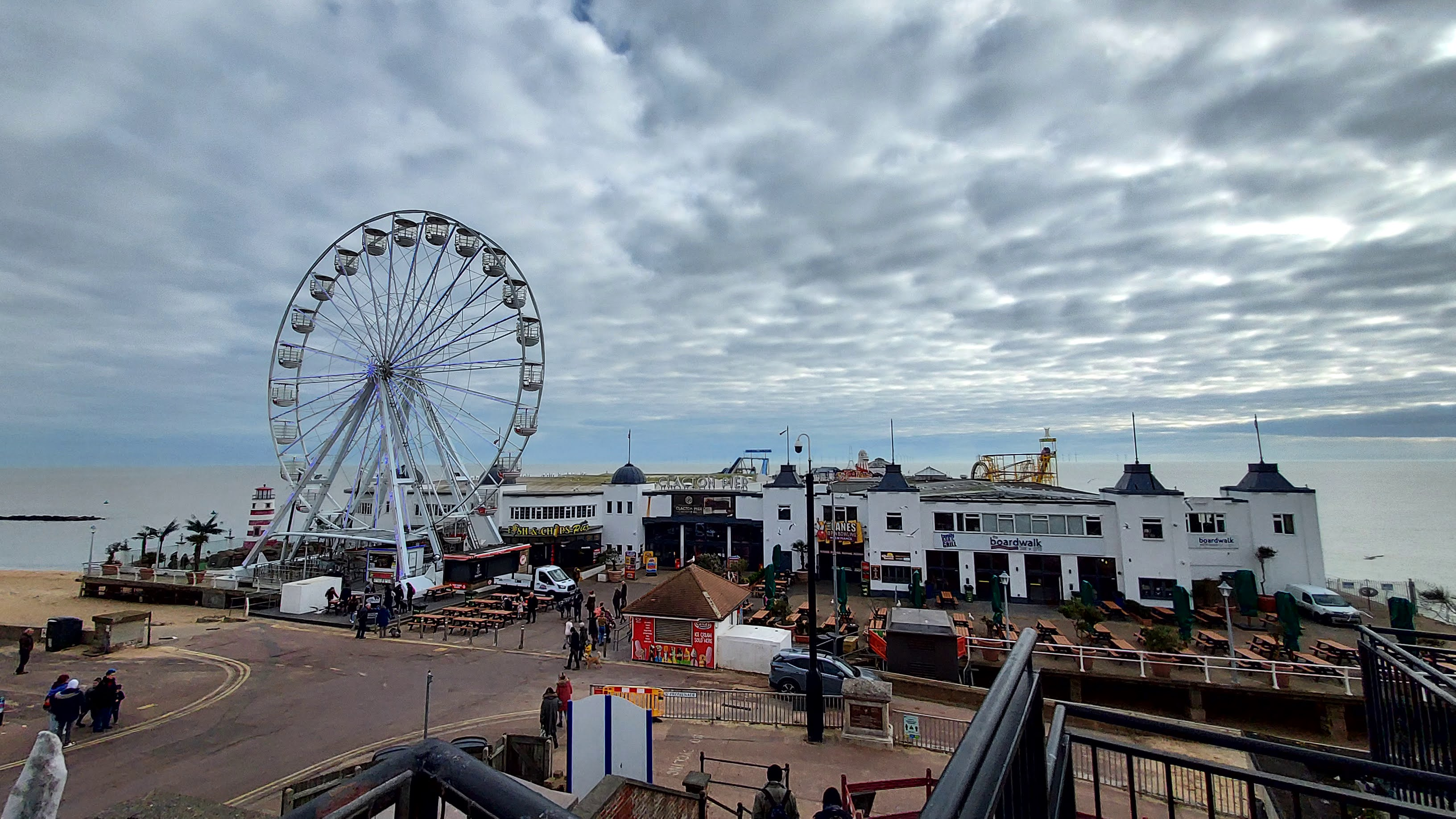
in 2023

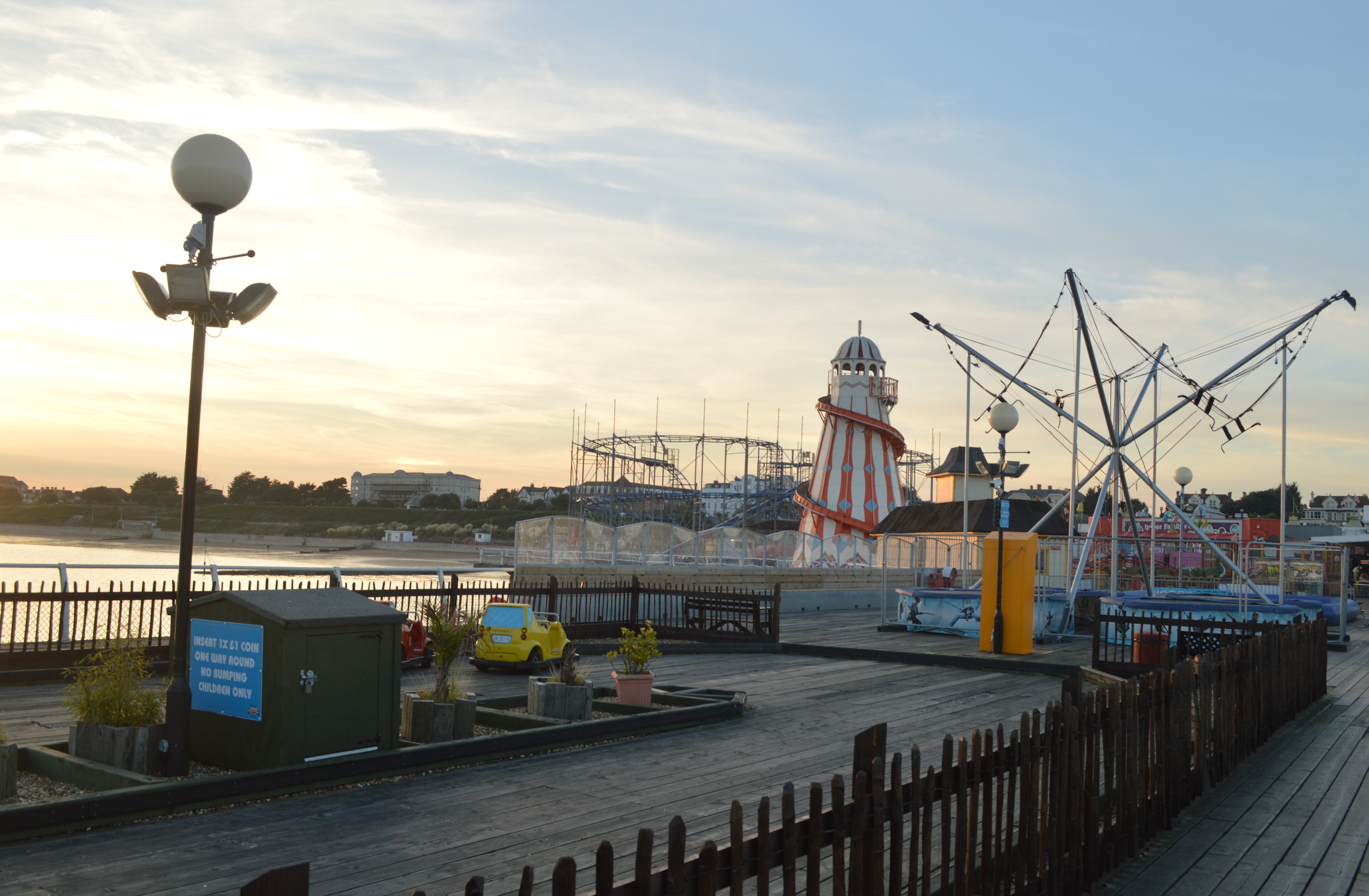
in 2013

Name	Manufacturer	Opened	Description
Looping Star	Pinfari	2021	Rollercoaster featuring one inversion, replacing Stella's Revenge. Initially planned to be opened for the 2020 season, but delayed due to storm damage in February 2020.
Wheel Experience Big Wheel	Mondial	2021	110 ft observation wheel offering views of the Clacton coastline.
White Water Log Flume	Reverchon	2020	A Reverchon Log Flume ride, consisting of multiple 'boats', styled as logs, which traverse a small circuit, featuring two drops.
Miami Beach Party	Kirdale Engineering	May 2016	A beach themed Miami ride. Other Miami rides have previously operated on site.
Thunder Dome Waltzer	Maxwell	1995	A traditional Waltzer ride. The ride started its life under the ownership of Brian Collins at Alton Towers in 1979. The ride left Alton Towers with Collins to open at the short-lived Atlas Park in Clacton-on-Sea (formerly Butlin's Clacton) in 1984. The ride was sold to Keith Emmett in 1987 and spent the season at Sandy Bay in Exmouth, Devon. At the end of 1987 the ride was sold to Albert Heal who operated Peter Pan's Playground on Brighton seafront, and the ride remained in place until the end of 1994.
Twister	Sonacase	March 2001	A modern version of a classic Twist (ride). Replaced an older Bennett version of the same ride type, which was traded in to manufacturer Sonacase in a part-exchange deal.
Giant Helter Skelter		2013	A traditional Lighthouse Slip slide, originally built in 1949. An almost identical ride operated on site many years ago.
Aqua Blast Lagoon Bumper Boats		2016	A small set of Bumper Boats located on part of the site of the old swimming pool.
Wild Mouse Coaster	D.P.V. Rides		A junior figure-8 rollercoaster suitable for small children, with a mouse-themed train. Formerly called "Speedy Gonzales".
Petrol Go Karts		2014	A double deck figure-8 go kart track, located on part of the site of the old swimming pool. A similar ride (but with electric pick-up powered karts) called "Speedway" operated on site many years ago.
Scalextric			A collection of vehicles on a dual-level track, suitable for young children.
Dumbos	Modern Products		A Family ride of six Flying Elephants
Race-o-Rama		2021	
Jumping Jacks Trampolines			
Mini Wheel	SBF		

== See also ==
- List of piers in the United Kingdom

Awards and achievements
Preceded by Worthing Pier	National Piers Society; Pier of the Year; 2020	Succeeded by Clevedon Pier
