= Beastie (Alton Towers) =

Removed steel junior roller coaster

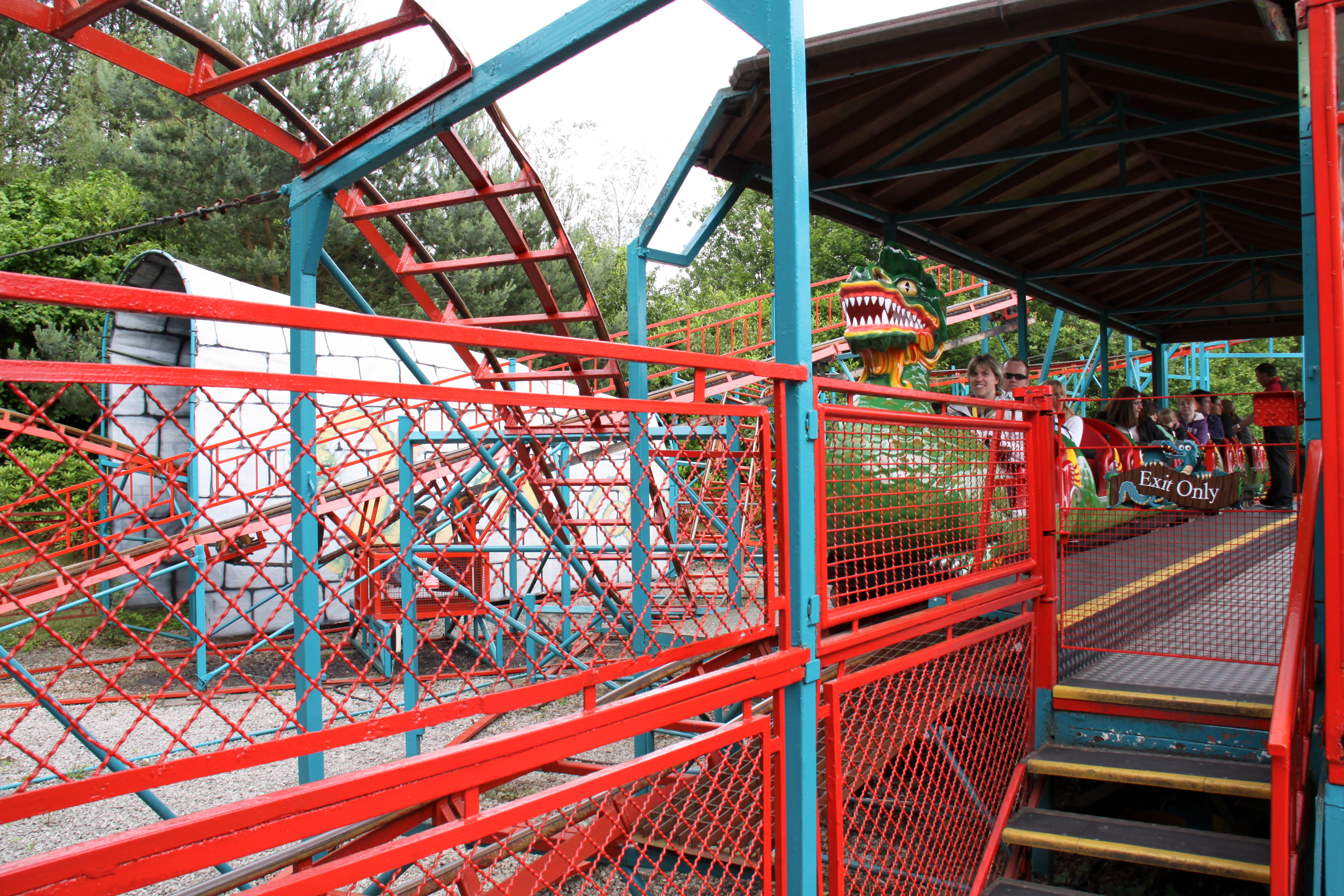

Alton Towers
- Location: Alton Towers
- Park section: Adventure Land
- Coordinates: 52.989269°N 1.894549°W
- Status: Removed
- Opening date: 1983
- Closing date: 7 November 2010
- Replaced by: Octonauts Rollercoaster Adventure

General statistics
- Type: Steel
- Manufacturer: Pinfari
- Model: Super Dragon MD31
- Lift/launch system: Chain lift hill
- Height: 13 ft (4.0 m)
- Drop: 11 ft (3.4 m)
- Length: 436 ft (133 m)
- Speed: 17 mph (27 km/h)
- Duration: 1:45
- Max vertical angle: 36°
- Capacity: 200 riders per hour
- Beastie at RCDB

Beastie was a steel family roller coaster made by Pinfari of Italy. The coaster was located in the Adventure Land area of Alton Towers in Staffordshire, England. The ride featured a tunnel and performed two laps of the circuit each run.

Originally opening in the Festival Park (now Dark Forest) area of the park under the name Mini-Dragon, it allowed younger visitors of the park to experience the thrill of a roller coaster. It was renamed in 1987 to just the "Dragon". In 1993 it was then moved to the Thunder Valley section of the park where it assumed the name "Beastie" after a larger roller coaster in the area, called The Beast. It stayed here for several years, up to the 1998 season when it was moved to the Adventure Land section of the park. The ride was very compact and contained several head chopper effects.

In 2009, it became the Alton Towers' oldest operating roller-coaster following the closure of the Corkscrew the previous year. In early 2011, it was revealed that Beastie would not be operating again. It was removed from the park just before the 2013 season and was eventually sold to an independent ride operator, who renamed the coaster as Dragon Challenge, which currently operates at Barry Island Pleasure Park.

In 2015, Octonauts Rollercoaster Adventure, a Zamperla family coaster, opened on where Beastie once stood. The site of the coaster is now part of CBeebies Land.
