= Barry's Amusements =

Amusement park in Northern Ireland

Curry's Fun Park
- Previously known as Barry's
- Logo until 2022
- Interactive map of Curry's Fun Park
- Location: 16 Eglinton Street, Portrush, County Antrim, Northern Ireland
- Coordinates: 55.203°N 6.654°W
- Status: Operating
- Opened: 1925; 101 years ago (as Barry's), 2022; 4 years ago (as Curry's)
- Closed: September 2019; 7 years ago
- Owner: Trufelli family (former)
- Operated by: Curry family
- Slogan: "Let the fun begin"
- Operating season: Spring/summer

Attractions
- Roller coasters: 1
- Water rides: 1
- Website: www.barrysamusements.com
- Reopened in 2022 as Curry's Fun Park

Barry's Amusements was an amusement park in Northern Ireland. Located in the centre of Portrush, County Antrim, on the north coast, it was founded in 1925. The owners offered it for sale in 2019 and it was reported to be sold for redevelopment in 2021. In April 2022, it reopened under lease as Curry's Fun Park.

== Park ==
The amusement park occupies 2.23 acres (0.90 ha) in the center of Portrush; as of 2013 it was the largest amusement park in Northern Ireland. It has a mixture of traditional and modern amusements and was normally open from Easter Monday until the first week in September. Barry's employed many teenagers and university students from the area.

== History ==
Barry's was founded in 1925 by the married couple of Francesco Trufelli, a former trapeze artist and manager of the Royal Italian Circus, and Evelyn Chipperfield of the Chipperfield's Circus family, and remained a family business; as of 2006, when the BBC broadcast a documentary on the park, it was run by sisters Lisa and Kristina Trufelli, the fourth generation. It became the longest-running amusement park in Northern Ireland. The couple toured with the circus and then opened the amusement park in 1926 after being invited by the local railway company to permanently locate on a site beside the railway station; according to the company history, rather than use either of their family names, they named it 'Barry's' after the first supplier to arrive on-site, Barr. The family at one time also operated Barry's amusement parks in Belfast and Bangor.

The park was offered for sale in November 2019 as a going concern, but was unable to open for the 2020 season because of the COVID-19 pandemic. In May 2021 it was offered for sale as a development opportunity. An online petition was launched protesting against development. In early August, Barry's was reported sold to property developer Michael Herbert. In September 2021, the new owner sought a tenant to operate it as an entertainment or leisure venue; in March 2022 the Curry family, who operate Curry's Fun Park in Salthill, in County Galway, announced that they had signed a long-term lease and planned to reopen Barry's at Easter, also as Curry's Fun Park Portrush. It reopened on 9 April 2022.

== Attractions ==
Incomplete list

=== Current Attractions ===
Name	Picture	Opened	Brief Description
Aqua Valley		2023-2025	Reverchon log flume. Replaced the Big Dipper. 1st water ride since the closure of Turtle Splash in 2019.
The Beast		2022	KMG Afterburner. located at the front of the park.
Crazy Caterpillar		2022	A children's roller coaster, replaced Speedy Mouse.
Crazy Frog		2022	A Jumpin Frog Jump and Smile manufactured by Safeco. Jumping frog ride
Carousel		1964–2019	A carousel with wooden horses, which move mechanically up and down to simulate galloping; more than 100 years old.
Dodgems		2001	A large dodgem track with 27 cars, each able to seat two people. Received new cars in 2022.
Gallopers		2023	New Carousel
Ghost Train		1968	A dark ride in which a train moves slowly through a tunnel decorated with horror-related items including model skeletons, witches and ghosts; updated in 2018 to include bigger scares such as Count Dracula and Wolfman. One of the last rides left from the Barry's era.
Jumping Astro		2012	A Drop Tower: a gondola is raised to the top and released to free-fall, in this case with several 'bounces', before being slowed by brakes.
Mini Dodgems		2000	Children's dodgems, smaller to enable young children to reach the pedals and steering wheel, and with reduced speed. Received new cars for 2022.
Monte Carlo		2000–2019	A children's ride with a variety of vehicles mounted on a circular platform which spins to give the illusion of driving; updated in 2015.
Swing Chairs		2016/17-19	
Waltzer XXL		2022	
Spinning Coaster		2026	

=== Former attractions ===
Name	Picture	Opened	Brief Description
The Satellite		1985–2005	Replaced by Experience.
Airborne Shot		2016–2019	Manufactured by SBF Visa. Relocated to Wickstead Park in 2021 where it reopened under the name, 'Galaxy Invaders'. Replaced by Crazy Frog.
Big Dipper		2003–2019, 2022	A compact steel roller coaster originally built in 1991 by Pinfari of Italy, updated in 2003. Formerly named Barry's Big Dipper until the park's closure.
Barry's Express		2008–2019	A children's train ride brought in for the 2008 season: a train with three carriages on a circular track, with swaying carriages and music, themed to Thomas the Tank Engine. Currently SBNO.
Cyclone		2001–2019	A thrill twist ride in which riders, in small clustered carriages connected by beams at the top to a central point, were spun in the opposite direction to the ride as a whole and experienced the illusion that the carriages would collide. Replaced by Sizzler.
Children's Speedway		1954–1965	Supercar Track ride
Experience		2006–2016	A thrill ride that replaced the Satellite. Similar to an Orbiter, it was removed in early 2016 and replaced by the Airborne Shot.
Extreme Bike		2015	
Extreme Orbiter		2018–2019	Replaced the Freak Out. Now operates in France. Replaced by Waltzer XXL
Freak Out		2003–2017	A pendulum-based fairground ride: riders sat facing each other on chairs suspended around the bob on the pendulum; the chairs rotated around the axis while the pendulum swung. The pendulum climbed to a maximum angle of 120° and reached a height of 22 metres (72 ft). Replaced by the Extreme Orbiter in 2018.
Helter Skelter		1973–2019	Helter Skelter is a slide built in a spiral around a high tower; users climb the tower on the inside and slide down on a mat.
Speedy Mouse		1999–2019	A children's roller coaster, which was originally themed around a caterpillar. The ride took the passengers through a giant apple; the ride was short, so two rotations were given. In 2010, the ride was refurbished and renamed to Speedy Mouse, with the roller coaster carts designed to look like Speedy Gonzales. The track remained the same, including the apple structure. The coaster was removed and relocated to Rhyl Fun Fair in 2021–2022.
Turtle Splash		2006–2019	A mini log flume designed for children, with the logs in which passengers sit styled as turtles. Manufactured by I.E Park. Believed to be scrapped.

== In popular culture ==
Barry's Amusements, specifically The Big Dipper and Ghost Train, was featured in season 3, episode 3 of television series Derry Girls. This was prior to its closure in 2019 and before the redevelopment of the park.

== See also ==
- List of theme parks in the United Kingdom
