= Codona's =

Amusement park in Aberdeen, Scotland

Codona's Amusement Park
- Logo as of 2026
- Interactive map of Codona's Amusement Park
- Location: Aberdeen, Scotland
- Coordinates: 57°9′4″N 2°4′39″W
- Opened: 1970
- Owner: Alfred Codona

Attractions
- Total: 11
- Roller coasters: 1
- Website: http://www.codonas.com/

Codona's Amusement Park is an amusement park located in Aberdeen, Scotland. It was established by the Codona family in 1970.

The park is located on Beach Boulevard at Aberdeen Beach, adjacent to the Queens Links, on the coast of the North Sea.

== History ==
=== Codona family ===
Francesco Codoni, a Swiss-Italian national from the Ticino region next to the Northern Italian border, immigrated to Scotland in the 1790s. Codoni's descendants worked in circuses throughout Europe, but the majority remained in Scotland. By the early 20th century, members of the Codona family operated travelling fairgrounds and entertainment shows across Scotland, including regular appearances in Aberdeen.

During the 19th century, the family toured Scotland with various circus acts. Francesco Codoni's grandson, Henry (Enrique) Codona, founded the trapeze act "The Flying Codonas". The act was featured in various films, including Varieté (1925). The circus film The Greatest Show on Earth mentions both the Codonas and Costellos as prominent circus families.

Once the Industrial Revolution hit the 1860s, the Scotland-based Codonas purchased steam-powered fairground rides and toured as John Codona's Pleasure Fairs, running it until 1960.

=== Amusement park ===
The Grampian Eye big wheel

In 1969, the Codona family successfully tendered to operate a permanent amusement park on Queens Links in Aberdeen, and the park opened the following year. Alfred Codona took charge of the Aberdeen beachfront amusement park, which eventually became today's Codona's Amusement Park.

In July 2020, Codona's reopened following the easing of COVID-19 restrictions, but was forced to close its rides again days later after being classified as a travelling funfair under Scottish Government regulations. In February 2022 it was reported that the amusement park had suffered a loss of £4.5 million due to the COVID-19 lockdown in the United Kingdom. In 2024, the park underwent a £1.4 million refurbishment, including upgrades to its bowling facilities, bar and indoor areas. In 2025, Codona's was named "Best Day Out" at the Scottish Entertainment and Hospitality Awards.

== Attractions ==
=== Roller coasters ===
Name	Manufacturer	Opened	Description
Family Apple Coaster	Pinfari	2003	A small, sit-down roller coaster designed primarily for children, featuring a standard Big Apple figure-eight layout.

=== Mascot ===
In 2006, the park introduced Dodgem the Dog as its mascot, following a primary school design competition.
