= Pendulum ride =

Type of amusement ride

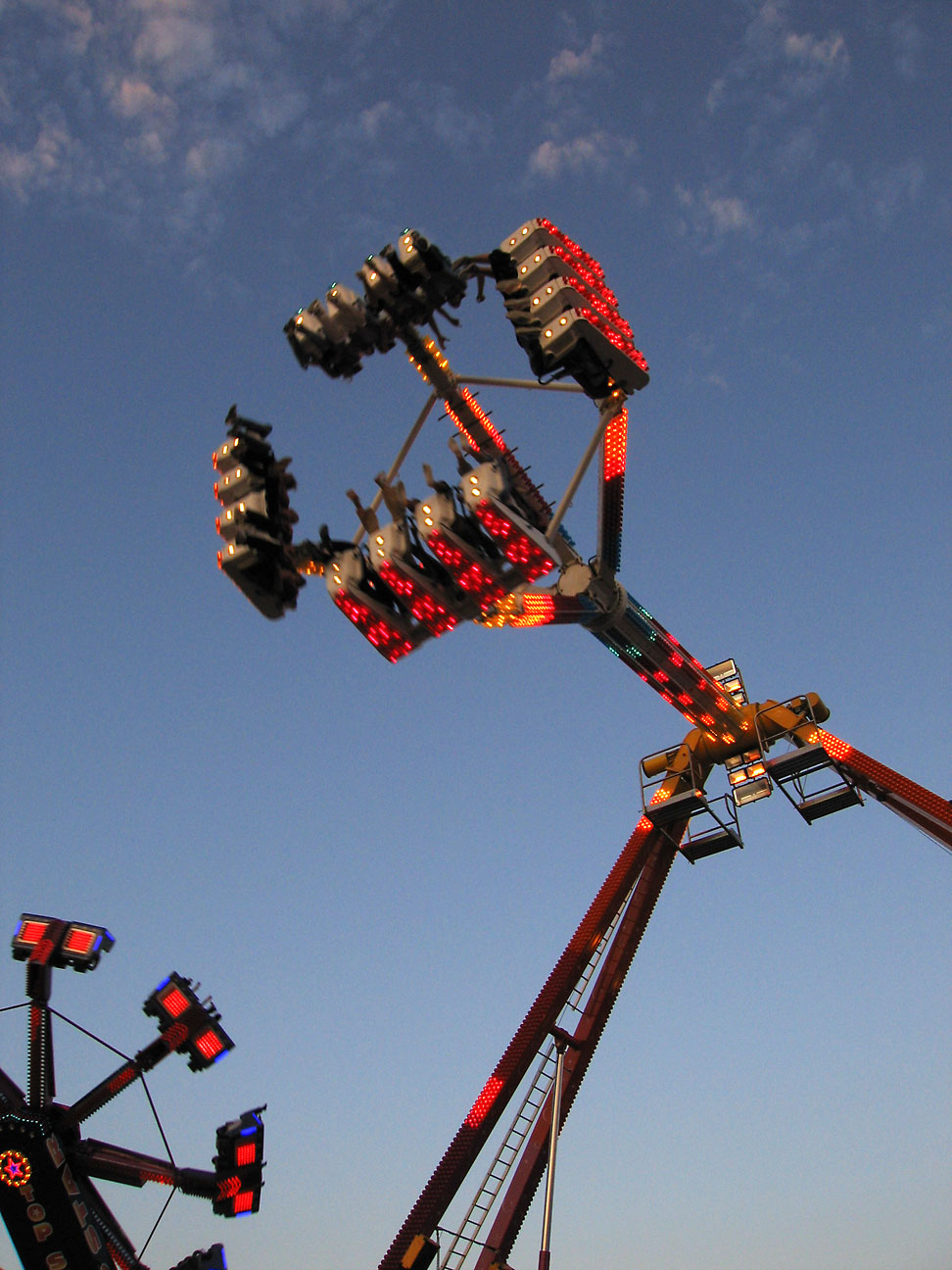
A KMG Freak Out at the top of its swing with Super Star on the left

Pendulum rides are amusement rides based on the motion of a fixed pendulum. The Ali Baba, Looping Starship, and Pirate Ship are some examples.

== Description ==
Pendulum rides are amusement rides based on the motion of a fixed pendulum. The configuration of the ride consists of a gondola, arm, and an axle. One end of the arm is fitted with a passenger-carrying gondola, while the other is attached to the axle. In some models, the arm extends beyond the axle and is fitted with a heavy counterweight. The counterweight is often used when the gondola swings through an inversion. In addition to swinging back and forth, some designs incorporate rotating gondolas and may send riders through a complete inversion. Pendulum rides are propelled by one of two methods: a series of DC motors driving the axle or wheels at the base of the station pushing the gondola as it swings by. Some pendulum rides utilize a diesel engine and clutch at the base that drives a drive wheel to swing the gondola.

== List of rides ==
Rides that can be considered pendulum rides include:

- Afterburner (KMG Rides)
- Air Spider (Fabbri)
- Air Maxx ( Amusement Midway Providers)
- Ali Baba
- Booster (Fabbri)
- Capriolo 8 (Mondial Rides)
- Capriolo 10 (Mondial Rides)
- Capriolo Turbine (Mondial Rides)
- Cyclops
- Explorer Giant (Fabbri)
- Freak Out (KMG Rides)
- Inversion 12 (KMG Rides)
- Inversion 24 (KMG Rides)
- Inversion XXL (Fabbri)
- Joker: Carnival of Chaos (Zamperla)
- Kamikaze Ride (Fabbri/Sartori/ARM Rides/Vekoma/Três Eixos)
- Looping Starship
- Mach 1 (RCS Fun)
- Mach 3 (RCS Fun)
- Mach 5 (RCS Fun)
- Mach 6 (RCS Fun)
- Mini Loop Fighter (Technical Park)
- Mini Typhoon 360 (Technical Park)
- Niagara (Fabbri)
- Pegasus (Technical Park)
- Pirate Ship (Fabbri/Zamperla/Chance/Technical Park...)
- Ranger
- Screamin' Swing
- Sicko (KMG Rides)
- Speed 32 (KMG Rides)
- Speed (KMG Rides)
- Street Fighter Revolution (Technical Park)
- Street Fighter (Technical Park)
- Swing boat
- Topple Tower
- Turbo 360 (Fabbri)
- Typhoon 360 (Technical Park)
- Typhoon (Technical Park)
- Vortex (KMG Rides)
- Voyager/Júpiter (Fabbri)
- XXL (KMG Rides)
