= Colin Bryan =

British businessman (born 1948)

Colin Bryan OBE
- Born: Colin Edward Jarrom Bryan; 1948 (age 77–78); England, UK
- Occupation: Businessman
- Parent(s): George Bryan; Vera Bryan
- Relatives: Andrew Bryan (brother); Jane Bryan (sister)

Colin Edward Jarrom Bryan OBE is a British businessman who was the managing director of Drayton Manor Resort. He rose to the position of managing director in 1973.

== Career highlights ==
Colin Bryan took the reins of the then Drayton Manor Theme Park in 1973, with his brother Andrew and sister Jane taking on respective roles in the company, and his mother Vera Bryan retaining a prominent position.

He has installed rides and attractions at the park, such as Shockwave, Apocalypse, Stormforce 10 and Thomas Land, which have helped the park gain recognition, and become the fifth most visited theme park in the United Kingdom. The family has ploughed more than £30m in the park, with a new ride or attraction added every year.

== Personal life ==
Colin Bryan was born in London in 1948, and was brought up in the world of the theme park industry.
