= Parc des Combes =

Amusement Park in Le Creusot

- Interactive map of Parc des Combes
- Location: Le Creusot, Bourgogne-Franche-Comté, France
- Coordinates: 46.8123°N 4.4117°E
- Opened: 1990
- Operating season: April - October
- Area: 7 ha (17 acres)

Attractions
- Total: 21
- Roller coasters: 3
- Water rides: 3
- Website: www.parcdescombes.com

Parc des Combes is an amusement park located in Le Creusot, in Burgundy, France. The wooded park is a part of the Les Chemins de Fer du Creusot ("Creusot Railways" in English) tourist attraction, served by the Train des Combes tourist train. The French word Combe can be translated as anticlinal valley, given that the park is located on an old Morvan valley. On the top of the hill, near the tourist train station, there is a roller coaster and karting.

== History ==
The 241 P 17 steam locomotive was first built in between 1947 and 1949.

== Attractions ==
=== Roller Coasters ===
Name	Photo	Opened	Manufacturer	Description
Alpine Coaster		2007	Wiegand	A 1,427-foot (435 m) long alpine coaster situated on the park's natural hillside. It is intertwined with the Luge d'été, which follows a similar path.
Boomerang		2011	Vekoma	A Family Boomerang shuttle coaster that was one of the first of its kind, opening two months after the world's first, Accelerator at Drayton Manor
Déval'Train		2003	Vekoma	A 207m-variant junior coaster located at the foot of the hill.

=== Rides ===
Name	Year opened	Manufacturer	Description
Aeroplane	2015	Zamperla	A kiddy plane ride.
Canad'R	2017	Technical Park	A Flying Fury thrill ride, a tower with two separately rotating arms connected to four passenger planes. The planes reach an incredulous top speed of 100 km/h (62 mph), exerting as much as 5 G's on riders. The attraction is the last of its kind following the removal of Vertigo at Tivoli Gardens.
Carrousel	2010	Concept 1900	A children's carousel with various animals and vehicles.
Escadrille	2014	Technical Park	An Aerobat ride where riders control the wings of their single-passenger gondolas to achieve flips. The ride's rotation generates the wind needed to flip riders when their wings are correctly positioned.
Grand Galop	2009	Soquet	A pony track ride.
Grand Roue	2019	Technical Park	A 25-metre (82 ft) tall ferris wheel located at the top of the hill, thus offering a panoramic view of the surrounding area.
Les Toucans	2023	Technical Park	A world's-first "Flying Dutchman" prototype from the manufacturer, effectively serving as a Flying Scooters connected to a 23-metre (75 ft) tall tower.
Luge d'été	1996	Wiegand	The park's oldest and original attraction, a 2,083-foot (635 m) long summer toboggan track where guests ride sleds down the hillside. The track has an uphill length of 656 feet (200 m) and a downhill length of 1,427 feet (435 m), with riders reaching speeds of up to 40 km/h (25 mph).
Montgolfières	2013	Technical Park	A balloon tower ride.
Odysseus	2021	Technical Park	A 30-passenger Pegasus thrill ride, where the seats freely flip around a rotating disk that in turn spins from an arm.
Petites Chaises Volantes	2015	Technical Park	A children's swing ride.
Ronde des Ecureuils	2020	Technical Park	A squirrel-themed teacups ride where the cars are decorated as tree trunks.
Tyrolienne	2006	SunKid Heege	A hipline-style attraction.
Vertingo	2004	Zamperla	A junior drop tower.
Woodside 66	2018	Technical Park	A Sidecar ride in which the vehicles - designed to look like a motorbike and sidecars made out of wood - swing up to an 80° angle around the central column.

=== Water Rides ===
Name	Year opened	Manufacturer	Description
Nautic Jet	2005	SunKid Heege	A Nautic Jet ride launching rider's boats down a ramp and into the pond.
Rivières de l'Ouest	2019	Technical Park	A log flume with two drops, standing 18 feet (5.5 m) and 29.5 feet (9.0 m) tall, respectively.
Rivières des Tonneaux	2015	Soquet	A children's log flume.
