= Boomerang (roller coaster) =

Steel roller coaster

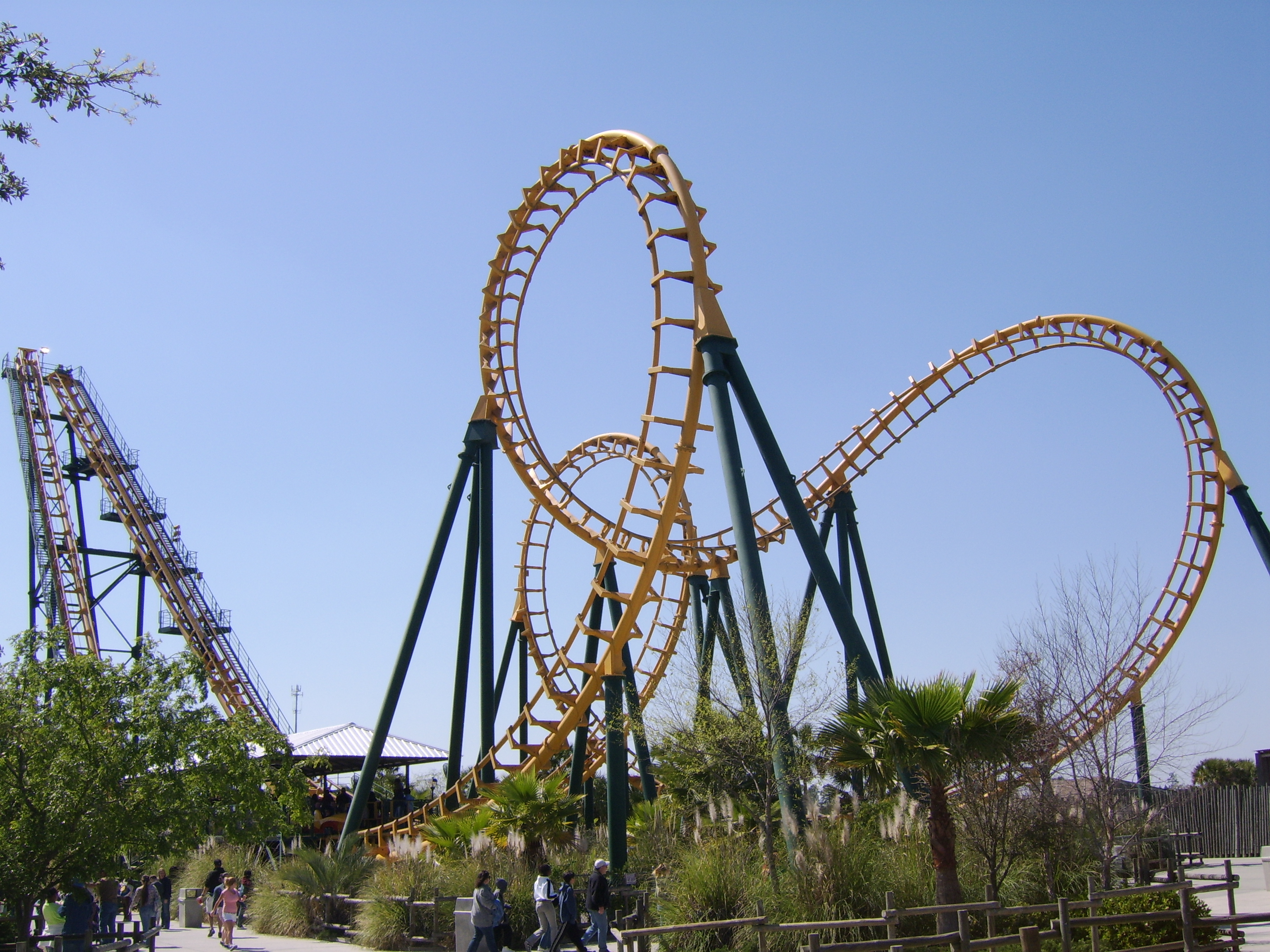
- Boomerang at Wild Adventures
- Status: Discontinued
- First manufactured: 1984
- No. of installations: 55
- Manufacturer: Vekoma
- Height: 35.51 m (116.5 ft)
- Length: 285 m (935 ft)
- Speed: 47 mph (76 km/h)
- G force: 5.2
- Capacity: 760 riders per hour
- Duration: About 1 min 48 sec
- Restraint Style: Over-the-shoulder
- Inversions: 6 [3 on track, but each run traverses the track twice]
- Boomerang at RCDB

Boomerang is a model of shuttle roller coaster manufactured and designed by Vekoma, a Dutch manufacturer. The roller coaster model name is from the hunting implement based on the traditions of the Indigenous Australians. As of January 2023, there are 55 Boomerangs operating around the world.

The roller coaster model was created in the early 1980s and was first introduced at four different parks around the world in 1984.

== Design and ride experience ==
Boomerang's layout design

The Boomerang consists of a single train with seven cars, capable of carrying 28 passengers. The ride begins when the train is pulled backwards from the station and up the first lift hill by a catchcar. After being released, the train passes through the station, enters a Cobra roll element (referred to as a boomerang by the designers) and then travels through a vertical loop. After being pulled up a second lift hill, the train is released to head backwards through each inversion once more, making the total number of inversions per ride six. The train slows down as it passes through the station backwards and then comes to a complete stop in the station. This coaster model is popular among many amusement parks in the United States, but it has appeared at amusement parks around the world.

Boomerang coasters have occasionally stalled, often in the Cobra Roll element. As a precaution, many Boomerang coasters are built with an access platform just under the Cobra Roll/Boomerang element.

During the reverse cycle, riders experience a g force of up to 5.2 when the train re-enters the vertical loop at 47 miles per hour (76 km/h). In back row of the train – the first to enter the loop – this represents one of the most forceful moments seen in steel rollercoaster design.

== Variant designs ==
There are four main design variants based on the Boomerang layout, all of which are produced by Vekoma.

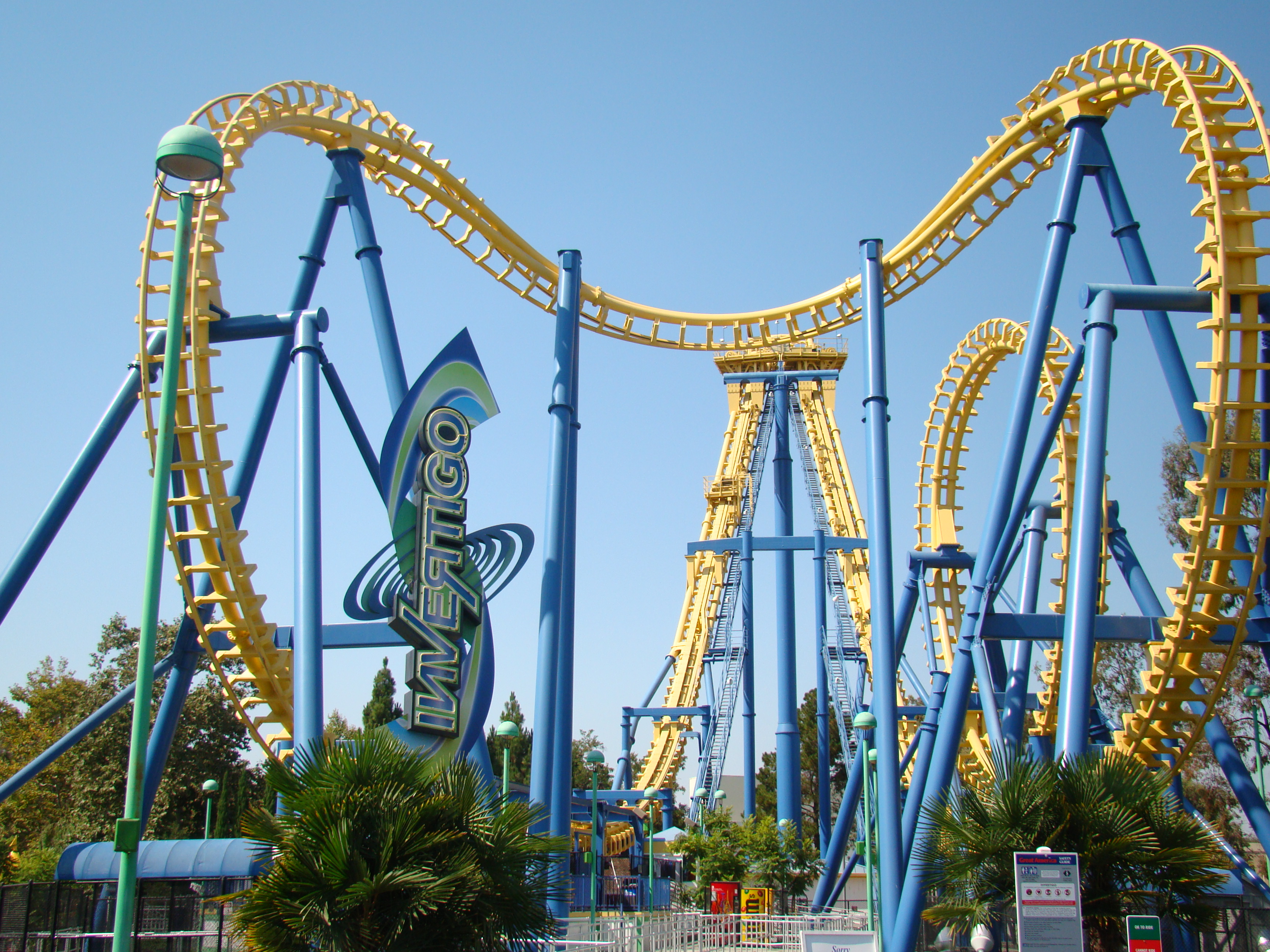
Stinger when it was known as Invertigo at California's Great America

=== Invertigo ===
The first variant of the Boomerang is the Invertigo. While retaining the same layout as the Boomerang, the Invertigo has inverted track, turning it into an inverted roller coaster. Each car has two rows of seats that are back-to-back, so the riders in the back row of each car would be facing those in the front of the trailing car. The first Invertigo, HangOver at Liseberg in Gothenburg, Sweden was supposed to open in 1996 with a new linear induction motor (LIM) or LSM lift. However, development problems delayed the ride's opening to 1997, and the design was remade to include a traditional chain lift like the original Boomerang. Only four Invertigo models were ever built.

=== Giant Inverted Boomerang ===
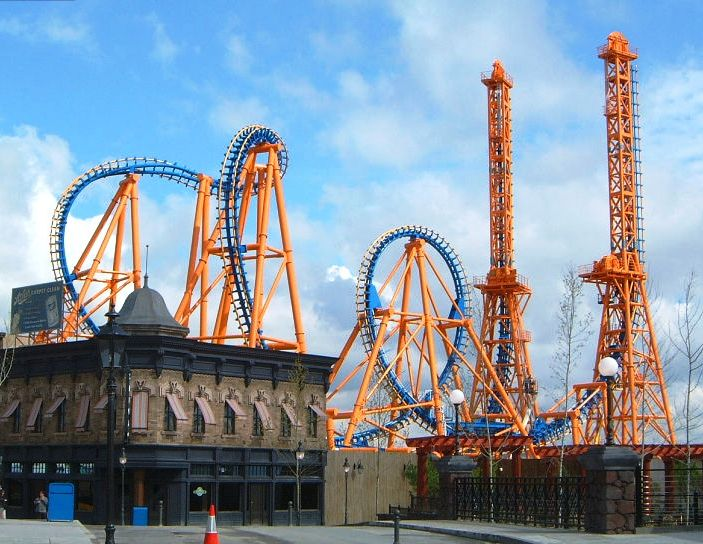
Stunt Fall at Parque Warner Madrid is one of five Giant Inverted Boomerangs built

The second design is known as both the Giant Inverted Boomerang and the Super Invertigo. While maintaining a similar layout to the Boomerang, the track is again inverted and the size of the ride is increased. The track is 270 feet (82 m) longer, the two lift hills are almost 80 feet (24 m) taller and both hills are vertical. As of 2025, three Giant Inverted Boomerangs operate and one is in storage.

=== Family Boomerang ===
In late 2010, Vekoma announced that they would be manufacturing a family-friendly model of the Boomerang. The prototype opened at Drayton Manor Theme Park, as "Ben 10 – Ultimate Mission", in April 2011; it was later renamed to Accelerator. Another model debuted on 17 May 2016 as “Velociraptor”, in the ‘Lost Kingdom’ themed area of Paultons Park. Unlike the other Boomerang roller coasters, a Family Boomerang does not feature inversions, but it still retains a similar shuttle design. The ride features the two signature end-spikes on (more or less) a figure-8 track layout. Phantasialand added the world's largest family boomerang, “Raik”, in 2016. This debuted in the new themed area of ‘Klugheim’, accompanying the adjacent Taron (an Intamin Blitz coaster).

=== Super Boomerang ===
In 2023, a new variant of the Boomerang model opened in Fantawild Wonderland in China. This version uses a launch system rather than a catch car lift hill and has a longer layout and fewer inversions than the normal boomerang and is more similar to rides such as Mr. Freeze and the now defunct Batman & Robin: The Chiller, though it has a swing launch rather than a stationary launch.

== Layouts ==
Layouts of the different variations

Boomerang

Invertigo

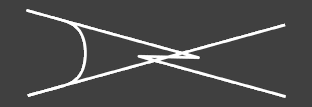
Giant Inverted Boomerang

== Ride locations ==
| Coaster name | Amusement park | Variant | Original opening | Status |
|---|---|---|---|---|
| Accelerator; Formerly Ben 10 - Ultimate Mission | Drayton Manor Theme Park | Family Boomerang 185 m (607 ft) | 2011 | Operating |
| Aftershock; Formerly Déjà Vu | Silverwood Theme Park; Six Flags Great America | Giant Inverted Boomerang | 2008; 2001 | Operating; Closed 2007 |
| Anaconda | Luna Park, Tel Aviv | Boomerang | 2000 | Operating |
| The Bat | Canada's Wonderland | Boomerang | 1987 | Operating |
| Batgirl | Six Flags Mexico; Rafaela Padilla | Boomerang | 1987; 1984 | Operating; Closed 1986 |
| Boomerang | Parc d'atraccions de Montjuïc, Barcelona | Boomerang | 1990 | Closed; Sold to Six Flags New Orleans |
| Boomerang | Bellewaerde | Boomerang | 1984 | Operating |
| Boomerang | Elitch Gardens Theme Park | Boomerang | 1999 | Operating |
| Boomerang | Energylandia | Family Boomerang Rebound | 2017 | Operating |
| Boomerang | E-World | Boomerang | 1995 | Operating |
| Boomerang | Freizeit-Land Geiselwind | Boomerang | 2000 | Operating |
| Boomerang | Fantasilandia | Boomerang | 1996 | Operating |
| Boomerang | Gero Land | Boomerang | 1997 | Operating |
| Boomerang | La Ronde | Boomerang | 1984 | Operating |
| Boomerang | Parc des Combes | Family Boomerang 185 m (607 ft) | 2011 | Operating |
| Boomerang | Parque de la Costa | Boomerang | 1998 | Operating |
| Boomerang | Siam Park City; Jerudong Park Playground | Boomerang | 2007; 1996 | Operating; Closed 2006 |
| Boomerang; Formerly Flashback | Mid America Adventure; Six Flags Over Texas | Boomerang | 2013; 1989 | Operating; Closed 2012 |
| Boomerang: Coast to Coaster | Six Flags Fiesta Texas | Boomerang | 1999 | Operating |
| Boomerang | Trans Studio Bali, Indonesia; Pleasure Island Family Theme Park | Boomerang | 2019; 1993 | Operating; Closed 2016 |
| Boomerang | Walygator Sud-Ouest; Zygo Park | Boomerang | 1992; 1987 | Operating |
| Boomerang | Wiener Prater | Boomerang | 1992 | Operating |
| Boomerang | Wild Adventures | Boomerang | 1998 | Operating |
| Boomerang | Worlds of Fun | Boomerang | 2000 | Operating |
| Boomerang | Family Fun; Tivoli Karolinelund | Boomerang | 2015; 2005 | Operating; Closed 2010 |
| Boomerang (飞旋过山车) | Wuhan Zhongshan Park | Boomerang | 2017 | Operating |
| Boomerang | Yerevan Park | Family Boomerang Rebound | 2021 | Operating |
| Boomerang: Coast to Coaster | Six Flags Darien Lake | Boomerang | 1998 | Operating |
| Boomerang: Coast to Coaster | Six Flags Discovery Kingdom | Boomerang | 1998 | Operating |
| Boomerang Hyper Coaster; Formerly Boomerang | Trans Studio Cibubur, Indonesia; Knott's Berry Farm | Boomerang | 2019; 1990 | Operating; Closed 2017 |
| Boomerang Roller Coaster | Amrapali Funland | Family Boomerang 185 m (607 ft) | 2014 | Operating |
| Boomerang-Roller Coaster | Al-Shallal Theme Park | Boomerang | 2004 | Operating |
| Búmeran; Formerly Boomerang | Parque Diversiones; Playcenter São Paulo | Boomerang | 2012; 1997 | Operating; Closed 2012 |
| Bumerang | Tashkentland | Boomerang | 1995 | Operating |
| Cobra | PowerPark | Boomerang | 2005 | Operating |
| Cobra | Walibi Belgium | Boomerang | 2001 | Operating |
| Cloud Shuttle | Fantawild Wonderland Tongshan | Super Boomerang | 2023 | Operating |
| Diabolik; Formerly Two-Face: The Flip Side | Movieland Park; Six Flags America | Invertigo | 2015; 1999 | Operating; Closed 2007 |
| Family Coaster (合家欢过山车) | Happy Valley | Family Boomerang | 2017 | Operating |
| FamilyBoomerang RollerCoaster | Happy Valley | Family Boomerang Rebound | 2020 | Operating |
| Fireball | Furuvik | Family Boomerang | 2017 | Operating |
| Flashback; Formerly Vampire; Formerly Boomerang | Six Flags New England; Kentucky Kingdom; Nanhu Amusement Park | Boomerang | 2000; 1990; 1985 | Operating; Closed 1999; Closed late 1980s–early 1990s |
| Flashback; Formerly Boomerang: Coast to Coaster | Six Flags Great Escape and Hurricane Harbor | Boomerang | 1997 | Operating |
| The Flying Cobras; Formerly Carolina Cobra; Formerly Head Spin/Mind Eraser | Carowinds; Geauga Lake | Boomerang | 2009; 1996 | Operating; Closed 2007 |
| Frontline Charge (火线 追击) | Fanta Park Glorious Orient Ningbo | Family Boomerang Rebound | 2021 | Operating |
| Frontline Charge (火线 追击) | Fanta Park Glorious Orient Ganzhou | Family Boomerang Rebound | 2021 | Operating |
| Generator | Walibi Rhône-Alpes | Boomerang | 1988 | Operating |
| Giant Inverted Boomerang (巅峰一号) | Jin Jiang Action Park | Giant Inverted Boomerang | 2011 | Closed 2025 |
| Goliath; Formerly Déjà Vu | Six Flags New England; Six Flags Magic Mountain | Giant Inverted Boomerang | 2012; 2001 | Demolished; Closed 2011 |
| Good Gravy! | Holiday World & Splashin' Safari | Family Boomerang | 2024 | Operating |
| High Speed Round Trip | Bao Son Paradise Park | Family Boomerang Rebound | 2019 | Operating |
| Invertigo; Formerly Face/Off | Kings Island | Invertigo | 1999 | Operating |
| Jolly Rancher Remix; Formerly Sidewinder | Hersheypark | Boomerang | 1991 | Operating |
| Light Explorers | Energylandia | Family Boomerang Spirit | 2021 | Operating |
| London Loop | Global Village | Family Boomerang | 2017 | Operating |
| Luna | Liseberg | Family Boomerang | 2023 | Operating |
| Pine Tree Rocket (飞跃狗熊岭) | Oriental Heritage, Shanxi | Family Boomerang Rebound | 2021 | Operating |
| Pine Tree Rocket (飞跃狗熊岭) | Fantawild Land | Family Boomerang Rebound | 2021 | Operating |
| Quantum Leap | Sochi Park | Giant Inverted Boomerang | 2014 | Operating |
| Ragin' Cajun; Formerly Boomerang | Dixie Landing'; Hafan y Môr Holiday Park | Boomerang | 2001; 1987 | Operating; Closed 1998 |
| Raik | Phantasialand | Family Boomerang | 2016 | Operating |
| Recoil; Formerly Thunderbolt | Wonderla Amusement Park Bangalore; Aladdin's Kingdom | Boomerang | 2016; 1994 | Operating; Closed 2009 |
| Recoil; Formerly Zoomerang; Formerly Demon; Formerly Titan | Wonderla Amusement Park Hyderabad; Alabama Adventure & Splash Adventure; Wonderland Sydney; World Expo Park | Boomerang | 2016; 2005; 1992; 1988 | Operating; Closed 2011; Closed 2004; Closed 1988 |
| Recoil; Formerly Colossus | Wonderla Amusement Park Kochi; Habtoorland | Boomerang | 2017; 2004 | Operating; Closed 2011 |
| Saven | Fårup Sommerland | Family Boomerang Spirit | 2020 | Operating |
| Sea Serpent | Morey's Piers | Boomerang | 1984 | Operating |
| Snow Slope | Lusail Winter Wonderland | Family Boomerang Rebound | 2022 | Operating |
| Space Shuttle Max; Formerly Cobra | Enchanted Kingdom; West Midland Safari Park | Boomerang | 1995; 1985 | Operating; Closed 1991 |
| Spartan Race (Chúa tể đấu trường); Formerly Flying Dolphin Coaster | VinWonders Phú Quốc | Family Boomerang 185 m (607 ft) | 2015 | Operating |
| Speed of Sound; Formerly La Via Volta | Walibi Holland | Boomerang | 2000 | Operating |
| Stinger; Formerly Invertigo | Dorney Park & Wildwater Kingdom; California's Great America | Invertigo | 2012; 1998 | Demolished; Closed 2010 |
| Stress Express | Fantawild Dreamland, Fujian | Boomerang | 2013 | Operating |
| Stress Express | Fantawild Adventure | Boomerang | 2012 | Operating |
| Stress Express | Oriental Heritage Jinan | Boomerang | 2015 | Operating |
| Stress Express | Fantawild Dreamland, Hunan | Boomerang | 2016 | Operating |
| Stress Express | Oriental Heritage Jiujiang | Boomerang | 2015 | Operating |
| Stress Express | Oriental Heritage Cixi | Boomerang | 2016 | Operating |
| Stress Express | Fantawild Asian Legend | Boomerang | 2018 | Operating |
| Stress Express | Silk Road Dreamland | Boomerang | 2019 | Operating |
| Stunt Fall | Parque Warner Madrid | Giant Inverted Boomerang | 2002 | Operating |
| Tidal Wave | Trimper's Rides | Boomerang | 1986 | Operating |
| Triops; Formerly Tornado; Formerly Unknown; Formerly HangOver | Bagatelle; Sommerland Syd; Allou Fun Park; Liseberg | Invertigo | 2012; 2005; Never opened 1997 | Operating; Closed 2011; Never opened Closed 2002 |
| Turbo Dino (角龙战车) | Zigong Fantawild Dinosaur Kingdom | Family Boomerang Rebound | 2022 | Operating |
| Tweestryd | Wildlands Adventure Zoo Emmen | (Double) Family Boomerang | 2018 | Operating |
| Velociraptor | Paulton's Park | Family Boomerang | 2016 | Operating |
| Volldampf | Erlebnispark Tripsdrill | Family Boomerang | 2020 | Operating |
| Whirly Roller Coaster; Formerly Boomerang | Floraland Continent Park; Qingdao International Beer City | Boomerang | 2015; 1995 | Operating; Closed 2010 |
| Wipeout; Formerly Missile; Formerly Coca-Cola Roller | Pleasurewood Hills; The American Adventure Theme Park; Glasgow Garden Festival | Boomerang | 2007; 1989; 1988 | Operating; Closed 2004; Closed 1988 |
| Zoomerang | Lake Compounce | Boomerang | 1997 | Operating |
| The Quest | Emerald Park | Family Boomerang Spirit | 2024 | Operating |
| Zydeco Scream; Formerly Boomerang | Six Flags New Orleans; Parc de Montjuic | Boomerang | 2000; 1990 | Removed in 2024 after being SBNO from 2005 to 2024 after Hurricane Katrina; Closed 1998 |
| Unknown | Fantawild, Mudan | Family Boomerang Rebound | 2023 | Under Construction |
| Unknown | Fantawild, Rencheng | Family Boomerang Rebound | 2023 | Under Construction |
| Unknown | Fantawild, Liangyuan | Family Boomerang Rebound | 2023 | Under Construction |
| Unknown | Oriental Heritage, Henan | Family Boomerang Rebound | 2024 | Under Construction |
| Unknown | Oriental Heritage, Jiangxi | Family Boomerang Rebound | 2024 | Under Construction |
| Unknown | Fantawild, Yunnan | Family Boomerang Rebound | 2024 | Under Construction |
| Unknown | Fantawild, Jiangsu | Family Boomerang Rebound | 2024 | Under Construction |
| Unknown | Warner Bros. Movie World | (Double) Family Boomerang | 2024 | Under Construction |
| Unknown; Formerly Déjà Vu | Mirabilandia; Six Flags Over Georgia | Giant Inverted Boomerang | TBD; 2001 | In Storage; Closed 2007 |
| The Flash: Vertical Velocity | Six Flags Great Adventure | Super Boomerang | 2025 | Operating |

== See also ==
- Invertigo (roller coaster)
- Giant Inverted Boomerang
