= Klondike Gold Mine =

Roller coaster at Drayton Manor Theme Park

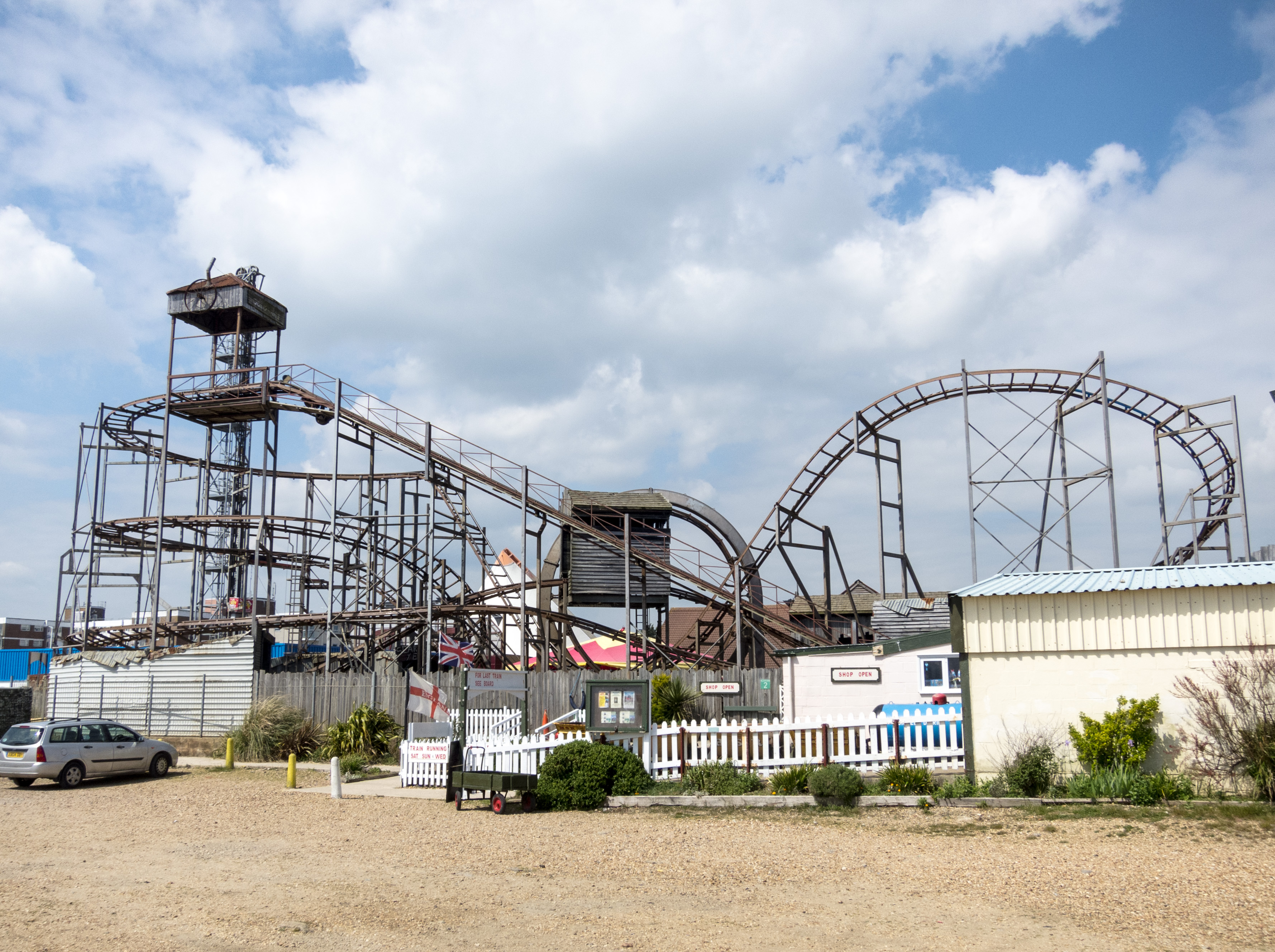

Funland Hayling Island
- Coordinates: 50°47′3.85″N 0°59′14.54″W
- Status: Removed
- Opening date: 2005
- Closing date: September 6, 2015

Drayton Manor
- Coordinates: 52.609°N 1.713°W
- Status: Removed
- Opening date: 1995
- Closing date: 2004

General statistics
- Type: Steel
- Manufacturer: Pinfari
- Designer: Pinfari
- Model: ZL42
- Lift/launch system: Chain lift hill
- Height: 11 m (36 ft)
- Length: 365 m (1,198 ft)
- Speed: 80 km/h (50 mph)
- Inversions: 1
- Klondike Gold Mine at RCDB

Klondike Gold Mine was a steel roller coaster at Funland Hayling Island. It was previously installed at Drayton Manor Theme Park, and transferred in 2005.

== History ==
Klondike Gold Mine opened in 1995 at Drayton Manor Theme Park as a replacement for The Python, a roller coaster of the same model which operated from 1985 to 1994. Klondike Gold Mine was manufactured by Pinfari, and installed and themed at a cost of £750,000 (equivalent to £1,541,934 in 2025). The ride was themed to the American gold rush featuring trains modeled after minecarts.

The ride was transferred to Funland Hayling Island in 2005, being replaced by G-Force at Drayton Manor, replacing a roller coaster already on site, and became one of the main rides at Funland. It was replaced by Crazy Mouse style ride called Runaway Mine Train (originally from Gulliver's World).

In 2015, the ride was removed from Funland and was sold to Irish company Euroshow. In late 2018, the ride was sold again to Deggeller Attractions in the United States, becoming the only traveling coaster in the country to feature a loop.
