= Funland Hayling Island =

Amusement park on Hayling Island, near Portsmouth, England

Coordinates: 50.785°N 0.985°W

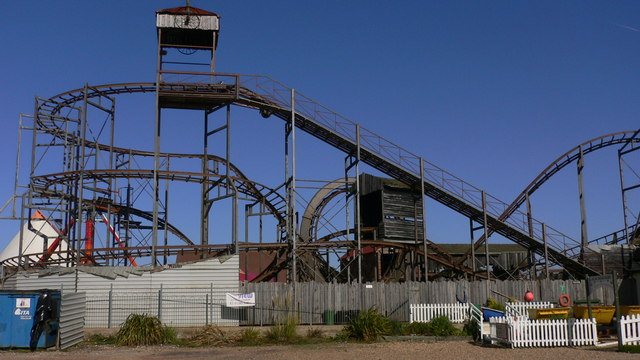
- Funland, taken from the beach
- Interactive map of Funland Hayling Island
- Location: Hayling Island, Portsmouth, England
- Status: Operating
- Opened: 1946; 80 years ago
- Owner: Marshall Hill, Jimmy Cogger
- Slogan: Family fun for over 70 years
- Operating season: January to Late October (Opening Times vary); Late November to Late December (for the Winter Wonderland Event)

Attractions
- Total: 19
- Roller coasters: 2
- Water rides: 1
- Website: funland.info

Funland Hayling Island is an amusement park on Hayling Island, in the Havant district, in the county of Hampshire, England.

Funland Hayling Island contains 18 rides, an amusement arcade (as well as various independently operating arcades nearby), Diane's Diner, a kids' play area and a pirate-themed golf course.

The park is a typical funfair-styled park with the rides mainly being travelling rides from various independent funfair operators, with some rides sourced from other amusement parks.

== History ==
Funland amusement park opened in 1984 on the site of a former Butlins which dated back to the 1930s. In 1977 the freehold for the land was passed from Billy Butlin to the Hill family who had been tenants on the land since the 1940s. The Hills built the park and upcycled signage from a nearby closed amusement arcade known as Funland. The modern Funland has survived three generations with the Hill family and is currently operated by Marshall Hill.

=== 2000's ===
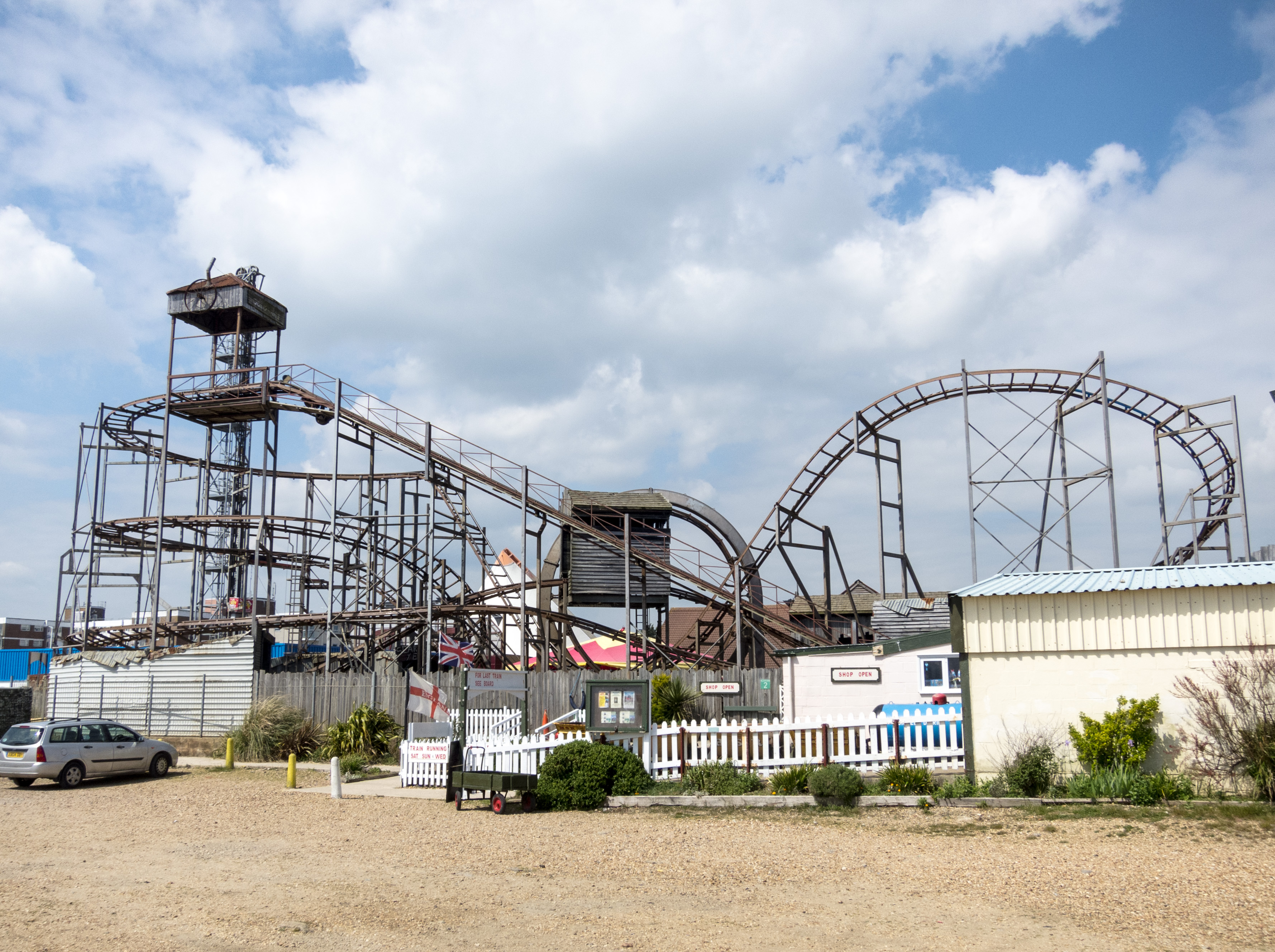
Klondike Gold Mine ride

The 2003 season saw the addition of some brand new rides: The first was Tornado, a frisbee ride. Other rides that were added were a Breakdance, and a themed Teacups ride called Cannibal Pots. The park's Pirate Ship was also removed that year.

In 2004, a new larger Pirate Ship ride named Galleon was added to the park, replacing the older smaller ship. The Park's Zyclone coaster was removed from the park that year.

For the 2005 season, after the Zyclone coaster was sold to Tier Prince Fun Park, the park purchased Drayton Manor's Klondike Gold Mine coaster. The Drop Tower formerly sourced at the Trocadero was finally added to the park after two years of troubled planning permissions.

In 2006, the park added a second smaller Log Flume in the park's former car parking lot called Blizzard Falls. In 2007, the Tornado Frisbee ride was replaced with a new model called Tornado 2.

In 2008, Funland purchased many rides from Drayton Manor's Robinsons Land section after its transformation into Thomas Land. Rides that were added were the Super Dragon coaster, the Whirlycopters, the Frog Hopper, Cadbury's Junior Pirate Ship and the Samba Balloons. At the end of the season, the Galleon Pirate Ship and the Junior Pirate Ship were closed and sold.

For the 2009 season, a Plane Ride was added.

=== 2010's ===
No new rides were added in 2010, however Tornado 2 was sold onto independent operators after that year. A traveling orbiter ride named Speed Flip was added to the park for the 2011 season alongside 2012 to replace it.

The 2013 season saw the park purchase a Miami Extreme ride from an independent operator, while the 2014 season saw the park purchase a traveling Twister ride, named Cyclone, which was added to the park that year replacing Breakdancer, which was sold to Luna Park Sunny Beach. 2014 also saw the removal of Toy Town Express.

The 2015 season saw two-new rides added to the park; A pirate-ship-themed Galleon ride, alongside a new addition to the park's Dinosaur-themed section called Jurassic Safari, a car ride that replaced the Toy Town Express convoy ride. The Blizzard Falls log flume was renamed to Dino Falls in order to match the theme.

In 2016 a new roller coaster replacing the Klondike Gold Mine, which is called Runaway Mine Train, originally located at Gulliver's World as the Wild Mine Ride. In June, the park added a new Snake Helter-Skelter ride replacing the old one, and the Super Dragon returned after a refurbishment with a new dinosaur theme and name; Funlandosarus. After the 2016 season ended the Woody Coaster was removed from the park.

In 2017, two new rides were opened: A Tilt-A-Whirl called Neptune's Fury, which replaced the Woody Coaster, and a Mini Paratrooper ride. Both had been acquired from Pleasure Island Family Theme Park after its closure in 2016. The Mini Paratrooper was later replaced with a Carousel that was purchased from the Liseberg amusement park in Sweden, which the park has since purchased some rides from. The Drop Tower was removed from the park after the end of the 2017 season after standing there but not operating.

For 2018, a caterpillar-themed Rock 'n' Tug ride was added to the park. No new rides were added in 2019. After the 2019 season the Super Dragon was removed from the park and sold.

=== 2020's ===
In 2020, Funland purchased a Flying Elephants ride and a Viking ride from Liseburg.

In 2021, the tarpaulin was removed from the middle of the park. a Ghost Train called "Destination Z" was added to the park upon opening for the 2021 season.

== Rides ==
=== Rollercoasters ===
Name	Year	Operational Status	Manufacturer	Description
Runaway Mine Train	2016	Operating	L & T Systems	A roller coaster based on a spinning wild mouse ride, This coaster was formerly located at Gulliver's World.
Spinosaurus	2022	Operating		A Spinning Coaster. It originally soft-opened during Funland's Winter Wonderland event in December 2021 before fully opening in February 2022. It was originally located at Gulliver's Land as "Twist 'N' Joust".

=== Dark Rides ===
Name	Year	Manufacturer	Description
Destination Z	2021		A Ghost Train ride with live actors. This is housed inside a former arcade near the beach. The ride was previously used as an outdoor train ride at Oakwood Theme Park and beforehand Camelot Theme Park. It only operates during evening sessions.

=== Flat Rides ===
Name	Opened	Manufacturer	Description
Cyclone	2015	P.W.S	A standard Twister ride. It was originally owned by various independent operators before being purchased by the park as a permanent attraction. For 2024, the ride will see a new colour-scheme.
Dodgems	Unknown	Barbieri	A standard bumper car ride. It is located in the main Funland building, where the arcade is.
Dragon's Breath	2020	Zierer	A Viking boat ride where boats rotate similar to a carousel and go through water. It previously operated at Liseberg. Was known as Viking Boats for 2020.
Dragons Rush	2025	Zierer	A Sea Storm ride formerly located at Paultons Park, where it was known as Dragon Roundabout.
Flying Elephants	2020	Interlink	A standard elephant-themed jets ride that previously operated at Liseberg. The ride opened on the former site of the Super Dragon roller coaster but moved following the 2021 season to make way for the new Spinosaurus rollercoaster. The ride currently sits on the former site of Neptune's Fury
Soaring Seagulls	2022	Zamperla	A Magic Bikes ride that was purchased from Dreamland Margate.
Surf's Up	2024	Technical Park	Giant Miami ride, the largest of its type in the United Kingdom.

=== Water Rides ===
Name	Opened	Manufacturer	Description
Jungle Splash	1990	Big Country Motioneering	A large-scale log flume with a large drop. Previously known as "Flume of Doom" (2020-2022), "Wild River" (1990-2014) and "Beaver Creek Log Ride" (2015-2019). The ride was planned to be scrapped in late 2022 as it was past the end of its life with an expanded Dino Falls taking over, but the park instead decided to invest in the attraction giving it a refurbishment and a complete 'reimagining'.

=== Children's Rides and Attractions ===
Name	Opened	Manufacturer	Description
Aztec Falls	2023	Zamperla	A Zamperla magic bus style ride that was relocated from Paultons Park. The ride is located on the site where Dino Falls log flume formerly was.
Carousel	2017	Preston & Barbieri	A modern version of a classic Carousel ride. It previously operated at Liseberg in Sweden.
Giant Yo-Yo Ride	2024	S&W Amusement Sales	A junior Chair-O-Planes ride. Formerly operated at Adventure Wonderland.
Jurassic Safari	2015	Zamperla	A car ride with a dinosaur theme.
Pirates Adventure Golf	Unknown	Unknown	A miniature golf course with a pirates theme.
Ride on Bikes	2016	Unknown	A bumper car styled ride.
Samba Balloon	2008	Zamperla	A Samba Balloon ride which previously operated at Drayton Manor.
Snake Helter-Skelter	2016	Zapfun	A snake-themed helter skelter that previously operated at Adventure Island. It is also known as Sid's Sizzling Snake Slide.

== Removed Attractions ==
Name	Added	Removal	Description
Crazy Caterpillar	2018	2024	A small Rock and Tug ride themed as a caterpillar, manufactured by Zamperla. It previously operated in the Romanian fairground circuit for a time. It was relocated to Lightwater Valley for the 2025 season and renamed as Spin Bug.
Animal Express	1970	2023	A small novelty mini train ride built by Supercar that spins around in a circle. Formerly known as Trains (1970-2020). Currently sits in storage.
Galleon Ride	2015	2023	A pirate ship-themed Jets ride built by Manorplan Leisure. The ride previously operated at Twycross Zoo for a time. It was sold after the 2023 season to Fishers Farm and renamed as Flying Galleons.
Extreme	2013	2023	A standard Miami ride built by Nottingham UK. The ride was previously owned by an independent operator and also operated at Bayside Fun Park. The ride was dismantled and sold at the end of the 2022 Season to independent operators to fund costs for the refurbishment of the Flume of Doom, although it eventually went under refurbishment in 2023, and returned to the park in July under loan.
Dino Falls	2006	2022	A small Dinosaur-themed Log Flume Manufactured by L&T Systems that was built on a portion of the park's former parking lot. It was planned to be expanded for the 2023 season replacing Flume of Doom, but the park instead sold the ride to Fishers Farm in Wisborough to then operate as Jungle Glume. Previously known as Blizzard Falls (2006-2015).
Neptune's Fury	2017	2021	A Tilt-A-Whirl ride with seashell-type cars built by Empire Amusements that previously operated at Pleasure Island Family Theme Park. Was later sold to the Gulliver's Theme Park chain and currently sits in storage at Gulliver's Valley.
Frog Hopper	2008	2020	A mini drop tower built by Zamperla and was originally located at Drayton Manor (1998–2007). Removed and sold off after the 2020 season.
Super Dragon	2008	2019	A small Pinfari MD31 junior coaster originally located at Drayton Manor (1984–2008), being added in the park's former car-parking spot. The coaster operated as is for many years (although the tarpaulin's "DRAYTON MANOR" text was altered slightly to read "DRAGON MANOR"), until receiving a support repaint a few years into operation at Funland, making the supports purple while receiving an unofficial secondary name of "Junior Dragon Coaster". In 2016, the ride was refurbished with a dinosaur theme, with the track being painted green and dinosaurs placed all around the ride, being known as Funlandasarus. The ride was removed after the 2019 season and was sold to Camel Creek Adventure Park in Cornwall for the 2021 season, where it was renamed as "Magic Dragon".
Cannibal Pots	2003	2019	A teacups ride built by Technical Park themed after cannibal pots. The ride started under the big tent area of the park before being moved outside following the removal of the Pirate Ship. The ride previously operated at another park, and was relocated to Fantasy Island for the 2020 season and renamed "Firebowl".
Flying Saucer	2016	2018	A small spinning ride built by Modern Products. The ride previously operated at Paulton's Park for two decades before moving to Funland. It was known as UFO Ride for the 2016 Season. It was relocated to Willows Activity Farm in 2019.
Bat Race	2017	2017	A small Paratrooper (ride) built by Modern Products and previously operated at Flamingo Land. It was removed after being placed in the park because the owners thought the ride was too small, and so it was replaced with a Carousel. The ride was later purchased by Animal Farm Adventure Park for the 2018 season.
Red Baron Plane Ride	1998	2016	A spinning plane ride. Scrapped in 2017.
Woody Roller Coaster	2001	2016	A small junior coaster themed as the Wild West and was built by Diego Cavazza. The ride was originally located at Spanish City under the name of "Bo-Bo" and relocated to Funland after the park's closure. The ride was scrapped after the 2016 season.
The Sam FM Drop	2005	2016	A 100 ft drop tower that was built by Intamin. It was formerly located at the London Trocadero as "The Pepsi Max Drop" and later "London's Scream Ride" before relocation. The Funland version operated differently to the Trocadero version, only having one car instead of two and was situated to a specially built large steel tower as the original ride sat on a wall. After 2016, it stood SBNO until it was dismantled at the start of the 2018 season and relocated to Luna Park Sunny Beach in Bulgaria following costly repair issues.
Helter Skelter	unknown	2016	A tall helter-skelter ride built by Supercar. It was replaced with another model, with this one being sold to an independent operator.
Klondike Gold Mine	2005	2015	A Pinfari ZL42 Roller Coaster originally located in Drayton Manor. It was removed in 2015 after being sold to an Irish company and renamed to Speed Loop, after being stripped of its theming. It operated at an Irish park for the 2017 season before being sold to a US operator in 2019.
Toy Town Express	Unknown	2014	A track ride where a train of cars goes along a small circuit with a bridge. It was replaced by Jurassic Safari in 2015.
Break Dance	2003	2013	A standard Breakdance ride. It first operated at the unrelated Funland arcade in the London Trocadero as one of several new additions to the venue in 2001, being sold to Funland Hayling Island once the Trocadero arcade reduced in size. It was relocated in 2014 to Luna Park Sunny Beach in Bulgaria.
Speed Flip	2011	2012	An Orbitor ride built by Moser Rides. After its removal, the ride was exported to Romania.
Whirlycopter	2008	2012	A Helicopter themed wheel ride built by Modern Products that previously operated at Drayton Manor. It was exported to South Africa after its removal.
Tornado 2	2007	2010	An upgraded version of the Tornado Frisbee ride. After the 2010 season, it was sold to an independent operator.
Cadbury's Junior Pirate Ship	2008	2008	A Junior Pirate Ship that previously operated at Drayton Manor. It is currently located at a park in Ireland.
Galleon	2004	2008	A large pirate ship built by Zamperla that was originally located at Adventure Island Southend and Fort Regent. The ride was sold to the Ocean Beach Pleasure Park in 2009, where it remains to this day.
Tornado	2003	2006	A KMG Frisbee Afterburner Ride. It was replaced with Tornado 2 for the 2007 season, and this ride was sold to Norwegian-based company Hugo's Tivoli, as a traveling ride, before being exported back to the United Kingdom in 2022, situated at Barry Island Leisure Park for 2022 before moving back to the south at the nearby Clarence Pier for 2023, under ownership of a British operator.
Zyclone	1988	2004	A Roller Coaster that is very similar to Skyways at Clarence Pier nearby. It was relocated to the Tir Prince Fun Park in 2005 before being exported to Bulgaria's Fun Park Sunny Beach in 2015.
Viking	2000	2003	Pirate Ship built by Zierer. The ride previously operated at many British funfair-based parks, including Funcoast World, Coney Beach, Pleasureland Southport and Ludewigt in Germany. Funland was the last park where the ride operated before it was scrapped following the 2003 season, and was replaced with a larger model.
Skydiver	1995	2002	Paratrooper ride built by Harry Steer Engineering. The ride previously operated at Brean Leisure Park before being relocated to Funland. It was sold to Dutch operators in 2003.
Twist	1984	2002	Scrambler ride built by Eli Bridge Company. It previously operated as another amusement park alongside origination in the United States. It was sold on to independent operators in 2003, and since 2013 has sat on the funfair at the Billing Aquadrome holiday park.
Sky Lab	1998	2000	Enterprise ride built by J. Bakker Denies which previously operated at Adventure Island. It was later sold to an independent operator before being scrapped following a period in storage.
Big Wheel	1986	1999	The park's third and last Big Wheel ride, built by Sartori. It previously operated at Peter Pan's Playground before relocating here. It was scrapped after being removed from Funland.
Ski Jump	1997	1997	Flying Coaster built by Cadoxton Engineering. It was relocated from Coney Beach and sat at Funland for the 1997 season. It was later sold onto independent operators before being scrapped in 2008.
Waltzer	1973	1996	The park's second Waltzer ride, which was built by George Maxwell & Sons. It was relocated to another theme park in 1997 before being sold on to Irish operators, where the ride has since sat on many Irish amusement parks.
Space Shuttle NASA	1983	1992	Standard Jets ride.
Ghost Train	1965	1990	A traditional ghost train (Dark Ride).
Wild Mouse	1980	1988	This steel hybrid wild mouse coaster was originally operated at Clarence Pier in Portsmouth. At the end of the 1988 season, It was removed from the park, It was sold to David Pickstone to use the spare tracks for his Wild Mouse at Brean Leisure Park.
Gallopers	1952	1986	Standard Gallopers ride which replaced another set and was built by Allchin & Linnell. It was removed from the park in 1986 and exported to the USA.
Big Wheel	1983	1985	The park's second Ferris Wheel, built by Eli-Bridge.
Helter-Skelter	1986	1985	The park's first slide, which was built by Supercar Leisure. The ride was relocated to Adventure Island in 1986, where it has since operated to this day.
UFO	1984	1984	A Typhoon ride built by Robles Bouso that sat on the park grounds for the 1984 season. The ride was scrapped in the 1990s.
Waltzer	1968	1972	Standard Waltzer ride built by George Maxwell & Sons. It was previously a traveling ride owned by a family, and after leaving Funland found new homes in two other amusement parks before being destroyed in a fire in 1986. Another Waltzer took its place at the park.
Peter Pan Railway	1953	unknown	Tracked train ride built by Lang Wheels. It is unknown when it closed or what happened afterwards.
Gallopers	1946	1951	Standard Gallopers ride which was replaced with another set.
Big Wheel	1946	1970's	The park's very first Big Wheel ride, built by Lusse. It was replaced with another set a few years later.

== Incidents ==
On 17 September 2015, a 47-year-old Romanian workman fell 23 metres from the Kondlike Gold Mine ride, as he was taking the coaster down for its sell-out to Euroshow, breaking his arm and leg in the process.
