= Gold Rush (Drayton Manor) =

Steel roller coaster at Drayton Manor Resort

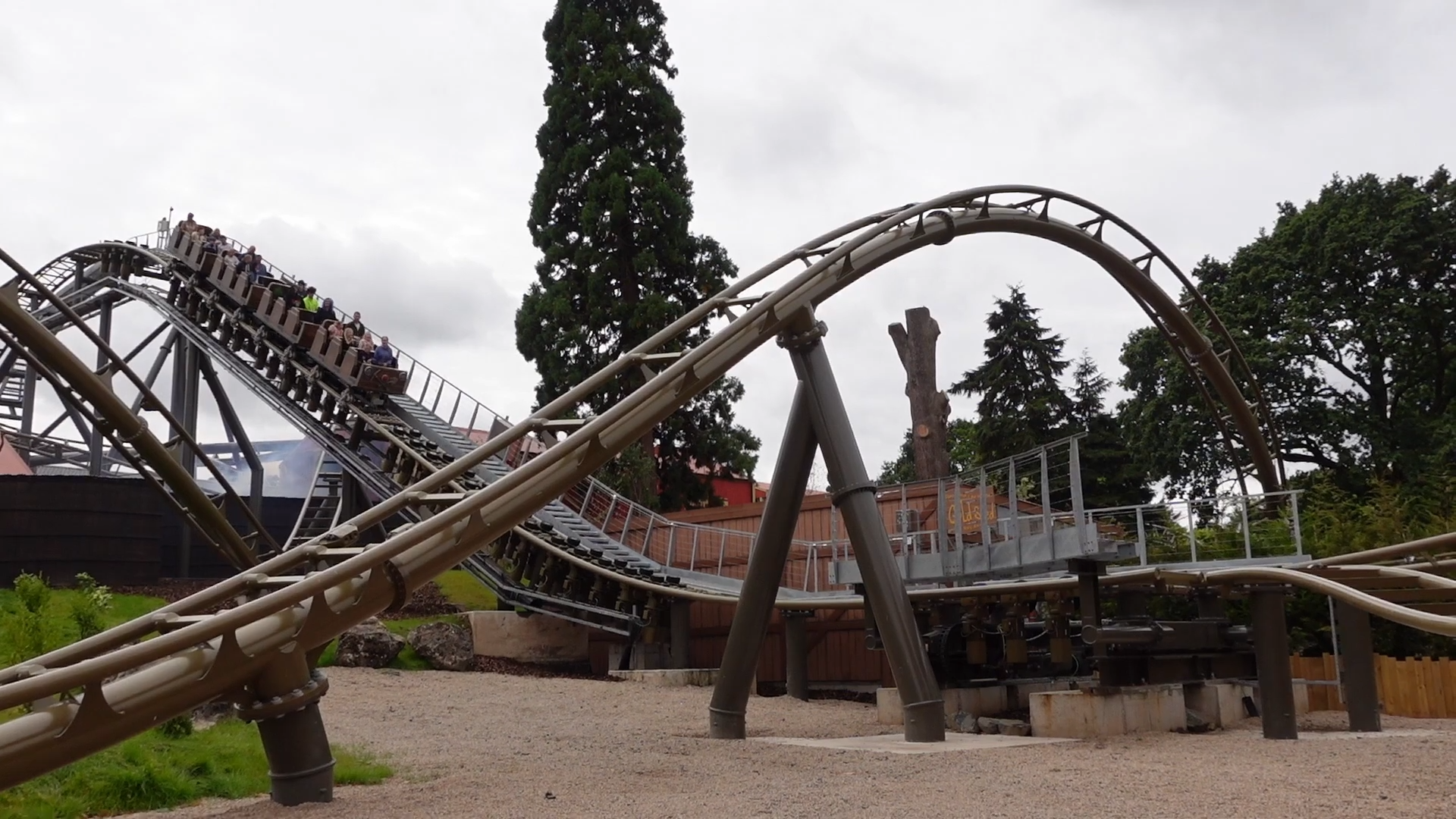
- A train on the backwards lift hill element

Drayton Manor Resort
- Location: Drayton Manor Resort
- Park section: Frontier Falls
- Coordinates: 52.610723°N 1.713831°W
- Status: Operating
- Opening date: 26 July 2024; 21 months ago
- Replaced: Apocalypse; Pandemonium; Big Wheel

General statistics
- Type: Steel – Family
- Manufacturer: Intamin
- Model: Lift & Launch
- Lift/launch system: Drive tire lift hill and launch
- Height: 56 ft (17 m)
- Speed: 37.3 mph (60.0 km/h)
- Duration: 2:00
- Height restriction: 100 cm (3 ft 3 in)
- Trains: 2 trains with 4 cars. Riders are arranged 2 across in 3 rows for a total of 24 riders per train.
- Physical Length: 1,945 feet (593 m)
- Total length Traversed: 2,650 feet (810 m)
- Website: Official website
- Fast Pass (Platinum only) available
- Gold Rush at RCDB

Gold Rush is a steel family roller coaster located at Drayton Manor Resort in Staffordshire, England. Manufactured by Intamin, the attraction opened as the centerpiece of the multimillion-pound Frontier Falls themed land. The coaster uses a track-switching system that allows for two distinct layout sequences.

== History ==
Drayton Manor Resort was bought out from administration by European theme park operator Looping Group in August 2020, with the Bryan family – the park's longtime owners – staying on in key management roles. Tasked with revitalizing the park, Looping Group shifted its focus towards families; over the following years, new themed areas and attractions were brought in while some thrill rides were phased out. Consequently, Pandemonium, an inverted swing ride, and Apocalypse, a 54-metre (177 ft) drop tower, were respectively retired at the end of the 2021 and 2022 seasons. Both attractions were removed to allow for future development; Looping Group CEO Laurent Bruloy first publicly referred to a "very big project for 2024" as early as March 2022.

Managing director Victoria Lynn hinted at a new "family thrill roller coaster" to take its place in January 2023. Drayton Manor Resort officially announced on 13 July 2023 that Liechtenstein-based ride manufacturer Intamin would provide a "Lift and Launch" roller coaster for the 2024 season. The park began constructing foundations for the coaster in September 2023, with ride hardware also beginning to show up at this time. RCS GmbH handled the installation of track and supports, lasting through January and February 2024. Trains subsequently arrived on site in February before being placed on the track.

To accommodate the new coaster, Drayton Manor refreshed the surrounding Wild West area into Frontier Falls, officially opening it on 24 March with the transformed Blasting Barrels ride and Falls Theatre. Drayton Manor later announced Gold Rush as the attraction's name on 3 July, subsequently opening it to the public on 26 July 2024.

== Ride experience ==
=== Queue ===
The entrance to the attraction begins with a themed tunnel decorated with signage for various fictional merchants, leading guests toward a switchback queue system located near the launch shed. The queue path then traverses the interior of the ride area before reaching the elevated station, which is accessed via three flights of stairs. The surrounding environment features several historical references to the park's heritage, including a decorative element originally used on the 1994 roller coaster Shockwave and a symbolic tombstone commemorating the former Apocalypse drop tower.

=== Sequences ===
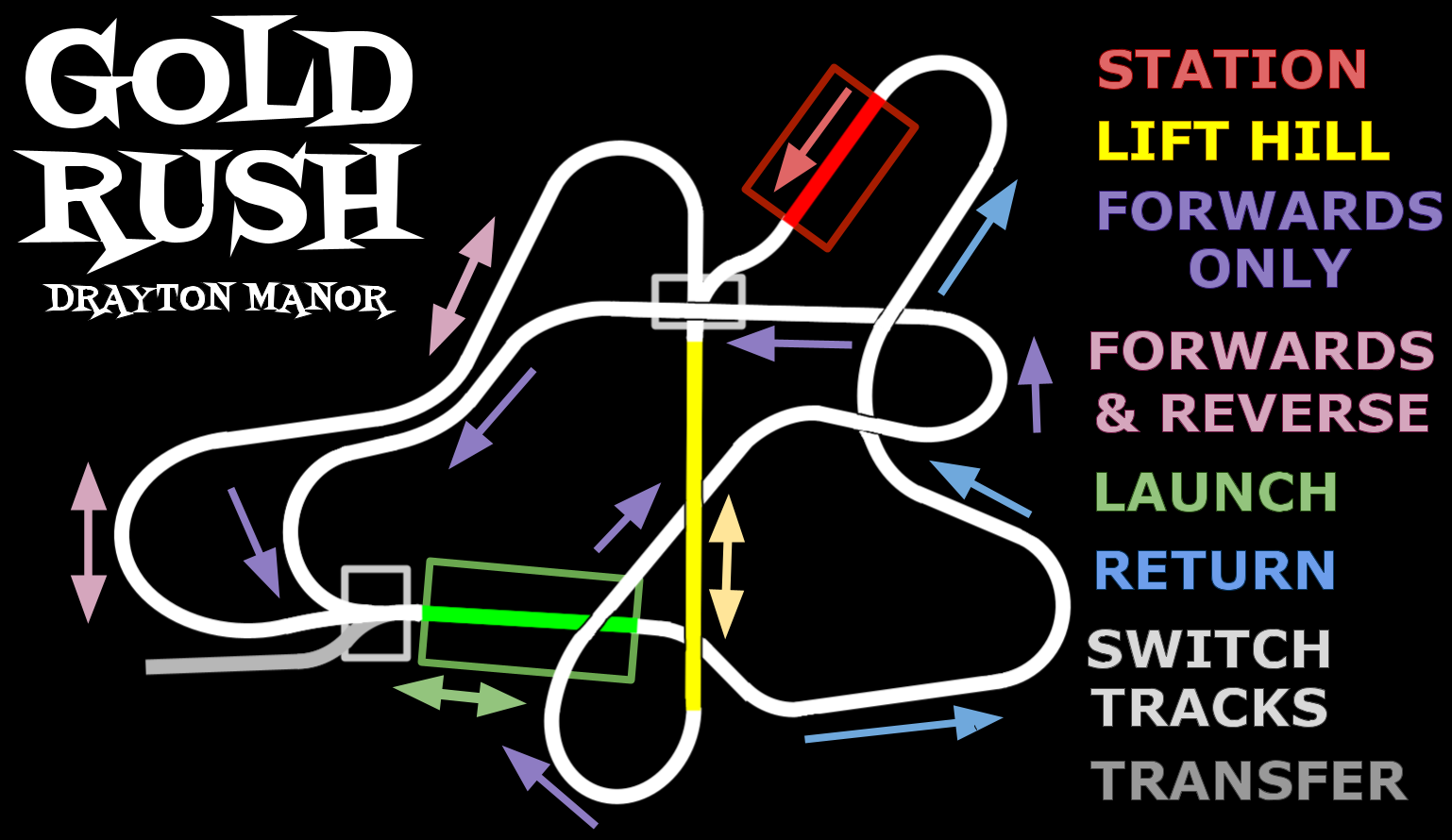
A top-down diagram of Gold Rush's layout and elements

Gold Rush uses track switches to allow the coaster to traverse two different layout configurations. This allows the park to vary the ride experience, for example, opting for one sequence in the morning and the other later in the day.

==== Experience 1 ====
1. Train leaves station and travels forward over the lift towards gravity run.
2. After show/stop, train is launched backward towards lift.
3. Train travels up the lift backward, before going over the top, train gets released and boosted slightly to re-run the gravity run previously done backward, this time forward.
1. When arriving to the show building, train is launched forward without stopping.
2. Train finish the gravity run forward towards block brake and back to station.

==== Experience 2 ====
1. Train leaves station and travels forward up the lift.
2. Before going over the lift, train gets released and slightly boosted backward towards the show building.
3. After show/stop, train is launched forward to re-run the gravity run previously done backward, this time forward towards lift.
4. Train goes over the lift forward, towards gravity run.
5. When arriving to the show building, train is launched forward without stopping.
6. Train finish the gravity run forward towards block brake and back to station.

== Characteristics ==
Gold Rush has a physical track length of 1,945 feet (593 m), a maximum height of 56 feet (17 m), and a top speed of 37.3 mph (60.0 km/h). Due to the coaster's ability to traverse a section of track twice, approximately 2,650 feet (810 m) is travelled during the ride. Gold Rush operates with two six-car trains, each car of which seat four riders in two rows of two for a total occupancy of 24 passengers. The vehicles utilise Intamin's individual lap bar restraint system which allows for a minimum height requirement of 1 metre (39 in).
