= Ben 10 (disambiguation) =

Ben 10 is an American media franchise. It may refer to various releases in that franchise:

== Television series ==
- Ben 10 (2005 TV series), a television series from 2005 to 2008
- Ben 10: Alien Force, a television series from 2008 to 2010
- Ben 10: Ultimate Alien, a television series from 2010 to 2012
- Ben 10: Omniverse, a television series from 2012 to 2014
- Ben 10 (2016 TV series), a reboot of the 2005 Cartoon Network series

== Other media ==
- Ben 10: Secret of the Omnitrix, a 2007 film
- Ben 10: Race Against Time, a 2007 film
- Ben 10: Alien Swarm, a 2009 film
- Ben 10/Generator Rex: Heroes United, a 2011 crossover special
- Ben 10: Destroy All Aliens, a 2012 film
- "Ben 10", a song by Onefour

== Other uses ==
- Accelerator (roller coaster) formerly known as Ben 10 – Ultimate Mission, a roller coaster at Drayton Manor Theme Park
