= George Bryan (British businessman) =

British businessperson

George Bryan OBE
- Born: George Herbert Hamilton Bryan; 9 April 1921; Kegworth, Leicestershire, UK
- Died: 20 September 2013 (aged 92); Tamworth, Staffordshire, UK
- Occupation: Businessman
- Years active: Unknown
- Known for: Founder of Drayton Manor Theme Park
- Spouse: Vera Bryan (1942–2013; his death)
- Children: Colin Bryan; Andrew Bryan; Jane Bryan

George Herbert Hamilton Bryan OBE (9 April 1921 – 20 September 2013) was a British businessman who was the managing director of the then Drayton Manor Theme Park. He founded the company with his wife Vera, in 1949.

== Career highlights ==
=== Entertainment Industry ===
George Bryan worked alongside his father, William Bryan, a decorated First World War pilot, to help reestablish his amusement park, after it had been closed down for the war. His father was one of the country's biggest inventors and manufacturers of mechanical coin-operated amusement machines. These included "Nudist Colony" (or the "Live Peep Show"). Mr Bryan was determined to establish a business of his own, and set about purchasing land with his wife Vera, to form their own attraction.

=== Drayton Manor Theme Park ===
George Bryan bought the 80-acre site near Tamworth, Staffordshire for £12,000 in 1949 and opened Drayton Manor Theme Park the year after. The site was the residue of the former ancestral estate of the Victorian prime minister Sir Robert Peel. Peel and his family were declared bankrupt in 1911, with most of the house pulled down soon after. During the Second World War the estate was used as a storage depot by the Army, which left behind a sea of brambles and mounds of rubbish. Mr Bryan, his wife and a small team set about rejuvenating the site, and six months later the park was ready. When the theme park opened in 1950, it had one restaurant, a tea room, three hand-operated rides, and a set of second hand dodgem cars.

== Personal life ==
George Bryan was born on 9 April 1921 at Kegworth, Leicestershire, where his father ran a slot machine business, and was involved in the creation of the famous Peephole machine. He went on to study engineering at Loughborough University, where his studies were interrupted by the outbreak of war. He volunteered for the Army, serving in the Warwickshires, and then the Royal Army Ordnance, before joining the Royal Engineers. He spent several years in the Egyptian desert repairing tanks and armoured cars within the Royal Army Ordnance.

While based at Arborfield in Buckinghamshire in 1942, Bryan met his future wife, Vera Cartlidge. When they married in December that year, during one of George's vacation leaves, they served up tinned ham and potatoes to their wedding guests and enjoyed a three-night honeymoon at the Bonnington Hotel in London, the highlight of which was a trip to the cinema to see James Cagney in Yankee Doodle Dandy.

After demob, he helped his father-in-law to get his amusement park, which had been closed for the duration of the war, up and running again, but after two years decided to branch out on his own.

A generous philanthropist who supported many local causes, George Bryan was appointed OBE in 2004. He is survived by his wife and by their daughter and two sons – one of whom, Colin, is managing director of the family business.
