= Vera Bryan =

British businessperson

- Born: Vera Florence Alice Bryan; 9 June 1917; Finchampstead, Berkshire, UK
- Died: 16 October 2013 (aged 96); Sutton Coldfield, Birmingham, UK
- Occupation: Businessperson
- Spouse: George Bryan (1942–2013; his death)
- Children: Colin Bryan; Andrew Bryan; Jane Bryan

Vera Florence Alice Bryan (9 June 1917 – 16 October 2013) was a British businessperson who was the co-founder and a director of the then Drayton Manor Theme Park. She co-founded the company with her husband George, in 1949.

== Career ==
After leaving school at the age of 14, Mrs Bryan began working at California-in-England Pleasure Park in Berkshire, which was owned by her father, and by 1935, Vera had taken over the running of the tea shop with all the responsibilities that role involved.

However, following the outbreak of the Second World War, California-in-England was shut and the restaurant was converted into a factory manufacturing aircraft parts. Bryan spent five years working at the factory.

In May 1942 she met her husband, George Bryan and they married in December that year.

=== Drayton Manor Theme Park ===
The couple first arrived at the 80-acre site near Tamworth on 16 October 1949, and the land was covered with four-foot high brambles, and old army huts that surrounded the former mansion of Victorian prime minister Sir Robert Peel. Six months needed to be spent to transform the site. In April 1950, Drayton Manor Park opened.

In addition to the running of Drayton Manor Theme Park, Vera Bryan also supported various charities, including the Royal National Lifeboat Institution (RNLI). In 2004, she named the new Drayton Manor lifeboat, which was purchased following fundraising activities by the park.

== Personal life ==
Vera Bryan married George Bryan in 1942 and first arrived at the Drayton Manor site on 16 October 1949. Vera died at the age of 96 on 16 October 2013, less than a month after the passing of her husband of 71 years.
