= Pirate Adventure (attraction) =

Dark ride

Drayton Manor Resort
- Status: Closed
- Opening date: 1990
- Closing date: 2015

Ride statistics
- Attraction type: Dark ride
- Manufacturer: Mack Rides
- Designer: Golding Leisure Design International
- Theme: Pirates
- Height: 3 m (9.8 ft)
- Length: 250 m (820 ft)
- Vehicle type: Endless transit system
- Vehicles: 12
- Riders per vehicle: 16
- Duration: 7 minutes

Pirate Adventure was a water dark ride opened in 1990 at Drayton Manor Resort in Staffordshire, England. It took riders by boat through a series of large animated scenes featuring pirates. The ride transit system was manufactured by Mack Rides. The attraction closed at the end of 2015 and the building remains closed to the public.

== History ==
Pirate Adventure was produced by Golding Leisure Design and the boat transit system was manufactured by Mack Rides in Germany, altogether costing a reported £3M and taking four years to develop. The building interior occupied 3,600 m^{2} and was largely filled with water, through which the boats travelled via an underwater track. The ride featured large animated scenes, including over 90 animated figures. It was similar in style to Disney's Pirates of the Caribbean. The attraction opened in July 1990 with an opening ceremony hosted by Timmy Mallett.

The ride eventually closed at the end of the 2015 season for undisclosed reasons. The building has since remained closed to the public, with a number of props sold off at auction in 2020.
