= G Force (roller coaster) =

Amusement ride at Drayton Manor Resort, England

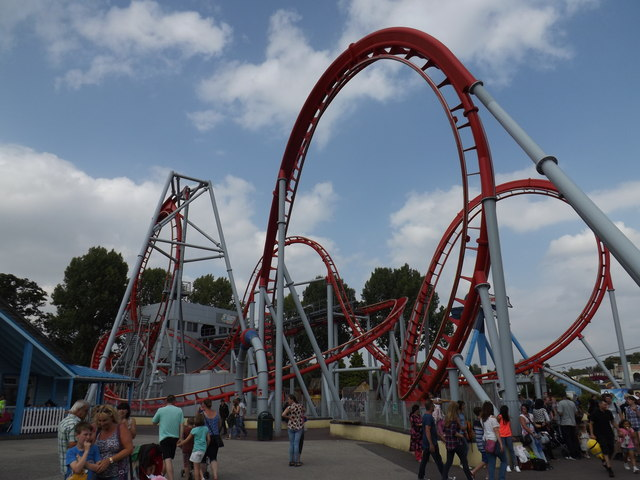

Drayton Manor Resort
- Location: Drayton Manor Resort
- Coordinates: 52°36′46″N 1°42′53″W
- Status: Removed
- Opening date: 26 July 2005
- Closing date: October 2018
- Cost: £2,500,000

General statistics
- Manufacturer: Maurer AG
- Model: HBX 2000
- Height: 82 ft (25 m)
- Length: 1,263 ft (385 m)
- Speed: 43.5 mph (70.0 km/h)
- Inversions: 3
- Duration: 0:45
- Max vertical angle: 360°
- Capacity: 1100 riders per hour
- G-force: 4.3
- Height restriction: 53–78.74 in (135–200 cm)
- Trains: 2 trains with 2 cars. Riders are arranged 2 across in 3 rows for a total of 12 riders per train.
- G Force at RCDB

G Force was a roller coaster at Drayton Manor Resort, Tamworth, England. It was the only X-Car coaster in the UK and was opened by the band G4 in 2005. The ride was also the third X-Car coaster to be built in the world, the first being the prototype Sky Wheel at Skyline Park in Germany and the second being X Coaster at Magic Springs. G Force featured an inverted lift hill whereat the top of the lift, riders are suspended upside down and the train is released. The coaster featured two more inversions: an immelman loop and a bent Cuban eight. The ride was originally called Project X but changed to G Force before the coaster's opening. The coaster closed in October 2018 after extensive downtime during the 2018 season. The park stated the maintenance cost for the coaster was too expensive and therefore the decision was to close the ride. As of January 2020, the ride had been removed and was in storage at the rear of the park. It is now in storage in the Netherlands.

== Ride experience ==
This ride lasted 45 seconds and reached a top speed of 70.0 kilometres per hour (43.5 mph). The train consisted of two cars, each seating three rows of two people.

The queue line featured projectors and screens as well as an original soundtrack.

== Incidents ==
An incident occurred on 10 October 2010 when the ride failed to gain enough height to join the lift hill after the station. Passengers were on the ride at the time, however, none were injured. The ride was then closed for a safety inspection. On 1 July 2017, a train stopped upside-down at the top of an inversion; no passengers were injured.

== Closure ==
On 12 October 2018, it was announced at a press conference that the coaster would be retired. The ride had been down for most of the 2018 season after the trains were sent off for modifications. The park stated that the ride had become too expensive to maintain and had excessive downtime. The ride was standing but not operating for the 2019 season with the only work on its removal being banners put up saying "Planning for future fun". By the end of January 2020, the ride had been removed.

The track, supports, trains and related equipment were then removed from the park and sent to the Netherlands where they have sat in storage. As of March 2024, the roller coaster is for sale at a Swiss amusement rides broker for a price of €695,000.
