= Stormforce 10 =

Theme park ride to recreate a lifeboat rescue

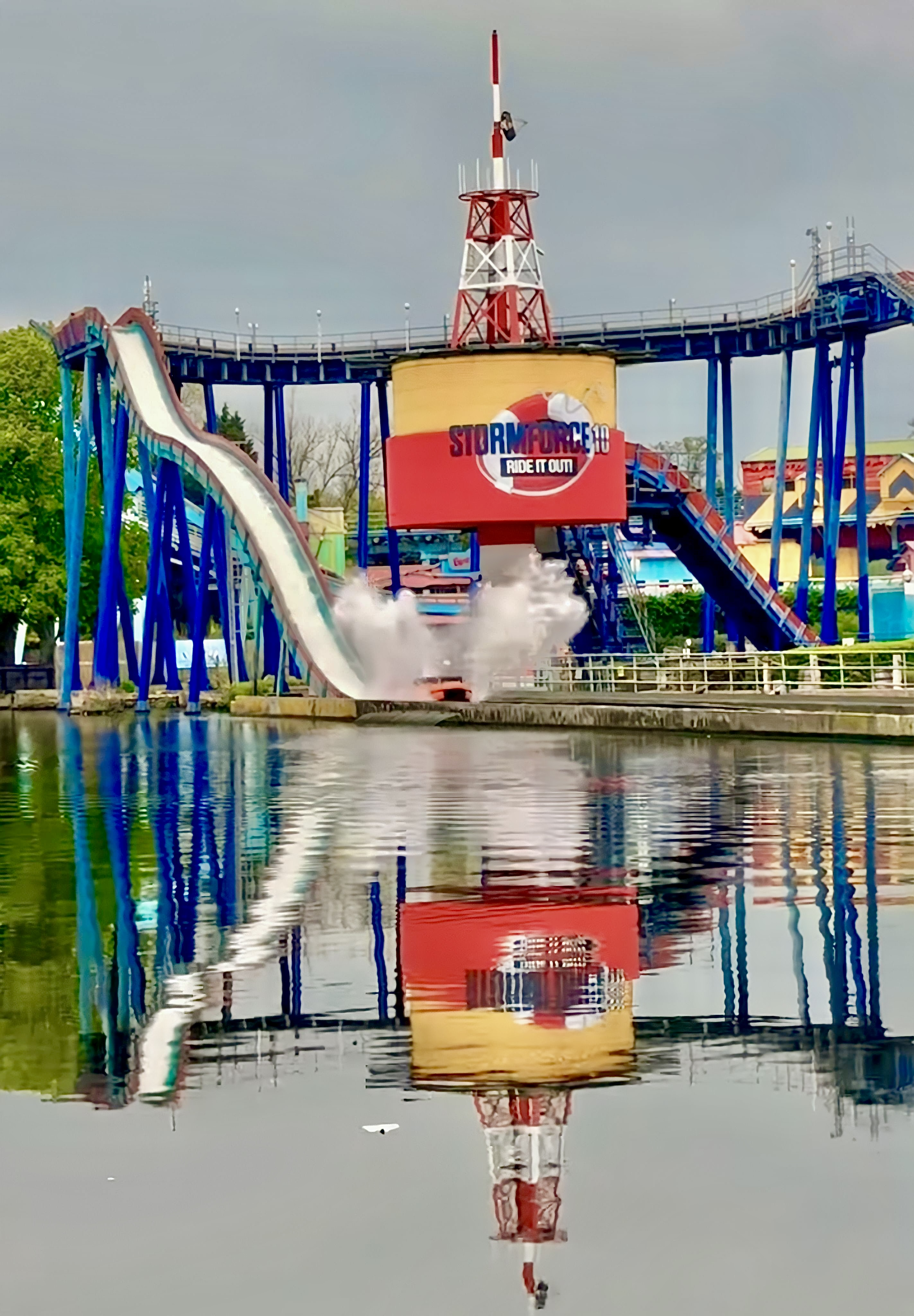

Drayton Manor Resort
- Area: Adventure Cove
- Status: Operating
- Cost: £3,000,000
- Opening date: 29 April 1999
- Replaced: Log Flume

General statistics
- Type: Grand Flume
- Manufacturer: BEAR GmbH
- Designer: Farmer Studios
- Lift system: Three conveyer lift hills
- Height: 54 ft (16 m)
- Length: 1,700 m (5,600 ft)
- Speed: 65 km/h (40 mph)
- Duration: 7 minutes
- Restraint style: Grabrails
- Height restriction: 130 cm (4 ft 3 in)
- Virtual queue: Fast Pass available

Stormforce 10 is a flume water ride located at Drayton Manor Resort near Tamworth, Staffordshire, England. Opened in 1999, the attraction was developed in association with the Royal National Lifeboat Institution (RNLI) to simulate the experience of a lifeboat rescue mission during a severe storm. For safety, a minimum height of 1.3m is required, and guests must be at least 14 years old to ride without adult supervision.

== History ==
Following a safety review after the Splash Canyon incident in 2017, Drayton Manor implemented several enhanced security measures for Stormforce 10. These include the installation of additional CCTV cameras, an upgraded PA system, and the introduction of mandatory age and increased height restrictions. To ensure strict adherence to safety protocols, a staff member is now permanently stationed at the base of the second lift hill to monitor rider behavior and prohibit the use of recording equipment.

== Ride experience ==
The Stormforce 10 experience begins as the ride vehicle enters a specialised launch area where a canopy seals behind the boat to simulate a lifeboat station. Historically, an animatronic lifeguard positioned to the left would signal the start of the mission by shining a torch and shouting, "Hold on tight now! Here ya go!" before a lever mechanism tilted the boat and released it into an initial 10-foot drop. After navigating a waterfall-style turn and ascending a 9-meter lift hill, the boat reaches a turntable that rotates the craft for a signature backwards descent, a segment notorious for drenching passengers. A second turntable then realigns the boat forward, leading through a themed tunnel and up a final 60-foot lift hill. From this summit, riders are provided with a panoramic view of the park before plunging down a final double-drop into the lake, a manoeuvre that generates significant airtime and a large splashdown before the boat returns to the station.
