= Al-Shallal Theme Park =

Amusement park in Jeddah, Saudi Arabia

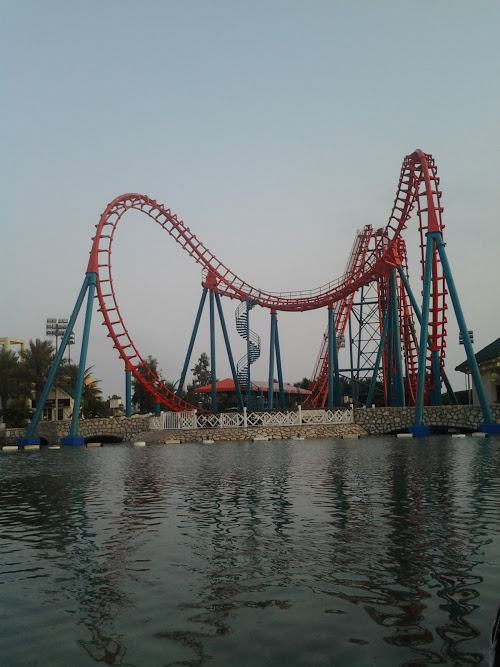
- Interactive map of Al-Shallal Theme Park
- Location: Ash Shati, Jeddah, Saudi Arabia
- Coordinates: 21.5676572°N 39.1114354°E
- Opened: November 25, 2004
- Owner: Sheikh Abdul Rahman Fakieh
- Operated by: Tarfeeh Fakieh Group
- Operating season: Open all year
- Area: 60,000 squares

Attractions
- Total: 16
- Roller coasters: 2
- Water rides: 1
- Website: Official website

Al-Shallal Theme Park is located in Jeddah, Saudi Arabia. The park is owned by Tarfeeh Fakieh Group. The park officially opened on November 25, 2004. In 2001, Tarfeeh fakieh Group ranked as the 34th largest company in Saudi Arabia with over $480 million in assets and over 6000 employees.

== History ==
The theme park officially opened on November 25, 2004. The theme park in Jeddah is one of a few popular amusement parks in the Middle East to have hundreds of families who visit the city for vacations. The two story entertainment building at the center of the Park features an ice skating rink and a themed area which is a favorite haunt of the younger visitors. The park reflects a jungle complete with life-size figures of animals, and light and sound effects. The Amazon log flume ride is spread over an area of 1800 square meters and consists of a lagoon with a 15-meter high waterfall. The entertainment building has several party rooms and an arcade. The party rooms can be reserved by the public for birthday parties and private gatherings. There are seven restaurants housed in the entertainment building. The park has retail outlets that feature souvenirs and soft toys. Apart from the Amazon Theme area there is a European village themed area and the Far East village area. These have world class restaurants that serve a wide array of seafood. The park also has a building for indoor parking which can accommodate 300 cars while there is an open air parking facility which has a capacity of 300 cars as well.

Al Shallal Theme Park is spread over an area of 60,000 square meters, in an ideal location on Jeddah Cornish. Per year Al Shallal receives around 1 Million visitors. Al Shallal went into a major transformation over the past few years, with the aim to becoming “The best Amusement Park in KSA.”

== Rides ==
=== Roller coasters ===
Name	Opened	Manufacturer	Make/model	Notes
Roller Coaster	2005	Vekoma	Boomerang	Previously called Krachen
Wild Mouse	2019	Zamperla	Spinning	

=== Attractions ===
Name	Manufacturer	Make/model	Opened	Notes
Amazon	BEAR	Flume	2005	
Bumper Cars	C&S	Dodgems	2005	
Crazy Submarine	Zamperla	Junior Flying Carpet	2005	
Flying Carousel	Zamperla	Swing ride	2005	
Merry-Go-Round	Zamperla	Carousel	2005	
Pirate	Zamperla	Pirate Ship	2005	
Power Surge	Zamperla	Power Surge	2005	
Samba Tower	Zamperla	Balloon Tower	2005	
Sling Shot	Funtime	Slingshot	Unknown	
Sombrero	Zamperla	Polyp	2005	
Super Shot	A.R.M. (USA) & Larson International	Drop Tower	2011	
Tea Cups	Zamperla	Teacups	2005	
Telecombat	Zamperla	Jets	2005	
Tour De-Paris	Zamperla	Junior Track Ride	2005	
