= Apocalypse (Drayton Manor) =

Former Drop Tower at Drayton Manor Theme Park

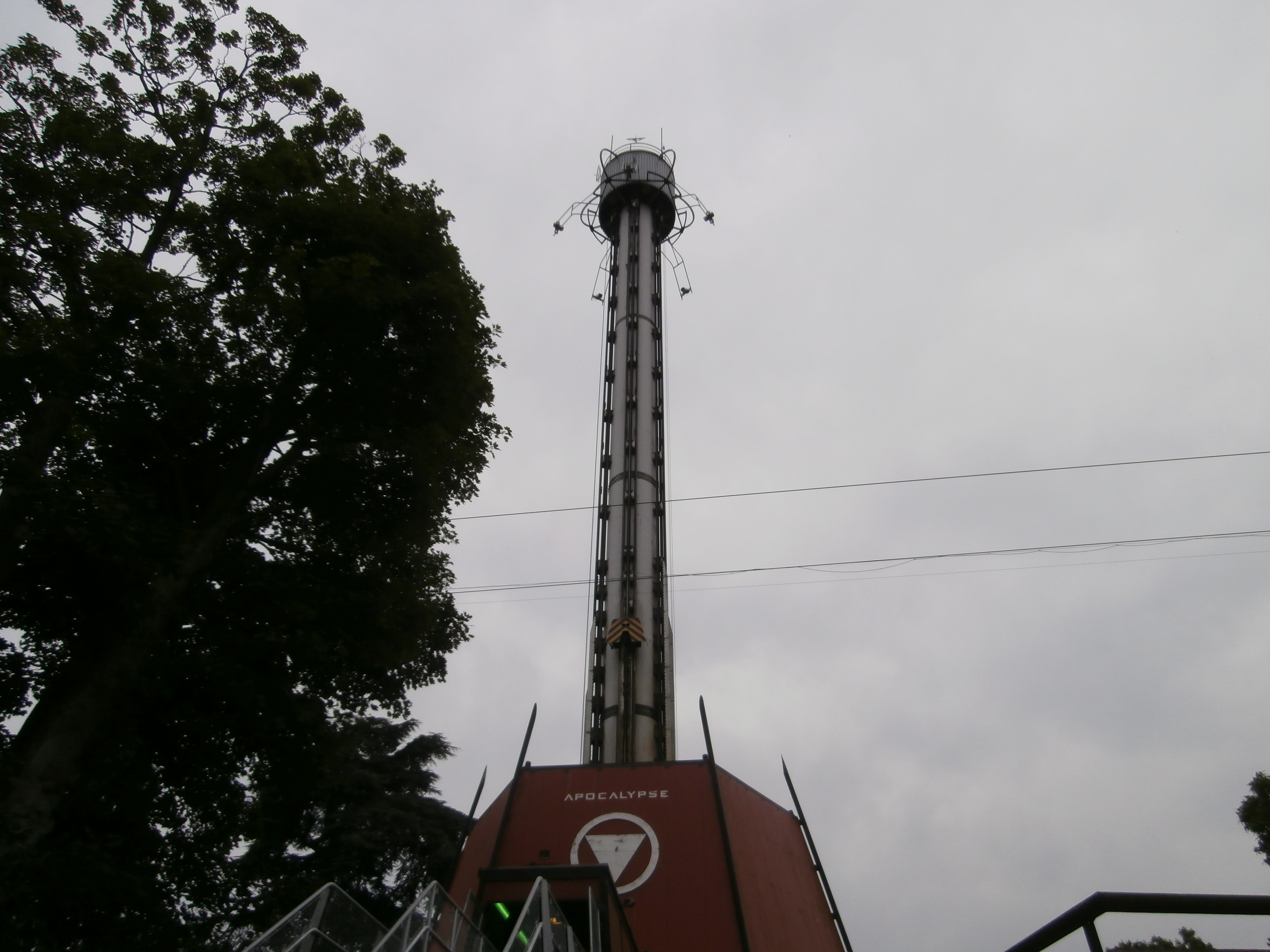
- Apocalypse tower

Drayton Manor Resort
- Area: Aerial Park
- Status: Removed
- Cost: £2,000,000
- Opening date: 27 May 2000; 26 years ago
- Closing date: 30 October 2022; 3 years ago
- Replaced by: Gold Rush

Ride statistics
- Attraction type: Drop tower
- Manufacturer: Intamin
- Designer: Space Leisure
- Model: Giant Drop
- Theme: Industrial/Hazardous
- Height: 177 ft (54 m)
- Speed: 50 mph (80 km/h)
- G-force: 4
- Capacity: 520 riders per hour
- Vehicle type: Gondola
- Vehicles: 5
- Riders per vehicle: 4
- Duration: 1:15
- Height restriction: 120 cm (3 ft 11 in)

Apocalypse was a 54-meter-high (177 ft) drop tower attraction that operated at Drayton Manor Resort in Staffordshire, England, from 27 May 2000 until its permanent closure on 30 October 2022. Manufactured by Intamin, the ride was the first of its kind in the world to offer multiple riding positions, including sitting, standing, and floorless-standing configurations.

== History ==
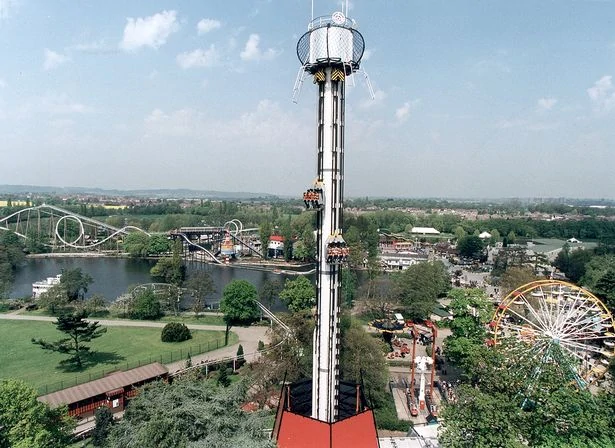
The original tower 2000-2001

Opening in April 2000, Apocalypse originally featured four drop towers with distinct riding configurations: Towers 1 and 2 offered a traditional sit-down experience, while Towers 3 and 4 utilised a stand-up design. In 2002, the attraction underwent a significant expansion to incorporate a fifth tower, which introduced the world's first stand-up floorless drop element, marketed at the time as "The Fifth Element."

Throughout its later years of operation, the ride saw several technical and aesthetic updates. Following a period of closure for Tower 5 starting in 2016, the park removed the external queue line and the original entrance arch in 2018 to facilitate crane access for essential repairs. In 2019, the station underwent a comprehensive refurbishment that included the installation of modern control panels, new flooring, and the replacement of the original klaxons and beacons with a standardised siren system.

Standing at 54 meters, Apocalypse was the tallest attraction at Drayton Manor. Due to its significant elevation, it served as a local landmark, visible from outside the park boundaries and across various parts of the Wilnecote area in Tamworth.

Upon its debut, Apocalypse held the distinction of being the first stand-up tower drop in the world. It remained the only attraction of its kind for five years until the 2005 opening of Hurakan Condor at PortAventura Park in Spain.

In 2008 the ride received an Airtime Award from amusement park fansite CoasterForce.com, whose members voted it the "Best Thrill Ride in Europe".

Starting in 2019, the attraction experienced a phased reduction in capacity as individual towers were removed from service. By the 2022 season, only Tower 2 remained operational. Despite maintenance efforts to restore the full circuit, the rising costs of repairs and the significantly diminished throughput of a single tower led to the decision to retire the ride.

Apocalypse officially closed on 30 October 2022 to make way for future park developments. To mark its final day of operation, the resort's social media team organised a commemorative group photograph with enthusiasts at the ride's entrance, and limited-edition merchandise was produced to memorialise the attraction’s 22-year history.

== Incidents ==
Two days prior to the attraction's official launch in 2000, an industrial accident occurred involving an electrician performing night-time maintenance on the tower. The individual fell approximately 10 meters from the structure, resulting in a broken leg. The rescue operation and the details of the incident were later reconstructed for an episode of the BBC documentary series 999, which highlighted the technical challenges faced by emergency services when responding to accidents on high-altitude structures.
