= Drayton Manor =

Country house in Staffordshire, England

Coordinates: 52.609°N 1.713°W

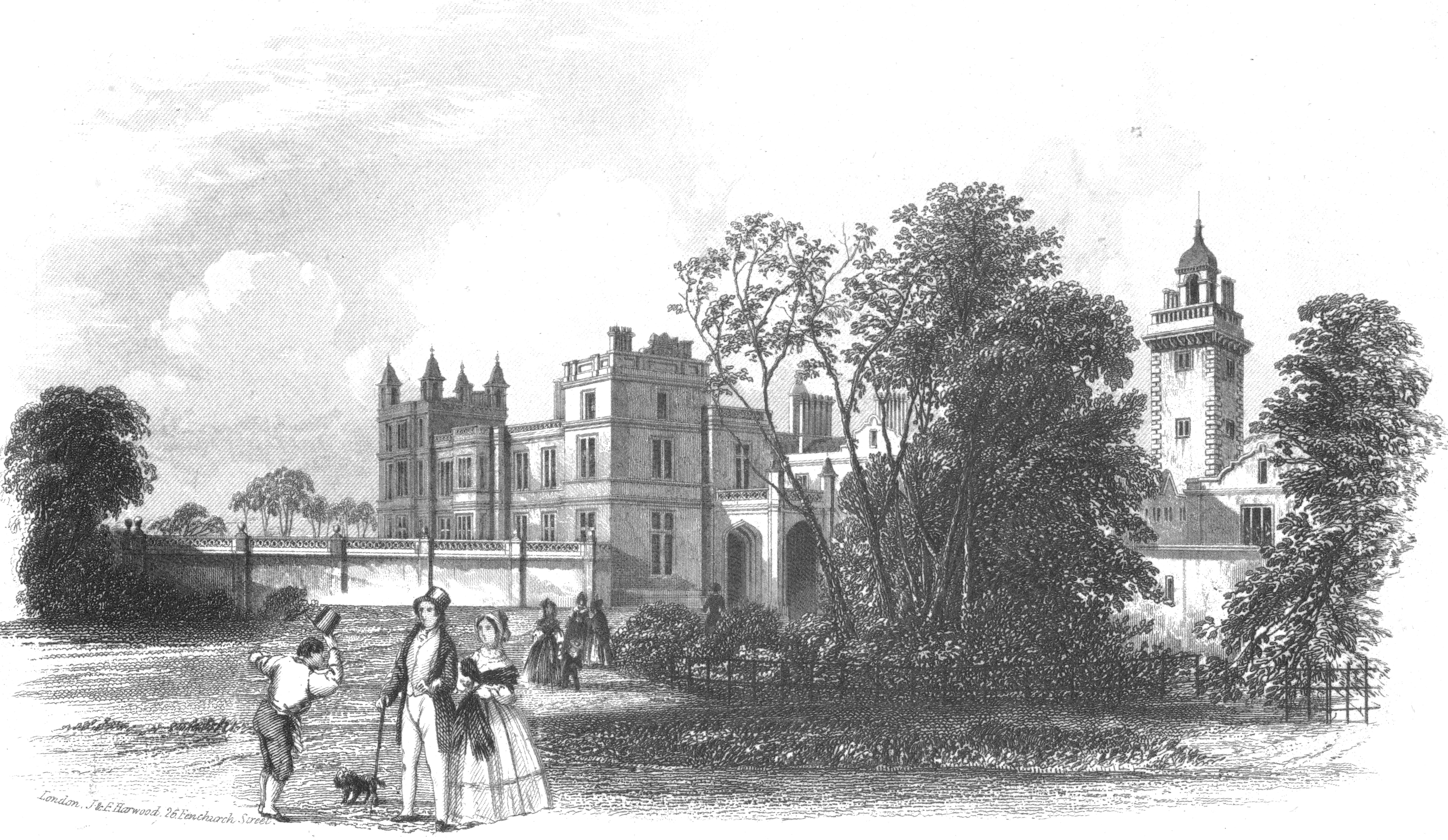
Drayton Manor in 1842

Drayton Manor, one of Britain's lost houses, was a British stately home at Drayton Bassett, since its formation in the District of Lichfield, Staffordshire, England. In modern administrative areas, it was first put into Tamworth Poor Law Union and similar Rural Sanitary District, 1894 to 1934 saw its inclusion in Tamworth Rural District, and in the next forty years it lay in the Lichfield Rural District (which was abolished in 1974).

== History ==
The manor was owned from the time of the Norman conquest by the Bassett family until in the 13th century. The male line failed and Margaret Bassett, heiress to the estate, married Edmund Lord Stafford. The estate remained in the ownership of the Earl of Stafford until the attainder and execution of the Duke of Buckingham (the 7th Earl) in 1483, when it passed to the Crown. Thereafter several owners included the Earl of Leicester and, from about 1600, the Earl of Essex. The latter's descendants sold the estate in about 1790 to Robert Peel (1750–1830) a Lancashire textile manufacturer, who was Member of Parliament for Tamworth 1790–1820. Following his death in 1830, his son Robert Peel (1788–1850), who followed his father into the Tamworth seat and later became Prime Minister, demolished the old manor house and its three storey banqueting house, and replaced it with a grand mansion (incorporating a three storey tower) designed in the Elizabethan style by architect Robert Smirke.

In 1843 Drayton Manor received a royal visit from Queen Victoria and Prince Albert. In farms of the estate the first Tamworth pigs were bred, their place of market being Tamworth.

The house ceased to be the principal residence of the Peel family and in 1926 it was demolished. Only the clock tower now remains. The site was sold in 1949 to the Bryan family for the creation of leisure gardens which were later developed to become the Drayton Manor Resort. The nearest large town is Tamworth.

In 1946 greyhound racing was held at the Tamworth Greyhound Stadium built on the existing cricket ground. Also known as the Drayton Manor Deer Park Racing Track because it used to be the large deer park belonging to the manor. Speedway also took place from 1947 to 1950 and greyhound racing ceased in the early sixties after the site became housing in the area immediately above Bourne Brook (Dama Road today).
