= The Wave (Drayton Manor) =

Family Looping Roller coaster in Staffordshire, England

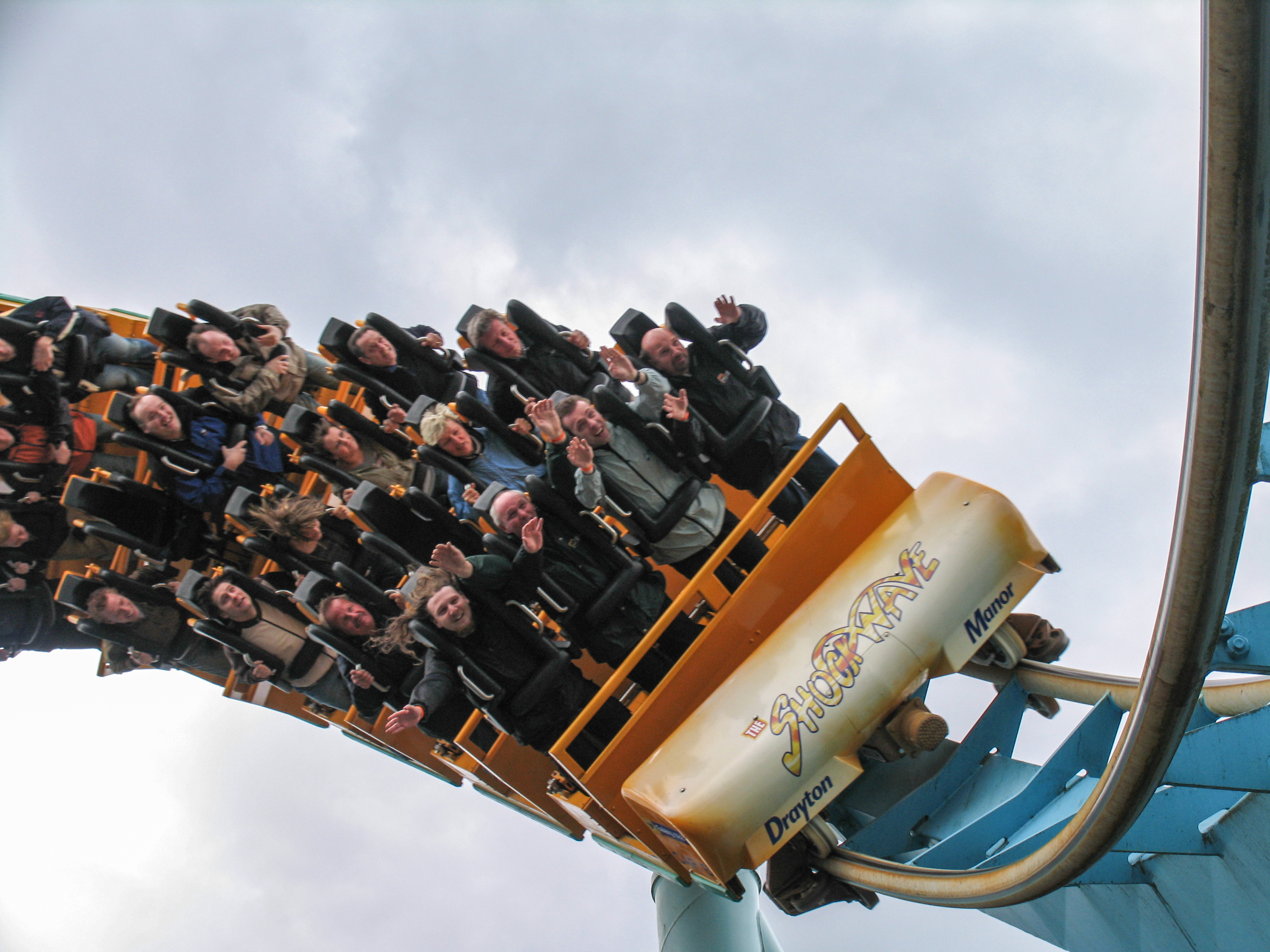
- Original stand-up trains

Drayton Manor Resort
- Location: Drayton Manor Resort
- Park section: Adventure Cove
- Coordinates: 52°36′45″N 1°42′58″W
- Status: Operating
- Opening date: 1994
- Cost: £4.2 million
- The Wave at Drayton Manor Resort at RCDB

General statistics
- Type: Steel
- Manufacturer: Intamin
- Designer: Werner Stengel
- Model: Sit-Down/Looping
- Lift/launch system: Chain lift hill
- Height: 120 ft (37 m)
- Drop: 105 ft (32 m)
- Length: 1,640.4 ft (500.0 m)
- Speed: 56 mph (90 km/h)
- Inversions: 4
- Duration: 1:40
- G-force: 4
- Height restriction: 120 cm (3 ft 11 in)
- Trains: Single train with 6 cars. Riders are arranged 4 across in a single row for a total of 24 riders per train.
- Fast Pass (Platinum only) & Easy Pass available

The Wave is a steel roller coaster located at Drayton Manor Resort in Tamworth, Staffordshire, United Kingdom. Manufactured by the Swiss firm Intamin, the attraction originally opened in 1994 as The 7up Shockwave (later shortened to Shockwave).

== History ==
2016 logo

The attraction opened in 1994 under the name The 7up Shockwave and was later known simply as Shockwave. During its original operation as a stand-up roller coaster, it was notable for being the only ride of its configuration in the world to feature a zero-g roll.

On 5 November 2023, the ride was retired in its stand-up form to undergo a significant conversion for the 2024 season. This refurbishment included the installation of new sit-down trains manufactured by ART Engineering. The attraction was rebranded as The Wave and the minimum height requirement was reduced from 1.4 metres to 1.2 metres. This change was implemented to lower the age demographic for the ride and increase its accessibility to younger guests while maintaining the original track layout and inversions..

== Ride Experience ==
Upon the train's dispatch from the station, kicker wheels propel the vehicle along a straight track segment toward the chain lift hill. The train performs a slight dip before ascending the 37-metre-tall (120 ft) lift. At the apex, the train executes a gradual descending left-hand turn, leading into the first inversion, a vertical loop.

Immediately following the loop, the train enters a zero-g roll. The layout then transitions into a slight leftward curve onto a straight section where the first of two on-ride photo cameras is positioned on the left side of the track. The course continues into a double left-hand corkscrew, representing the final two inversions of the circuit. Upon exiting the corkscrews, the train maneuvers a right-hand turn before a final straight track segment leads the train into the brake run, returning to the station.
