= Accelerator (roller coaster) =

Roller coaster at Drayton Manor Resort

- Previously known as Ben 10 – Ultimate Mission (2011–2016)

Drayton Manor Resort
- Location: Drayton Manor Resort
- Park section: Frontier Falls
- Coordinates: 52.610795°N 1.713390°W
- Status: Operating
- Opening date: 21 April 2011
- Cost: £2,100,000

General statistics
- Type: Steel – Shuttle
- Manufacturer: Vekoma
- Designer: Meticulous ltd
- Model: Family Boomerang
- Lift/launch system: Booster Wheel Lift Hill
- Height: 20 m (66 ft)
- Length: 180 m (590 ft)
- Speed: 60 km/h (37 mph)
- Inversions: 0
- Capacity: 750 riders per hour
- G-force: 3
- Height restriction: 100 cm (3 ft 3 in)
- Fast Pass & Easy Pass available
- Accelerator at RCDB

Accelerator (formerly Ben 10 - Ultimate Mission) is a steel shuttle roller coaster at Drayton Manor Resort.

== Description ==
The ride is a prototype steel Vekoma Family Boomerang roller coaster. The ride features one lift hill driven by wheels that release the train into a curving figure 8 layout that concludes up a tower with a hump. Upon reaching the top of the tower the coaster train goes through the layout in reverse to the station.

== History ==
- 2010 - Ride was officially announced by the park
- April 21, 2011 - Ride opened
- 2016 - Ride was renamed to Accelerator, after the sponsorship from Cartoon Network ended
- 2024 - Ride received a light retheme with the introduction of the new Frontier Falls area of the park.

== See also ==
- 2011 in amusement parks
