= Drayton Manor Resort =

Amusement park in Staffordshire, England

- Interactive map of Drayton Manor Resort
- Location: Drayton Bassett, Tamworth, Staffordshire, England.
- Coordinates: 52°36′39″N 1°42′48″W
- Status: Operating
- Opened: 1 May 1950; 76 years ago
- Owner: Looping Experiences
- Slogan: Epic Family Fun
- Operating season: Theme Park; Main season: March – November; Drayton's Magical Christmas: late November to December; February Half Term: selected days in February; Drayton Manor Zoo; Same Times As The Theme Park; Drayton Manor Hotel; Year-round; Conference Centre; Year-round
- Area: 180 acres (73 ha)

Attractions
- Total: 47 (as of 2026)
- Roller coasters: 5
- Water rides: 3
- Website: draytonmanor.co.uk

Drayton Manor Resort is a family theme park, zoo and accommodation in the grounds of the former Drayton Manor, in Drayton Bassett, Staffordshire, England, UK. It covers 180 acres (73 hectares), of which about 113 acres (46 hectares) are in use. It is the fourth-largest amusement park in the UK by land area at 280 acres (110 hectares). The park is also home to Thomas Land and Drayton Manor Zoo, home to over 100 animals, including red pandas, Eurasian lynx, and a variety of monkeys and gibbons.

On 3 August 2020, Drayton Manor Park was sold to Looping Experiences.

== History ==
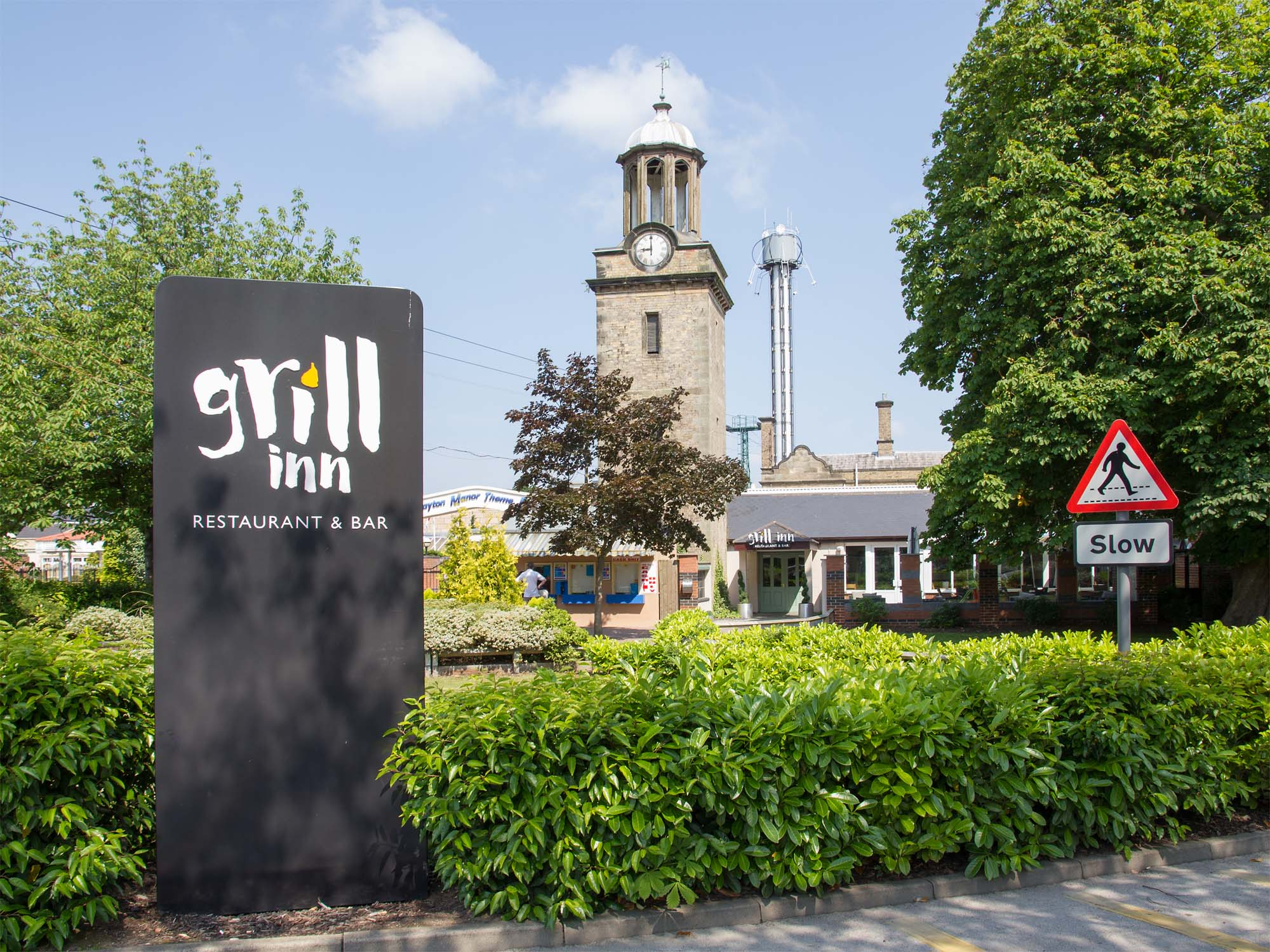
The clock tower of Drayton Manor house, the remaining part of the building

The land on which the theme park was built once belonged to the Peel family. Drayton Manor mansion, built for Sir Robert Peel, 2nd Baronet, in 1835, had been reduced to ruins by 1926, with only the clocktower surviving at the park entrance. The British Army requisitioned it as a training post during World War II. After the war, entrepreneurs George and Vera Bryan borrowed £6,000 and bought the land (and the 17 huts that the army had constructed during their stay). In 1950, they opened a small amusement park with just a handful of children's rides. In 1954, Mrs. Molly Badham, who later opened the nearby Twycross Zoo, partnered with the Bryans and opened a zoo to complement the amusement park. The amusement park grew slowly through to the 1970s.

From the 1980s, the park began to install larger custom attractions, including the Log Flume, Jungle Palladium animated show, Buffalo Coaster and Pirate Adventure dark ride. In 1992, Colin Bryan, George Bryan's son, became managing director of the park. In 1993–94, the park opened the Splash Canyon river rapids and Shockwave stand-up coaster.

On 9 May 2017, an 11-year-old girl riding the Splash Canyon Rapids fell into the water. The girl was airlifted to Birmingham Children's Hospital, but was proclaimed dead from drowning. The park was temporarily closed after the incident, and the ride remained closed until summer 2021.

In February 2020, the park suffered flood damage from Storm Dennis. Following this, the park was required to remain shut until July 2020.

On 3 August 2020, the park entered administration and was bought by the Looping Group who own various parks, zoos and aquariums around Europe such as Pleasurewood Hills and West Midlands Safari Park.

In December 2020, the park suffered a fire within the Thomas Land area of the park. The blaze started in a toilet block and was deemed accidental by investigators.

At the end of 2021, the park announced that something big was coming with the teaser Invading 2022 in a Nordic Viking style, hinting at the fact there was to be a new area in 2022 called Vikings. After a soft opening on 17 May, the intricately themed area officially opened on 28 May, featuring three new rides and the rethemed Buffalo roller coaster.

In 2022, the park renaming to 'Drayton Manor Resort' together with new branding.

In July 2023, it was announced that the park would be opening an Intamin family thrill Lift and Launch Coaster called Gold Rush which opened on 26 July 2024.

== Rides and attractions ==
Drayton Manor is split into various themed areas, consisting of rides and attractions.

Attraction key	Thrill rides	Family rides	Other

=== Adventure Cove ===
	Name	Opened	Manufacturer	Description
1	Air Race	2014	Zamperla	A Zamperla Air Race ride, themed around a seaside air show. The ride replicates the sensations of an acrobatic aeroplane flight, spinning 360 degrees upside down. The ride is 8 metres tall and features 24 seats. Air Race replaced Black Revolvers, with the minimum height to ride being 1.2 metres. Incorporated into Adventure Cove in 2021.
2	Maelstrom	2002	Intamin	An Intamin Gyro Swing ride, themed around a destructive maelstrom, featuring a circular gondola that rotates 360 degrees as it swings back and forth. The ride is 22.5 metres tall and features 32 outward-facing seats. The minimum height to ride is 1.3 metres. Maelstrom was incorporated into Adventure Cove for the 2021 season.
3	The Wave	1994 (2024)	Intamin	A steel sit down looping coaster that reaches speeds of up to 85 km/h with four inversions; a loop, a zero-g roll and a double corkscrew. The ride is 36 metres tall and seats 24 riders per train. The minimum height to ride is 1.2 metres. It was formerly a Stand-Up coaster known as Shockwave
4	Stormforce 10	1999	BEAR GmbH	A BEAR GmBH 500 metre long Flume ride, formerly sponsored by the RNLI. The ride is themed around a treacherous storm and features three drops including a 9-metre backwards drop. The minimum height to ride is 1.3 metres and anyone aged under the age of 14 must be accompanied by a responsible person aged 16 years or older. The ride underwent a major refit in 2017 and was repainted for 2021 in Adventure Cove.
5	River Rapids	1993 (2021)	Intamin	An Intamin 455 metre long River Rapids ride, formerly known as Splash Canyon from 1993 until 2017. Themed around a voyage through a cartoon-style fishing port past vibrant painted shacks. The minimum height to ride is 1.2 metres, and anyone under the age of 14 must be accompanied by a responsible person aged 16 or over. Following four seasons not operating, the ride reopened in 2021 featuring all new boats, effects and theming, becoming a key attraction in Adventure Cove.
6	Tidal Towers	2021	Outdoor Play UK	An Outdoor Play UK Climbing Frame attraction, themed to the ocean. Featuring highly detailed play towers, with rope bridges and exhilarating slides. The attraction is connected to the Chicken Hatch. Tidal Towers opened brand new in 2021, becoming a key attraction in Adventure Cove.
7	Wave Swinger	2021	Zierer	A Zierer Waveswinger ride, themed as a nautical adventure. The ride lifts up and swings round and round with a minimum height requirement of 1.0 metres with an adult and 1.2 metres alone. The attraction offers double and single seats with a full capacity of 40. The ride replaced G-Force and is a centre piece for the all new Adventure Cove.

=== Vikings ===
	Name	Opened	Manufacturer	Description
8	Thor	28 May 2022	Zamperla	A Zamperla Disk'o Coaster, themed around the Norse god, Thor. Riders sit in a motorcycle-like position in outward-facing seats at the edge of a circular ride platform, then spin back and forth over a camel hump. Thor marks the third installation of the model in the country, following The Edge and Kobra.
9	Jormungandr	1987 (28 May 2022)	Zamperla	A Zamperla Powered Coaster that goes over Drayton lake, themed around the sea serpent, Jörmungandr. The ride opened in 1987 as the Buffalo Coaster with white track and supports. In 2002, the ride was repainted to red and green. For the 2022 season, the ride was incorporated into the new Vikings area; it reopened with this new theme on 28 May 2022.
10	Loki	28 May 2022	Zamperla	A Zamperla Nebulaz attraction, themed around the trickster Norse god, Loki. Four arms swing about horizontal axes in a circular motion while the central tower rotates around itself, creating a hypnotic movement described as a 'visual riddle'. Loki is the first of its model in the country, making for a unique experience.
11	Sleipnir	28 May 2022	Metallbau Emmeln	A Metallbau Emmeln Pony Trek tracked ride, featuring rocking horse cars. Themed around Odin's eight legged horse, Sleipnir. The ride is very popular with children as it gives a realistic feeling of riding real animals. The model has been installed across the country, including George's Dinosaur Adventure at Paultons Park.

=== Frontier Falls ===
	Name	Opened	Manufacturer	Description
12	Gold Rush	26 July 2024	Intamin	An Intamin Lift and Launch model roller coaster, opening on 26 July 2024 as the flagship attraction of the new Western themed Frontier Falls area. Located on the former sites of the Apocalypse and Pandemonium attractions. Described as a family thrill ride, featuring numerous airtime hills.
13	Sheriff's Showdown	2000	I.E. Park	An indoor laser shoot-out ride with a Wild West theme. The minimum height requirement is 1 metre. It was previously known as "Golden Nuggets: Wild West Shootout" until it was refurbished in 2018, with a new gun system and new theming elements. Was incorporated into Frontier Falls for the 2024 season.
14	Blasting Barrels	2006	Intamin	Opening as Drunken Barrels, the teacup style ride spins riders on a circular platform that has an extending arm that lifts the platform up to 45 degrees. The minimum height requirement is 1.1 metres. Drunken Barrels replaced Cyclone a HUSS Enterprise that's now at Thorpe Park under the name 'Zodiac'. The ride was rethemed into Blasting Barrels and incorporated into Frontier Falls for 2024.
15	The Haunting	1996	Vekoma	A madhouse ride themed as an old and haunted vicarage. The minimum height requirement is 1.2 metres, if unaccompanied. The attraction had a minor refurbishment with a different story in 2016. The ride was incorporated into the Frontier Falls area with the original story returning for the 2024 season.
16	Falls Theatre	2009	Simworx	A theatre which shows a short film. Previously known as the 4D Cinema and the Drayton Theatre. Was incorporated into the Frontier Falls area for the 2024 season, screening the film 'Looney Tunes 4D starring Road Runner & Wile E. Coyote'.
17	Accelerator	2011	Vekoma	A junior boomerang roller coaster that reaches speeds of up to 62 km/h on a 180-metre-long track and reaches a height of 20 metres. The minimum height to ride is 1 metre and the rider must be over 4 years old. Riders below 1.2 metres must be accompanied by an adult. Formerly known as Ben 10: Ultimate Mission until 2017. Received a light retheme to fit into the Frontier Falls area in 2024.

=== Main Park ===
	Name	Opened	Manufacturer	Description
18	The Bounty	2007	Intamin	A swinging pirate ship that swings to an angle of 75 degrees. The minimum height to ride is 1.2 metres. The Bounty was the long-awaited replacement for the old Pirate Ship which closed in 2003 to make way for the new main park entrance
19	Carousel	1958	Savage	A vintage merry-go-round ride. The minimum height to ride alone is 1.1 metres.
20	Dodgems Ahoy	1990	I.E. Park	A dodgems ride with a pirate theme. The minimum height to ride is 1.2 metres if accompanied by an adult and 1.45 metres if unaccompanied by an adult. The ride underwent a refit in 2017.
21	Flying Dutchman	1983	Intamin	A wave swinger ride. The minimum height to ride is 1 metre. Speculated to be relocated into the Vikings themed area in the coming years.
22	Jolly Buccaneer	1992	Mack Rides	A spinning boat with a pirate theme. The minimum height requirement is 1.2 metres, if unaccompanied.
23	Polperro Express Train	1971 (2003)	Severn Lamb	A 2-foot long (610mm) narrow gauge train ride that goes around the park via the Adventure Cove River Rapids (was Splash Canyon) and Shockwave. The new Polperro Express locomotive (2003) is based on the Severn Lamb Texan model with a facelift to be a more English-style loco/train rather than classic western American.

=== Thomas Land ===
Area themed around Thomas & Friends.

	Name	Opened	Manufacturer	Description
24	Bertie Bus	15 March 2008	Zamperla	A crazy bus ride. In partnership with Arriva. Formerly known as ‘Crazy Bertie Bus.’
25	Blue Mountain Engines	May 2011	Zamperla	A junior regetta ride including Skarloey, Rheneas, Sir Handel and Peter Sam. Relocated in 2015 in the new Thomas Land expansion.
26	Captain's Sea Adventure	8 April 2015	Zamperla	A watermania ride.
27	Cranky’s Drop Tower	15 March 2008	Zamperla	An 8 metre high sky drop ride.
28	Diesel's Locomotive Mayhem	15 March 2008	Zamperla	A demolition derby ride featuring themed cars resembling Diesel, Mavis, Iron Bert, Salty, Dennis and Rusty. Formerly known as ‘Diesel’s Locomotion Mayhem.’
29	Discover Thomas & Friends Exhibition	July 2009	HiT Entertainment	An indoor miniature model railway exhibition with the original models from the first to twelve series of the TV series. Relocated in 2023 in the exit to Winston's Whistle-Stop Tour.
30	Emily's Adventure Play	15 March 2008	Unknown	An indoor soft play area.
31	Flynn's Fire Rescue	8 April 2015	Zamperla	A fire brigade ride. In partnership with West Midlands Fire Service.
32	Harold’s Helicopter Tours	15 March 2008	Zamperla	A samba tower ride. Features Tidmouth Sheds outside with Edward, Henry, Gordon, Toby, and Rosie. Formerly known as ‘Harold’s Heli Tours.’
33	James and the Red Balloon	1 April 2017	Zamperla	A samba balloon ride located at the back of the Thomas Land expansion area that opened in 2015.
34	Jeremy Jet’s Flying Academy	15 March 2008	Zamperla	An aero top jet ride. Relocated in 2015 in a new Thomas Land expansion. Formerly known as ‘Jeremy’s Flying Academy.’
35	Lady's Carousel	15 March 2008	Zamperla	A junior carousel ride.
36	Rocking Bulstrode	15 March 2008	Zamperla	A rocking tug ride.
37	Sodor Classic Cars	1972 (15 March 2008)	Supercar	A car ride. Originally known as simply the Classic Cars, and is the only attraction in Robinsons Land that was kept for Thomas Land. Formerly known as ‘Sodor’s Classic Cars.’
39	Terence’s Driving School	15 March 2008	SB International	A driving school ride. Relocated in 2011 to the Farmer McColl's Farm area. Relocated again in 2024 to the Main Thomas Land Area.
40	Thomas and Percy's Submarine Splash	29 April 2023	Soquet	A 455-metre-long mini flume ride.
41	Thomas, Rosie and Percy Engine Tours	15 March 2008	Metallbau Emmeln	A themed narrow-gauge train ride that takes you from the Thomas Land area to the zoo. Thomas and Percy were the original engines, with Rosie being added in May 2009. The Rosie locomotive was repainted from pink to red in 2019, in line with the TV series.
42	Toby's Tram Express	8 April 2015	Zamperla	A barnyard ride.
43	Troublesome Trucks Runaway Rollercoaster	15 March 2008	Gerstlauer	A junior roller coaster located in Thomas Land. The minimum height requirement is 1 metre with an adult and 1.2 metres if unaccompanied. Formerly known as ‘Troublesome Trucks Runaway Coaster.’
44	Winston's Whistle-Stop Tour	19 July 2013	Zamperla	An aerial monorail-style attraction with commentary taking you around Thomas Land.

=== Other attractions ===
	Name	Opened	Description
45	Dino Trail	2010	Walk-through prehistoric dinosaurs.
46	Crazy Golf		A 12-hole crazy golf course located near the main resort entrance, opposite the Hamilton Suite. Costs £2 a game.
47	HB Games		Selection of fairground games. Additional charge applies.

=== Past rides and attractions ===
Name	Opened	Closed	Description
Waltzer	1965	1979	A Waltzer ride, replaced by a newer model in 1980.
Roller Coaster	1964	1983	A small oval roller coaster, replaced by Super Dragon.
Jumbo Jet	1981	1983	A City Jet coaster, replaced by Python Looping Coaster and relocated to Nigloland.
Quasar	1985	1987	Sold to showman Michael Phillips in September 1987.
Dodgems	1952	1989	A dodgems attraction, replaced by a new version in 1990.
Mississippi Showboat	1988	1994	A showboat-themed fun house.
Snake Train	1950	1995	A land train, replaced by The Haunting.
Jungle Palladium	1985	1999	A comical Polynesian-themed animated show that ran for 17-minutes. Several features were later reused around the park.
Rowing Boats	1950	1997	Rowing boats on the main lake.
Paratower	1982	1997	A Parachute Tower, sold to Pleasure Island Family Theme Park.
Octopus	1984	1997	Polyp ride.
Cleo	1986	1997	Junior magic carpet.
Junior Combat Star	1986	1997	Junior Jets.
Kiddie Concorde Jets	1986	1997	Junior Jets.
Red Baron	1986	1997	Junior Jets.
Balloon Race	1987	1997	A Wave Swinger ride, where Maelstrom is now located.
Log Flume	1981	1998	A log flume ride, replaced by Stormforce 10. Sections were later used to lengthen Klondike Creek at Flamingo Land.
Haunted Crypt	1970	2001	A ghost train, later replaced by an indoor play area.
Jungle Cruise	1976	2001	A scenic boat ride around a lake featuring animated scenes. It was replaced by Excalibur.
Giant Slide	1985	2002	An Astroglide.
Pirate Ship	1982	2003	A swinging Pirate Ship, removed to make way for the new entrance complex.
Cine 180	1985	2003	A 180-degree cinema.
Sky Flyer	1989	2003	A Vekoma Skyflyer, replaced by Pandemonium in 2004.
Klondike Gold Mine (Python Coaster)	1984	2004	A Pinfari Zyklon ZL-42 roller coaster. It was replaced by G-Force and sold to Funland Hayling Island in 2005.
Tea Cups	1988	2004	A Tea Cups ride replaced by G-Force. Now located at Adventure Wonderland.
Cyclone	2003	2005	An Enterprise ride. It was replaced by the Drunken Barrels and relocated to Thorpe Park as Zodiac.
Super Dragon	1984	2007	A Pinfari MD31 coaster. It was replaced by Troublesome Trucks Runaway Rollercoaster and sold to Funland Hayling Island.
Cadbury's Junior Pirate Ship	1986	2007	Junior Pirate Ship. It was removed after the closure of the Robinsons Land area and sold to Funland Hayling Island.
Junior Carousel	1986	2007	A carousel, replaced by Lady's Carousel.
Ladybirds	1986	2007	A Modern Products Ladybird ride.
Lunar Carousel	1986	2007	A Carousel-type ride. It was removed after the closure of the Robinsons Land area and sold to Brean Leisure Park as "Looney Tunes".
Arriva Crazy Bus	1998	2007	Crazy Bus converted to Bertie Bus.
Flying Jumbos	1998	2007	An elephant themed Jets ride, replaced by Jeremy Jet's Flying Academy.
Frog Hopper	1998	2007	A small drop tower. It was replaced by Cranky Crane Drop Tower and sold to Funland Hayling Island.
Mini Balloons	1998	2007	Samba Balloons. It was removed after the closure of the Robinsons Land area and sold to Funland Hayling Island.
Pirate Raft Ride	1998	2007	Junior jet ride. It was removed after the closure of the Robinsons Land area and sold to Great Yarmouth Pleasure Beach.
Whirly Copter Wheel	1998	2007	A Junior Ferris Wheel. It was replaced by Harold's Helicopter Tours and sold to Funland Hayling Island.
Jolly Roger	2004	2007	A Rockin Tug ride. Now operating at Alton Towers Resort as "Heave Ho".
Black Revolver	1980	2010	An enclosed waltzer. It was replaced by Air Race and now operates at Rainbow Park, Hunstanton.
Sombrero	1998	2010	A Polyp ride, replaced by Accelerator.
Excalibur	2003	2012	A comical Medieval-themed tow boat ride around a lake, featuring animated scenes.
Pirate Adventure	1990	2015	A large pirate-themed water dark ride.
Drayton Queen	1992	2016	A paddleboat around the lake.
Chair Lift	1964	2017	The chair lift offered a view from the entrance to the back of the park.
Big Wheel	1986	2017	A ferris Wheel. Later sold to Billing Aquadrome outside Northampton.
G Force	2005	2018	The world's first X-Car steel rollercoaster. It was replaced by a new outdoor play area called Tidal Towers and a Wave Swinger.
VertiGo	2016	2019	A high ropes adventure course.
Pandemonium	2004	2021	A 360° swinging inverter ride, later replaced by Gold Rush.
Apocalypse	2000	2022	A 54m stand-up and sit-down drop tower ride and the world's first stand-up drop tower. It was replaced by Gold Rush.
Spencer's Outdoor Adventure Play	2008	2026	An outdoor adventure play area, formerly known as Spencer’s Activity Park.

== Zoo ==
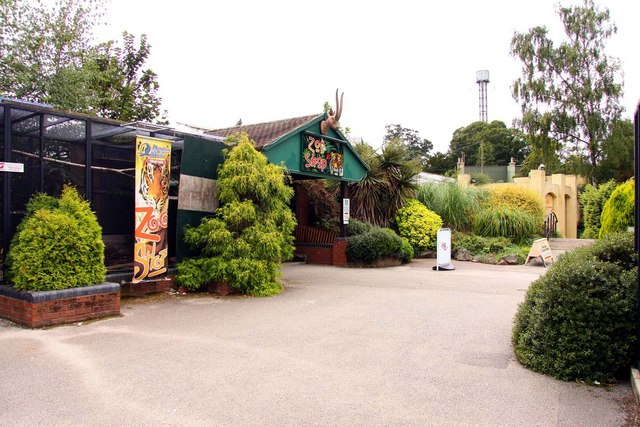
Zoo area

Drayton Manor is also home to a 15-acre (6 ha) zoo. It contains over 100 animals from all over the world.

== Events ==
Drayton Manor offer a range of family-friendly events throughout the season.

=== Halloween at Drayton ===
==== Pumpkin Smash Bash ====
Open 10:30 am – 5 pm daily, this event is tailored towards the park's younger visitors. The signature attraction is 'The Castle of Spooks' which offers a 15-minute experience where guests get to meet Halloween characters and take part in spooky activities including scary stories, interactive games, and trick or treating. The park's signature area Thomas Land is dressed with creepy decorations, pumpkins and spooky entertainment.

==== The Haunted Manor ====
Advertised as the 'Ultimate Halloween Event', this event runs on selected dates throughout October, from 5–9:00 pm. Aimed at the park's older visitors, on top of the scare attractions, guests get to experience night rides, live DJ, characters and fireworks. The event was named 'Night at the Manor' in its first year.

The Haunted Manor Scare Attractions
Year	Attractions (number of seasons)					
2022	Castle of Screams (1)	The Haunted Express (2)	Hunt for Zebadiah (1)			
2023	Castle of Shadows (1)	The Haunted Express (2)		Chaos Cove (1)	The Haunting: Reclaimed (1)	Vikings: Ragnarok (1)

– Previous Haunted Manor attraction. – Current Haunted Manor attraction.

== Accommodation ==
=== Drayton Manor Hotel ===
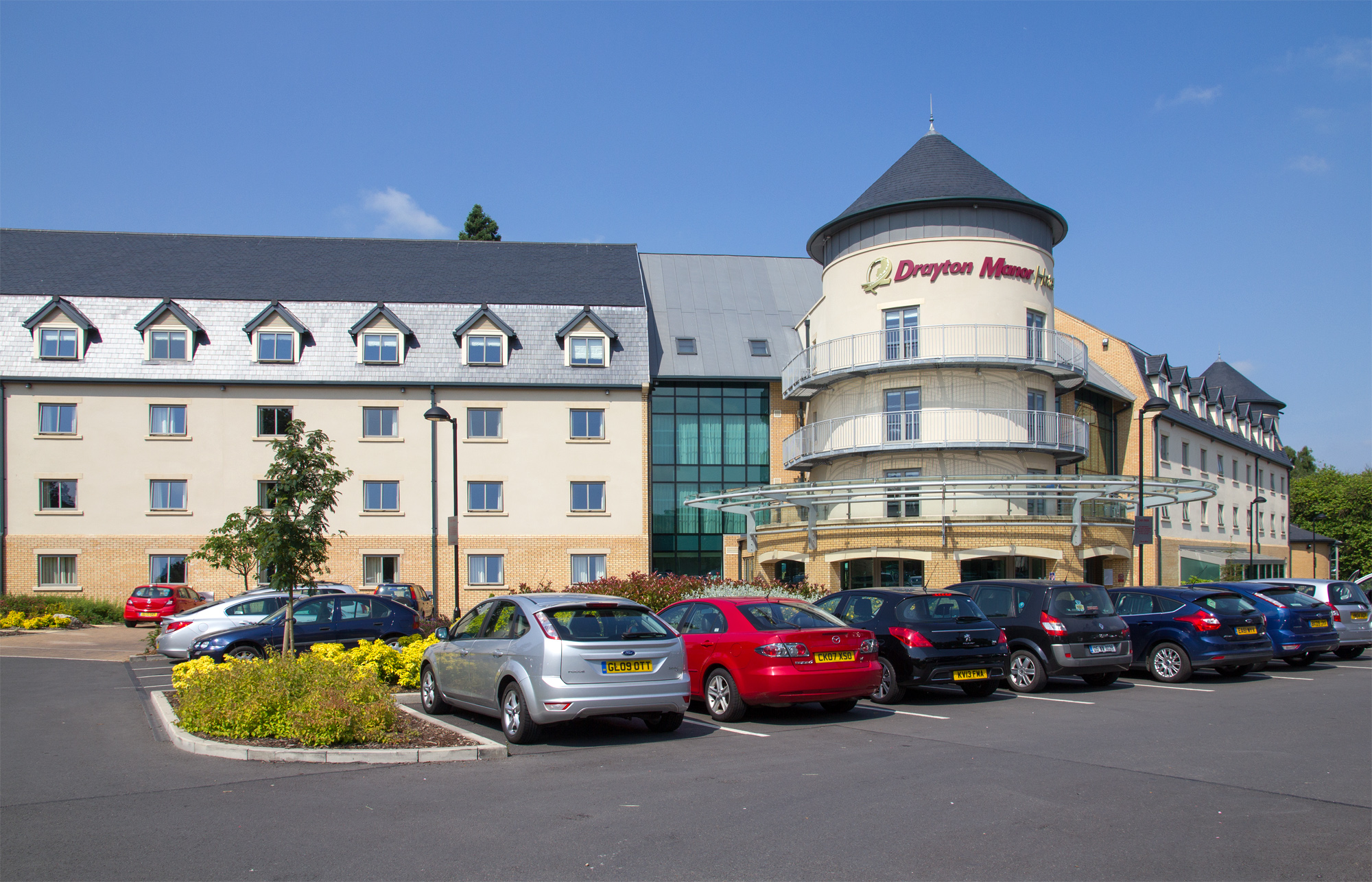
Hotel building

In 2009, plans for a hotel at Drayton Manor were submitted to Lichfield District Council. Planning permission for the hotel was granted in 2007, though the applicants felt that the scheme could benefit from further improvements without increasing the site area required.

The 4-star hotel with 150 guest rooms including 15 Thomas & Friends themed bedrooms is designed to primarily meet the demand from park visitors as the park is attracting families from all over the UK, especially since the arrival of Thomas Land.

=== Camping and Caravanning Club ===
The Camping and Caravanning Club have a site at Drayton Manor. On the site there are 90 pitches, glamping tents (available through Ready Camp) and a children's playground.
