= Frank Hrubetz & Company =

Defunct amusement ride manufacturer

Frank Hrubetz & Co., Inc. was an American manufacturer of amusement park flat rides. Established in 1939, the company was located near the Salem, Oregon airport. It sold both trailer-mounted and permanent model rides to theme parks throughout the world. Models included the Meteor, Paratrooper, Round Up, and Tip Top. In 1968, the company's estimated business brought in over $1.5 million and its plant space was 25,000 square feet. By the early 1970s, Hrubetz was selling 60 rides each year, making it the second largest manufacturer of amusement rides in the United States. They closed their manufacturing doors in 1992.

== History ==
The company was founded by Frank Hrubetz, a 1930 graduate of Oregon State College with a degree in mechanical engineering. Hrubetz worked for the Eyerly Aircraft Company which developed a 10-foot airplane on a fixed base for training pilots. Called the Orientator, it used a small electric propeller and could climb, dive and turn. The company discovered it was more profitable as entertainment after one buyer placed the trainer on the corner of Hollywood and Vine in Los Angeles as an amusement ride. While working for Lee Eyerly, Hrubetz helped develop other rides including the Loop-O-Plane and later Roll-O-Plane—two small bullet-shaped cars that spun rapidly on a vertical axis. In 1939, Hrubetz left Eyerly to become a competitive manufacturer with Frank Hrubetz & Co.

== Flat rides ==
- Paratrooper—Ten double-seat gondolas spinning on a hanging arm.
- Round Up—Oval-shaped cages rotating on an angled platform
- Meteor—3 oval-shaped cages rotating on an angled platform
- Hi-Ball—Tower with a gondola that raised to the top and spun
- Screwball—Only one ever built and never sold to the public. No images ever taken. Very little is known about this ride... Capell Brother's Shows owned one in late 1950s.-early 1960s.
- Spitfire
- Tip Top - Ten 2-person spinning tubs on a rotating platform
- Fireball

== Gallery ==
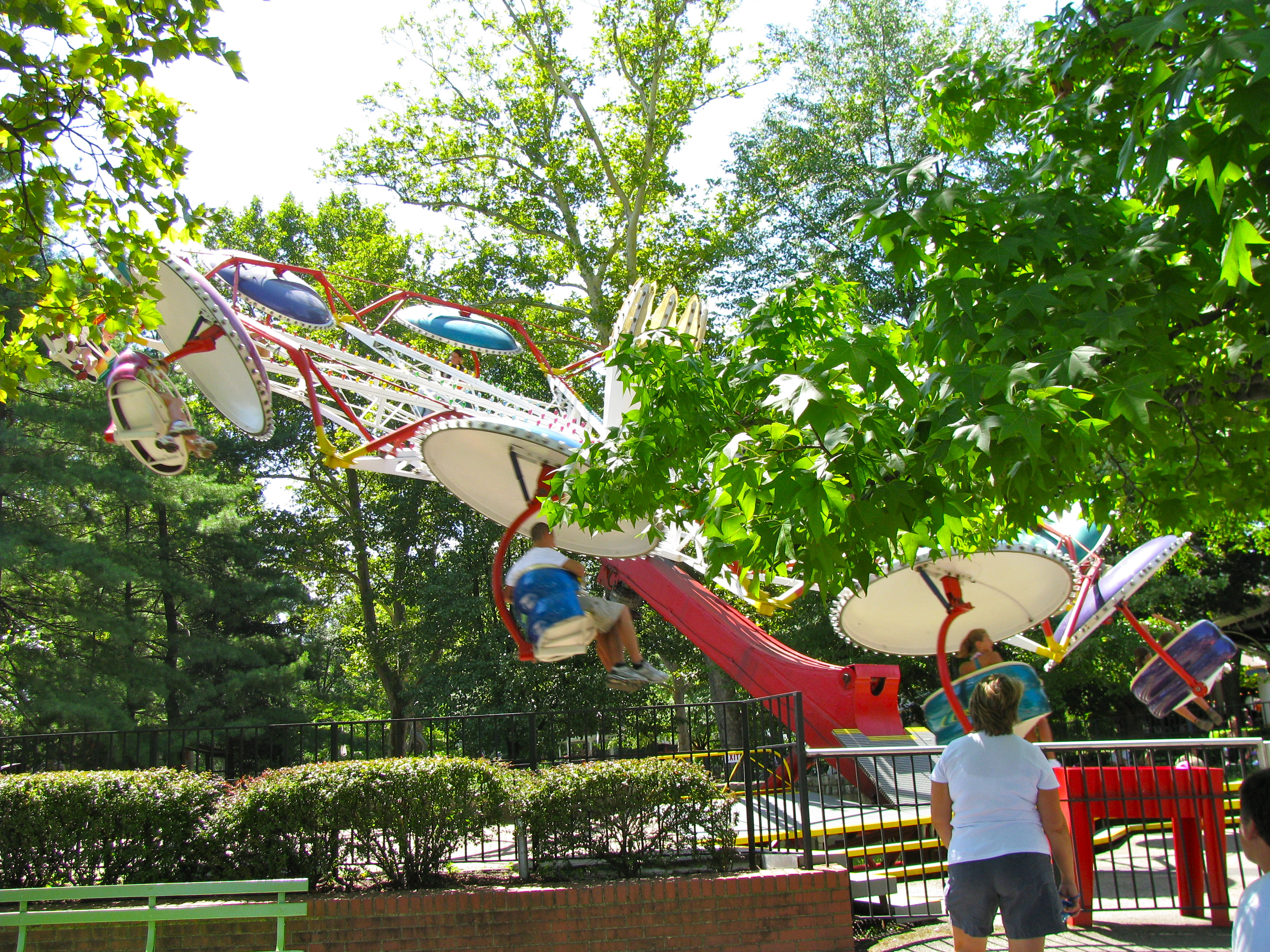
Paratrooper by Frank Hrubetz & Co., permanent installation at Kennywood Park

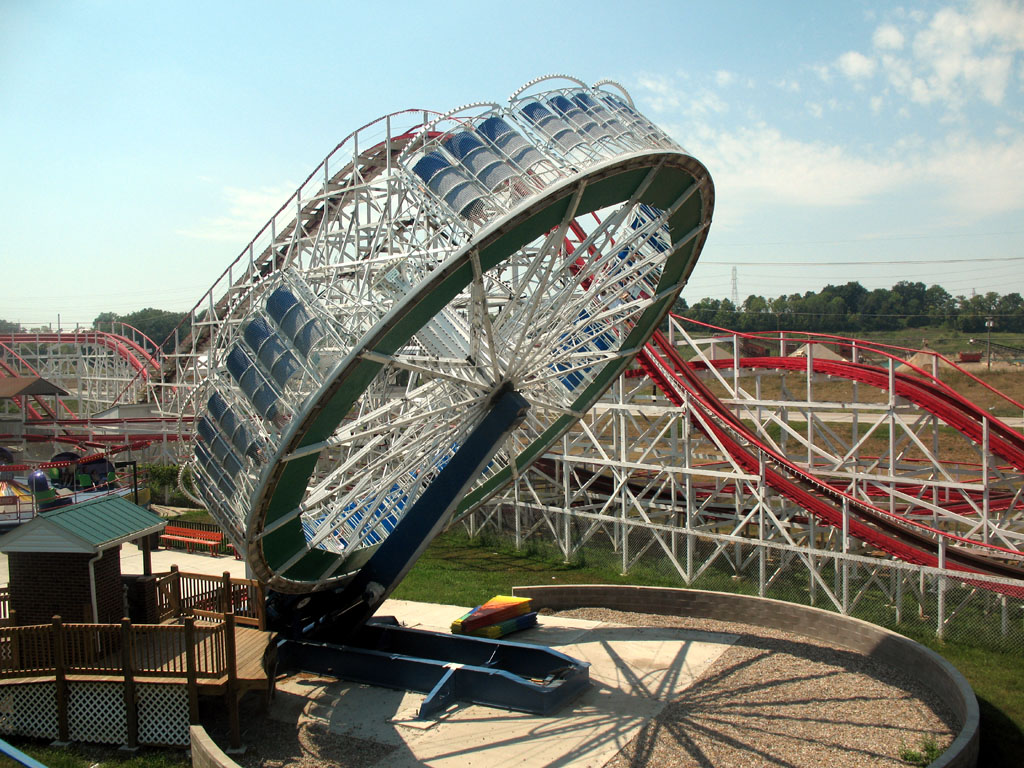
Round up by Frank Hrubetz & Co., permanent installation at Stricker's Grove

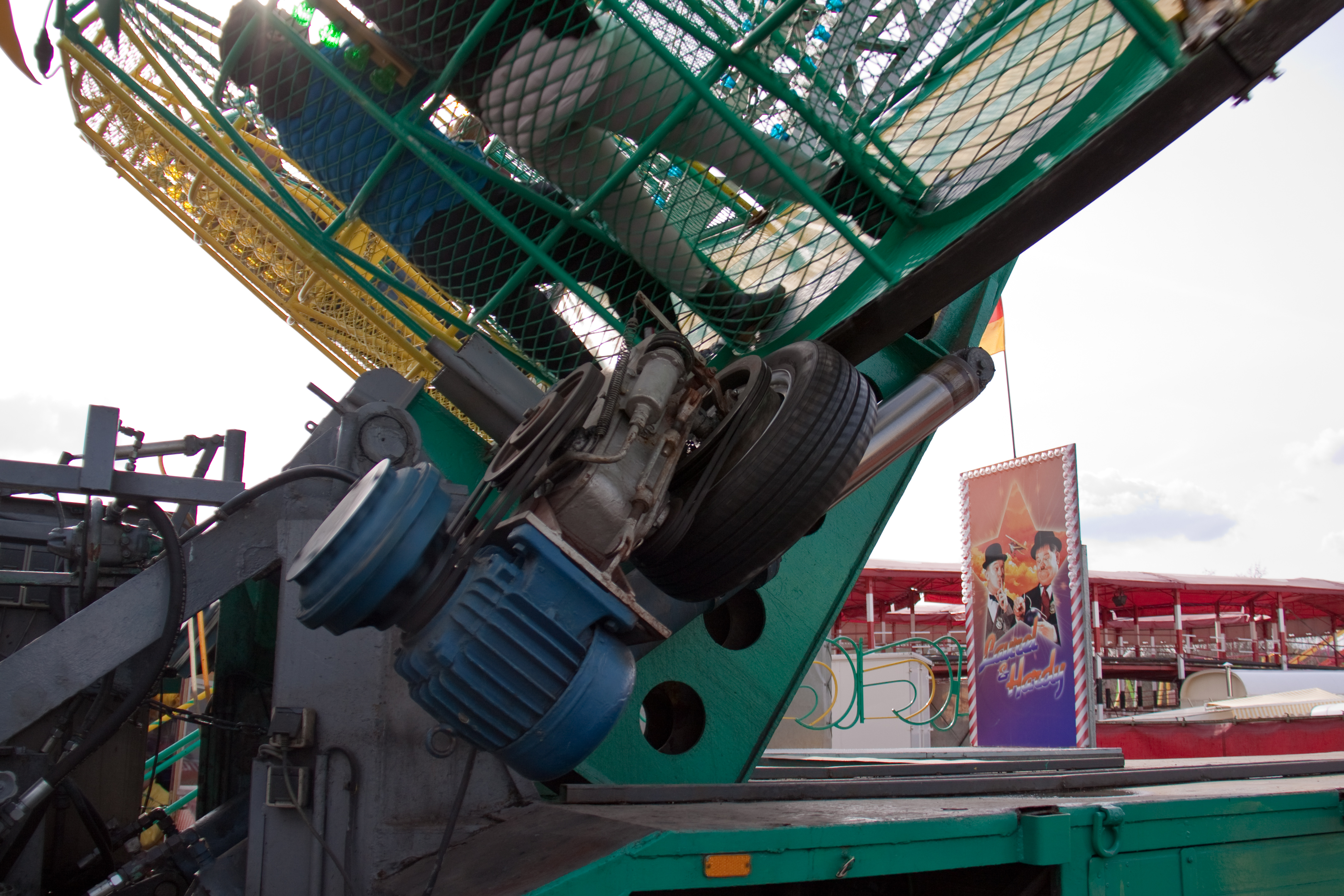
Electric motor, belt, hydraulic pump, and belt to final drive tire propulsion of a mobile Round up by Frank Hrubetz & Co. at a funfair in Germany
