= Lee Eyerly =

American amusement ride inventor (1892–1963)

Lee Ulrich Eyerly
- Born: February 22, 1892; Canton, Fulton County, Illinois
- Died: March 23, 1963 (aged 71); Salem, Oregon
- Known for: Pioneer in aviation and amusement ride inventor
- Spouse: Meta H. Wieglenda
- Children: 4

Lee Ulrich Eyerly (February 22, 1892 – March 23, 1963) was an American civil aviation pioneer and amusement ride manufacturer. Eyerly helped found Salem Oregon's McNary Field, built the Flying E Ranch in Wickenburg, Arizona and invented several amusement park rides including the Loop-O-Plane, the Roll-O-Plane the Fly-O-Plane the Rock-O-Plane, and the Octopus.

== Early life ==
Eyerly was born February 22, 1892 in Canton. In 1909, his family moved to the Judith Basin area of Montana to take advantage of the Homestead Act and Eyerly worked as a cowboy. Throughout his youth, Eyerly displayed an aptitude for mechanics and found work repairing broken farm equipment while building racing automobiles and small model airplanes for amusement.

By 1919, Montana suffered from wind erosion and drought, and the opportunities for repairing farm equipment dwindled. Eyerly moved with his wife and children to Salem, Oregon, where he became a heavy-equipment operator, working on the state’s burgeoning system of roads. As automobiles became more popular, he opened a service station called "The Grease Spot." In 1920, he paid $100 for flying lessons in a Jenny from local World War I pilot Elmer J. Cook and soloed after three hours – the only formal flying instruction he ever received.

== Career ==
From a defunct carnival, Eyerly purchased a Curtis Canuck that he named "Donnie Brook" and began stunt-flying and barnstorming along the west coast. From 1923 to 1926, Eyerly and his family lived in Waldport, Oregon, where he also worked as a ferry operator and owned a tow boat business. In 1926, they moved back to Salem, and he purchased a small Waco mail bi-plane.

In 1927, with bond funds raised by the American Legion, Eyerly purchased a five-acre (20,000 m^{2}) site on one end of the local fairgrounds on which he established a dirt runway, built airplane hangars and founded the Pacific Airplane Service. The airport would eventually evolve into Salem's municipal McNary Field. It was dedicated in 1929 with Eyerly as the airport manager. By 1929, he had founded an aviation school, and later, the first aircraft service station on the west coast.

When the Great Depression hit, he devised an inexpensive plane and pilot trainer and founded the Eyerly Aircraft Company to manufacture them. The first was the Whiffle Hen, a plane which only burned two US gallons (8 L) of fuel per hour of flight. The second was a ground-based flight training device patented under the name "Orientator". The Orientator consisted of a small airplane suspended in what looked like the tines of a giant tuning fork. Air from the electrically driven propeller passed over the wings and rudder, and the operator controlled the movements of the plane in a manner similar to a real aircraft.

The Orientator was produced commercially and five were purchased by the Cuban government. When the Orientator became popular with visitors at state fairs and carnivals, and Eyerly realized the Orientator was more profitable as an amusement park ride. It was renamed the Acroplane and 54 were subsequently produced. Eyerly changed his company's focus from aircraft to amusement rides.

Eyerly developed and patented numerous amusement rides which would become staples of carnival midways, including The Loop-O-Plane (1933), the Roll-O-Plane, the Fly-O-Plane and the Rock-O-Plane (1948). His most popular design was the Octopus, of which almost 400 were sold, and resulted in later variations: the Spider and the Monster. Two of his kiddie carousel rides were the Midge-O-Racer and Bulgy the Whale.

Although Eyerly’s manufacturing business became amusement rides, the name of his company remained Eyerly Aircraft and he maintained his interest in aeronautics. He served on the Oregon Aeronautics Board from the 1920s to 1958, including ten years as its chair. In 2001, Eyerly was named the third inductee into the Oregon Aviation Hall of Fame.

== Personal life ==
Eyerly married Meta H. Wieglenda (1893-1989) on June 22, 1913 in Hobson, Montana. The couple raised two sons and two daughters.

Eyerly twice crashed in an airplane. In 1929, he crashed nose down into the ground while performing in a stunt contest during an air derby in Eugene, Oregon. He suffered a cerebral concussion, fractured right arm, and contusions of the shoulder, neck, back and right hip. Eyerly said he was at fault for violating some fundamentals of flying. The second time he was forced to ditch his plane in the San Francisco Bay when the engine quit on a foggy night. He and his three passengers were picked up by a ferry boat.

Eyerly died of cancer on March 23, 1963, in Salem, Oregon.
