= West View Park =

Former amusement park in West View, Pennsylvania

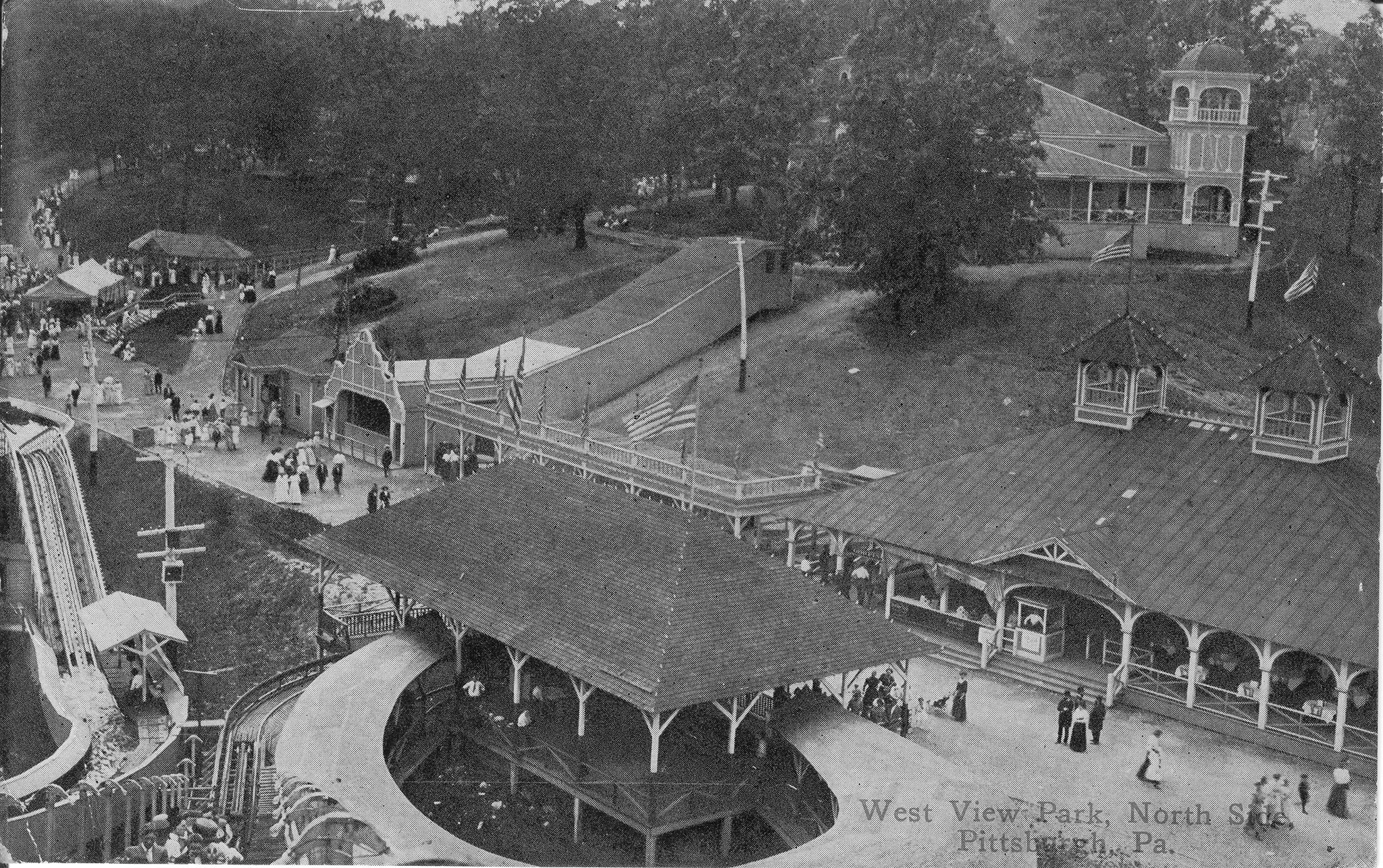
- West View Park, circa 1912
- Interactive map of West View Park
- Location: West View, Pennsylvania, United States
- Coordinates: 40°31′03″N 80°01′52″W
- Status: Defunct
- Opened: May 23, 1906; 120 years ago
- Closed: September 5, 1977; 48 years ago
- Owner: T.M. Harton Company via West View Park Company
- Slogan: "Just for fun!" (1920s-1930s) "The fun park!" (1970s)

West View Park was an amusement park, located in West View, Pennsylvania. It was owned by T.M. Harton Company of Pittsburgh through its subsidiary company West View Park Company, which was founded in December 1905. The park opened on May 23, 1906. The dance hall that was constructed in the park, Danceland, became a landmark for various bands and artists that performed there. The park operated for 71 seasons, closing in 1977 due to declining revenues, higher operating costs, and a lack of investment. The park was in an abandoned state for several years and subjected to arson fires before being torn down in 1980 and replaced by a shopping center and residential facility in 1981.

== History ==
The T.M. Harton Company led by founder, Theodore M. Harton II, opened West View Park in 1906.

=== 1906–1918: T.M. Harton era ===
West View Park opened on May 23, 1906. The park was constructed at a cost of approximately $250,000 (equivalent to $8,958,333 in 2025). The park initially had a log flume ride called Mystic Chute, a roller coaster called Figure Eight, a carousel, and a Pony Track in which people could ride ponies. The Pony Track also featured miniature automobiles which people could ride.

Between 1906 and 1918, West View Park would add several roller coasters. In 1909, the park replaced the original Figure Eight with a new Figure Eight. In 1910, Dips, which was built along the lake in the park, opened. Dips also operated under the name Leap-the-Dips, and the roller coaster remained in the park through its closure in 1977. The park replaced Mystic Chute and the second Figure Eight in 1917 with a new figure 8 roller coaster called Speed-O-Plane. Speed-O-Plane remained in the park through 1927, when it was completely rebuilt and renamed Greyhound.

In 1914, the park replaced the original 1906 carousel with a new carousel. The park also featured several other funhouses and dark rides, including Katzenjammer Castle, Frazzle House, House of Enchantment, and Hilarity Hall.

=== 1919–1930: Post-Harton boom era ===
On March 1, 1919, company founder T.M. Harton died at age 56 of pneumonia.

The first ride not manufactured by the T.M. Harton Company installed at West View Park opened in 1919 - a W.F. Mangels Company ride, The Whip. A number of other amusement rides were added, including a Scooter, a Caterpillar, a second carousel, and a Joy Plane.

In 1927, a new roller coaster was added. It was a racing mobius roller coaster called Racing Whippet. 1929 saw the addition of a Tumble Bug, followed by a Cuddle Up in 1930.

=== 1931–1945: Great Depression and World War II era ===
The Great Depression was a significant setback for T.M. Harton Company. Many of its investments in other places were faltering, resulting in them losing businesses. Furthermore, destabilization throughout the 1930s in Europe led the Harton Company to pull out of Europe. This, combined with the effects of the Great Depression on the Pittsburgh region, resulted in few changes being made to West View Park for the first half of the 1930s. The park did not see a new ride until 1935.

The Pony Track was replaced with the Talkie Temple amphitheater in 1932, where "talkie" movies were shown. After talkies became ubiquitous, the Talkie Temple became a place where shows were put on for children. Beginning with the addition of the Water Skooter ride on the park's lake in 1935, the park would see a new ride added to the park almost every year throughout the end of the Great Depression and World War II. West View Park's first Eyerly Aircraft Company ride was installed in 1936, the Loop-O-Plane. A similar ride manufactured by R.E. Chambers Company, Stratoship, was installed in 1939. Throughout World War II, West View Park added several kiddie rides including a Chair-O-Plane ride.

=== 1946–1965: George M. Harton III era ===
In 1945, George M. Harton III returned from World War II. Harton became general manager of West View Park, a position he would maintain until his death in 1966. This era was the height of West View Park, as many new and modern rides were installed in the park during his tenure.

The park's dance hall, Danceland, was a popular concert venue at this time. The Rolling Stones played at Danceland on June 17, 1964, in front of 400 people.

=== 1966–1977: Post-Harton decline ===
The park opened a Chance Rides Sky Wheel in 1969, and added a miniature railroad in 1970, as well as a new Paratrooper and Tempest ride in the early 1970s. Dark ride Davey Jones Locker was renovated into a new dark ride called Land of the Giants in 1977. West View Park began to struggle as competitors such as Hersheypark and Kennywood Park added larger rides. Without increased investment or the space for larger rides, West View Park could not compete. Additionally, as local school districts were consolidating, the number of school picnic groups going to West View Park was diminishing.

In the early morning of September 29, 1973, Danceland burned to the ground as a result of faulty electrical wiring. Danceland had been valued at $1 million ($7,217,552 in 2024), and it was not rebuilt. West View Park closed after the 1977 season on September 5.

=== Post-amusement park era ===
Several weeks after the end of the 1977 season, T.M. Harton Company announced that West View Park would not reopen. After standing abandoned for several years, the park was eventually razed, and a shopping center and residential facility opened in 1981 on the grounds. The shopping center was named after West View Park, using a carousel horse as a logo in tribute. The shopping center continues to stand today, hosting a Giant Eagle supermarket.

Stick Man, a coming-of-age novel written by West View native Richard Rossi, featured the park. A George A. Romero film The Amusement Park was shot at West View Park in 1973, using volunteers to represent the allegory of aging. The film was thought to be lost until two prints resurfaced shortly before Romero's death.

== Former roller coasters ==
West View Park had many rides and attractions over the years. Below is a list of the nine roller coasters which operated in the park.

Name	Opened	Closed	Manufacturer	Type	Ref(s)
Figure Eight (1906)	1906	1908	T.M. Harton & Company	Wooden coaster	
Figure Eight (1909)	1909	1916	T.M. Harton & Company	Wooden coaster	
Dips	1910	1977	T.M. Harton & Company	Wooden coaster	
Speed-O-Plane/Greyhound	1917	1945	T.M. Harton & Company	Wooden coaster	
Racing Whippet	1927	1977	T.M. Harton & Company	Wooden coaster	
Kiddie Dips	1949	1977	T.M. Harton & Company	Kiddie wooden coaster	
Brownie Coaster	circa 1957	circa 1960	W.F. Mangels Company	Kiddie wooden coaster	
Wild Mouse	1961	1962	Unknown	Wooden coaster	
