= Space Mission Orbit =

S&S Space Shot ride at Movieland Park in Italy

- A view of the tower and rocket

Movieland Park
- Coordinates: 45.476538°N 10.723632°E
- Status: Operating
- Opening date: 2021

Blue Bayou and Dixie Landin'
- Name: Hot Shot
- Coordinates: 30.347028°N 91.027639°W
- Status: Removed
- Opening date: 2006
- Closing date: September 2, 2019

Miracle Strip Amusement Park
- Name: The O2 Tower
- Coordinates: 30.188986°N 85.827594°W
- Status: Removed
- Cost: $2,000,000
- Opening date: March 2002
- Closing date: September 2004

Ride statistics
- Attraction type: Drop tower
- Manufacturer: S&S – Sansei Technologies
- Model: Combo Tower
- Height: 185 ft (56 m)
- G-force: +4/-1
- Riders per vehicle: 12

Space Mission Orbit is an S&S Space Shot ride at Movieland Park in Italy.

== History ==
In 2002, Miracle Strip Amusement Park bought The O2 Tower. This was the last major attraction added to the park before it closed down in 2004. In 2006, it reopened at Dixie Landing as Hot Shot, operating until its penultimate season ended in 2019. It was then bought by Movieland Park and opened for the 2021 season as part of a new space-themed area, along with Space Jumper and Antares Interstellar Space Lines.

== Ride Experience ==
In the queue, a separate chamber with 12 seats shows operators the amount of guests to admit into the ride area. After guests enter the ride area, they secure their over-the-shoulder restraints and clip their secondary seatbelts, similar to ones found on B&M restraints. The ride then weighs the gondola, bounces it 3-4 times, then launches it 185 feet in the air. The ride then bounces before settling at the middle of the tower. The gondola climbs to the top, waits 5-8 seconds, then drops down, repeating the same bouncing cycle before returning to the unload position. The ride attendant then uses a pin to unlock the seatbelts and lift the restraints, ending the ride.
