= Miracle Park =

Miracle Park may refer to:

- Miracle Park (community), a Floridian religious community for sex offenders
- Miracle Park, a facility for physically and mentally challenged children in Gardendale, Alabama
- Miracles Park, a park in Detroit, see The Miracles

== See also ==
- Miracle Beach Provincial Park, British Columbia
- Miracle Strip Amusement Park, Florida
- Miracle Strip at Pier Park, Florida
