= Eyerly Aircraft Company =

American manufactural of amusement rides

- Industry: Manufacturing and design
- Founded: 1930
- Founder: Lee Eyerly
- Defunct: 1985
- Headquarters: Salem, Oregon, United States
- Area served: Worldwide
- Products: Aircraft, amusement rides

Eyerly Aircraft Company was an amusement ride manufacturing company in Salem, Oregon, founded by Lee Eyerly in 1930. The company originally intended to design flight simulators for the aircraft industry but shifted to amusement rides after an early simulator, called Orientator, became a popular pay-per-ride attraction with the public. The company manufactured rides until 1985 and went bankrupt in 1990, following a fatal accident in 1988 on a ride built by the company.

== Aircraft manufacturing ==
Lee Eyerly founded Eyerly Aircraft Company in 1930 to manufacture two inexpensive ways to train pilots which he devised when the Great Depression hit: the Whiffle Hen, a plane which only burned two US gallons (8 L) of fuel per hour of flight, and a ground-based flight training device patented under the name "Orientator". The Orientator consisted of a small airplane suspended in what looked like the tines of a giant tuning fork. Air from the electrically driven propeller passed over the wings and rudder, and the operator controlled the movements of the plane in a manner similar to a real aircraft. The Orientator was produced commercially and eventually renamed "Acroplane".

== Amusement rides ==
A salesman approached Eyerly about selling Acroplanes to carnivals and parks as an amusement ride after noticing several stored on the lot outside Eyerly's shop. While Eyerly was initially skeptical, he agreed to a deal which led to selling about 50 Acroplanes as an amusement ride. The following year, Eyerly changed the company's focus from aircraft to amusement rides based on the successful sales. Eyerly developed and patented numerous amusement rides which would become staples of carnival midways, including The Loop-O-Plane (1933), the Roll-O-Plane, the Fly-O-Plane and the Rock-O-Plane (1947). Perhaps their most popular design was the Octopus, which resulted in later variations: the Spider and the Monster. Two of the company's kiddie carousel rides were the Midge-O-Racer and Bulgy the Whale.

Although Eyerly's manufacturing business became amusement rides, the name of the company remained Eyerly Aircraft Company.

A partial list of the Eyerly Aircraft Company rides and their locations follows.

| Name | Model | Park | Open | Closed | Details |
|---|---|---|---|---|---|
| Monster | Unknown | 1962 Seattle World's Fair | Unknown | Closed | Appears similar to a Monster, but only had 5 arms instead of the typical 6. |
| Rock-O-Plane | Rock-O-Plane | All Star Adventures (Wichita, Kansas) | Unknown | Open | |
| Spider | Spider | All Star Adventures (Wichita, Kansas) | Unknown | Open | |
| Spider | Spider | All Star Amusements (Showman) | Unknown | Unknown | |
| Freddie the Fish | Bulgy the Whale | Arnolds Park | Unknown | Open | |
| Rock-O-Plane | Rock-O-Plane | Arnolds Park | Unknown | Open | |
| Roll-O-Plane | Roll-O-Plane | Arnolds Park | Unknown | Open | |
| Spider | Spider | Arnolds Park | Unknown | Closed | |
| Rock-O-Plane | Rock-O-Plane | Big Amusements (Showman) | Unknown | Open | |
| Monster! | Monster | Blackpool Pleasure Beach | 1968 | 1995 | |
| Dragon Loops | Loop-O-Plane | Blue Sky Amusements (Showman) | Unknown | Open | |
| Killer Whales | Bulgy the Whale | Boardwalk Amusements (Daytona Beach, Florida) | 2017 | Closed | Trailer mounted; new whale vehicles. |
| Monstrous Mamba | Monster | Busch Gardens Tampa | 1976 | 1995 | After removal the ride was sold for scrap. |
| Octopus | Octopus | C&L Shows (Showman) | Unknown | Open | |
| Lobster | Monster | California's Great America | 1976 | Closed | |
| Spider | Spider | Camden Park | Unknown | 2011 | Removed after incident hospitalized three riders. |
| Fury | Monster | Canada's Wonderland | 1981 | 2003 | Originally named Shiva's Fury. Sat in storage after removal. Ultimately sent to Kings Island for spare part usage on their similar Monster. |
| Black Widow | Monster | Carowinds | 1973 | 1987 | Originally named The Witch Doctor. Relocated within park in 1977. Replaced with Cinema 180. |
| Spider | Spider | Castle Park | Unknown | Open | |
| Monster | Monster | Cedar Point | 1970 | 2025 | Refurbished in 2014 alongside renovated Gemini Midway. Closed in 2025 and promptly removed in 2026. |
| Monster | Monster | Coney Island | 1968 | 1971 | Relocated to Kings Island after park closure. |
| Rock-O-Planes | Rock-O-Plane | Coney Island | 2007 | 2019 | Relocated from LeSourdsville Lake Amusement Park. Following removal, listed for sale on Rides4U for $19,000. |
| Clown Fish | Bulgy the Whale | Deggeller Attractions, Inc. (Showman) | Unknown | Open | |
| Whales | Bulgy the Whale | DelGrosso's Amusement Park | Unknown | Open | |
| Monster | Monster | Dorney Park & Wildwater Kingdom | 1995 | 2023 | Removed for addition of Dominator in 1998, but refurbished and returned to operation in 2000. |
| Monster | Monster | EsselWorld (India) | Unknown | Open | |
| Octopus | Octopus | Fantasy Farm (Middletown, Ohio) | 1987 | 1991 | Purchased by Nolan Amusements for $17,500 after park closed. |
| Spider | Spider | Fun Spot America Theme Parks (Atlanta) | Unknown | Open | |
| Black Squid | Spider | Geauga Lake | 1970 | 2007 | Relocated to Kings Dominion; sat in storage but never operated. |
| Monster | Monster | Ghost Town Village | 1992 | 2000 | Ride did not reopen with park in 2007. |
| Bulgy the Goldfish | Bulgy the Whale | Gilroy Gardens | Unknown | Open | |
| Octopus | Octopus | Hammerl Amusements (Showman) | Unknown | Open | |
| Monster | Monster | Hersheypark | 1972 | 1982 | Replaced by Tilt-A-Whirl. |
| Dancer's Fish | Bulgy the Whale | Holiday World & Splashin' Safari | Unknown | Open | Previously named Salmon Run. Relocated within park for 2014 season. |
| Paul Revere's Midnight Ride | Spider | Holiday World & Splashin' Safari | 1978 | 2011 | Originally named Spider Ride. Removed due to dependability issues. |
| Green Machine | Loop-O-Plane | Hydro Free Fair | 1980s | Open | |
| Spider | Spider | Idlewild & Soak Zone | 1982 | Open | |
| Loop-O-Plane | Loop-O-Plane | Idora Park | 1936 | Closed | |
| Monster | Monster | Idora Park | 1972 | Closed | |
| Flying Ocotpus | Octopus | Idora Park | 1938 | Closed | Acquired from Great Lakes Exposition in Cleveland. |
| Rock-O-Plane | Rock-O-Plane | Idora Park | 1976 | 1984 | |
| Spider | Spider | Idora Park | 1973 | Closed | |
| Clown Fish | Bulgy the Whale | James H. Drew Exposition (Showman) | Unknown | Open | |
| Unknown | Spider | Jolly Roger at 30th Street | Unknown | Unknown | |
| Unknown | Loop-O-Plane | Keansburg Amusement Park | Unknown | Unknown | |
| Loop-O-Plane | Loop-O-Plane | Kennywood | Unknown | 1950 | |
| Monongahela Monster | Monster | Kennywood | 1979 | 1989 | |
| Roll-O-Plane | Roll-O-Plane | Kennywood | 1950 | 2003 | |
| Monster | Monster | Kings Dominion | 1975 | 1988 | Originally named Bad Apple. |
| Monster | Monster | Kings Island | 1972 | Open | Relocated from Coney Island after park closure. Maintained with parts from The Fury at Canada's Wonderland. |
| Rock-O-Planes | Rock-O-Plane | Kissel Entertainment (Showman) | Unknown | Unknown | |
| Satellite | Roll-O-Plane | Knoebels Amusement Resort | Unknown | Open | |
| Bulgy the Whale | Bulgy the Whale | Lagoon | 1956 | Open | |
| Rock-O-Planes | Rock-O-Plane | Lagoon | 8 May 1954 | Open | |
| Octopus | Octopus | Lagoon | 8 May 1954 | 1979 | |
| Loop-O-Plane | Loop-O-Plane | Lagoon | 1972 | 1987 | |
| Roll-O-Plane | Roll-O-Plane | Lagoon | 30 Mar 1947 | 1953 | Burned down in fire of 1953. |
| Roll-O-Plane | Roll-O-Plane | Lagoon | 8 May 1954 | 1971 | |
| Roll-O-Plane | Super Roll-O-Plane | Lagoon | 1 Apr 1972 | 2002 | Metal fatigue caused the arm to bend during the ride cycle when it was rotating horizontally. No one on the ride was injured. |
| Fly-O-Plane | Fly-O-Plane | Lake Winnepesaukah | 2000 | Closed | Ejected two riders in 2016. |
| Monster | Monster | Lakemont Park | Unknown | Closed | |
| Octopus | Octopus | Lakemont Park | Unknown | Closed | |
| Loop-O-Plane | Loop-O-Plane | Lakeside Amusement Park | Unknown | Open | |
| Giant Octopus | Octopus | LeSourdsville Lake Amusement Park | 1944 | Closed | |
| Rock-O-Planes | Rock-O-Plane | LeSourdsville Lake Amusement Park | 1949 | Closed | Received new cars in 1990. Relocated to Coney Island after park closure. |
| Mustekala | Monster | Linnanmäki | 1979 | 1984 | After removal the ride was scrapped and replaced with a similar, more efficient model. |
| Spider | Spider | Luna Park, Melbourne | 1983 | Open | Head on top of Spider designed by children's book author Leigh Hobbs in 2001. Ride modified to enable all the arms to load and unload simultaneously. |
| Willie the Whale | Bulgy the Whale | Michael's Amusements (Showman) | Unknown | Open | |
| Bullet | Loop-O-Plane | Miracle Strip Amusement Park | Unknown | 2004 | This ride was sold to Sylvan Beach, New York's Amusement Park after Miracle Strip permanently closed, but later transformed into a Rock-O-Plane. |
| Spider | Monster | Modern Midways (Showman) | Unknown | Open | |
| Rock-O-Plane | Rock-O-Plane | Oaks Amusement Park | Unknown | Open | |
| Spider | Spider | Oaks Amusement Park | Unknown | Open | |
| Ahuna Thrill Ride, The | Octopus | Pacific Ocean Park | Unknown | Closed | Originally named Mrs. Squid. Dual Tub Octopus with a squid decor in the center. |
| Mr. Octopus | Octopus | Pacific Ocean Park | Unknown | Closed | |
| Unknown | Spider | Race City PCB | Unknown | Unknown | |
| Bulgy the Whale | Bulgy the Whale | Santa Cruz Beach Boardwalk | Unknown | Open | |
| Monster | Monster | Silverwood | Unknown | Closed | Replaced by Trabant. |
| Black Dragon | Monster | Six Flags AstroWorld | 1968 | 1977 | |
| Jolly Monster | Monster | Six Flags Magic Mountain | 1973 | 1981 | |
| Spider | Spider | Six Flags New England | 1968 | 2006 | |
| Crazy Legs | Monster | Six Flags Over Texas | 1973 | 1982 | |
| MoMo the Monster | Monster | Six Flags St. Louis | 1973 | 1994 | Replaced by River View Racer. |
| Bulgy the Whale | Bulgy the Whale | Skerbeck Family Carnival (Showman) | Unknown | Open | |
| Monster | Monster | Sunshine Amusements (Showman) | Unknown | 1988 | Crashed during 1988 Broward County Fair, causing a fatality. After the incident, the U.S. Consumer Product Safety Commission asked all owners and operators of Monster attractions to perform metallurgical inspection of their rides. |
| Rock-O-Plane | Rock-O-Plane | Sylvan Beach Amusement Park | Unknown | Open | |
| Bomber | Roll-O-Plane | Sylvan Beach Amusement Park | Unknown | Open | |
| Bulgy the Whale | Bulgy the Whale | Tinkertown Family Fun Park | Unknown | Open | |
| Rock-O-Planes | Rock-O-Plane | Upper Clements Parks | Unknown | 2019 | |
| Monster | Monster | Valleyfair | 1977 | Open | Using the former Octopus at Worlds of Fun for spare parts. |
| Bulgy the Whale | Bulgy the Whale | Wade Shows (Showman) | Unknown | Open | |
| Octopus | Octopus | Whalom Park | Unknown | Closed | |
| Funnel Web | Spider | Wonderland Sydney | 1985 | 1989 | Removed and placed in storage; current whereabouts unknown. |
| Octopus | Monster | Worlds of Fun | 1973 | 2014 | Originally named Oriental Octopus, then later Tailspinner. Ride was absent from park for 1997 season, but returned in 1998 with new cars. Its pieces are currently used for Monster at Valleyfair. |
| Guppies | Bulgy the Whale | Wyandot Lake | Unknown | 2006 | |
| Barracuda | Rock-O-Plane | Wyandot Lake | Unknown | 1999 | |
| Black Squid | Spider | Wyandot Lake | Unknown | 2006 | |
| Little Racers | Midge-O-Racer | Playland, Fresno, CA | 1955 | Open | Ride was one of the originals when Rotary Playland opened in 1955 on the SW corner of Roeding Park in Fresno, CA. It was called "Midge-O-Racer" but the name was changed to "Little Racers" after a generous donation from a local car dealership. |
| Rock-O-Plane | Rock-O-Plane | Thomas Amusements (Newfoundland and Labrador, Canada) | Unknown | Seasonal | |

== Closure ==
Eyerly Aircraft Company continued to produce amusement rides until 1985. A fatal accident occurred at the Broward County Fair in Florida in 1988, when an arm (carrying four rider baskets) of a Monster ride snapped along an existing crack that had been painted over years before, and had then been missed in inspections. A 17-year-old girl died of head injuries when the basket she was riding in collided with another as it fell to the ground, and at least six others were injured. A wrongful death lawsuit was brought against the ride's owner and county fair operator for failure to properly inspect and reinforce the ride, despite Eyerley's warning bulletins recommending maintenance. Following the lawsuit against the operator, Eyerly Aircraft's insurance premiums increased and became unaffordable; the company filed for bankruptcy and closed in 1990. The rights to their rides were later purchased by Oregon Rides Inc.

== See also ==
- Octopus (ride)
