= Blue Bayou and Dixie Landin' =

Amusement parks in Baton Rouge

Blue Bayou Waterpark and Dixie Landin'
- Interactive map of Blue Bayou Waterpark and Dixie Landin'
- Location: 18142 Perkins Road, Baton Rouge, Louisiana, United States
- Coordinates: 30.344116°N 91.026465°W
- Opened: 1989 (Blue Bayou); 1999 (Dixie Landin')
- Closed: July 2, 2025 (Dixie Landin')
- Owner: Samuel B. Haynes, Jr.
- Operating season: May through September

Attractions
- Total: 20 (Blue Bayou)
- Roller coasters: 0
- Website: https://bluebayouwaterpark.com/ http://www.dixielandin.com/ (defunct)

Blue Bayou Waterpark and Dixie Landin' are adjacent amusement parks in Baton Rouge, Louisiana. Blue Bayou is a water park, while the former Dixie Landin' was a dry amusement park with thrill rides. Both parks operated under shared admission until Dixie Landin's permanent closure in 2025, while Blue Bayou continues to operate.

== Blue Bayou ==
Original Blue Bayou logo (1989-2025)

Blue Bayou was opened in 1989 on the site of the previous Coursey's Fantasy Water Park. It has 20 attractions including a lazy river, a behemoth bowl, a quadruple aqualoop, a wave pool (retained from the original park), and a ProSlide Tornado. The park slowly expanded over the next twenty years, with its newest attraction being "Mambo", a quadruple aqualoop which opened in August 2012. For the 2012 season, it also updated its lazy river, bathhouses, food menus, and kids' section. It was previously marketed as "The Land of the Giants", with the park advertising five of its water slides as the world's largest of their types.

From the park's reopening in 2021 to 2024, Blue Bayou was the only side of the park to operate, but subsequently remained closed in favor of Dixie Landin' for the 2025 season. Following Dixie Landin's permanent closure in 2025, Blue Bayou was leased to Leisure Sports and Recreation, LLC, and reopened under the company's new management on May 16, 2026.

=== Attractions ===
- Mambo
- Voodoo
- Azuka
- Racers
- Conja'
- Mad Moccasins
- Pirate's Cove
- Flyin' Pirogue
- High Water
- Awesome Twosome
- Hurricane Bay
- Lafitte's Plunge
- Atchafalaya Run (formerly Lazy River)

== Dixie Landin' ==
Dixie Landin' was built in 1999. Some of its rides came from the defunct Fun Fair Park, a previous park also owned and operated by Blue Bayou and Dixie Landin' founder Samuel B. Haynes, which operated from 1963 to 1999 at the intersection of Florida Boulevard (U.S. Route 190) and Airline Highway. It includes rides for all ages, including kiddie rides and thrill seeker rides. At its largest, Dixie Landin' featured 27 attractions, including an S&S combo drop tower, a log flume, three roller coasters, and a variety of flat rides. The drop tower, Hot Shot, was originally the O2 Tower from Panama City Beach, Florida's now defunct Miracle Strip Amusement Park. In 2008, Hurricane Gustav destroyed the Coca-Cola concert stage, but a new one was built in time for the 2009 season.

On June 2, 2025, after eight days of seasonal operation, it was announced that Dixie Landin' would be closed permanently due to lack of attendance. The park's ownership began to remove rides from the property, as well as the pedestrian bridge connecting Dixie Landin' to its former parking lot and gate across Highland Road, in April 2026.

=== Roller coasters ===
Name	Year opened	Manufacturer	Type	Comments
Ragin' Cajun	2001	Vekoma	Boomerang	Previously operated at Hafan y Môr Holiday Park in Pwllheli, Wales, United Kingdom
Gilbeaux's Galaxi	2001	S.D.C.	Galaxi	Previously operated at Pontchartrain Beach in New Orleans, Louisiana, U.S. and the nearby defunct Fun Fair Park.
Loco-Loco	2001	E&F Miler Industries	Family Coaster / 24ft Harvest Express	Previously operated at Nut Tree Park in Vacaville, California.

=== Amusement rides ===
Name	Year opened	Manufacturer	Type
Jambalaya	1999	Eli Bridge Company	Scrambler
Flyin’ Tiger	1999	HUSS	Enterprise
Over The Rainbow	1999	HUSS	Rainbow
Side Winder	2019	Moser's Rides	Sidewinder
The Splinter	1999	D.P.V. Rides	Log Flume
Tilt-A-Whirl	1999	Sellner Manufacturing	Tilt-A-Whirl
Zydeco Express	1999	S.D.C.	Music Express
Barataria Pirate	1999	HUSS	Swinging Ship
Cajun Collision	1999	WGH Transportation Engineering	Bumper Cars
Fouchon Flyer	1999	Hrubetz	Paratrooper
Frog Hopper	1999	S&S Power	Frog Hopper
Gumbo Yo-Yo	1999	Chance Rides	Yo-Yo
Space Odyssey	1999	Chance Rides	Whip
Gasoline Alley	1999	Arrow Dynamics	Track-car
Manchac Railroad	1999	Chance Rides	Train ride
Merry-Go-Round	1999	Chance Rides	Kiddie Carousel
Old 99’s	1999	Chance Rides	Track Car ride
The Delta Crop Duster	1999	Allan Herschell Company	Plane Ride
Around Town	1999	Zamperla	Crazy Bus
Black Widow	1999	Eyerly	Octopus
Boat Race	1999	Allan Herschell Company	Boat Ride
Drums Of Fun	1999	Venture Manufacturing	Drum-style tea cups

== Incidents ==
=== Over the Rainbow ===
On June 9, 2006, a 2-year-old boy broke his arms and legs after falling at least 25 feet (7.6 m) from the “Over the Rainbow” ride. He was seated next to 3½-year-old sister but about 8 feet (2.4 m) from his mother at the time; his mother says she was told that the other adjacent seat was out of order.

=== Xtreme ===
On July 11, 2010, around 4:00 p.m., a woman fell to her death from the now-defunct Xtreme roller coaster. An investigation into the accident by the Office of the Louisiana State Fire Marshal could not determine an exact cause for the accident.

=== OSHA violations ===
On August 4, 2011, Blue Bayou and Dixie Landin' was fined $25,295 by the U.S. Department of Labor for numerous labor violations. The park was allowing minors to work more than eight hours a day. 49 minors in the 14- to 15-year-old category were found to be subject to child labor provision violations.

== Hurricane Gustav ==
Hurricane Gustav caused moderate damage to both parks on September 1, 2008. Many trees were snapped, blown over, or uprooted. The Coca-Cola stage was destroyed, the awnings were blown off the Azuka, a portion of the Pirate's Cove roof was blown off, and a storage building alongside the Lazy River had its metal chimney knocked down onto the roof (it still remains lying on the roof, and was actually damaged again by Hurricane Isaac in 2012); the storage building contains the Lazy River's water flow pump. Multiple other attractions and buildings were affected. Luckily for Blue Bayou/Dixie Landin', the parks had just ended their season when the storm struck. They reopened in time for the 2009 season.
