= LeSourdsville Lake Amusement Park =

Amusement park in Monroe, Ohio, U.S.

- Previously known as Americana Amusement Park (1978–1999)
- Interactive map of LeSourdsville Lake Amusement Park
- Location: Monroe, Ohio, United States
- Coordinates: 39.445556°N 84.433611°W
- Status: Defunct
- Opened: May 8, 1922
- Closed: 2002
- Owner: Edgar Streifthau (1922–1960); Howard Berni (1960–1990); Leisure International, Inc (1990–1996); Park River II (1996–2000); Jerry Couch (2000–2017); City of Monroe (2017-present)

LeSourdsville Lake Amusement Park was an amusement park located in Monroe, Ohio. Founded by Edgar Streifthau, the park originally opened in 1922 as a family picnic destination with swimming amenities. Throughout the 1940s, LeSourdsville Lake transformed into an amusement park with the addition of rides, attractions, and an arcade. The park was sold in 1961, and following heavy competition from nearby Kings Island, it was rebranded Americana Amusement Park in 1978. An electrical fire in 1990 caused over $5 million in damages and led to bankruptcy. The park continued to operate under several different owners before eventually closing in 1999.

Americana briefly reopened in 2002 under the original name LeSourdsville Lake, but the effort by new owner Jerry Couch was short-lived as the park failed to turn a profit. Remaining rides and attractions were either sold or later demolished. In 2017, the city of Monroe received a portion of the land to build a city park and regional bicycle trail, and another portion was sold to a local vocational school seeking to build a new campus location.

== History ==
Edgar Streifthau of Middletown, Ohio, opened LeSourdsville Lake Amusement Park on May 8, 1922. Streifthau purchased a plot of land that formerly housed an ice manufacturing facility in the tiny village of LeSourdsville, and construction began in 1921. Streifthau and his business partner, Bill Rothfuss, built a bathhouse, a restaurant, dance hall and a bridge crossing the abandoned Miami-Erie Canal that passed through the property. They also constructed a concrete bottom in the man-made lake for swimming. Streifthau constructed the first of several "vacation" cabins surrounding the lake and platforms for camping tents. Streifthau's brother, Ernest, joined as a partner as Bill Rothfuss focused on his career at nearby ARMCO Steel (later known as AK Steel).

=== 1930s ===
Despite the onset of The Great Depression, Streifthau continued to expand the park's offerings. He expanded the bathhouse, installed a new parking lot, built the park's first office building, and imported over 1,000 tons of white sand for the beach. Admission prices, food prices and employee wages were cut. Just before the park was to open for the 1934 season, an accidental fire destroyed the bathhouse. Streifthau was desperate to rebuild a new bathhouse before the park opened in May. He went to the Middletown Lumber Company and solicited the assistance of a personable and talented draftsman, Don Dazey. On May 30, the park opened with a new bathhouse.

Dazey convinced Streifthau that dances could be successful without the fighting and melee that plagued the park in earlier years. Dazey constructed Stardust Gardens next door to the bathhouse. Bands such as Ray McKinley, Glenn Miller, the Dorsey Brothers and Stan Kenton graced the rich, maple wood floor to the delight of thousands of customers.

Dazey also solicited area companies to hold their picnics at the park and began an important tradition that continued until the park closed. Streifthau also added two toboggan water slides, a waterwheel, seven diving boards, and a 20-foot (6.1 m) high platform for diving. In 1939, Streifthau purchased a 1927 John Miller wooden coaster from Moxahalia Amusement Park in Zanesville, Ohio for $35,000. The coaster was rebuilt and named "The Cyclone."

=== 1940s ===
The 1940s represented an important decade for LeSourdsville Lake. The park became the "Miami Valley's Chosen Playground" and became the hottest entertainment spot during the summer months.

In 1941, the park added The Whip and a Ferris wheel to its thrill ride line-up. Bands appearing in the Stardust Gardens Ballroom included Eddie Kadle, Earl Holderman, Gene Roberts, Mary Marshall, Little Joe Hart, Eugene Jelesnick, Billy Snyder, Tommy Flynn, Billy Yates, Jimmy Scriber and Emerson Gill. The following summer, Carl Taylor, Lloyd Labrie and Michael Mehas joined the Stardust Gardens headliners. Streifthau also built a new front entrance and added a section of new midway near the entrance to The Cyclone.

After World War II, LeSourdsville Lake continued to grow and prosper. In 1947, two stream-lined trains were added to The Cyclone and a kiddie racing car ride was installed. On July 4, the park celebrated its largest one-day turnout in its history when 30,168 came through the front gate. Big bands popular in 1947 included, Barney Rapp, Jimmy Miller, Ches Walker, Les Shepard, Harold Greenanyer, Del Mason, Whitey Howard, Karl Taylor and Johnny Doom.

Major improvements were visible as LeSourdsville Lake opened its 1949 season. New rides for 1949 included a Rock-O-Plane. A state-of-the-art masonry building was constructed next to The Cyclone entrance. New rides and attractions included the Fun Parade, and a penny arcade. Big bands making appearances included Sammy Leeds, Whitey Howard, Tommy Robbins, Al Cassidy, Karl Taylor, Leo Pieper, Skitch Henderson, Jimmy James and Earl Holderman.

=== 1950s ===
The 1950s ushered in some changes for LeSourdsville Lake as the park's image began to decline from its peak the previous decade. Big bands that once graced the Stardust Gardens Ballroom throughout the week were now featured on weekends only. Streifthau renovated the bathhouse to accommodate the large number of swimmers the park serviced each year. The brick addition to the bathhouse also "provided a fire resistive baring at an amusement park.

New rides for 1951 included a Tilt-A-Whirl. By 1954, Streifthau was manufacturing his own line of turnpike cars in a partnership with Oxford, Ohio resident Frank Dodd. Kiddieland saw five new rides added, including a new steel coaster called the Jack Rabbit. In 1956, the Turnpike ride was built next to the Screechin' Eagle (formerly The Cyclone) roller coaster.

Streifthau and Dazey realized that more had to be done to modernize LeSourdsville Lake. Disneyland opened in 1955 to such rave reviews from the public that they expected other parks to become just as modern and clean. At Cedar Point, a multimillion-dollar renovation was under way by 1957 in an attempt to become the "Disneyland of the Midwest." Streifthau decided to take out a loan and initiate a multi-year improvement plan.

In 1957, a stone tower and fountain were constructed at the main entrance. Streifthau was ready to enter 1959 with a new vision. However, Dazey died in June 1959 of cancer. A local bank required Streifthau to immediately pay off the outstanding loan and he was forced to sell. He still owned 20 acres of land adjoining the park and he created a new, smaller theme park called Fantasy Farm.

=== 1960s ===
The 1960s ushered in a prosperity for the 40-year-old park. Former Cedar Point concessionaires Howard Berni and Frank Murru were successful in their purchase of the park for $550,000. They took over in 1961 and quickly continued the renovation effort that stopped prematurely when Dazey died. The WING radio Lesourdsville Lake WING FLING featured on air personalities, Lou Swanson, Rod Williams, Jim Smith and a famous sign off by Gene By Golly Barry.

A Wild Mouse roller coaster was the newest ride to greet visitors for the 1961 season. In addition, an 18-hole miniature golf course and a new Arcade building were built at the end of the midway next to the Screechin' Eagle roller coaster. The park also featured a native Hawaiian ornamental garden with hand carved Tiki and live palm trees. Unfortunately, the year was plagued by abnormal amount of rain which affected attendance. At the end of the season, the area's first "pay one price plan" was established. For $1.65 for adults and 75 cents for children customers could ride all day.

In 1964, Middletown resident William "Bill" Barr became a partner in the park and contributed his creative ideas and endless energy to help make LeSourdsville Lake the favorite park for hundreds of thousands of patrons. Between 1962 and 1969, a number of attractions were added to the LeSourdsville Lake line-up, including a NAD train (called the Iron Horse), a remodeled Haunted House, a Trabant and a new theme area called Tombstone Territory. The big band names of Jack Huntlemen, Sammy Kaye, Buddy Rogers and Bobby Grayson were slowly replaced by regular appearances by WLW's Bob Braun, The Cool Ghoul from WXIX, WKRC's Glenn "Skipper" Ryle and a host of television stars, movie celebrities and music acts.

=== 1970s ===
By the mid-1970s, LeSourdsville Lake was drawing about 600,000 patrons annually. The opening of Kings Island amusement park just a few miles away in nearby Mason, Ohio in 1972 didn't dampen the spirits of Howard Berni. "We wish them luck," said Howard in an interview in the Cincinnati Enquirer. "The first year we may feel a pinch because the local people will be curious, but we don't anticipate it will be to the point where it will bother our business. On the other hand, if Kings Island brings in the tourist, we will benefit from the overflow. We aren't going to fade away. They have the worries, not us."

In 1972 a new Calypso ride was installed, and named simply The Calypso. In 1975, Bill Barr retired to Italy, and park veteran William "Bill" Robinson took over some of duties left by Barr. Bill's knack for producing interesting promotions enabled the park to enjoy large crowds. Some of the more novel promotions developed by Bill included the 1976 designation as the country's only "Official" Bicentennial Amusement Park, the Coca-Cola/WSAI Radio Rock, Roll n' Remember concerts, and the Jell-O Jump, where contestants jumped into a huge barrel of gelatin to find the winning key to a new car.

During the late 1970s, the park presented brief (15 minute) musical shows every day on the midway stage that advertised various park attractions. The shows featured the "Krazy Kritters" (people in whimsical animal costumes) and consisted of a pre-recorded narration that a “master of ceremonies” critter pretended to speak into a microphone. At particular points in the presentation, the tape machine was programmed to pause after the M.C. critter suggested that the band play a song. The band (also in costumes), whose characters were called Do, Rey, Me, and Fa would play a song. During the summers of 1977 and 1978, the band was a local Rock band called Septer. And in 1979 a local band named Renegade (Tom Brewer, Jim Schrader, Jim Walsh and Brian Bauer)

In 1978, the name of the park was changed to Americana Amusement Park - the Great American Amusement Park. Along with a name change came a $3.5 million, three-year renovation plan to help keep the park a viable alternative to Kings Island. New attractions included a 1200-seat tent featuring performances of the Hanneford Family Circus, a seven character animated band called the Bear Country Jubilee, and the Coca-Cola Great American Thrill Show theater.

=== 1980s ===
The recession in the early 1980s began affecting attendance at the park. As a result, gate admission was reduced from $6.95 to $5.50 in 1982. New attractions that year included a transformation of the Hanneford Circus tent into a platform for Bumper Buggys, a soft-core version of bumper cars.

The highlight of the decade was the addition of the Raging Thunder Log Flume in 1984. The attraction represented the largest investment in the park's 77-year history and helped boost the annual attendance over 500,000. The flume, designed by Ron Berni and built by Barr Engineering of Minnesota, was located in a former bird sanctuary in the old Tombstone Territory section of the park. The area was renamed Logger's Run after the flume was added.

In 1985, the park auctioned off the horses from its 1924 PTC #71 carousel. Although some fans were disappointed about the sale, the carousel burned to the ground in an accidental fire in 1988. Over $500,000 in damages were reported, including the loss of the park's 1925 Dodgem ride.

In 1987, the Galleon swinging ship was installed in Logger's Run.

After the carousel fire, the park purchased a used Galaxi roller coaster from Nobles Funland Amusement Park in Paducah, Kentucky, called The Serpent. Attendance at the park was maintained at 500,000.

=== 1990s ===
On January 8, 1990, an electrical fire broke out in the Bathhouse and Stardust Gardens Ballroom. The result was over $5 million in losses, including a first aid office, arcade, games building, locker rooms and food concessions. Ride parts and cars from the Rock-O-Plane, Flying Scooters, Bumper Buggy and two kiddie rides were destroyed. The park quickly enlisted the assistance of local labor unions to rebuild the area in time for the April opening with payment to come later in the summer. By May, a new 300-seat indoor/outdoor food court, an arcade, a Dodgem' ride and a refurbished Flying Scooter ride reopened on the site of the fire. Meanwhile, the park began experiencing problems with its insurance company regarding its multimillion-dollar claim.

The hiring of local students and senior citizens was always a challenge because of the keen competition of other attractions in the area. To help alleviate that problem, the park entered into an agreement with a Mexican college to hire Mexican students for the summer. The plan quickly fell apart and the park experienced a lot of negative media coverage regarding claims by the students of poor living conditions in their dorms and illegal working conditions. The local unions, who normally booked their picnics at the park, suddenly canceled their lucrative picnic outings due to the allegations and the park began a deep decline in attendance and revenue. By the end of season, attendance reached an all-time low of just under 200,000. The park then learned that its insurance company would only pay $3 million in claims, leaving the park to pick up the remaining $2 million in expenses. In December, the park was forced to file for Chapter 11 bankruptcy.

By Spring 1991, the park was purchased and reopened by Leisure International, a group of former park management. Joe Faggionato, Guy Sutton, Lenny Gottstein and Don Robison took over the park and began the long, hard effort of erasing the previous year's nightmare from customers, including the local unions. In July, Guy Sutton left the park to become the operations director at Clemonton Lake in New Jersey.

The trio built a petting zoo and opened a new restaurant for the 1992. Their efforts enabled the park to build the attendance back up to just over 330,000. In 1993, the animated Bear Country Jubilee show was sold to the Jungle Jim's International Market in Fairfield, Ohio. No new attractions were added during the year, however, attendance increased to 412,500. During the 1994 and 1995 seasons, Leisure International spent an additional $6 million to upgrade landscaping and infrastructure throughout the park. By 1995, Faggionato, Gottstein and Robison realized that a bigger company with more capital would be needed to continue upgrading the park so Americana was put up for sale.

In 1996, Park River Corporation, owners of Coney Island of Cincinnati in Cincinnati, Ohio, purchased Americana for an estimated $3 million. Between 1996 and 1998, over $1 million was spent on upgrading the Screechin' Eagle roller coaster, developing a new paint scheme of magenta and teal, introducing a new merchandising line in the gift shop consisting of unique Americana emblazoned clothing, and adding a variety of rides, including a carousel, Ferris wheel, and the Tempest. In 1997, Park River owner Ronald Walker died unexpectedly and family members expressed concern about the future of the park. The park was quietly listed for sale in 1998.

In December 1999, informational letters regarding the 2000 Family Funpacks (similar to season passes) were distributed across the area. In a shocking announcement on January 6, 2000, Park River announced the closing of the park for the 2000 season.

=== 2000s ===
On May 24, 2000 Hamilton businessman Jerry Couch purchased the park from Park River Corporation. He said he would change the park's name to "Couch's Americana Amusement Park at LeSourdsville Lake" out of respect for the park's 77-year-old history. "The job market is tight and I've missed the window of opportunity to hire kids who are getting out of school," he said in a Cincinnati Enquirer interview. "But, we'll be ready, possibly in July."

Initial plans called for a year-round facility with Halloween and Christmas activities, construction of a campground, the opening of Couch's Campers Superstore on the property and new food services.

In April 2002, former carnival owners, the Pugh Family, established the LeSourdsville Group and was hired to manage the park for the 2002 season. The name of the park was changed to "The Great American Amusement Park at LeSourdsville Lake."

Over $3 million in improvements were made including the addition of 10 new rides leased by the Pugh group. They included a fun house, a swinging pirate ship, a kids bumper car ride, the Zipper, the Music Express and the Tip-Top Teacups Ride. The adult bumper car ride was removed due to mechanical problems. In addition, a $150,000 ride safety inspection system was installed to improve preventive maintenance.

When the park opened to the public on June 5, the name of the park was changed once again to "LeSourdsville Lake." A park spokesperson stated that the name change was done because "that's how people remember it."

The park operated Thursdays through Sundays. "Saturdays and Sundays have been packed to the point that our parking lot was just about full, which we would estimate to be 8,000 to 10,000 people," said park Marketing Director Mike Mefford.

After experiencing a successful summer, the park unexpectedly closed a week prior than planned and announced that it was looking for a new management company to operate the park for 2003. Plans for the upcoming "LeScaresville Lake - a Halloween fright event" was cancelled. The Pugh management team filed for bankruptcy and failed to pay some of the park employees wages due to them.

Rides brought in earlier in the year were repossessed after the season ended due to non-payment by the Pugh management group. Rides included the Music Express, the Zipper, the Western Express Train, the Tip Top, the Mini Indy and a fun house. All of the rides were portable and not installed as permanent rides.

On January 24, 2003, Couch's LeSourdsville Lake RV Super Center held its grand opening at the park. The park's old dormitory used during the 1990 season, was remodeled and made a part of the new store and showroom. "With the opening of the ....Super Center, we are one step closer to fulfilling our ultimate goal of establishing an RV and amusement park combination." said Couch in a Middletown Journal interview.

In April, local media began questioning the status of the park for 2003. After several days passed, the Middletown Journal reported that the park may open for the 2003 season. "There's definitely a possibility that we could open this year. I'm not saying that will happen," said a publicist with Expo Management & Ad Agency in Cincinnati, which was hired to handle marketing for Couch's camper company.

A press release stated that several options are being considered for the park, including 1) updating the rides and creating a "more competitive" atmosphere, 2) running the park as is with a new management team and 3) selling the park.

Couch filed a lawsuit against the Pugh management group for non-payment of bills and rental fees totaling more than $100,000. The courts dismissed the lawsuit because the management group had filed for bankruptcy.

In February 2004, former Peony Park enthusiasts, Carl Jennings announced that he was seeking to purchase the park. A deal could not be reached with Couch.

By May 2006, most of the rides were sold.

In 2009, the park's steel roller coaster, The Serpent, received a second life, as it opened in May 2009 under the same name at Kokomo's Family Fun Center in Saginaw, Michigan.

The park was featured on the History Channel's Life After People: The Series. The show explored how weathering was eating away at the park and how it will be unrecognizable in 20 years without human maintenance. One of the closed rides, the Screechin' Eagle, was featured in Life After People: The Series and collapsed after 20 years after disappearance of humans.

=== 2010–present ===
In late August 2011, The Screechin' Eagle roller coaster, which stood for over 70 years, was demolished without any public announcement. Couch expressed fear that something "terrible" would happen with the trespassers that regularly visited the park. Parts of the track and trains were sent to the National Roller Coaster Museum and Archives in Plainview, Texas.

In early 2015, Jerry Couch retired and closed his Monroe RV Showroom. Buildings and parts of rides in the Americana portion of the park as well as the Fantasy Farm park were left abandoned.

In 2017, it was announced that Butler Tech, a county-wide vocational school, purchased 36 acres of the former LeSourdsville Lake parking lot and the former Fantasy Farm Amusement Park property for $2.7 million to develop a new campus. Couch donated the land that LeSourdsville Lake sat on to Monroe, Ohio, for development of a city park and regional bicycle trail. The funding of the community park project, undertaken by the city, was covered by a 0.5-percent earned income tax increase.

In mid 2018, all of the parks remaining structures, except for the sky rides station, the former park administrative building, the arches at the main entrance and entrance to the former food court, a large cinder block storage building, and seven of the former picnic pavilions, were demolished. The construction of Monroe Bicentennial Commons, the public park replacing LeSourdsville Lake, began in April 2021.

== Rides and attractions ==
Ride	Park section	Year opened	Year closed	Description
Animal Train/Critter Train	Kid's World			
Antique Autos		1962	2002	driveable Model-T replicas, designed by park owner Howard Berni
Ball Crawl	Kid's World		2002	
Bean Hollow petting zoo		1992	2002	
Bear Country Jubilee	Logger's Run	1978	1999	animatronics show - sold to Jungle Jim's International Market in Fairfield, Ohio
The Belle of LeSourdsville	Lake LeSourdsville	1956	2002	Large paddle boat
Bumper Buggys		1982		bumper cars housed in the former circus tent
Calypso		1972	2002	Calypso ride - sold to Fun Spot Amusement Park & Zoo in Angola, Indiana until 2008, when park closed; 2016 sold to Holiday World & Splashin' Safari in Santa Claus, Indiana, renamed The Firecracker for 2017 season
Car Ride	Kid's World			
Carousel		1924	1988	PTC #71, built 1924 - some wooden horses auctioned off in 1985, carousel burned to ground in 1988
Demolition Derby			2002	Dodgem bumper cars (built in 1925) - damaged in 1985 fire; 2002 removed due to mechanical issues
Electric Rainbow		1977	2002	Round Up (ride) Sold to Stricker's Grove, Ross, OH 2006
Elephant Ride	Kid's World			
Ferris Wheel		1941		
Flying Scooters				
Frog Bog	Kid's World			
Fun house		2002	2002	(repossessed)
Fun Parade				
Galleon Swinging Ship	Logger's Run	1987		
Haunted House	Tombstone Territory (later renamed Logger's Run)	1969		
Helicopters	Kid's World			
Heinrich Wild Mouse		1961	1964	roller coaster
Honey Bees	Kid's World			flying bee ride
Iron Horse		1964	2002	NAD train. Second train added 1970
Jack Rabbit	Kid's World (Kiddieland)	1955	1968	kiddie coaster
Kiddie Boats	Kid's World			
Kiddie racing car ride	Kid's World (Kiddieland)	1947		
Kiddie Swings	Kid's World			
Kiddie Wheel	Kid's World	1996		Ferris Wheel
LeSourdsville Lake swimming lake	LeSourdsville Lake	1922	2002	man-made lake, shortly after opening, lined bottom with concrete. Used for swimming until 1976.
LeSourdsville Lake bathhouse		1922		
Little Dipper		1968	2002	Reloaded to Sluggers & Putters
Merry-Go-Round	Kid's World	1996		
Mine Scrambler	Logger's Run			Scrambler-ride
Mini Indy/Indy 500		2002	2002	repossessed
Music Express		2002	2002	repossessed
Pony Carts	Kid's World			
Raging Thunder	Logger's Run (formerly called Tombstone Territory)	1984	2002	Log Flume Designed by Ron Berni. Most expensive ride installed at park @$950,000.
The Ripsaw	Logger's Run			
Rock-O-Plane		1949	2002	sold to Coney Island of Cincinnati
Sea Cycles	LeSourdsville Lake			Pedal boats
Screechin' Eagle/The Cyclone/The Space Rocket		1939	2002	a 1927 John Miller wooden coaster - 1939 purchased from Moxahalia Amusement Park in Zanesville, Ohio; 2011-demolished
Serpent		1985	2002	Galaxy steel coaster - purchased from Nobles Funland Amusement Park in Paducah, Kentucky; sold to Kokomo's Family Fun Center in Saginaw, Michigan
Sky Ride		1965	2002	
Sky Fighters	Kid's World	1962	2002	
Speedway Turnpike		1956	2002	
Star Fighters				
Stardust Gardens Ballroom		1934	1990	dance hall/big band venue. Burned down in an electrical fire 1990.
Stick & Pick				
Super Slide		1930s		water slide with multiple tracks
Swing Ride	Kid's World			
Tempest		1996	2002	sold to Coney Island of Cincinnati
Tilt-A-Whirl		1951	2002	
Tip-Top Teacups Ride		2002	2002	repossessed
Trabant		1969		
Tubs-O-Fun	Kid's World			
Turtle Race/Bust One	Kid's World			
Umbrella ride (2 of them)	Kid's World			
Water Skooters	LeSourdsville Lake	1949	1990s	mini speed boats
Western Express Train		2002	2002	repossessed
The Whip		1941	2002	
Wild Kingdom miniature golf		1961		18-hole
Zipper		2002	2002	repossessed
