= List of amusement rides =

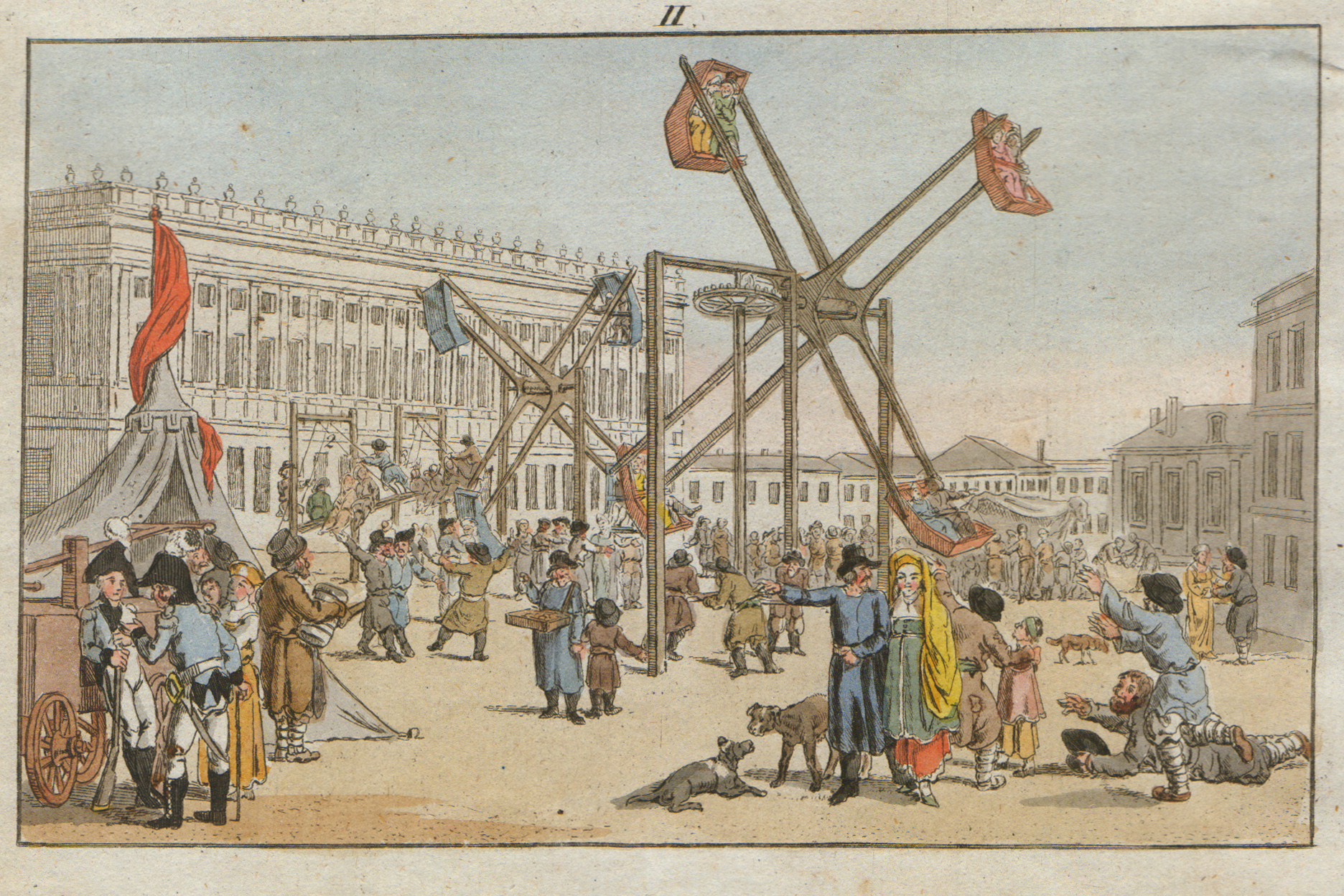
Early pleasure wheel in Russia, 1807

Amusement rides, sometimes called carnival rides, are mechanical devices or structures that move people to create fun and enjoyment.

Rides are often perceived by many as being scary or more dangerous than they actually are. This could be due to the design, having acrophobia, or from hearing about accidents involving rides that are similar. For some, the adrenaline associated with riding amusement rides is part of the experience.

They are common at most annual events such as fairs, traveling carnivals, and circuses around the world. Sometimes music festivals and concerts also host amusement park rides.

== Types of rides ==
- Flat rides are usually those that move their passengers on a plane generally parallel to the ground, such as rides that spin around a vertical axis, like carousels and twists; and ground-level rides such as bumper cars. The term is also used to refer to amusement rides that are not classified as dark rides, rollercoasters, transport rides, or water rides.
- In gravity rides, gravity is responsible for all or some of the movement where any vertical movement is not about a fixed point, such as roller coasters, water slides and drop towers.
- Vertical rides usually move their passengers in a vertical plane and around a fixed point, such as Ferris wheels, Enterprise and Skydiver.
- As of the 2010s, some rides employ virtual reality.

=== Specific themes ===
- Dark rides
- Bumper cars
- Haunted house
- Funhouse
- Pendulum ride
- Rollercoaster
- Ferris wheel
- Drop Tower

== List of amusement rides ==
| Year | Name(s) | Image | Type | Notes |
|---|---|---|---|---|
| 1898 | Aeriocycle | | | The Aeriocycle, or Giant See Saw, has two ferris wheels on both sides of a swinging arm. It originated at the Tennessee Centennial Exposition, and moved to the Pan-American Exposition before moving to Coney Island's Steeplechase Park. |
| 1954 | Ali Baba | | Pendulum ride | The Ali Baba is a type of amusement ride consisting of a stationary horizontal gondola with a 360 degree swinging pendulum. |
| 1961 | Alpine slide | | | A summer toboggan is an amusement or recreational ride which uses a bobsled-like sled or cart to run down a track usually built on the side of a hill. There are two main types: an Alpine coaster or mountain coaster is a type of roller coaster where the sled runs on rails and is not able to leave the tracks, whereas with an Alpine slide the sled simply runs on a smooth concave track usually made of metal, concrete or fibreglass. Both of these types of ride are sometimes denoted with the German name Sommerrodelbahn. |
| 1949 | Arrow Flight (Antique Cars) | | | First produced by Arrow Development, Cars are guided along a track on an electric ground rail. Versions at Disneyland and Knotts Berry Farm would follow in the 1950s, raising the ride's popularity. |
| 1948 | Balloon Race | | | The Zamperla Balloon Race is a tilting, circular motion amusement park ride manufactured by Antonio Zamperla S.p.A. The ride makes its way up a structure, and at a certain height, it starts tilting. |
| 1908 | Barrel of Love | | | Also known as a Jolly Tube and Barrels of Fun, the amusement first appeared at Steeplechase Park |
| 1965 | Bayern Kurve | | | The Bayern Kurve is a roller coaster like amusement ride that moves a train around a banked circular track, gaining speed as the ride progresses. It is made in both a portable and park model and originally debuted in 1965. It was invented by German engineer Anton Schwarzkopf. |
| 1952 | Booster (Fabbri) | | Pendulum ride | Booster in an amusement ride made by Fabbri. |
| 1998 | Booster (HUSS) | | | The Booster is an amusement park ride made originally by HUSS Maschinenfabrik starting in 1998. |
| 1985 | Breakdance | | | Breakdance is an amusement ride designed by Huss Maschinenfabrik GmbH & Co. KG in 1985. |
| 1972 | Bumper boats | | Water ride | Bumper boats are an amusement park ride that uses inner tube shaped watercraft that can be steered by the rider. Some are driven by electric motors, some by gasoline engines, and some require the rider to propel the craft by pedaling. Most are equipped with water guns for duels with other riders. Bumper boat attractions can commonly be found in places such as amusement parks, carnivals, fairs, family fun centers, and theme parks. |
| 1939 | Bubble bounce | | | First opened in Euclid Beach Park in 1939. Renamed the Tip Top when manufactured by Frank Hrubetz & Company in 1965. A rotating main platform circles several tubs that can be spun by the rider. |
| 1920s | Bumper cars | | Dodgems | Bumper cars or dodgems are the generic names for a type of flat amusement ride consisting of multiple small electrically powered cars which draw power from the floor or ceiling, and which are turned on and off remotely by an operator. They are also known as bumping cars, dodging cars and dashing cars. The first patent for them was filed in 1921. |
| 1909 | Cakewalk | | | Walkways move up and down with the intent of keeping the people on it off-balance and throwing them into each other. |
| 1960 | Calypso | | | Made it's North American debut at Century 21 Exposition in 1962. |
| Late 1600s | Carousel | | Merry-Go-Round | A carousel is a type of amusement ride consisting of a rotating circular platform with seats for riders. The "seats" are traditionally in the form of rows of wooden horses or other animals mounted on posts, many of which are moved up and down by gears to simulate galloping, to the accompaniment of looped circus music. |
| 1922 | Caterpillar | | | The Caterpillar ride is a vintage flat ride engineered by the inventor Hyla F. Maynes of North Tonawanda, New York, that seems to have been first operated by the Johnny Jones Exposition traveling show in 1922. It generates a significant amount of centrifugal force, causing the riders on the inside of the seats to crush the riders on the outside of the seats. It was once found at nearly every amusement park around the United States, but is now very rare. |
| 1996 | Chaos | | | |
| 1954 | Cliffhanger | | | The Cliff Hanger is an amusement park rider that is meant to simulate hang gliding. |
| 1984 | Condor | | | The Condor is the trade name of an amusement ride sold by HUSS of Bremen, Germany. It was debuted at the 1984 New Orleans World's Fair, under the name "Cyclo Tower". |
| 1993 | Crazy Bus | | | |
| 2003 | Disk'O | | | The Disk'O (also known as Skater or Surf's Up) is a type of flat ride manufactured by Zamperla of Italy. The ride is a larger version of a Rockin' Tug, also manufactured by Zamperla. |
| 1907 | Devil's wheel | | | |
| 1943 | Double Shot | | Drop tower | a drop tower that drops riders down at high speeds |
| 1972 | Enterprise | | | |
| 1992 | Evolution | | pendulum ride | |
| 1980 | Explorer | | | |
| 1893 | Ferris wheel | | | |
| 1972 | Fireball | | | |
| 1989 | Flight Trainer | | | |
| 1982 | Flying Carpet | | | Also known as a Magic Carpet, the most famous is 1001 Nacht. |
| 1959 | Flying Coaster | | | |
| 1935 | Flying Scooters | | | |
| 1948 | Fly-O-Plane | | | |
| 1953 | Freak out | | Pendulum ride | |
| 1982 | Freefall | | Drop tower | riders freefall at a high speeds |
| 1994 | Frisbee | | Pendulum ride | |
| 1900 | Funhouse | | | |
| 1954 | Fun Slide | | | |
| 1983 | Gravitron | | | |
| 1954 | Gyro tower | | | |
| 1999 | Happy Swing | | | |
| 1893 | Haunted swing | | | A haunted swing is a vintage amusement ride that creates the illusion of apparent motion by independently rotating the room around a swinging platform. |
| | Hayride | | | |
| 1905 | Helter skelter | | | |
| 1940s | Hurricane | | | |
| 1960s | Infinity | | Pendulum ride | |
| 1950s | Inversion | | Pendulum ride | |
| 1950s | Jump and Smile | | | |
| 1984 | Kamikaze | | Pendulum ride | |
| 1940s | Kiddie Boat Ride | | Kiddie ride | Manufactured by Allan Herschell Company after WWII. Based on roundabout. |
| 1930 | Kiddie ride | | | A kiddie ride is a child-sized, themed, mildly interactive coin-operated ride that can be ridden by young children for amusement. |
| 1980s | Lazy river | | Water ride | |
| 1963 | Log flume | | Water ride | |
| 1942 | Looper/Rok'n'Rol | | | Originated in 1942 and made by the Herschell Company, The Looper was renamed the Rok'n'Rol when produced by Chance Rides. The Looper featured two seats in the gondolas where riders can flip the gondola by engaging a pedal. The Rok'n'Rol featured four seats, and the flipping was controlled by the ride operator. |
| 1982 | Looping Starship | | Pendulum ride | |
| 1952 | Loop Fighter | | Pendulum ride | |
| 1933 | Loop-O-Plane | | | |
| 1933 | Loop-the-Loop | | | |
| 1929 | Madhouse | | Dark ride | |
| 1989 | Magic | | Flat ride | |
| 2007 | Magic Bikes | | Flat ride | |
| 1926 | Matterhorn | | | |
| 1930s | Mechanical bull | | | |
| 1982 | Miami | | Thrill ride | |
| 1996 | Mixer | | | |
| 1977 | Monster | | | |
| 1986 | Motion simulator | | | |
| 1954 | Music Express | | | |
| 1952 | Octopus | | | |
| 1895 | Old Mill | | Water ride | |
| 1968 | Omnimover | | | |
| 1976 | Orbiter | | | |
| 1937 | Parachute Tower | | | First Parachute Tower was Pair-O-Chutes in Riverview Park in Chicago. Most famous is the Parachute Jump at the 1939 World's Fair, which was moved to Coney Island. |
| 1957 | Paratrooper | | | |
| c.1893 | Pirate Ship | | Pendulum ride | |
| 1999 | Power Surge | | | |
| 1983 | Rainbow | | | |
| 1981 | Ranger | | Pendulum ride | |
| 1971 | Red Baron | | | |
| c.1978 | Reverse bungee | | | |
| 1956 | River caves | | Water ride | |
| 1980 | River rapids ride | | Water ride | |
| 1978 | Rockin' Tug | | | |
| 1948 | Rock-O-Plane | | | |
| 1974 | Rockstar | | Pendulum ride | |
| 1700s | Roller coaster | | | The roller coaster is an amusement ride developed for amusement parks and modern theme parks. LaMarcus Adna Thompson obtained a patent regarding roller coasters on January 20, 1885, which were made out of wood, but this patent is considerably later than the "Russian mountains" described in the article. |
| 2013 | Rollglider | | | The Rollglider is a type of a thrill amusement ride that has a steel pipe track designed with turns, dips and loops, using gravity-propelled trolleys to slide down the track. |
| 1970s | Roll-O-Plane | | | |
| 1940s | Rotor | | | The Rotor is an amusement ride designed and patented by German engineer Ernst Hoffmeister in 1948. The ride was first demonstrated at Oktoberfest 1949 and still appears in numerous amusement parks. The Rotor is a large, upright barrel, rotated to create an inward acting centripetal force supplied by the wall's support force. Once at full speed, the floor is retraced, leaving the riders stuck to the wall of the drum. |
| 1954 | Roto Jets | | | Also just referred to as Jets. Kiddie version is Junior Jets. |
| 1990s | Rotoshake | | Pendulum ride | |
| 1940s | Round Up | | | |
| 1938 | Scrambler | | Flat ride | |
| 2004 | Screamin' Swing | | Pendulum ride | A larger version of the Happy Swing. |
| 1884 | Shoot the Chute | | Water ride | |
| 2016 | Sidecar | | Flat ride | |
| 2003 | Sky Swatter | | | |
| 1992 | Skycoaster | | | |
| 1965 | Skydiver | | | |
| 2012 | Sky Fly | | Flat Ride | A ride that has an arm that spins carrying suspended riders. The riders can flip themself using the wings on each side of the seat. |
| 2009 | Sky Roller | | Flat Ride | |
| 1963 | Sky Wheel | | | The Skywheel is a ride that is essentially a double Ferris Wheel with each wheel attached on each end of a large boom that rotates on its axis causing the wheels to rise and fall while rotating independently as they rotate around the boom axis causing a gravitational thrill more spectacular than a normal Ferris Wheel. The ride was constructed by now defunct company Allan Herschell Company. |
| 1891 | Somers' Roundabout | | Flat Ride | A wooden precursor to the Ferris wheel. |
| 1996 | Space Shot | | Drop tower | |
| 2000 | Speed | | Pendulum ride | |
| 1940s | Star Flyer | | Swing ride | |
| 1897 | Steeplechase Ride | | | |
| 1955 | Super Shot | | Drop tower | |
| 1996 | Super Star | | | |
| 1960 | Swing Around | | | |
| 1830s | Swing boat | | Pendulum ride | |
| 1951 | Tagada | | | |
| 1948 | Teacups | | | Originally called the Cuddle Up when it debuted in 1948 at Rocky Point Park, the ride would become very popular after a teacup variation appeared at Disneyland in 1955. Similar to the Crazy Daisy. |
| 1914 | The Whip | | | |
| 1926 | Tilt-A-Whirl | | | |
| 1996 | Top Scan | | | |
| 1990 | Top Spin | | | |
| 2002 | Topple Tower | | Pendulum ride | |
| 1955 | Tornado (Mondial) | | | |
| 1951 | Tornado (Wisdom) | | | |
| 1944 | Tow boat ride | | Water ride | |
| 1963 | Trabant | | | Also known as the Satellite and Hully Gully. |
| Late 1800s | Train ride | | | |
| 1977 | Tri-Star | | Flat ride | |
| 1970s | Troika | | Flat ride | |
| 1930s | Tumble Bug | | | |
| 1970 | Turbo | | | |
| 1950s | Turbo Drop | | Drop tower | |
| 2011 | Twist 'n' Splash | | | A Teacups variant with water elements. Two models exist, Twist 'n' Splash produced by Mack Rides and Watermania produced by Zamperla. |
| 1978 | UFO | | | |
| 1957 | UltraMax | | | |
| 1933 | Waltzer | | | |
| 2015 | Windstarz | | | |
| 1963 | Wipeout | | | |
| 1907 | Witching Waves | | | Witching Waves is a historical flat ride that propels light cars using waves created in its flexible metal oval track by levers underneath that rise and fall in sequence. |
| 1968 | Zipper | | | |
| 2001 | Downdraft | | | |

== Literature ==
- Florian Dering: Volksbelustigungen. Eine bildreiche Kulturgeschichte von den Fahr-, Belustigungs- und Geschicklichkeitsgeschäften der Schausteller vom achtzehnten Jahrhundert bis zur Gegenwart. Greno, Nördlingen 1986, ISBN 3-89190-005-8.
- Karl Ruisinger: Kirmes Special. Karussells 1950er und 1960er Jahre (= Kirmes Special 1). Gemi Verlag, Reichertshausen 2005, ISBN 3-9808913-3-X.
- Sacha-Roger Szabo: Rausch und Rummel. Attraktionen auf Jahrmärkten und in Vergnügungsparks. Eine soziologische Kulturgeschichte. transcript-Verlag, Bielefeld 2006, ISBN 3-89942-566-9 (Zugleich: Freiburg, Univ., Diss., 2006).
