= Rock-O-Plane =

Amusement park ride

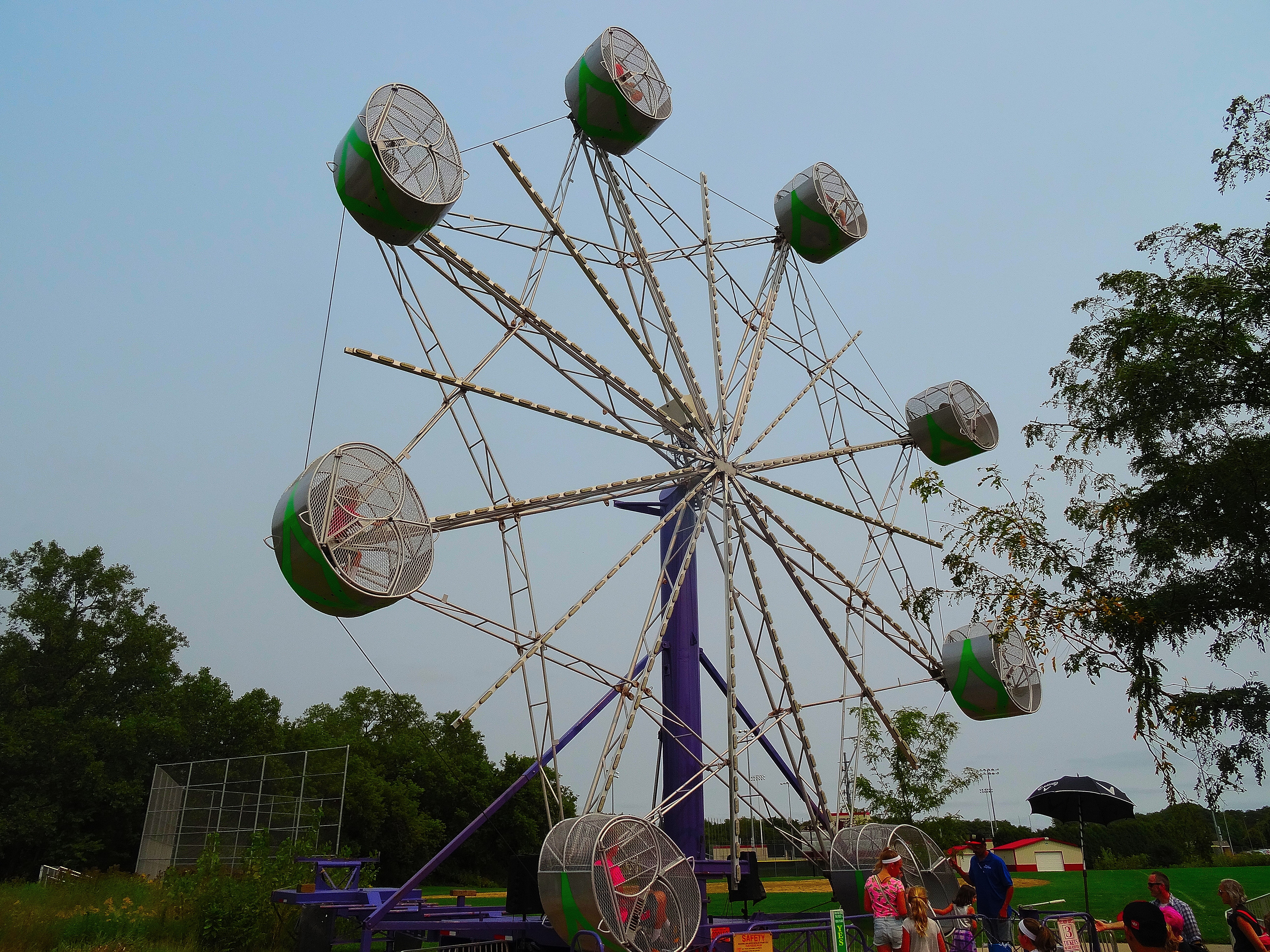
- Rock-O-Plane ride
- Status: Discontinued
- First manufactured: 1948
- Manufacturer: Eyerly Aircraft Company
- Designer: Lee Eyerly
- Capacity: 16 riders per hour
- Vehicles: 8
- Riders per vehicle: 2

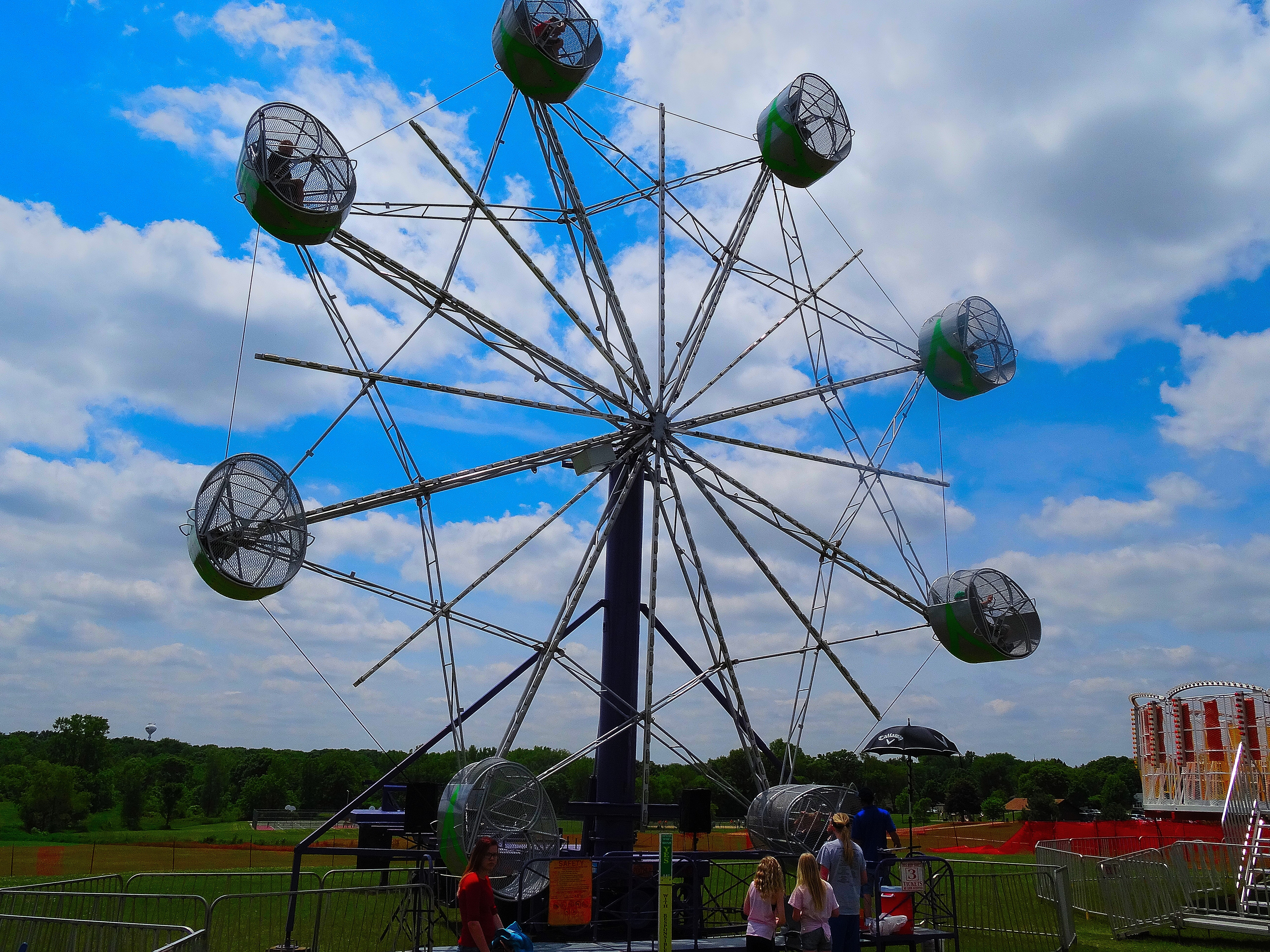
Rock-O-Plane at Hometown Days in Verona, Wisconsin

The Rock-O-Plane is an amusement park ride designed by Lee Eyerly in 1948 and manufactured by the Eyerly Aircraft Company of Salem, Oregon.

It is sometimes nicknamed "the cages" or "the eggs". Its shape is similar to that of a Ferris wheel, but with seats that are enclosed and rock and roll as the ride rotates. If the rocking builds sufficient momentum, the seats will flip upside-down and roll end-over-end. There is usually a manual hand wheel inside that the riders can use to lock the seat and prevent it from rocking. This can be used to make the ride less scary by ensuring that the seats do not rock too much; or to make it more intense by locking the seats at crucial points in the ride's revolution, causing the seats to flip upside down and spin erratically. The minimum rider height requirement is 36 inches.

In the UK, many of these fairground rides are still travelling, and most were imported from the US in the 1980s. Some of these traveling examples have had their standard 'egg' shaped cages replaced with front-facing open cars. These rides are known as "Sky Dancer", "Hi Impact", "The Cages", or sometimes colloquially as an "Egg Roller".

In 2026, American manufacturer Battech Industries announced a revival of the Rock-O-Plane, with production resuming to complete the first one in September 2027. The design will remain intact with minor improvements made, although the original cable-driven mechanism is set to be retained.

This ride can be found in various amusement parks throughout North America including:

- Santa Cruz Beach Boardwalk in Santa Cruz, California
- All Star Adventures in Wichita, Kansas
- Arnolds Park Amusement Park in Arnolds Park, Iowa
- Enchanted Forest Water Safari in Old Forge, New York
- Lakeside Amusement Park in Lakeside, Colorado
- Lagoon in Farmington, Utah
- Oaks Amusement Park in Portland, Oregon
- Sylvan Beach Amusement Park in Sylvan Beach, New York
- Thomas Amusements in Newfoundland and Labrador, Canada
- Knoebels Amusement Resort in Elysburg, Pennsylvania

== Incident ==
In 2016, the door of one of the cages opened on the ride at the Morton Pumpkin Festival but no one was hurt .

== See also ==
- Loop-O-Plane
- Roll-O-Plane
