= Bulgy the Whale =

Children's amusement ride model

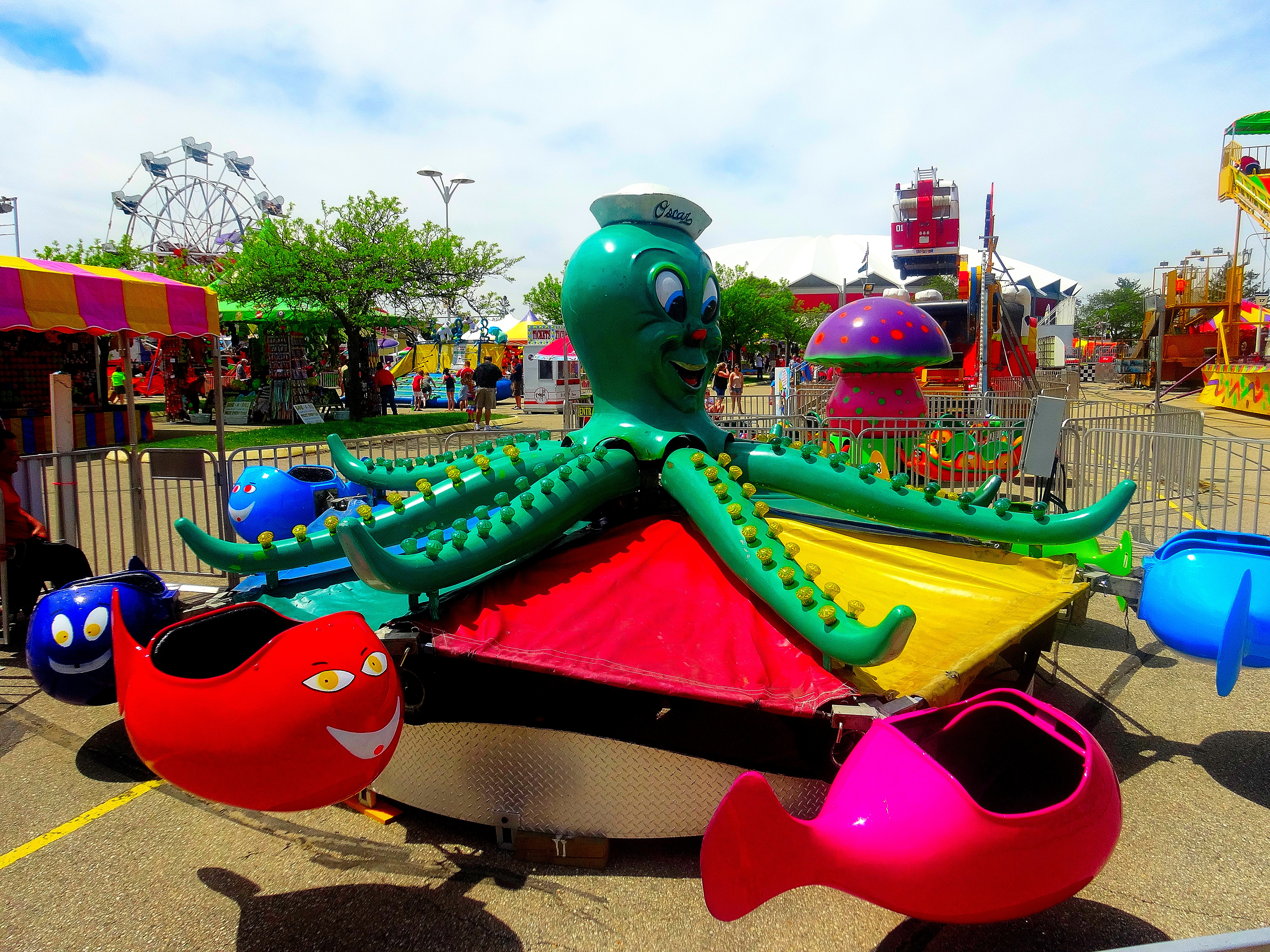
- Status: Discontinued
- First manufactured: 1948
- Manufacturer: Eyerly Aircraft Company
- Designer: Johnny Waters
- Capacity: 8 riders per hour
- Vehicles: 8
- Riders per vehicle: 1

Bulgy the Whale is a children's amusement ride manufactured by Eyerly Aircraft Company. It consists of eight whale-shaped ride vehicles traveling in a counter-clockwise rotation, similar to a carousel, while traveling up and down small hills. Although the Eyerly Aircraft Company ceased operation in the 1980s, there are still several Bulgy the Whale rides in operation. Some have had their whales repainted to resemble fish instead of whales, and others have had thematic pieces added, but the general operation and idea remains the same.

== Installations ==
Below is a partial list of Bulgy the Whale attractions.

Name	Park	Open	Closed	Details	Ref
Freddie the Fish	Arnolds Park		Open		
Unknown	Beverly Park		Closed		
Clown Fish	Deggeller Attractions, Inc. (Showman)		Open	Has whales painted like clown fish.	
Whales	DelGrosso's Amusement Park		Open		
Bulgy the Goldfish	Gilroy Gardens		Open		
Dancer's Fish	Holiday World & Splashin' Safari		Open	Formerly called Salmon Run. Relocated for 2014 season.	
Clown Fish	James H. Drew Exposition (Showman)		Open	Has whales painted like clown fish.	
Unknown	Joyland Amusement Park		Closed		
Bulgy the Whale	Lagoon	1956	Open		
Willie the Whale	Michael's Amusements (Showman)		Open		
Bulgy the Whale	Santa Cruz Beach Boardwalk		Open		
Bulgy the Whale	Skerbeck Family Carnival (Showman)		Open	Includes large octopus decoration on top of attraction.	
Bulgy the Whale	Tinkertown		Open		
Bulgy the Whale	Wade Shows (Showman)		Open	Includes large octopus decoration on top of attraction.	
Bulgy the Whale	West Coast Amusements (Showman)		Open		
Guppies	Wyandot Lake		2006		
