= Octopus (ride) =

Amusement ride shaped like an octopus

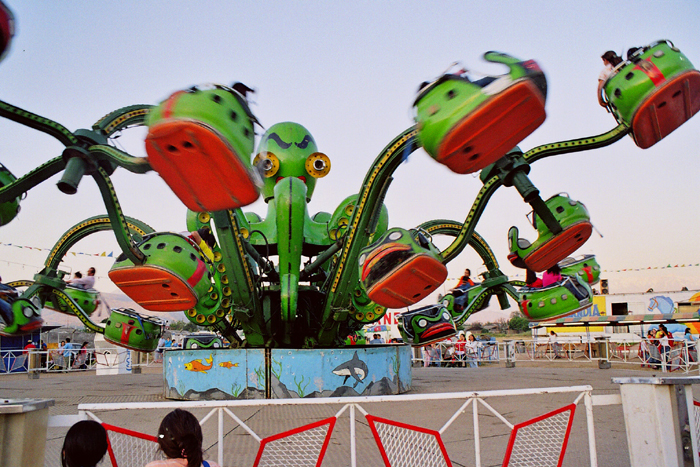
El Pulpo at Parque Diversiones in 2008

The Octopus is a type of amusement ride with a shape inspired by an octopus. Five to eight arms attached to a central axis of rotation move up and down in a wavelike motion via a counter rotating eccentric, while cars at the end of the arms, either attached directly to the arm or fixed on spinning crosses, spin freely or stay in place, depending on the exact type of ride. Each Octopus ride has the arms attached the middle of the ride. Most Octopus rides require guests to be at least 42 inches (1.1 m) to ride without an adult; smaller children must have an adult who meets the height requirement with them.

== Different types of Octopus rides ==
There are many different kinds of Octopus rides. They include:

- Eyerly Octopus — The original Octopus ride variant. This variant, built by the Eyerly Aircraft Company of Oregon, has eight arms, with one car attached to each arm. As the arms turn, they move up and down, and the cars can spin freely. The arms, much like the other Eyerly designs, have a fixed height at each point of the rotation, and cannot be lowered for loading. This means that the operator must load the ride one car at a time, advancing the ride to bring each arm in succession to the place where the arm is at ground level.
- Eyerly Spider — This ride is similar to the Octopus, but with only six arms, each of which has two cars on a spinning crossbar.

The Octopus and the Monster are two different ride models. The Octopus has eight arms with either one or two seats at the ends, and the Spider, which is an offshoot of the Octopus, has six arms with two seats at the end of each arm. The Monster has six arms, but has four seats on the end. In both ride models, the rotating arms are operated by electric motors where the seats are connected.

== Ride locations ==
These are not exhaustive lists.

=== Current ===
- Spider (Eyerly Spider) – Bill Hames Amusements (traveling)
- Spider (Eyerly Spider) – Camden Park - Huntington, West Virginia
- Octopus (Eyerly Octopus) – Conneaut Lake Park - Conneaut Lake, Pennsylvania
- Spider (Eyerly Spider) – Elitch Gardens Theme Park - Denver, Colorado
- Spider (Eyerly Spider) – Evans Midland Empire Shows (traveling)
- Octopus (Eyerly Octopus) – Funland Amusement Park - Idaho Falls, Idaho
- Octopus (Eyerly Octopus) – Great American Shows (traveling)
- Octopus (Eyerly Octopus) – Hydro Free Fair - Hydro, Oklahoma
- Spider (Eyerly Spider) – Idlewild and Soak Zone - Ligionier, Pennsylvania
- Spider (Eyerly Spider) – Lakeside Amusement Park - Lakeside, Colorado
- Spider (Eyerly Spider) – Luna Park, Melbourne - Melbourne, Australia
- Spider (Eyerly Spider) – North American Midway Entertainment - Farmland, Indiana
- El Pulpo (Eyerly Spider) – Parque Diversiones - San José, Costa Rica
- Spider (Eyerly Spider) – River City Carnival (traveling)
- Octopus (Vortex) – Riverside County Fair and National Date Festival - Indio, California
- Spider (Eyerly Spider) – Shooting Star Amusements (traveling)
- Spider (Eyerly Spider) – South Florida Fair - West Palm Beach, Florida
- Spider (Eyerly Spider) – Tom Evans United Shows (traveling)
- Spider (Eyerly Spider) – The Terrortorium Haunted House & Amusements - Oxford, Alabama (formerly at Waldameer & Water World in Erie, Pennsylvania)

=== Former ===
- Spider (Eyerly Spider) – Bell's Amusement Park - Tulsa, Oklahoma
- Tarantula (Eyerly Spider) – Frontier Village - San Jose, California. Operated from 1975 until the park's closure in 1980.
- Black Squid/Black Widow/The Spider (Eyerly Octopus) – Geauga Lake - Aurora, Ohio. Operated from 1970 until the amusement park's closure in 2007. It was relocated to Kings Dominion in Doswell, Virginia but was in too poor of condition to be reassembled.
- Spider (Eyerly Spider) – Lakeside Amusement Park - Lakeside, Colorado. Removed in 2016.
- Spider (Eyerly Spider) Neverland Ranch - Santa Barbara, California (formerly at Michigan's Adventure in Muskegon, Michigan)
- Spider (Eyerly Spider) – Rocky Glen Park - Moosic, Pennsylvania. Operated in the 1970s.
- Octopus (Eyerly Octopus) – Worlds of Fun - Kansas City, Missouri. Removed in 2014 due to unavailability of spare parts.

== See also ==
- Monster (ride)

== External Videos ==
- One of the first Schwarzkopf Monster IIIs
- SDC Polyp

== Manufacturer Site ==
- Sartori Rides
- Emiliana Luna Park srl (ITALY)
