= Monster (ride) =

Amusement ride

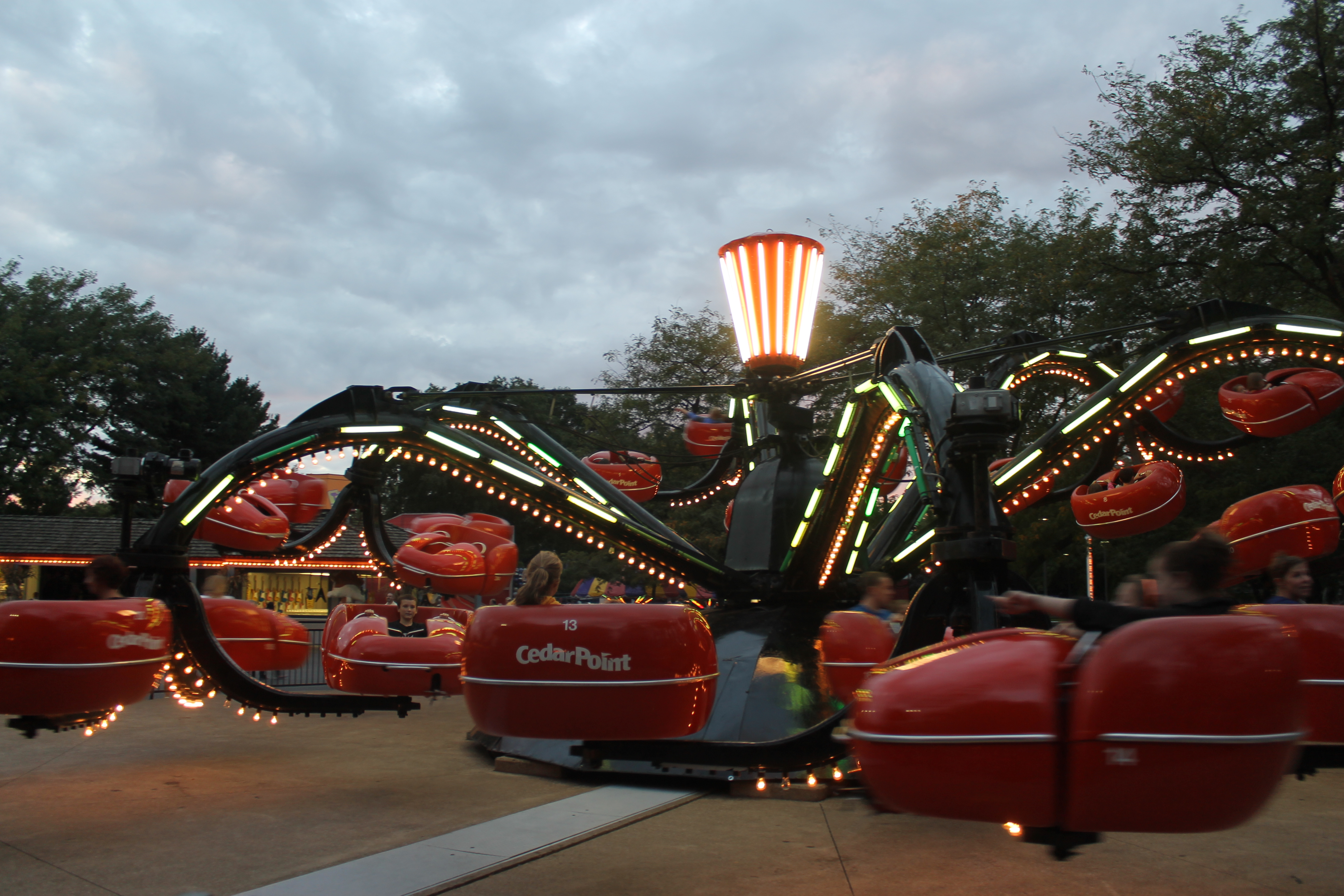
- Monster at Cedar Point in 2012
- Status: Discontinued
- Manufacturer: Eyerly Aircraft Company
- Vehicles: 24
- Riders per vehicle: 1
- Capacity: 24

The Monster is an amusement ride model manufactured by Eyerly Aircraft Company. The ride spins while moving up and down at a slow pace. Each car spins independently while large connecting arms move up and down in a circular motion. Riders may experience the feeling of weightlessness when going in the air and coming back down to ground level.

== Different types of Monster rides ==
There are many different kinds of Monster rides. They include:

- Eyerly Monster — The original ride model.
- Klaus (S.D.C.) Polyp — Originally built in the 1960s by Klaus of Germany, this ride has five arms, with four cars attached to a spinning cross at the end of each arm. This variation of the Octopus differs from the Eyerly version in two key ways: the cars do not spin freely because they are attached to the side of the cross arm, and the operator can lower all the arms at once for loading, allowing all cars to be loaded simultaneously. Although the Klaus rides are not common, the design found moderate success in western Europe, with the most common manufacturers of these attractions being Bakker and CAH, both of the Netherlands.
- Schwarzkopf Monster — This popular variant built by Schwarzkopf of Germany is similar to the Klaus Polyp, but its cars are able to spin freely on the cross, rather than being attached to the side. The ride has five arms, with either four or five cars attached to each arm. There have been three different models of Monster built by Schwarzkopf (with the most popular being the Monster III), but they all function the same. Sartori of Italy also makes a similar ride.
- Looping/Suspended Polyp — Originally designed by Wieland Schwarzkopf (son of Anton Schwarzkopf), the Looping Polyp was similar to the Monster, but featured cars that could flip over as well as spin. The cars were also suspended below the crosses, rather than above. The prototype ride, called Sound Factory and built for German showman Kinzler in 1997, was the only Looping Polyp ever built, as the ride was plagued by mechanical issues and was pulled out of service just a couple years later. In the late 2010s, Gerstlauer replaced the original looping cars with spinning cars for showman Aigner, who renamed the ride Parkour. It currently tours various German Funfairs.

The Monster and the Octopus are two different ride models. The Monster has six arms, but has four seats on the end. The Octopus has eight arms with either one or two seats at the ends, and the Spider, which is an offshoot of the Octopus, has six arms with two seats at the end of each arm. In both ride models, the rotating arms are operated by electric motors where the seats are connected.

== Ride locations ==
Monster at Cedar Point in 2003

These are not exhaustive lists.

=== Current ===
- Monster (Eyerly Monster) – EsselWorld - Mumbai, India
- Sea Warrior (Klaus (S.D.C.) Polyp) – Indiana Beach - Monticello, Indiana. Formerly operated at Kiddieland Amusement Park in Melrose Park, Illinois and Lake Winnepesaukah in Rossville, Georgia.
- Monster (Eyerly Monster) – Kings Island - Mason, Ohio. Opened in 1972. Originally operated at Coney Island from 1969 to 1971.
- Mustekala (Schwarzkopf Monster III/Polyp) – Linnanmäki - Helsinki, Finland. Opened in 1985.
- Monstruo (Schwarzkopf Monster III) – Parque de la Ciudad - Buenos Aires, Argentina. Opened in 1983.
- Piovra (Moser's Rides Polyp) – PowerPark - South Ostrobothnia, Finland
- Lobster (Schwarzkopf Monster III) – Six Flags Great America - Gurnee, Illinois. Opened in 1976.
- Rock & Roll (Schwarzkopf Monster III/Polyp) – Six Flags México - Mexico City, Mexico. Opened in 2000.
- Monster (Eyerly Monster) – Valleyfair - Shakopee, Minnesota. Opened in 1977.

=== Former ===
- Lobster (Eyerly Monster) – California's Great America - Santa Clara, California. Operated from 1976 to the early 1990s.
- Shiva's Fury/Fury (Eyerly Monster) – Canada's Wonderland - Vaughan, Canada. Operated from 1981 to 2003 and was replaced by Time Warp.
- Witch Doctor/Black Widow (Eyerly Monster) – Carowinds - Charlotte, North Carolina. Operated from 1973 to 1987 and was replaced by the Cinema 180 Theater.
- Monster (Eyerly Monster) – Cedar Point - Sandusky, Ohio. Originally opened in 1970, and was refurbished and relocated within the park for the 2014 season. It closed following the 2025 season.
- Monster (Eyerly Monster) – Dorney Park & Wildwater Kingdom - Dorneyville, Pennsylvania. Originally operated from 1995 to 1997, but was removed to make way for Dominator. Returned in 2000 in a new location within the park. Removed after the 2023 season.
- Monster (Eyerly Monster) – Hersheypark - Hershey, Pennsylvania. Operated from 1972 to 1983.
- Monongahela Monster (Eyerly Monster) – Kennywood - West Mifflin, Pennsylvania. Operated from 1979 to 1989 and was replaced by Swing Around.
- Bad Apple (Eyerly Monster) – Kings Dominion - Doswell, Virginia. Operated from 1975 to 1988.
- Monster (Eyerly Monster) – Lakemont Park - Altoona, Pennsylvania. Removed in 2010 due to rising maintenance costs.
- Monster (Eyerly Monster) – Lakeside Amusement Park - Lakeside, Colorado. Removed in 1986.
- Monster! (Eyerly Monster) – Pleasure Beach Resort - Blackpool, England. Operated from 1968 to 1995 and was replaced by Launch Pad.
- Monster (Eyerly Monster) – Pontchartrain Beach - New Orleans, Louisiana. Operated until the park's closure in 1983.
- Monster (Eyerly Monster) – Rocky Glen Park - Moosic, Pennsylvania. Operated until the park's closure in 1987 and was auctioned off in August 1988.
- Monster (Eyerly Monster) – Silverwood Theme Park - Athol, Idaho. Operated from 1988 to 2004 and was replaced by Trabant.
- Black Dragon (Eyerly Monster) – Six Flags AstroWorld - Houston, Texas. Operated from 1968 to 1977 in the Oriental Village section of the park.
- Jolly Monster (Eyerly Monster) – Six Flags Magic Mountain - Valencia, California. Operated from 1973 to 1981.
- Mo-Mo the Monster (Eyerly Monster) – Six Flags Over Georgia - Mableton, Georgia. Operated from the early 1970s to the late 1980s.
- Mo-Mo the Monster (Eyerly Monster) – Mid America Adventure - Eureka, Missouri. Operated from 1973 to 1994 and was replaced by Riverview Racer.
- Monster (Eyerly Monster) – Williams Grove Amusement Park - Mechanicsburg, Pennsylvania. Closed in 2005 alongside the rest of the park and was later sold.

== See also ==
- Octopus (ride)
