= Miracle Strip at Pier Park =

Former American amusement park

- Location: 284 Powell Adams Rd, Panama City Beach, Florida, U.S.
- Status: Defunct
- Opened: March 2010
- Closed: September 21, 2015
- Owner: Miracle Strip Carousel, LLC
- Operated by: Miracle Strip at Pier Park
- Slogan: Cool Rides, Great Food, Big Fun!
- Area: Florida Panhandle

Attractions
- Total: 20

Miracle Strip at Pier Park was an amusement park in Panama City Beach, Florida, owned by Miracle Strip Carousel, LLC. The original Miracle Strip closed in 2004 after 41 years of operation, but a new amusement park using the same name was resurrected and began with moving the carousel from its original location to Pier Park in March 2009. After the success of the carousel, the few remaining rides were purchased and moved as well, opening in March 2010. This retro park reopened with a few new rides, games and food vendors on a much larger 14-acre tract on April 18, 2014. The park closed on September 21, 2015. Many of the rides permanently moved to Lake Winnepesaukah.

This site is now occupied by "Swampy Jack's Wongo Adventure".

== Rides ==
The newly built Miracle Strip Amusement Park reopened at Pier Park about 200 feet away from its original 2009 opening location in the center of Pier Park. The new location had its grand opening on April 19, 2014. The new property held about 14 acres of land filled with many attractions and rides. The ride list is as follows:

- 1964 Allen Herschell Carousel
- 1985 Zamperla Balloon Race
- 1975 Eli Bridge Ferris Wheel
- 1952 Allen Herschell Red Baron
- 1975 Eli Bridge Scrambler
- 1991 Sellner Tilt-a-Whirl
- 1980 Chance Sea Dragon
- 1949 Allen Herschell Car Ride
- 1969 Allen Herschell Boat Ride
- 1978 Zamperla Tea Cups
- 1937 Jolly Caterpillar
- 1969 Swing Sharks
- 1966 Chance Trabant
- 1975 Eyerly Rock O Planes
- 1968 Eyerly Bullet
- 1970 SDC Galaxi Coaster (RipTide)
- 1966 Floyd & Baxter Bumper Cars
- Kiddie Bumper Boats
- Kiddie Trackless Train
- Double Zipline

Along with these rides, there were other various activities such as batting cages, a Butterfly Pavilion, remote-control tug boats, and a Rainbow Umbrella Bridge.
