= Roll-O-Plane =

Amusement park ride

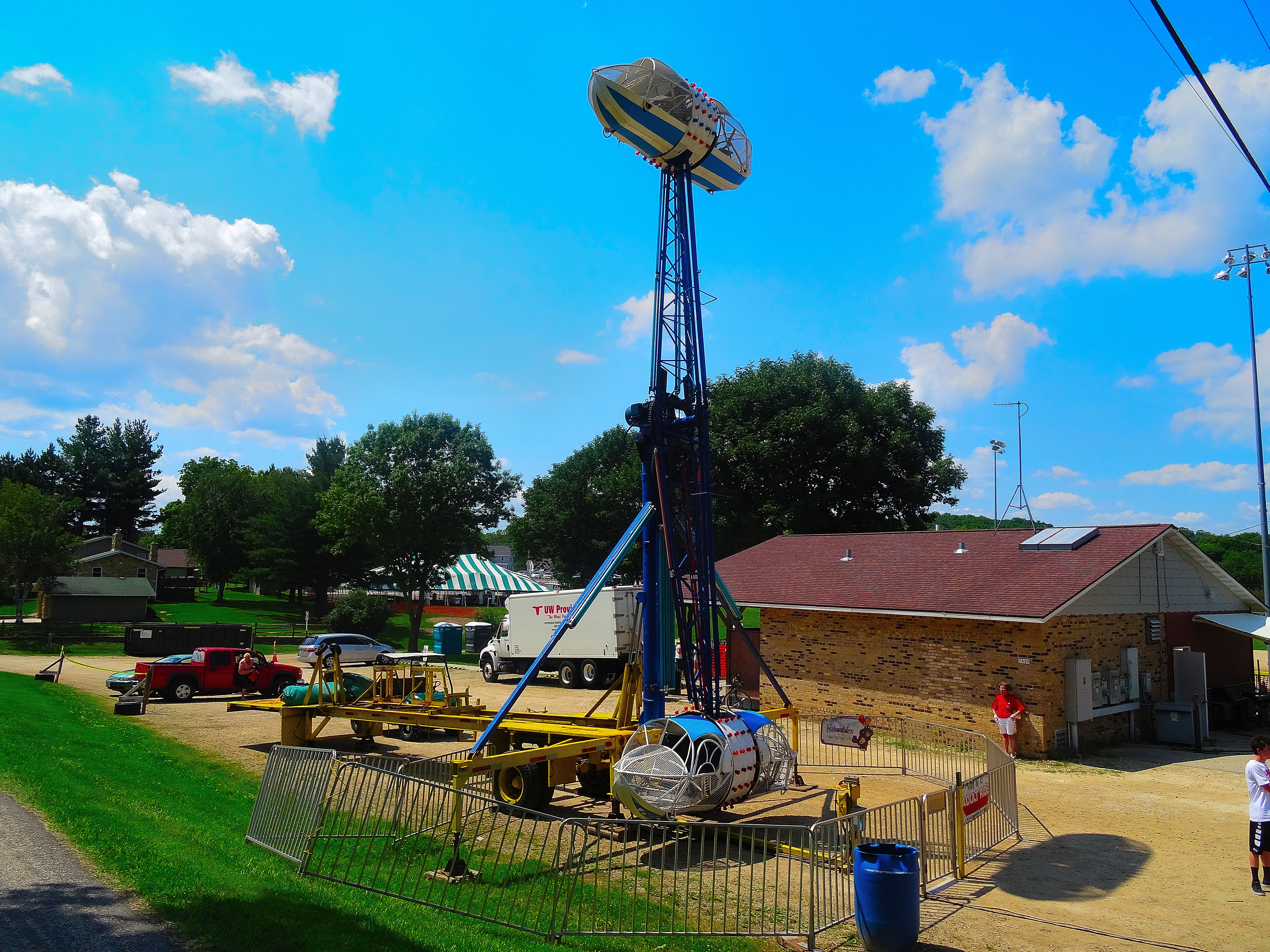
- Roll-O-Plane at a Fair
- Status: Discontinued
- Manufacturer: Eyerly Aircraft Company
- Height: 45 ft (14 m)
- Vehicles: 4
- Riders per vehicle: 2
- Capacity per cycle: Eight Riders
- Duration: variable
- Capacity per hour: 80-160
- Nickname: Salt & Pepper Shakers

The Roll-O-Plane, is an amusement park ride that originated in America. It was invented by the Eyerly Aircraft Company of Salem, Oregon, as an updated version of the Loop-O-Plane.

The ride consists of a rotating arm mounted to a pivoting hinge on a central support column. The arm has two enclosed cars (one at the top and bottom). Each car holds four riders seated in pairs facing opposite directions making the maximum capacity eight riders.

When in motion, the arm swings until it makes a complete loop, though the riders never become inverted. This is because the ride has two "twists" that the older version did not. First, the arm pivots while the ride is in motion. Second, the cars are free to rotate horizontally or "roll" while the ride is in motion, always keeping the riders right-side-up. It is based on an Immelmann turn.

This once common ride can now only be found in a handful of parks including:

- Arnolds Park Amusement Park in Arnolds Park, Iowa as the Roll-O-Plane
- Bushkill Park in Easton, Pennsylvania as the Roll-O-Plane
- Cedar Valley Amusement Park in Comins, Michigan as the Roll-O-Plane
- Knoebels Amusement Resort in Elysburg, Pennsylvania as the Satellite
- Lakeside Amusement Park in Denver, Colorado as the Roll-O-Plane
- Little Amerricka in Marshall, Wisconsin as Test Pilot
- Sylvan Beach Amusement Park in Sylvan Beach, New York as the Bomber

== See also ==
- Rock-O-Plane
- Loop-O-Plane
