= Miracle Strip Amusement Park =

Former American amusement park

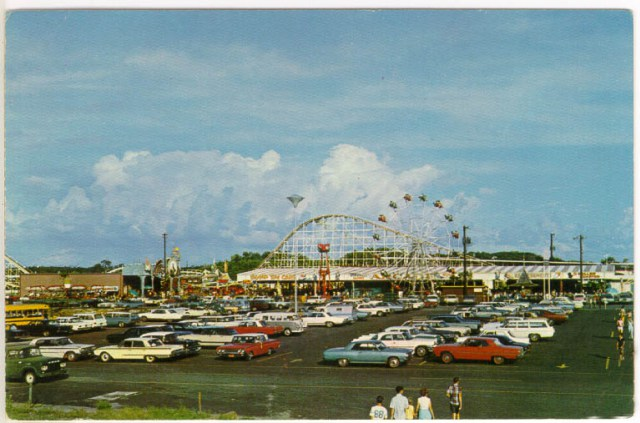
- A postcard from the 1970s showing the park.
- Interactive map of Miracle Strip Amusement Park
- Location: Panama City Beach, Florida, United States of America
- Coordinates: 30.191°N 85.825°W
- Status: Defunct
- Opened: May 25, 1963
- Closed: September 5, 2004

Attractions
- Roller coasters: 1

Miracle Strip Amusement Park was a theme park located in Panama City Beach, Florida, which operated from May 25, 1963 to September 5, 2004. The highlight of the park was Starliner, an out and back-style wooden coaster designed by John Allen upon the park's initial conception. A few other rides lay near Starliner and a small arcade center and food stands rounded out the fledgling park.

As the strip grew in popularity and Panama City Beach became more of a tourist location, the park grew as well. More and more rides were added throughout the late 1960s until the 1980s, and the park grew up around Starliner, which was by far the main draw for the park's entire run. As the city became more of a spring break hotspot, the popularity of the family friendly Miracle Strip Park decreased, though it remained a draw for families up to the 2000s.

== Opening ==
In 1963, Starliner was the first roller coaster built in Florida. Roller coasters in general were on the decline after World War II and many doubted Starliner's success. To start up the attraction, a group of Panama City Beach men (Harry Edwards, Alf Coleman, Bill Parker, Don Bennet, and Julian Bennet), spearheaded by James I. Lark Sr., created a partnership. The group took money they had pooled together at the end of 1962 and the building of Starliner began in early 1963. Don and Julian Bennet originally owned the land the coaster was built on. Because of their attribute, start-up cost was cut down tremendously.

The park opened on Memorial Day weekend of 1963 to immediate popularity. The park grew as time progressed. In the mid-1960s, Ed Nelson of Birmingham, who owned and operated a municipal park (Fair Park), left Birmingham to join the up-and-coming amusement park. Nelson owned the original arcade machines (a mix of old and new hardware) but as part of his involvement leased them out to the park. Not only did the park rent from Nelson who owned the arcade games and a few rides, but the park also rented rides from traveling carnivals at this time. Eventually the company paid off debts and the park began to grow. Some of the stockholders were bought out, and eventually the park gained the arcade games, rides, and food service. The partnership was eventually dissolved, and became owned by one family only, the Larks, who later expanded the amusement park by creating Shipwreck Island Waterpark directly across the street.

== Rides ==
The park featured several typical rides that were enhanced by placing them within domed structures and adding lighting effects, temperature changes, smoke effects and music. These included the Abomnible [sic] Snowman, Dante's Inferno and The Dungeon. There were also standard rides, such as bumper cars, a log flume, a scenic car driving attraction called Route 63, a train, a Vonroll type 101 skyride, a Wave Swinger, loop-o-plane and the stand-outs; Starliner Roller Coaster and O2 Tower. The park was also dotted with multiple kiddie rides. Another ride, a bobsled ride called Bayern Kurve, was like the Musik Express, but each car carried two passengers, one sitting in front of the other one.

| Ride | Info | Year | Description |
|---|---|---|---|
| Starliner | a wooden roller coaster designed by John Allen of the Philadelphia Toboggan Company in 1963. | 1963 | Starliner was one of the first attractions on Miracle Strip Park and lasted from its conception to its closing. The ride was a wooden roller coaster designed by John Allen of the Philadelphia Toboggan Company in 1963. The coaster was the focal point of the park, running for almost the entire length of the rectangular strip that comprised it. Starliner was visible from any point in Miracle Strip and the nearby roadways. The trains were three bench PTC rolling stock with a single seat belt for both riders per cart and a single-locking lap bar. After the operator disengaged the manual brake system, the train left the station and began the 70-foot climb up the lift hill. The initial drop was 65 feet and gave way to several smaller hills, the third of which took riders through a tunnel painted like a dragon (as if entering its mouth). Riders were often caught off guard as a bunny hop was located halfway through the dark tunnel, allowing for some airtime. After the tunnel, the track looped around and hugged the previously-traveled track, over several more bunny hops for more airtime, before moving into the boarding station again, where a red light and bell signaled the end of the ride. |
| Abominable Snowman | Eli Bridge Scrambler | | This was a typical Eli Bridge Scrambler placed inside a massive igloo-shaped dome with a menacing abominable snowman guarding the door, whose legs you had to pass under to gain entry. Inside the dome was a dark, smoky atmosphere and cool temperature, a welcome break from the summer heat outside. The walls were lined with mirrors as well. Once all riders were secure, one operator would retreat to the control booth to control the lights and music while the other operator would operate the ride. As the scrambler sped up, the lighting effects would begin, complete with multiple-colored flashing lights, disco effects and strobes. Originally the ride mechanics were stripped from the building, leaving the Snowman and its building in ruins for years. As of May 2015 the old Miracle Strip property has been cleared and overgrown with grass and weeds. A similar Scrambler was put at Miracle Strip at Pier Park without the dome. |
| Dante's Inferno | Chance Rides Trabant | | After walking into the mouth of a devil, riders found themselves within a dome housing a Chance Trabant. Much like the Abominable Snowman, the dome was lined with multiple lighting effects including rows of flashing white lights, red lights and strobes. Loud music would play as the ride began to spin and tilt. After a few minutes, the Trabant would level out, and the operator would exclaim that the ride would now go backwards, complete with the ominous sound of screeching brakes as the ride halted before reversing. Once the Park closed in time the ride was removed from the building only leaving its structure behind. Before the park's clearing of all structures, the park experienced a large amount of vandalism. Dante's Inferno received a portion of this. |
| The Dungeon | | | After walking through a section of sharply-turning tunnels decorated with spider webs, riders found themselves within a dome housing a Sellner Tilt-A-Whirl, complete with spider motif. Much like the other dome rides above, loud music would play and various colored lights and strobes would flash as the ride spun around, sometimes in complete darkness. A similar ride was bought and added to the new Miracle Strip at Pier Park, though it was no longer enclosed within a dome. |
| The Shockwave | Far Fabbri Kamikaze model | 1992 | This ride had caged seats and shoulder restraints that started slowly moving riders back and forth, finally building up enough speed to send the arms of the ride full circle, sending riders upside down both forward and backward. It was shipped to Australia in 2005 and was brought by Sydney's Better Amusement Hire. The ride was then sold in 2007 to Queensland's Flaherty Family Amusements who currently operate this ride. |
| The Musik Express | Mack Musik Express | 1973 | A fast-spinning ride with a 1970s motif. The g-forces pushed riders up against each other. Loud music would play as the ride spun around at high speeds. The Musik Express also ran backwards, but it was deemed unsafe in the 1990s, and operators were only allowed to run it forward (clockwise). Many small flashing lights accentuated the outside, drawing in riders. It is now at Cliff's Amusement Park in Albuquerque, New Mexico. |
| The Haunted Castle | Built By Bill Tracy | 1965 | A campy haunted house ride shaped like a castle with a dead tree outside of it that ran two-seater cars through a maze of track showing off several morbid attractions; the electrocution of a dummy inmate, dismemberment, spiders and many blacklight effects. The ride even had a second floor with a break-away girder as the cars passed over, visible from the outside to give those in line get a little fright themselves. It originally had a dragon facade and a clock with a 13 hand. It demolished in September 2009, but a group of anonymous enthusiasts purchased the elements of this ride and moved them to a location where they were able to recreate the dark ride and run it for annual Halloween events. This same group is currently in the process of selling it to a party in Oxford, Alabama as "The Terrortorium", where it will have a more seasonal permanent setup. This same attraction would also be the annual Christmas theme park "Santa's Wonderland of Lights and Amusements". |
| The Train | | | A small multi-passenger diesel-engine train ride that took riders from the station roughly in the center of the park around a few attractions, such as the paratrooper, spider, dungeon, log flume, shockwave and blue tornado and through a tunnel. This then led into the wooded area where the park was never developed before looping back to the station. |
| The Paratrooper | | | A spinning, tilting ride that was shaped to look like parachutes. The ride was located in-between the bumper cars and the Abominable Snowman ride, next to a coin operated chicken and duck exhibit wherein the animals performed tricks for food provided when visitors put money in the various window box coin slots. This ride is now at Fun Spot in Atlanta, Georgia. |
| The Blue Thunder | A Mack Matterhorn Himalaya-type ride | | Spun quickly forward and then backward and had a massive sound system. The carts were individually mounted on hanging bars rather than sitting flat on the ride floor like the Musik Express. This ride also pushed riders in the same carts together with g-forces. It was originally known as HeadAche at Knott's Berry Farm in Buena Park, California. |
| Zierer Wave Swinger | | | A massive swing ride that rose into the sky after riders were strapped into their swings and tilted to one side as it spun riders in a wide arch. This ride was known for its typically long running time. It is owned by Powers Great American Midways |
| The Bullet | Loop-O-Plane | 1968 | Much like the Shockwave but on a smaller and faster scale. This ride was also decidedly more comfortable than the Shockwave, though it lacked any unusual lighting effects. An updated version of this ride existed at the Pier Park location operated from 2010 to 2015. |
| Sea Dragon | | | A large ride shaped like a Viking boat decorated with shields and a dragon head that swung back and forth, gaining momentum until it tilted riders vertically both forward and backwards. It is like the one at the new Miracle Strip in Pier Park. This ride currently operates as "Pirate" at Lake Winnepesaukah in Rossville, Georgia. |
| Big Eli Ferris Wheel | | | A large Ferris wheel situated not far from the park's main entrance. It was a standard wheel with neon lighting effects. Up until 1999, it was run by the original motor (using a lever to adjust the speed and to slow it down) and the operator had to manually raise the platform by standing on a different lever. This sometimes made it difficult to control the Ferris wheel because it became out of balance. However, before the 2000 season, the motor was replaced. The lever which controlled the Ferris wheel was replaced by a toggle switch. The platform was also replaced with a new platform that only required a push of a button. It is now at Lake Winnepesaukah in Rossville, Georgia. |
| The Log Flume | | | This was a typical log flume that started riders in a docking area made to look like a mill, complete with working mill wheel. The log-shaped carts would move slowly around a bend and take a long ride to the top of the first of two large hills. After the initial drop, the log flume would send riders along a rapid-like series of turns before pulling the cart up the second, much larger hill. The drop from this hill would end with a huge splash that often got riders quite wet (especially those seated in the back). The carts would then pull back into the station for disembarking. |
| The O2 Tower | S&S Space Shot Turbo Drop | March 2002 | The O2 Tower attraction was a more recent addition to the park in March 2002. It was a 185-foot S&S Space Shot Turbo Drop combo tower that rocketed 12 riders up to the top for a panoramic view of the 27 miles of beach front property, before dropping them at high speed again into a soft landing. The ride cost about $2 million. It then operated as Hot Shot at Dixie Landin' Amusement Park in Baton Rouge, Louisiana. Now it operates as Space Mission Orbit at Movieland Park in Italy. |

=== Starliner post closure ===
==== November 10, 2006 (Cypress Gardens) ====
Kent Buescher, president of Adventure Parks Group LLC, announced he's reaching into the past to help boost attendance at Cypress Gardens Adventure Park. Buescher said he plans to add Starliner, which was Florida's first roller coaster and was originally built in 1963 for the Miracle Strip Amusement Park in Panama City Beach. It will be the sixth roller coaster to the park. "We could not think of a more fitting place to salvage a major coaster than to bring it to Cypress Gardens and reintroduce it to a whole new generation," Buescher said.

It will be rebuilt at the park and brought up to safety standards, he said. Plans are to open it in late June or early July, with 2,640 feet (800 m) of hills and valleys. Buescher estimated the total cost at $5 million.

The ride operated at Cypress Gardens for two years, and the ride closed with the park's theme park attractions in November 2008. It was the oldest roller coaster in Florida at the time. When Starliner closed at Cypress Gardens, Space Mountain became the oldest operating roller coaster in Florida.^{[1]}

== Other attractions ==
Miracle Strip boasted several other attractions, including an arcade center with various games, both electronic and more standard carnival fare, like ring toss and water-pistol games for prizes. There were multiple food and drink stands throughout the park as well and smaller versions of some of the bigger rides for children. Bumper cars, a large carousel and smaller Ferris wheel rides were also available. There was also a stage area where live shows were often scheduled near the bumper cars.

Some attractions also came and went. A spinning ride called The Spider once stood near the Dungeon and followed its spider motif, but it was later replaced by a kiddie parachute ride. There was also at one point a walk-through haunted house called "Old House". It featured spooky decor, ghostly silhouettes and teetering hallways. Employed theatrical actors were entirely absent from this attraction. It was demolished and replaced by the Blue Thunder in 1999. Vincent E. Valentine II designed this attraction in 1967. After "Old House" dismantled, the flashing skeletal ghost mannequin identified as "Jones" was taken to the Rootin' Tootin' Shootin' gallery, where he would have a precise shot from a rifle and mechanically rise from a grave with a weak mid-1990s "Don't Do Drugs" message strapped to his bones. It is now outside Lake Winnepesaukah in Chattanooga, Tennessee. With not enough interest in this shooting gallery at Lake Winnie, it was dismantled and stored away in a shelter at the parks maintenance shop. The former "Old House" attraction currently stands simply as Haunted Mansion in Panama City Beach's larger amusement park, Race City. It lasts from March through Halloween. This attraction previously operated as the fairy tale-themed attraction "Fantastic Funhouse". An almost exact replica of "Old House" is the "Mysterious Mansion" in Gatlinburg, Tennessee. Another creation of Valentine, it contains many similar features like secret passages, dropping balconies, and also a flashing skeleton similar to the one at "Old House." The "Mysterious Mansion" was built in 1980 and is still in operation despite being threatened by the wildfire that came so close to destroying downtown Gatlinburg in November, 2016. Several of the kiddie rides from Miracle Strip are here, the bees, a children's ride, and several of the rides that were under the metal building in Panama City Beach are now at Lake Winnie.

There was another ride called "Bayern Kurve" located originally where the Wave Swinger sat, then in the late 1970s, it was moved next to the train depot. During the mid to late 1970s, a steel Galaxi coaster named the "Crazy Mouse" stood right next to the "Old House".

== Demise ==
In 2004, it was announced that the 2004 season would be Miracle Strip's last. The owner sold the land for use in the development of condos (which were slated to be called "Miracle Condominiums"). He cited a general lack of interest in the preceding years from tourists, loss of money and increased expenses in keeping the rides running. The final season ended on September 5, 2004. Many rides were sold or simply disappeared, but others remained, slowly decaying. The log flume was taken apart and moved to Wild Adventures Park in Valdosta, Georgia. It was slated to open as the Shaka Zulu Water Ride in late 2006, but never opened to the visitors.

The Carousel was moved to Pier Park in April 2009, and appropriately named "The Miracle Strip Carousel". Its location was in the short-lived built Miracle Strip at Pier Park.

The powered tracked Sports Cars were moved to Lake Compounce in Bristol, Connecticut and reopened in 2007 as Zoomer's Gas-N-Go.

According to the cover story in the September 7, 2009 edition of the Panama City News Herald, the remains of The Miracle Strip Amusement park would be either removed from the site to be sold, or demolished. This was scheduled to start on Thursday, September 10.

By 2010, the few remaining standing structures at the park had been demolished. The only remains of the park are sidewalks, concrete barriers, foundations and the main thoroughfare, which is overgrown with weeds.
