= Loop-O-Plane =

Amusement ride

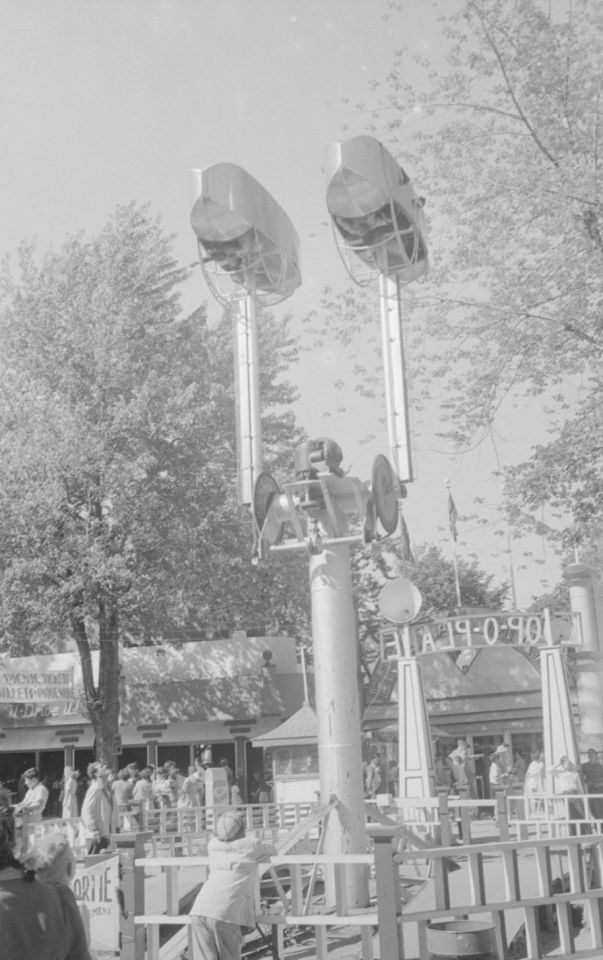
- Loop-O-Plane ride in Belmont Park, Quebec.
- First manufactured: 1933
- Manufacturer: Eyerly Aircraft Company
- Designer: Lee Eyerly
- Vehicles: 2
- Riders per vehicle: 4
- Restraint Style: Lap bar
- Nickname: Hammers / clogs
- Capacity: Eight riders

The Loop-O-Plane is an amusement park ride that originated in America. It was invented by Lee Eyerly and manufactured by the Eyerly Aircraft Company of Salem, Oregon, in 1933. The ride was immediately popular with customers and became a staple of amusement parks.

The ride was imported into Europe, where it was first used in the UK in 1937.

The ride has two 16-foot-long arms, each with an enclosed car at one end and a counterweight at the other. Each car holds four riders seated in pairs facing opposite directions making the maximum occupancy eight riders. Propelled by an electric motor, the arms swing in directions opposite to each other until they 'loop' taking the riders upside down. The minimum rider height requirement is 46 inches tall.

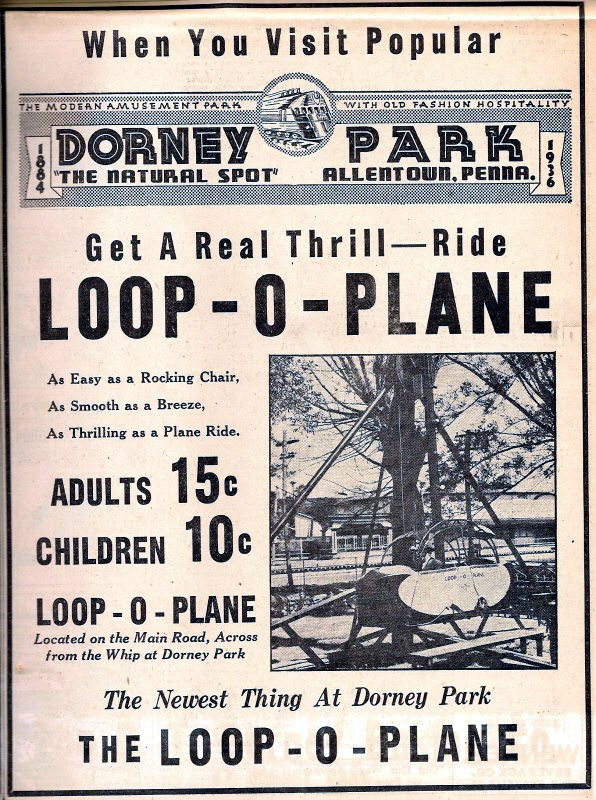
An advertisement for the Loop-O-Plane in Dorney park.

An updated version of this ride exists known as the Roll-O-Plane. Some of the surviving machines were also converted into a variation named Rock-O-Plane.

== Ride locations ==
A partial list containing both open and closed rides and their locations follows.

- Green Machine (Eylerly Loop-O-Plane) - Hydro Free Fair- Hydro, Oklahoma
- Loop-O-Plane - Keansburg Amusement Park, Keansburg, New Jersey
- Loop-O-Plane - Idora Park - Youngstown, Ohio
- Loop-O-Plane - Kennywood - West Mifflin, Pennsylvania
- Loop-O-Plane - Lagoon - Farmington, Utah
- Loop-O-Plane - Lakeside Amusement Park - Lakeside, Colorado
- Loop-O-Plane - Waldameer & Water World - Erie, Pennsylvania
- Bullet - Miracle Strip Amusement Park - Panama City Beach, Florida
