= Scrambler (ride) =

Type of amusement ride

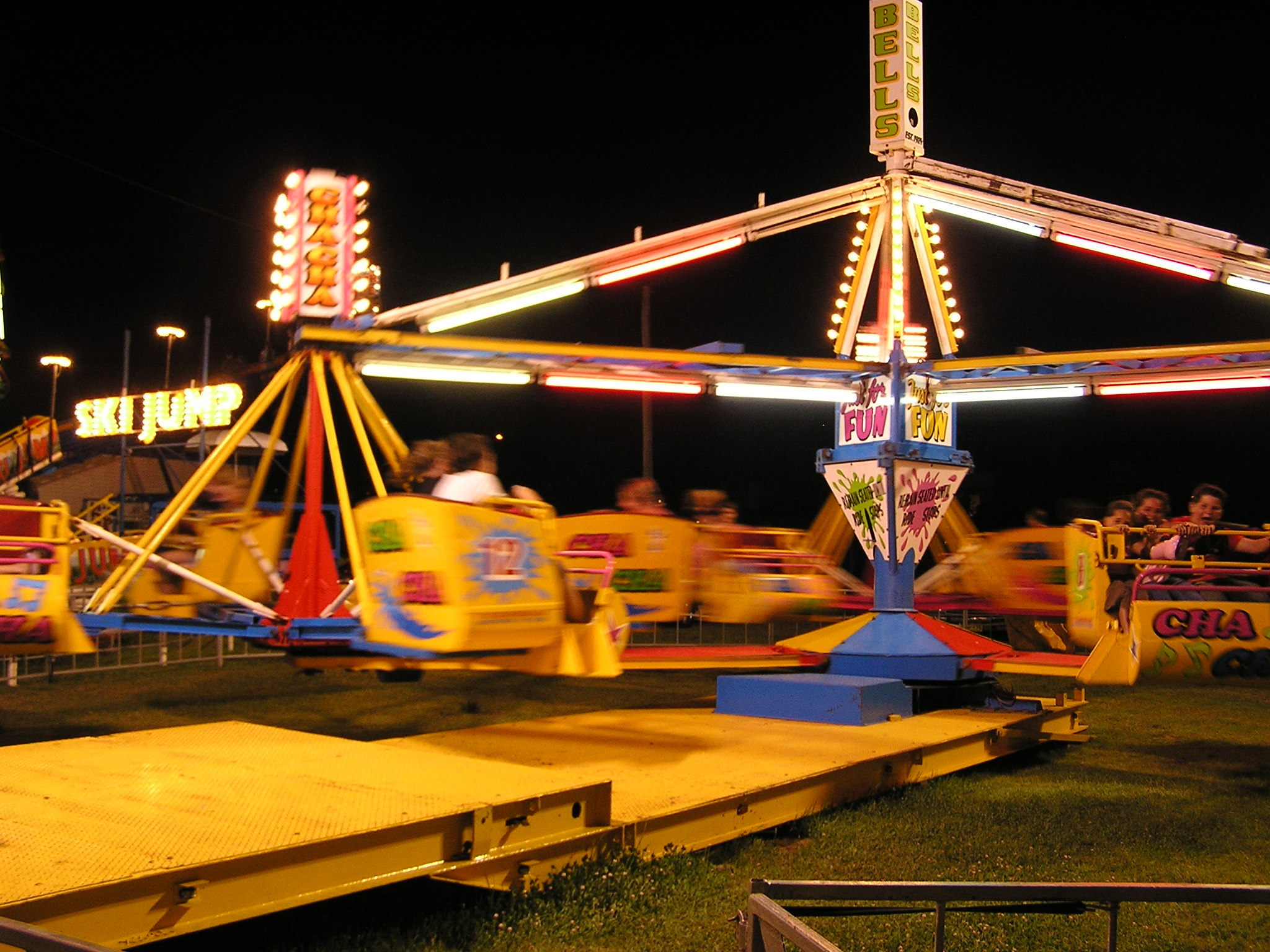
Cha Cha scrambler ride at Batemans Bay, New South Wales, Australia

The Scrambler, Twist (in the UK), Twister, Cha Cha (in Australia), Sizzler, or Merry Mixer is an amusement ride in which suspended riders spinning in cars experience centrifugal force, while spinning along two separate axes. Riders are seated in small carriages clustered together and connected by beams at the top to a central point. The clustered vehicles are spun in one direction, while the ride as a whole spins in the opposite direction. The design has a number of variations.

== History ==
In 1938 (88 years ago), the first scrambler was invented by Richard Harris of Georgia and installed at Lakewood Fairgrounds. Two additional rides were built and sold in the following two years.

In 1941, Harris was granted a U.S. patent for the design, which was then acquired or licensed by the Eli Bridge Company.

In late 1953, the Eli Bridge Company road-tested its Scrambler ride, and sold the first five over the next year, by the end of 1954. The original ride had a total of 12 cars distributed among its three arms with a capacity of 24 adults or 36 children. The entire ride rotated clockwise at 9–12 revolutions per minute.

At the 1955 Florida State Fair, The Eli Bridge Scrambler had one of its first major showings, where it grossed US$1,700, at 25 cents a ride, in a single day (equivalent to $20,000 in 2025 at $3 a ride), raising interest among many additional potential buyers.

In 1959, the rides first appeared in the UK, when they were manufactured by Edwin Hall under license from the Eli Bridge Company.

In 1979, rides manufactured by Eli Bridge directly began to be imported.

== Variants ==
=== Grasscutter ===
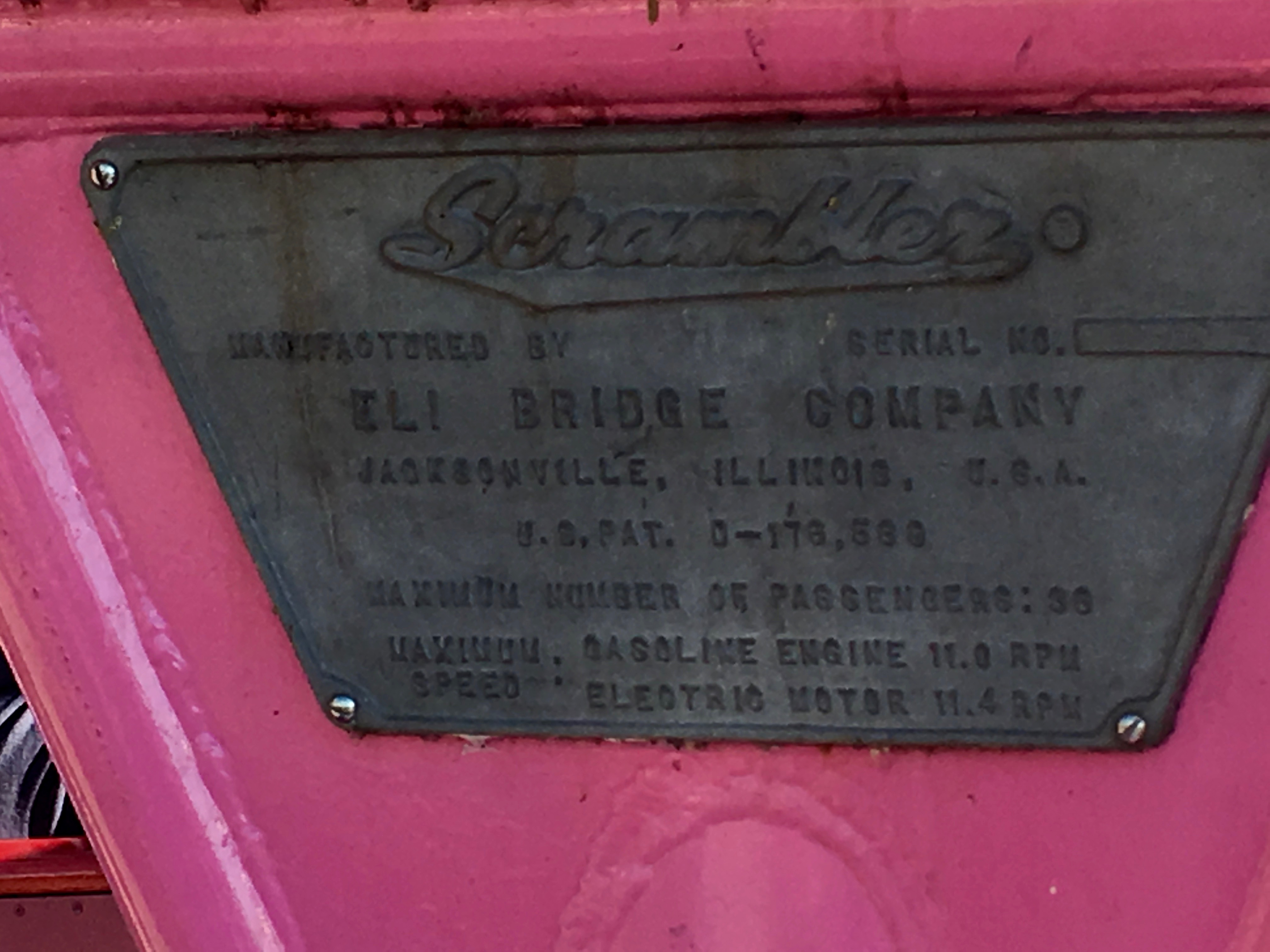
Manufacturing tablet for the Atomic Scrambler at Cedar Point, manufactured by the Eli Bridge Company.

A grasscutter scrambler has a basic frame shape and no platform and is driven by a lower arm assembly. This type of ride is extremely popular in the United States.

- Scrambler—These rides usually have a circular structure near the top of the ride. There are vertical bars that go around the top along with lights on them. For the most part, these rides are made by the Eli Bridge Company.
- Wisdom's Sizzler—This ride does not have a platform, but it still has thick arms at the top and bottom of each seating assembly. The top of the ride has 3 twisted metal structures. There are also lights all over the ride including the cars. These are popular in the US, but are no longer made by Wisdom.

=== Sizzler ===
A Sizzler is a ride that has thicker arms and a platform. When this type of ride was first manufactured, the manufacturers concentrated on the ride aesthetics. Concerns have been raised about its safety, however, as Sizzler rides have been involved in at least six fatalities since 1997.

- Bennett & Pollards — These rides have a smaller circumference from the center of the ride to the seats. They are similar to Eli Bridge Scrambler rides because they also have cylinder structures on top of the ride.
- PWS Sizzler, Sonacase Twister, & Twist — These rides each have a platform, but they do not have objects near the top of the ride such as a cylinder structure. There are lights all around the center structure of the ride. Thus, these rides look similar.
- Wisdom's Family Sizzler — this ride has thick arms and a platform, along with a central structure with dazzling lights. It has wheels to guide the three pods along underneath, and is quite fast when compared to a Grasscutter-type ride. They are found mostly at indoor fun centers and are the only type of Sizzler being made by Wisdom.
- Wisdom's Super Sizzler — This ride has a platform, and it looks similar to the Sizzler. Another difference is that it goes backwards, and this ride also has a backdrop with some colorful art.

=== Gee Whizzer ===
The 'Gee Whizzer' derivative was constructed and commissioned by the operators King Carnival amusements of Tasmania, Australia during the 1950s. The project was carried out by rail engineers who utilized rail and tram parts that were common for the era. This machine is currently the largest and fastest of the variants utilizing a unique fully suspended balanced single sweep arm design, driven from the top resulting in no lower arm assembly. The center support core is fully independent and does not require a support deck; instead, eight extended stabilizers are fitted to the core during assembly. Only one of these machines is known to still be in existence.

=== Cyclone ===
A Cyclone, also known as a Lifting Twist, manufactured by ARM UK, has very much the same function and appearance as a normal Sizzler, except that the centre structure begins to lift with the cars once it reaches up to normal speed until it reaches above the fence level, where it remains for the duration of the ride. They are considerably fast when they reach full speed, although they normally slow down first so riders can brace for the full speed. After the full speed part is over, the centre structure begins to lower back to platform level as the ride slows down to a stop. Only three of these Cyclones currently exist in the world.

== Installations ==
Name	Location	Manufacturer	Opened	Closed	Details
Pharaoh's Fury	Adventure Island			Open	
Road Runner Scrambler	Adventure Park USA (Monrovia, Maryland)	Eli Bridge Company		Open	
Scrambler	Adventureland (Iowa)	Eli Bridge Company	1974	Open	Relocated within the park in 1993 and again in 2011. Previously known as Bavarian Scrambler and Wrangler.
Scrambler	Alabama Splash Adventure	Eli Bridge Company	2003	Open	Originally operated 2003 through 2011, then reopened in 2018. Unknown whether the current unit is the same as the previous one or a replacement.
Scrambler Big Eli	America's Incredible Pizza Company (Memphis)	Eli Bridge Company		Open	
Scrambler	Amusements of America (Showman)	Eli Bridge Company		Open	Traveling model.
Scrambler	Arnolds Park	Eli Bridge Company		Open	
Cyclone	Barry's Amusements	Edwin Hall	2001	Closed	
Scrambler	Bay Beach Amusement Park	Eli Bridge Company	1977	Open	
Sizzler	Beech Bend Park		2015	Open	Replaced former model that opened in 2000
Scramble Ride	Bell's Amusement Park	Eli Bridge Company		Closed	
Scrambler	Belle City Amusements (Showman)	Eli Bridge Company		Open	
Scrambler	Big Amusements (Showman)	Eli Bridge Company		Open	
Jambalaya	Blue Bayou and Dixie Landin'	Eli Bridge Company		Open	
Scrambler	Boardwalk Amusements (Daytona Beach, Florida)	Eli Bridge Company		Closed	
Unknown	Boblo Island Amusement Park	Eli Bridge Company		Closed	
Flying Twist	Botton's Pleasure Beach, Skegness			Open	
Scrambler	Bowcraft Amusement Park	Eli Bridge Company		Closed	
Sizzler	Brean Leisure Park			Closed	
Scrambler	Buckroe Beach Amusement Park (Hampton, Virginia)	Eli Bridge Company		Closed	
Le Catapult	Busch Gardens Williamsburg	Eli Bridge Company		Open	
Haywire	Butler Amusements (Showman)	Eli Bridge Company		Open	
Scrambler (1)	Butler Amusements (Showman)	Eli Bridge Company		Open	
Scrambler (2)	Butler Amusements (Showman)	Eli Bridge Company		Open	
Scrambler (3)	Butler Amusements (Showman)	Eli Bridge Company		Open	
Scrambler (4)	Butler Amusements (Showman)	Eli Bridge Company		Open	
Scrambler	C&L Shows (Showman)	Eli Bridge Company		Open	
Industrial Revolution	California's Great America	Eli Bridge Company		Closed	Previously known as Saskatchewan Scrambler.
Liberty Twirler	California's Great America	Eli Bridge Company	2022	Open	
Scrambler	Camden Park	Eli Bridge Company		Open	
Scrambler	Campy's Blue Star Amusements (Showman)	Eli Bridge Company		Open	
Psychodrome	Canobie Lake Park	Eli Bridge Company	1989	Open	Enclosed.
Scrambler	Carousel Gardens Amusement Park	Eli Bridge Company		Open	
Scrambler	Carowinds	Eli Bridge Company	1973	Open	Previously known as Kaleidoscope
Centrifuge	Casino Pier	Eli Bridge Company	2019	Open	Returning in 2019; original model destroyed by Hurricane Sandy
Scrambler	Castle Park	Eli Bridge Company		Open	
Atomic Scrambler	Cedar Point	Eli Bridge Company	1960	Open	Serial number ends in -73, suggesting that original 1960 version was replaced with a 1973 unit at some point.
Scrambler	Centreville Amusement Park	Eli Bridge Company		Open	
Twister	Clacton Pier			Open	
Twister	Clarence Pier			Open	
Scrambler	Clementon Amusement Park	Eli Bridge Company	2019	Open	
Scrambler	Cliff's Amusement Park	Eli Bridge Company		Closed	
Scrambler	Coney Island (Cincinnati, Ohio)	Eli Bridge Company	1957	Closed	Closed 1959 or later. 10-year-old boy fell from ride and was struck and killed in August 1957.
Scrambler	Coney Island (Cincinnati, Ohio)	Eli Bridge Company	1969	1971	Relocated to Kings Island in 1972.
Scrambler	Coney Island (Cincinnati, Ohio)	Eli Bridge Company	1991	2019	Originally manufactured 1957. After park closed, ride was listed for sale on Rides4U.com for $29,000.
Ultimate Trip, The	Conneaut Lake Park	Eli Bridge Company	2004	Closed	Enclosed in park's former fun house building.
Scrambler	Darien Lake		2014	Open	
Scrambler	DelGrosso's Amusement Park	Eli Bridge Company		Open	
Scrambler	Deno's Wonder Wheel Amusement Park			Closed	
Sizzler	Dizzylands Funfair - Elmer Bell (Northern Ireland)			Open	
Scrambler	Dollywood			Open	
Scrambler	Dorney Park & Wildwater Kingdom	Eli Bridge Company	1970	Open	
Cyclone Twist	Dreamland			Open	
Twister	Dunes Leisure Funfair, Mablethorpe			Open	
Scrambler	Edaville USA			Open	
Scrambler	Enchanted Forest Water Safari			Open	
Scrambler	Family Kingdom Amusement Park	Eli Bridge Company		Open	
Twister	Fantasy Island (United Kingdom)			Open	
Scrambler	Fantasy Island Amusement Park (Beach Haven, New Jersey)	Eli Bridge Company	2021	Open	Replaced a previous version of the same ride
Scrambler	Fantasy Island Amusement Park (Beach Haven, New Jersey)	Eli Bridge Company	1984	Closed	Replaced by a new version for 2021 season
Sidewinder	Frontier City	Eli Bridge Company		Open	
Scramblur	Fun Spot America (Orlando)	Eli Bridge Company		Open	
Astrosphere	Funtown Splashtown USA	Eli Bridge Company		Open	Enclosed in dome-shaped structure with speakers and disco ball attached to ride's arm. Plays song "Fire on High" by Electric Light Orchestra during ride cycle.
Scrambler	Gillian's Wonderland Pier		2024	Closed	
Blizzard Indoors	The Great Escape	Eli Bridge Company	1971	Open	Enclosed. Operated 1971 through 2004 before returning in 2013. Previously known as Chipper's Magical Mystery Tour.
Twister	Great Yarmouth Pleasure Beach			Open	
Scrambler	Hersheypark	Eli Bridge Company	1972	Open	
Scrambler	Huck Finn's Playland			Open	
Scrambler	Idlewild and Soak Zone	Eli Bridge Company		Open	
Scrambler	Indiana Beach	Eli Bridge Company	1963	Open	
Scrambler	Joyland Amusement Park (Texas)	Eli Bridge Company		Open	
Space Odyssey	Kennywood	Eli Bridge Company		Closed	Enclosed. Only operated from 1974 to 1978
Dust Devil	Rides At Adventure Cove	Eli Bridge Company		Open	Previously operated as part of Wyandot Lake as Neptune's Revenge. Serial number 273-66.
Arachnidia	Kings Dominion	Eli Bridge Company	2000	Open	Previously known as Witch Doctor & Scrambler
Scrambler	Kings Island	Eli Bridge Company	1972	Open	Relocated from Cincinnati's Coney Island, where it originally opened in 1969
Merry Mixer	Knoebels Amusement Resort	Garbrick Rides	1967	Open	
Pacific Scrambler	Knott's Berry Farm	Eli Bridge Company	2013	Open	Replaced Perilous Plunge. Surfside Gliders and Coast Rider replaced that ride too
Batidora (Mixer)	La Feria Chapultepec Mágico			Closed	
Space Scrambler	Lagoon	Eli Bridge Company	1961	Open	Has moved locations around the park various times over the years, even appearing on the south end of the midway from 1982 to 1986
Scrambler	Lake Winnepesaukah	Eli Bridge Company		Open	
Scrambler	Lakeland Orchard	Eli Bridge Company		Open	
Scrambler	Lakemont Park	Eli Bridge Company		Closed	
Scrambler	Lakeside Amusement Park	Eli Bridge Company		Open	
Scrambler	Little Amerricka			Open	
Twister	Luna Park, Scarborough, North Yorkshire			Open	
Twister	Magic City (São Paulo)			Open	
Kiddie Scrambler	Michael's Amusements (Showman)	Eli Bridge Company		Open	Child's sized version of ride.
Sizzler	Michael's Amusements (Showman)	Wisdom Mfg.		Open	
Scrambler	Michigan's Adventure	Eli Bridge Company	1975	Open	
Scrambler	Miracle Strip at Pier Park			Closed	
Scrambler	NASCAR Speedpark (Sevierville, TN)			Open	
Scrambler	Oaks Amusement Park	Eli Bridge Company		Open	
Mexican Twist	OK Corral			Open	
Sizzler	Otterbacher Shows (Showman)	Wisdom Rides		Open	
Inkie's Scrambler	Pacific Park	Eli Bridge Company		Open	
Haley's Comet	Paradise Lake	Eli Bridge Company	1981	Closed	
Black Hole	Peony Park			Closed	Enclosed with a light show that played during the ride; likely auctioned off before the park was cleared in the 1990s
Scrambler	Playland (Maryland)	Eli Bridge Company		Closed	
Kiddy Scrambler	Playland (New York)	Eli Bridge Company		Open	Child's sized version of the ride.
Scrambler	Playland (Vancouver)			Open	
Twister	Rainbow Park, Hunstanton			Open	
Scrambler	Sandspit Amusement Park			Open	
Scrambler	Sandy Lake Amusement Park			closed	
Prancer's Scrambler	Santa's Workshop (Colorado)			Open	
Swedish Scrambler	Scandia Amusements (Sacramento)	Eli Bridge Company	2015	Open	
Scrambler	Silverwood Theme Park	Eli Bridge Company		Open	
Cyclone	Six Flags America	Eli Bridge Company	1993/1994	Closed	
Runaway Rickshaws	Six Flags AstroWorld	Eli Bridge Company	1968	closed	Originally opened as "The Happening". Relocated to Six Flags Over Texas
Scat-A-Bout	Six Flags Discovery Kingdom	Eli Bridge Company	1999	Open	
Waverunner	Six Flags Fiesta Texas		1994	Open	
The Scrambler	Six Flags Great Adventure	Eli Bridge Company	2012	Open	Relocated from American Adventures in Georgia. Serial number 340-69 R92.
Hometown Fun Machine	Six Flags Great America	Eli Bridge Company	1976	Open	Originally opened in Yukon Territory section as Saskatchewan Scrambler. Relocated to Hometown Square in 1977.
Scrambler	Six Flags Magic Mountain		2003	Closed	Original 1970s version destroyed by a fallen tree in 2002. 2003 version relocated from Six Flags Over Texas.
Scrambler	Six Flags New England		1973	Open	
Sidewinder	Six Flags Over Texas	Eli Bridge Company	2006	Open	Original Scrambler relocated to Six Flags Magic Mountain for the 2003 season. 2006 version relocated from Six Flags AstroWorld
Shazam!	Six Flags St. Louis		1972	Open	
Scrambler	Sluggers & Putters (Canal Fulton, OH)	Eli Bridge Company		Open	
Scrambler	Smokey's Greater Shows (Showman)			Open	
Scrambler	Stricker's Grove	Eli Bridge Company		Open	
Swamp Ape	Swampy Jack's Wongo Adventure	Eli Bridge Company	2019	Open	Enclosed, with flashing lights, fog, and heavy music from various bands and artists. Pays tribute to the old Abominable Snowman ride at Miracle Strip.
Scrambler	Sylvan Beach Amusement Park	Eli Bridge Company		Open	
The Locomotion Scrambler	Traintown (Sonoma, California)			Open	
Twister	Tramore Amusements (Tramore, Waterford, Ireland)			Open	
Merry Mixer	Trimper's Rides			Open	
Scrambler	Valleyfair	Eli Bridge Company	1976	Open	
Scrambler	Waldameer & Water World	Eli Bridge Company	1964	Open	
Scrambler	Western Playland	Eli Bridge Company	2006	Open	
Whirling Wildcats	Wild Adventures	Eli Bridge Company		Open	
Scrambler	Wild Waves Theme Park			Closed	
Scrambler	Wonderland Park (Texas)	Eli Bridge Company		Open	
Scandi Scrambler	Worlds of Fun	Eli Bridge Company	1973	Open	

== See also ==
- Troika (ride)
