= Hellcat (roller coaster) =

Roller coaster at Clementon Park and Splash World

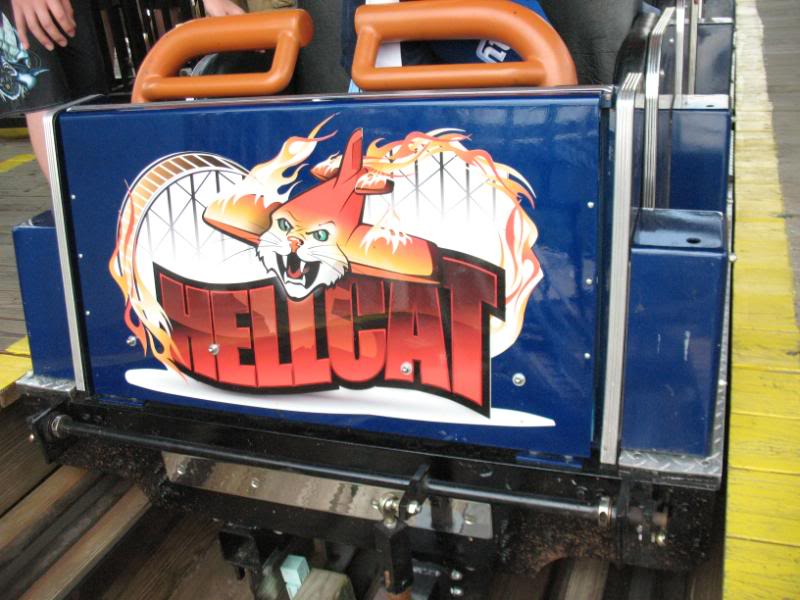

Clementon Park and Splash World
- Location: Clementon Park and Splash World
- Coordinates: 39.8020°N 74.9847°W
- Status: Closed
- Opening date: September 18, 2004
- Cost: $4,000,000 USD

General statistics
- Type: Wood
- Manufacturer: S&S – Sansei Technologies
- Model: Wooden Coaster
- Lift/launch system: Chain lift hill
- Height: 110 ft (34 m)
- Drop: 105 ft (32 m)
- Length: 2,602 ft (793 m)
- Speed: 56 mph (90 km/h)
- Inversions: 0
- Duration: 1:30
- Max vertical angle: 62°
- Height restriction: 54 in (137 cm)
- Hellcat at RCDB

Hellcat was a wooden roller coaster located at Clementon Park and Splash World in Clementon, New Jersey, United States. The hybrid coaster was built by S&S Power, and opened to the public in 2004. It was first known as Tsunami, but its name was changed to J2 in 2005, which stood for "Jack Rabbit 2", in reference to the park's former Jack Rabbit coaster, which had recently closed. The ride's name was changed for a final time to Hellcat in 2008.

The ride received retracking from Great Coasters International in 2005.

The coaster closed with the park on September 8, 2019, and reopened on June 24, 2021 after the park was acquired by IB Parks & Entertainment. It operated for the 2021 and 2022 seasons, before closing for the 2023 season. On May 9, 2025, it was announced that Rocky Mountain Construction's 208 ReTrak would be used to refurbish the ride.

In 2026, the park closed permanently, with Hellcat never having received any of the planned refurbishments.

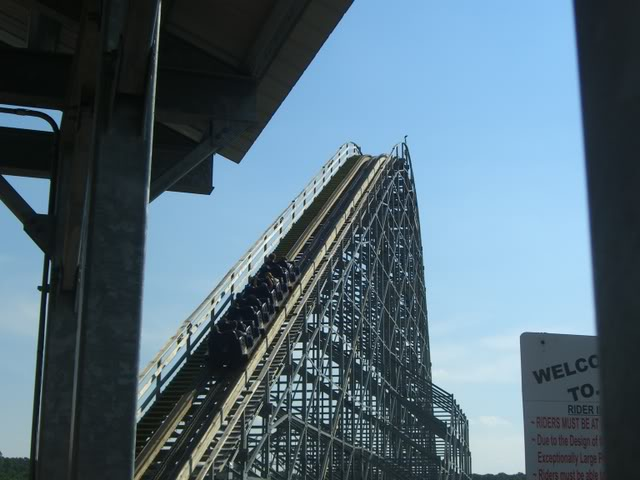
The lift hill
