= Arthur Rose Eldred =

First Eagle Scout in the United States

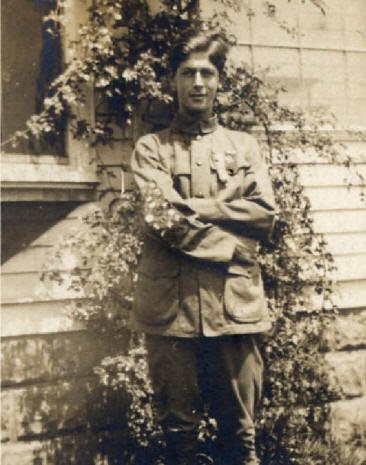
- Arthur Rose Eldred in 1912, shortly after receiving the Eagle award and his Bronze Honor medal for saving a life
- Born: August 16, 1895; Brooklyn, New York, U.S.
- Died: January 4, 1951 (aged 55); Clementon, New Jersey, U.S.
- Known for: First Eagle Scout in the Boy Scouts of America

Arthur Rose Eldred (August 16, 1895 – January 4, 1951) was an American agricultural and railroad industry executive, civic leader, and the first Eagle Scout in the Boy Scouts of America (BSA). As a 16-year-old candidate for the highest rank bestowed by the BSA, he was personally interviewed by a panel composed of the youth organization's founders, including Ernest Thompson Seton and Daniel Carter Beard. Eldred was presented the coveted distinction of Eagle Scout on September 2, 1912, becoming the first of more than two million scouts in the U.S. since then to earn Scouting's most vaunted rank. Eldred also received the Bronze Honor Medal for lifesaving and was the first of four generations of Eagle Scouts in his family.

A graduate of Cornell University, Eldred enlisted at age 22 in the United States Navy in January 1918, nine months after the U.S. entry into World War I. After serving aboard various Navy vessels and seeing combat in that conflict, he then worked in the agriculture and produce transportation industries, serving as a railroad industry official. Eldred continued as an active Scout leader and school board member throughout much of his adult life.

== Scouting as a youth ==
Arthur Eldred's Eagle Scout medal, courtesy National Scout Museum

Eldred was born in Brooklyn, New York, and raised in Oceanside, Long Island, New York, by his mother after his father died. Eldred's older brother, Hubert W. Eldred, was instrumental in starting Troop 1 of Oceanside, Long Island, New York, in November 1910. Troop 1 was fully uniformed and their appearance so impressed Chief Scout Executive James E. West that he asked the troop to serve as honor guard for the visit of Baden-Powell, the founder of Scouting. West paid the expenses for the troop to travel to New York harbor for Baden-Powell's arrival in the morning of January 31, 1912. Baden-Powell inspected Troop 1 and spoke with Eldred at some length. It is uncertain how Baden-Powell found out that Eldred's Board of Review was that afternoon, but he ended up attending it and being part of the Board of Review.

In March 1911, Eldred earned First Class rank. He subsequently completed the 21 merit badges required for Eagle Scout. Merit badges are awards for mastering skills taught in the Scouting program. At the time, only 141 merit badges had then been earned by about 50 Scouts. As originally implemented, Eagle Scout was part of the merit badge system and was not a rank. Thus, Eldred, like several of the early Eagles, did not earn the Life or Star awards that later preceded Eagle Scout. Eldred's merit badges were noted in the Honor Roll of the August 1912 edition of Boys' Life.

Eldred did not have a troop board of review, a review by the adult troop leaders to ensure eligibility. Instead, Eldred had a thorough National Board of Review consisting of West, Baden-Powell, Ernest Thompson Seton, Daniel Carter Beard, Arthur R. Forbush, and Wilbert E. Longfellow, who wrote in the Handbook for Boys on life-saving and swimming. At the time there had still not been a council-level system for Eagle Scouts boards of review. Largely due to delays caused by Baden-Powell's visit, the National Court of Honor did not convene until March 29, 1912. A press announcement was released on or about April 10, 1912, leading to a century of confusion wherein it was believed Eldred's Board of Review had been held in April. West informed Eldred of his Eagle award in a letter dated August 21, 1912. Another reason for the delays was that the Boy Scouts of America felt no one would ever earn the Eagle Scout award and at the time of Eldred's Board of Review, the Eagle Scout medal had not yet been designed. This letter also informed Eldred of the delay in the medal, caused by the fact that the design of the Eagle Scout medal had not been finalized. Eldred was presented Eagle Scout on Labor Day, September 2, 1912, becoming the first to earn Scouting's highest rank, just two years after the founding of the BSA itself.

In August 1912, Eldred was camping with the troop in Orange Lake, New York. While swimming in the lake, fifteen-year-old Melvin Daly, another Scout who was a non-swimmer, began to drown. Eldred rescued Daly with the assistance of Merritt Cutler. Chief Scout Seton presented Eldred with the Honor Medal for this action.

== Education and career ==
Eldred entered Cornell University in 1912 and graduated in 1916 having studied agriculture. At the university, Eldred was a member of the Alpha Zeta fraternity, president of the Agricultural Association and participated in track and cross-country.

=== Naval service ===
Eldred enlisted in the United States Navy in January 1918, during World War I. He was initially assigned to the Philadelphia Naval Yard before shipping out on the transport USS Henderson (AP-1) on Sunday, June 30, 1918, from Bush Terminal in Brooklyn, New York, for overseas duty. On July 1, 1918, his convoy spotted two enemy submarines and attacked them with depth charges. It is not known whether the submarines were damaged. During the Henderson's seventh troop transport voyage to France there was a fire on board on July 2, 1918, that resulted in the ship returning to the United States. All but one or two of those on board were rescued by the destroyers USS Mayrant (DD-31) and USS Paul Jones (DD-10) and eventually taken aboard the USS Von Steuben (ID-3017), which continued to Brest, France, where Eldred's knowledge of French proved useful. From there, he was sent by train to Italy.

Eldred arrived in Italy in July 1918 and eventually at Sub Chaser Base 25, located in Corfu, Greece in September 1918. There he served as a machinist aboard submarine chaser SC-244, where they patrolled the Strait of Otranto and were engaged in combat. While in Corfu, Eldred and many others got sick with the flu during the 1918 flu pandemic. The conditions at the hospital were so bad that he had to crawl to a stream to get water, which resulted in a permanent scar on his left hip. Eldred began his return to the United States and arrived in Malta on December 25, 1918. By February 1919, he was in Gibraltar. He was given the option of staying in the Navy until they arrived home in six months or being discharged and paying his own way home. He elected the discharge and was separated from the Navy on March 4, 1919. He met some U.S. Army soldiers who were en route to America aboard an Army troop ship. They took him aboard as a stowaway and loaned him an Army uniform. Eldred slept in a life boat on the way back to America.

=== Business and civic endeavors ===
After the war, Eldred worked for a dairy, then became the agricultural agent for Atlantic County, New Jersey, in 1921 and established the Atlantic City municipal market. He later promoted produce transportation for the Reading Railroad. As the trucking industry became a major competitor for the carriage of agricultural products, Eldred became the manager of the Eastern Railroad Association's Motor Carrier Committee. He also served on the Camden County Council, the Clementon School District Board of Education, and also served as Overbrook Regional school board president.

== Adult Scouting life, descendants, and legacy ==
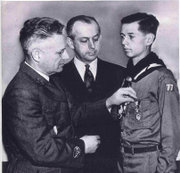
Eldred (center) looks on as son Willard ("Bill") becomes an Eagle Scout on October 27, 1944.

Eldred was a board of review examiner throughout the 1920s. He was later the troop committee chairman for Troop 77 in Clementon, New Jersey. Eldred's descendants have followed in his footsteps. Eldred was present when his eldest son, Willard "Bill" G. Eldred, had his Eagle Scout ceremony on October 27, 1944. Eldred also had a younger son, Arthur, and one daughter, Patricia. Two of Eldred's grandsons are also Eagle Scouts: James I. Hudson III (1968) and Willard "Bill" Eldred (1977). Four of his great-grandsons, Kyle Kern, Tyler Eldred, Tennessee Abbott, and Bobby Hitte, were Scouts as of March 2007, working towards Eagle Scout. Tyler Eldred and Kyle Kern did not make Eagle Scout and were no longer in Scouting as youths by July 2009. Tennessee Abbott had his Eagle Scout ceremony on May 2, 2010. Bobby Hitte became an Eagle Scout in 2012, 100 years after Arthur and another Eldred descendant, Jack Eldred, had joined Scouting.

Eldred died at the age of 55 from colon cancer on January 4, 1951, at his home in Clementon. He is buried in Berlin Cemetery, Berlin, New Jersey. The National Eagle Scout Association chapter of the BSA's Theodore Roosevelt Council in Massapequa, New York, is named in honor of Eldred. In October 1976 the Village of Rockville Centre, New York, honored Arthur Eldred by dedicating Eagle Scout Park in the village in his memory. The ceremony was attended by his widow, son Bill and grandsons.

== See also ==
- Distinguished Eagle Scout Award
- List of Eagle Scouts
