= Paradise Lake =

Paradise Lake may refer to:

Canada

- Paradise Lake (Ontario), a lake in the Township of Wellesley
- Paradise Lake (Quebec), an emerald-green lake near Matagami

New Zealand

- Paradise Lake, a lake in Canterbury

United States

- Paradise Lake, a lake in Alaska
- Paradise Lake (California), a lake of California, in Butte County
- Paradise Lake (Camas County, Idaho)
- Paradise Lake, a lake in Sardinia, New York
- Paradise Lake (amusement park), a defunct amusement park in Ohio
- Paradise Lake (Washington), in northeast King County

== See also ==
- Paradise Lakes, three small lakes in west King County, Washington, US
- Lake Paradise (disambiguation)
