= Adrenaline Family Entertainment =

American amusement park operator

Adrenaline Family Entertainment, Inc.
- Company type: Private
- Industry: Amusement park operator
- Founded: 2007
- Defunct: 2012
- Fate: Properties sold, company closed.
- Headquarters: Edmond, Oklahoma
- Key people: Larry Cochran, Chief Executive Officer; Russell Kuteman, Chief Financial Officer
- Parent: Angelo, Gordon & Co.
- Website: http://www.afeparks.com/

Adrenaline Family Entertainment, Inc. was an amusement park operator headquartered in Edmond, Oklahoma. It was created in 2007 by private equity firm Angelo, Gordon & Co. when it acquired Clementon Park in Clementon, New Jersey. The company originally had plans to expand by building a portfolio of regional amusement and water parks across the United States. Plans also included upgrades to existing facilities and addition of new rides and attractions.

Larry Cochran was the CEO until 2011 and Russell Kuteman was the CFO until the company closed. Both previously worked for Six Flags, Inc., one of the world's largest regional theme park operators.

== Past properties ==
- Alabama Adventure in Bessemer, Alabama - Sold to General Attractions, LLC. in 2012.
- Clementon Amusement Park in Clementon, New Jersey - Sold to Premier Attractions Management, LLC. in 2011.
