= Walter E. Pedersen =

American politician and businessman

Walter E Pedersen, Sr.

Member of the New Jersey House of Representatives from the 3B district
- In office 1968–1969 Serving with Leonard H. Kaser
- Preceded by: Office created
- Succeeded by: John L. Miller; Thomas J. Shusted

Personal details
- Party: Republican
- Profession: Gas station attendant, Clerk, Welder, Businessman

Walter E. Pedersen (September 15, 1911 – November 18, 1998) was an American politician and businessman.

Born in Berlin, New Jersey, Pedersen moved to Clementon, New Jersey in 1920 with his family; he graduated from Haddon Heights High School, Class of 1929. He then worked in a gas station and as a clerk for the Lehigh Railroad. During World War II, Pedersen worked as a welder for the New York Shipyard. He was in the appliance business in Clementon, and later fabricated and installed metal railings working from his barn. He was a pipefitter with Local 332 United Association of Plumbers and Pipefitters in Westville, New Jersey, served for years as the local's president, and later headed up the local's health & welfare fund. Pedersen was involved with the real estate and insurance business. In 1953, he served as mayor of Clementon and was a Republican. Previously, Pedersen served as the borough clerk. He also served on the Board of Education of the Clementon School District and was president of the school board. From 1968 to 1970, Pedersen served in the New Jersey General Assembly. Later, Pedersen served on the New Jersey Real Estate Commission for seven years, appointed by Governor William Cahill. Pedersen died at his home in Clementon.
