= Lake Paradise =

Lake Paradise may refer to:

Australia

- Lake Paradise (Queensland), a reservoir in the North Burnett Region

New Zealand

- Lake Paradise (Canterbury), a lake in Canterbury, New Zealand
- Lake Paradise (Fiordland), a lake in Fiordland National Park, New Zealand

United States of America

- Lake Paradise (Arkansas), a lake in Chicot County, Arkansas
- Lake Paradise (Illinois), a reservoir in Illinois, United States
- Lake Paradise (Michigan), a lake in Michigan, United States

== See also ==
- Paradise Lake (disambiguation)
- Paradise Dam (disambiguation)
