= Mardi Gras Hangover =

Amusement ride at Niagara Amusement Park

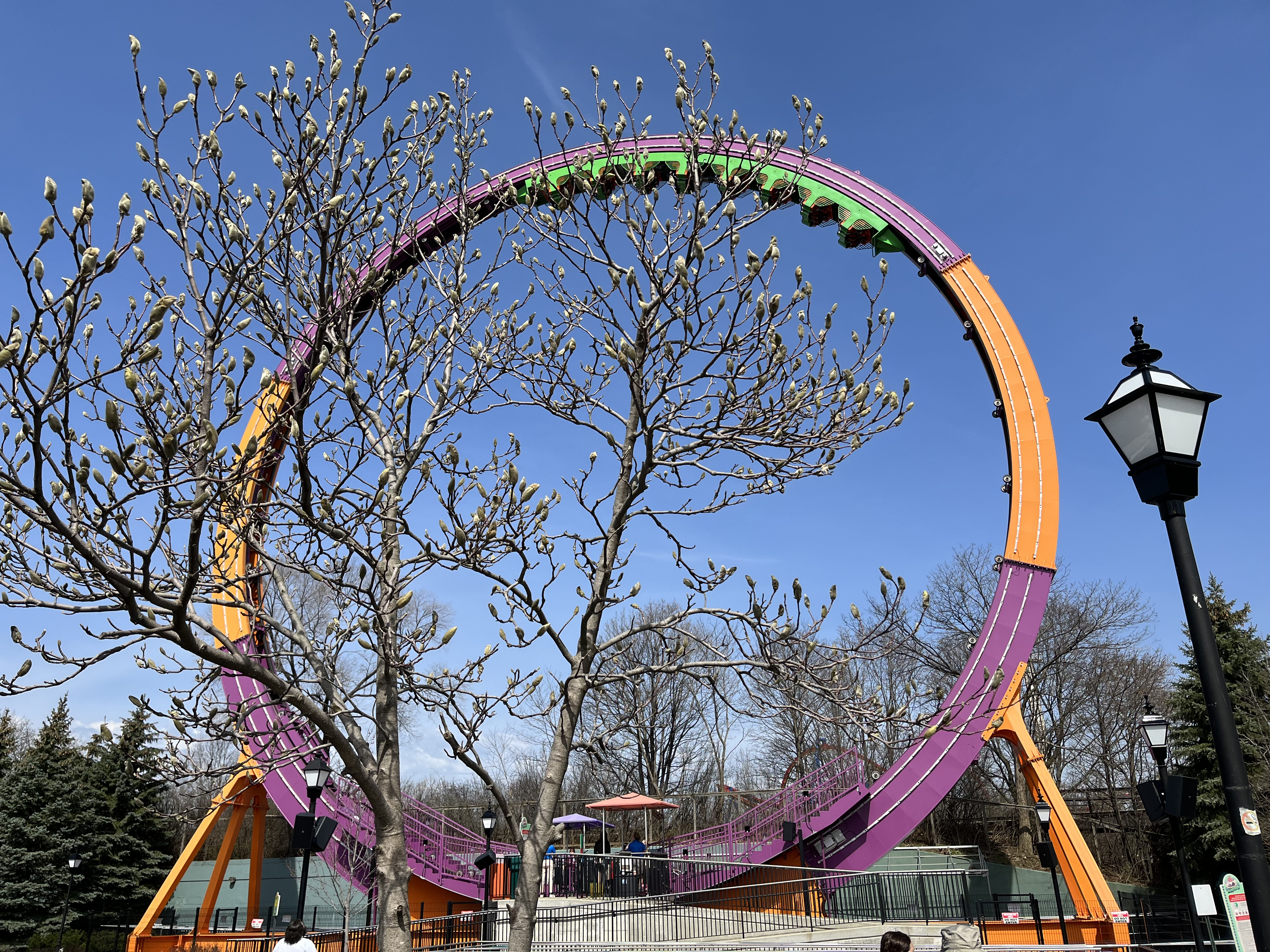

Niagara Amusement Park & Splash World
- Status: Under construction

Six Flags Great America
- Area: Mardi Gras
- Coordinates: 42.3695°N 87.9335°W
- Opening date: May 22, 2018
- Closing date: October 29, 2023
- Replaced: King Chaos

Ride statistics
- Attraction type: Fire Ball
- Manufacturer: Larson International
- Model: Super Loop
- Theme: Mardi Gras
- Height: 100 ft (30 m)
- Speed: 30 mph (48 km/h)
- Height restriction: 48 in (122 cm)

Mardi Gras Hangover is a fire ball attraction currently in storage at Niagara Amusement Park & Splash World in Grand Island, New York, United States. The attraction was previously located at Six Flags Great America from 2018 to 2023, before being delivered to Niagara Amusement Park in February 2024. Manufactured by Larson International, it is one of the tallest fire ball amusement rides in the world at a height of 100 feet (30 m) tall.

Billed by Six Flags Great America as a "loop roller coaster” and the park's sixteenth coaster, the name was called inaccurate by experts and critics as the ride lacked reliance on the force of gravity, relying more on motorized wheels. The ride reached speeds of up to 30 miles per hour (48 km/h) with its seating being described as "face-off."

== History ==
=== Six Flags Great America ===
Six Flags Great America opened their Mardi Gras section in May 2004, replacing part of the Orleans Place themed section. One of the first original attractions for the new themed section was King Chaos, which was manufactured by HUSS as a top spin attraction. King Chaos sat on a plot of land formerly occupied by The Edge in the 1980s and Power Dive in 1990s. Thirteen years after the original opening of King Chaos, the park announced that the attraction would close on August 27, 2017. In a statement by the park, the ride was planned to be removed to "make room for new thrills." The replacement for King Chaos planned for the 2018 season was teased to be announced on August 31, 2017, with the teasing phrase being "Chase The Storm."

On August 31, 2017, Six Flags Great America officially announced an unnamed attraction. Billed as the world's largest "loop coaster," the ride would be 100 feet (30 m), and was called the sixteenth roller coaster by the park. The attraction was rumored to be named "Hurricane Force", but due to the effects of Hurricane Harvey, this was speculated to have been withheld. Details for the unnamed attraction were revealed, which was described as having "face-off" seating, which riders were seated face-to-face with each other going around in a ring structure. The name "loop coaster" would be called inaccurate and misleading by experts and critics, citing lack of reliance on the force of gravity to coast on ride track while also stating that the ride is also controlled by motorized wheels that drive trains back and forth.

The official name for the attraction was revealed on Valentine's Day, February 14, 2018, as Mardi Gras Hangover. Along with the ride, a Mardi Gras event called the "Mardi Gras Festival" was also announced to run during the summer. Mardi Gras Hangover officially opened to the public during the Memorial Day weekend on May 22, 2018.

=== Removal and Niagara Amusement Park ===
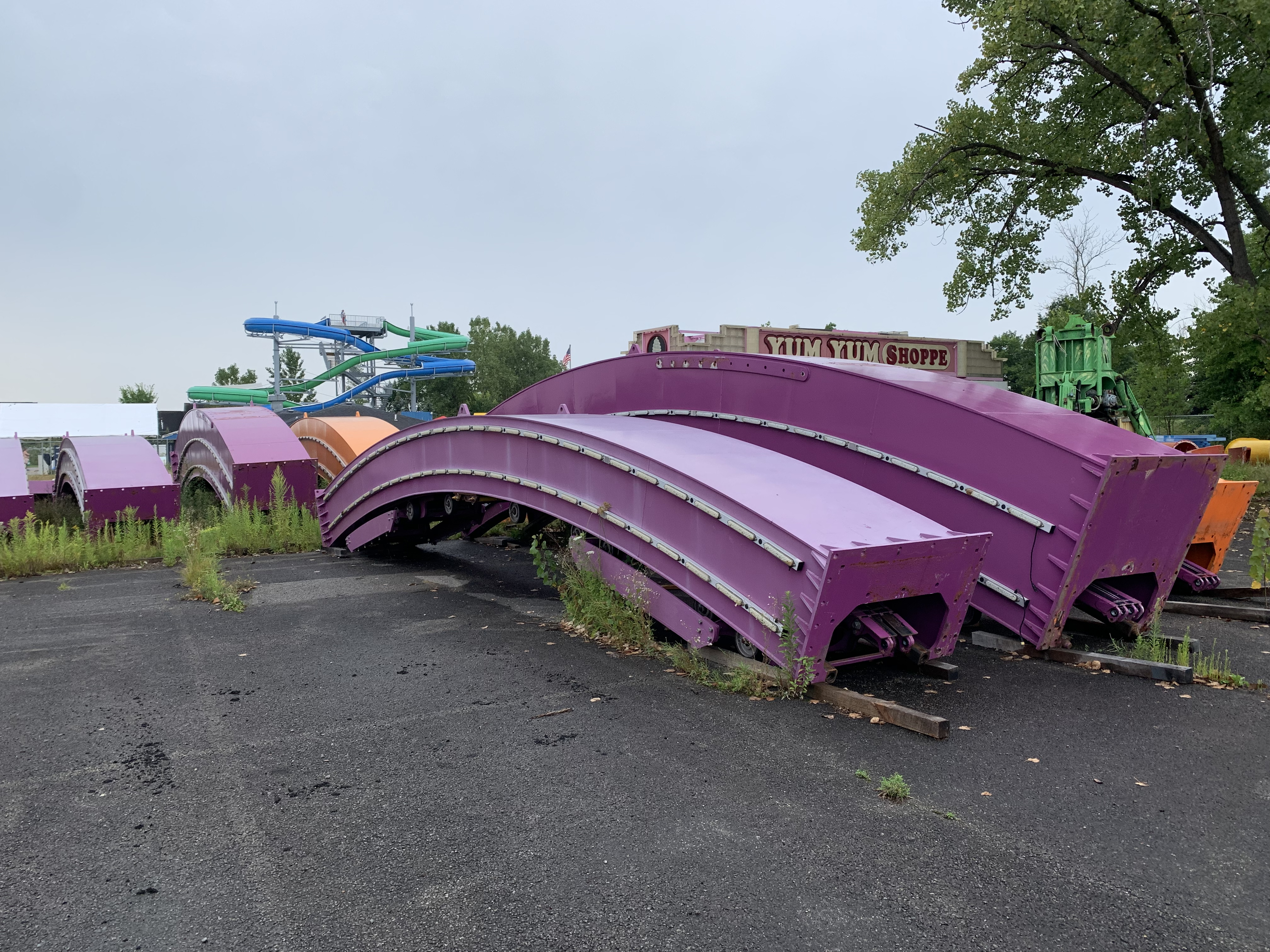
Mardi Gras Hangover in storage at Niagara Amusement Park

Six Flags Great America abruptly announced the Mardi Gras Hangover’s retirement on October 23, 2023, after five years of operation, citing that they would use the area for future development. The ride and another ride at the park, Revolution – a HUSS frisbee ride – were dismantled in December 2023.

In February 2024, both rides were delivered to Niagara Amusement Park, close to 600 miles away outside of Buffalo, New York. Niagara had been permanently closed in 2020 by then-operators Apex Parks Group, who promptly dismantled a majority of the park's rides. Upon taking control of the park, IB Parks & Entertainment sought out as many second-hand replacement rides as they could acquire. Revolution was constructed over the summer where it reopened as Midway Mayhem; it remains unknown if or when Mardi Gras Hangover will be constructed.

== Characteristics ==
=== Ride experience ===
The train lifts up multiple times and goes down in one direction, before going in the other direction, with some moments of hangtime at the peak of the ride, at 100 feet (30 m). The ride reaches speeds of up to 30 miles per hour (48 km/h).

== See also ==
- Fire Ball
