= Fire Ball =

Amusement ride

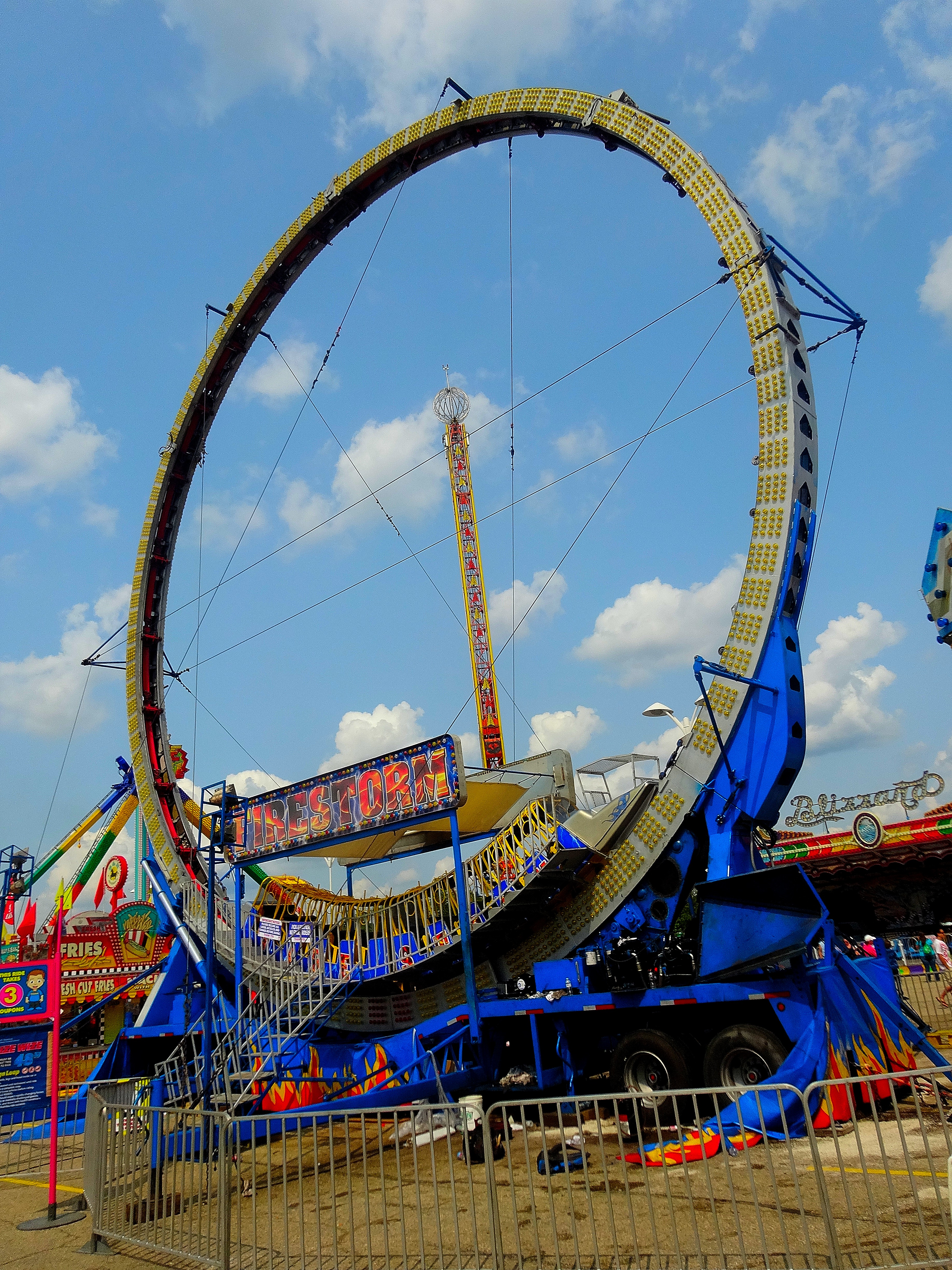
- A Ring of Fire ride at a fair in 2014
- Manufacturer: Larson International
- Previous names: Super Loops (1970s); Ring of Fire (1988)

The Fire Ball is a type of amusement ride manufactured by Larson International. It replaced a series of Larson rides manufactured prior to its unveiling, the first being the Super Loops and the second being the Ring of Fire. The ride features a roller coaster-type train which rolls along a ring-shaped track, turning riders upside down at the top of the loop. Older models of this ride type have trains with each half of the train facing opposite directions, with a protective metal cage and a rigid lap bar restraining the riders. In 1972 Larson unveiled their new Super Loop ride. In 1998, Larson introduced a new roofless, open-air train with over-the-shoulder harnesses and seats that sit riders face-to-face with each other. Some owners of the older Ring of Fire rides have had the caged train replaced with the new Fire Ball train.

Though the ride share similarities with that of a roller coaster, notably having a train which rolls along a track, it is often not considered as such since the ride is powered by motorized drive tires, and not by gravity like a roller coaster.

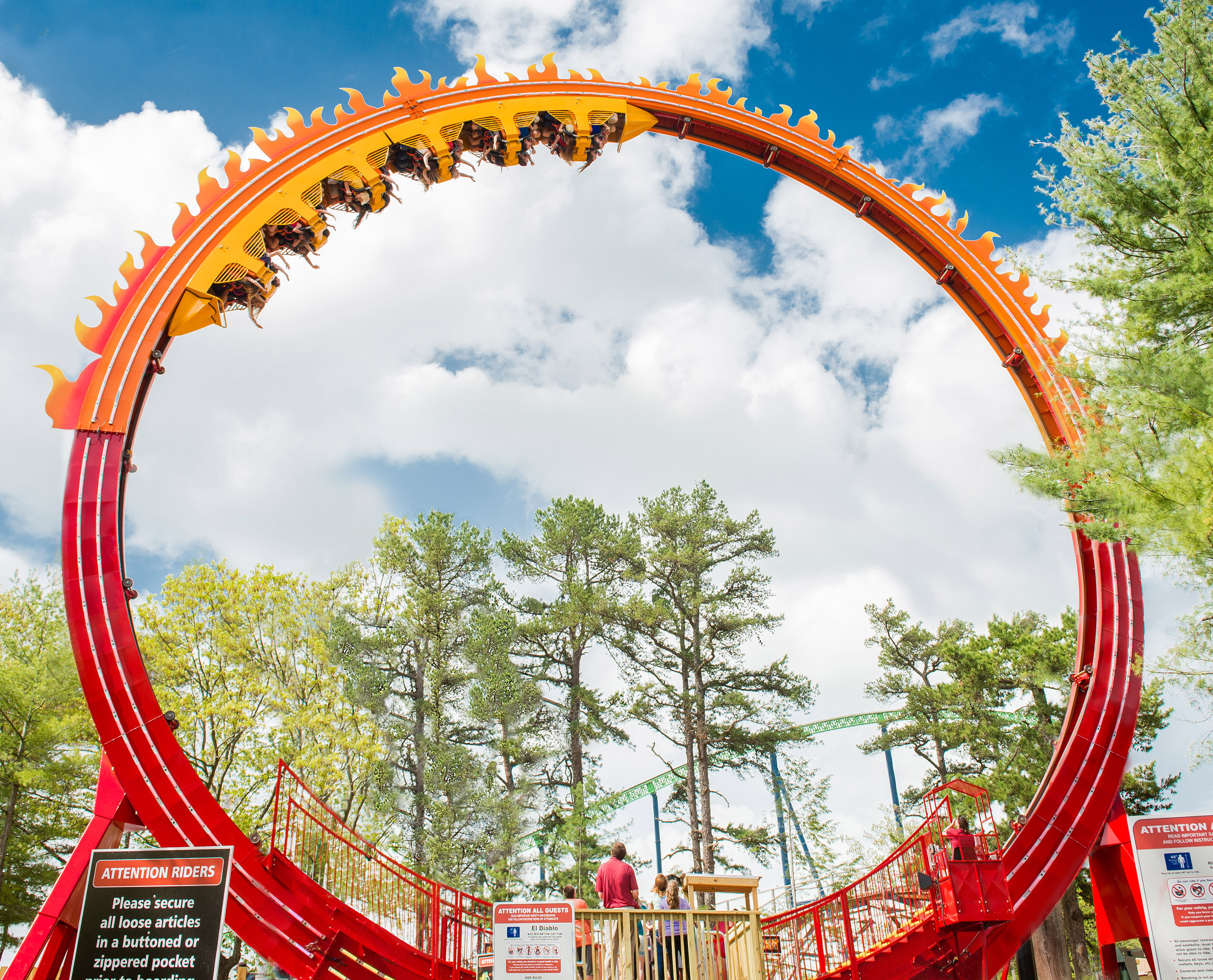
El Diablo at Six Flags Great Adventure. This is Larson International's 22M Giant Loop, a larger version of the Fire Ball. This installation is now located at La Ronde as Chaos.

== Design ==
Larson makes three different versions of the ride: The Fire Ball, the 22M Giant Loop, and the Giga Loop 100ft. Each ride provides a similar ride experience, but are larger than each other in terms of both size and capacity.

Model name	Height/Length	Rider capacity	Transportable	Notes
Fire Ball	58 feet (18 m)	20 passengers	Yes	
22M Giant Loop	73 feet (22 m)	24 passengers	No	
Giga Loop 100 Ft	101 feet (31 m)	32 passengers	No	

The ride structure is a large steel boxed-track loop attached to a concrete base or portable trailer with supporting outriggers and steel cables. In this boxed track is a multiple-piece pivoted end-rim (inertia ring) with wheel dogs attached settled within this boxed track. On one section of the rim the train is snugly placed. The rim is run through a shock-absorbent tire drive, which drives the train around the loop.

The ride's train is rocked back and forth at a generous rate, as not to put too much stress on the tire drive. It elevates on every pass through the station until it has gained enough momentum to make it completely around the loop, thus riders experiencing hangtime (the feeling of themselves almost falling out of their seats). Once a number of consecutive loops are made, it can be shifted to go the other direction. It can also be stopped at the top. Since the Super Loop-styled rides are tire-driven, even the slightest water build-up on the rim can cause the drive tires to hydroplane on the rim. This action keeps the ride from completing its loop and can sometimes make a loud squeal. Like many amusement rides, these rides should not be operated during inclement weather such as thunderstorms.

== Operation ==
Most of the Super Loop-styled rides are manually operated with a toggle handle. Most of these rides have a dead man's operator chair that detects the absence of an operator. This prevents the ride from moving in case the handle is bumped without an operator being sat in the chair. Operators of these rides have to be knowledgeable of weight distribution and speed-to-distance ratio. The amount of power needed to operate this ride is 240 volts, 250 amps (60 kW).

These rides have numerous safety features that include:

- Emergency power cut-off button.
- Dead-man's operator chair that detects the absence of an operator.
- Anti-air double-lock harnesses with secondary precaution belt that activates when air is released.
- Pull-up-and-move operation toggle that will only move when tip of handle is compressed.
- Height requirement of 48 inches (1.22 metres).

== Park installations ==
Name	Park	Country	Model	Opened	Status	Notes
Bourbon Street Fireball	Six Flags America	United States	22M Giant Loop	2015	Removed	Removed in 2023.
Brain Drain	Elitch Gardens	United States	22M Giant Loop	2014	Operating	
Rolling Thunder Formerly Brain Drain	Frontier City	United States	22M Giant Loop	2015	Operating	
Chaos Formerly El Diablo	La Ronde; Six Flags Great Adventure	Canada	22M Giant Loop	2019; 2015 - 2018	Operating	Originally announced as Looping Dragon at Six Flags Great Adventure but was renamed El Diablo before its opening. Closed in 2018 and relocated to La Ronde for the 2019 season.
Cyclone	Galveston Island Historic Pleasure Pier	United States	Fire Ball	2012	Operating	
Dare Devil Chaos Coaster	Six Flags Discovery Kingdom	United States	22M Giant Loop	2015	Removed	Removed in 2022.
Delirious	Valleyfair	United States	22M Giant Loop	2018	Operating	
El Diablo	Six Flags Over Texas	United States	Giga Loop 100 Ft	2019	In storage	Originally announced as Lone Star Revolution but was renamed El Diablo before its opening. Removed in 2024 and sold to IB Parks & Entertainment; in storage at Clementon Park.
Eye of the Storm	Kentucky Kingdom	United States	22M Giant Loop	2017	removed	Removed in 2024
Fireball	Six Flags Fiesta Texas	United States	22M Giant Loop	2016	Operating	
Fireball	Six Flags New England	United States	22M Giant Loop	2016	Removed	Damaged beyond repair during a storm in 2021.
Fireball	Six Flags St. Louis	United States	22M Giant Loop	2016	Operating	
Fire Ball	Cliff's Amusement Park	United States	Fire Ball	2013	Operating	
Fire Ball	Lake Winnepesaukah	United States	Fire Ball	2012	Operating	
Flare	Kemah Boardwalk	United States	22M Giant Loop	2014	Operating	
Giant Loop (环翼飞车)	Happy Valley Shenzhen	China	22M Giant Loop	2019	Operating	
Greezed Lightnin'	Six Flags Great Escape and Hurricane Harbor	United States	22M Giant Loop	2016	Operating	
Joker: Chaos Coaster	Six Flags Over Georgia	United States	22M Giant Loop	2015	Removed	Removed in 2022 after years of operational difficulties. Replaced by Kid Flash Cosmic Coaster in 2023.
Mardi Gras Hangover	Niagara Amusement Park & Splash World; Six Flags Great America	United States	Giga Loop 100 Ft	TBD; 2018 - 2023	In storage	The first installation of the Giga Loop.
Ring of Fire	Clementon Park and Splash World	United States	Fire Ball	2010	Operating	
Rolling Thunder	Six Flags Darien Lake	United States	22M Giant Loop	2015	Operating	
Wheel of Wind and Fire（風火輪）	Leofoo Village Theme Park	Taiwan	22M Giant Loop	1999	Operating	
Zero G	Indiana Beach	United States	Fire Ball	2016	Removed	Removed in 2020
