= IB Parks & Entertainment =

American amusement park owner and operator

- Type: Private
- Industry: Amusement parks
- Founded: 2020
- Founder: Gene Staples
- Headquarters: Chicago, Illinois, U.S.
- Number of locations: 5 parks (2026)
- Website: https://ibparks.com/

IB Parks & Entertainment (formerly known as Indiana Beach Holdings, LLC) is an American amusement park company based in Chicago, Illinois, United States. Established in 2020 when CEO Gene Staples purchased Indiana Beach, the company now owns four parks across the Midwest and Northeast United States. Additionally, they handle operations at a fifth park, Lake Winnepesaukah.

== History ==
On February 18, 2020, Indiana Beach's previous owner, Apex Parks Group, announced that the Monticello, Indiana, amusement park would be closing permanently. Apex confirmed that the decision was made due to ongoing financial struggles, and that the park's assets would be distributed across their other properties in California and Florida.

Because of Indiana Beach's economic and social value to the community, White County officials were hopeful that the park could find a new owner. On March 31, 2020, they promised $3 million worth of financial incentives to anyone who bought Indiana Beach. The following month, it was confirmed that Chicago-area businessman Gene Staples had purchased the park from Apex, and that it would reopen under his new company, Indiana Beach Holdings, LLC. Indiana Beach held its grand reopening on June 27, 2020. Being an amusement park enthusiast himself, Staples was passionate about his purchase of the park, stating that he was driven by his wish to preserve the park rather than financial gain. This preservation mission would go on to influence the company's future investments.

In March 2021, Indiana Beach Holdings purchased its second property, Clementon Park and Splash World in Clementon, New Jersey, for $2.3 million. Like Indiana Beach, Clementon Park had been shut down by its previous owner in 2019, and after Gene Staples visited the park, he immediately "saw the potential in bringing it back". He acquired the park through an auction, which was originally intended to sell off assets before redeveloping the property's land. Clementon Park reopened on June 25, 2021.

The company acquired a third property, the former Fantasy Island in Grand Island, New York, in June 2021. Like Indiana Beach, Fantasy Island was previously owned by Apex Parks Group and was another casualty of that company's financial woes in 2020. The park was rebranded as Niagara Amusement Park and Splash World, and by 2022, the full property reopened. Upon purchasing Fantasy Island, having grown into a full amusement park chain with three properties, Indiana Beach Holdings officially rebranded under the name IB Parks & Entertainment.

In December 2024, IB Parks & Entertainment announced its purchase of Big Kahuna's, an indoor/outdoor water park in West Berlin, New Jersey. Located just a few miles from Clementon Park, Big Kahuna's was rebranded under its original name, Sahara Sam's, before reopening under its new ownership. This is the company's first property that operates year-round (indoor attractions only).

On January 9, 2026, the company entered a partnership with the owners of Lake Winnepesaukah in Rossville, Georgia. IB Parks & Entertainment took over long-term operations, but the park's existing ownership remained in place.

== Properties ==
As of April 2026, IB Parks & Entertainment owns four parks and operates one more.

=== Owned parks ===
Name	Location	Year opened	Year acquired	Notes
Indiana Beach	Monticello, Indiana	1926	2020	Acquired from Apex Parks Group. The chain's flagship park.
Clementon Park and Splash World	Clementon, New Jersey	1907	2021	Acquired from a subsidiary of Premier Parks, LLC. Park currently listed for sale.
Niagara Amusement Park and Splash World	Grand Island, New York	1961	2021	Previously known as Fantasy Island. Park currently listed for sale.
Sahara Sam's	West Berlin, New Jersey	2009	2024	Previously known as Big Kahuna's. The chain's only standalone water park.

=== Operated parks ===
Name	Location	Year opened	Year acquired	Notes
Lake Winnepesaukah	Rossville, Georgia	1925	2026	The chain's first park that it solely operates.

== Leadership ==
As of April 2026, IB Parks & Entertainment's leadership includes the following:

- Gene Staples — chief executive officer, founder
- Gary Fawks — senior vice president of operations
- Tom Crisci — vice president of risk management
- Staci Crisci — vice president of marketing
