= Cannon Ball (roller coaster) =

Roller coaster at Lake Winnepesaukah

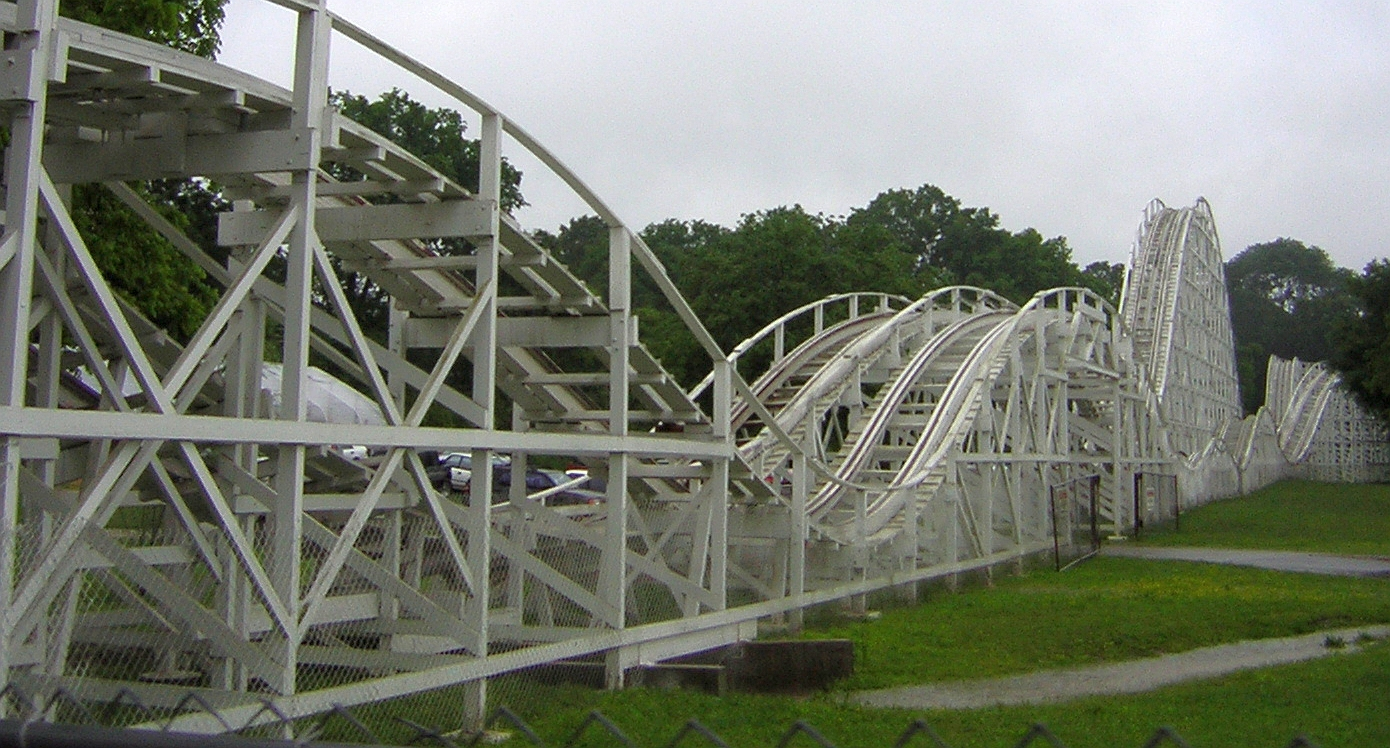
- Cannon Ball in 2006

Lake Winnepesaukah
- Location: Lake Winnepesaukah
- Coordinates: 34.974821°N 85.248504°W
- Status: Operating
- Opening date: 1967

General statistics
- Type: Wood
- Manufacturer: Philadelphia Toboggan Coasters
- Designer: John C. Allen
- Track layout: Out-and-back
- Lift/launch system: Chain lift hill
- Height: 70 ft (21 m)
- Length: 2,272 ft (693 m)
- Speed: 50 mph (80 km/h)
- Duration: 1:32
- Max vertical angle: 45°
- Restraint style: Buzz lap bar with seat belt
- Height restriction: 48 in (122 cm)
- Trains: 2 trains with 3 cars; riders arranged 2 across in 3 rows for a total of 18 riders per train
- Must transfer from wheelchair
- Cannon Ball at RCDB

Cannon Ball is a wooden roller coaster located at Lake Winnepesaukah amusement park in Rossville, Georgia, United States. The ride opened in 1967, was designed by John C. Allen, and was built by Philadelphia Toboggan Coasters. It is one of three roller coasters at the park.
