= Jack Rabbit (Clementon Park) =

Former roller coaster at Clementon Park and Splash World

- The ride in 1970

Clementon Park
- Location: Clementon Park
- Coordinates: 39°48′14.6″N 74°59′03.8″W
- Status: Removed
- Opening date: 1919
- Closing date: 2002

General statistics
- Type: Wood
- Manufacturer: Philadelphia Toboggan Coasters
- Designer: John A. Miller
- Model: Wooden
- Lift/launch system: Chain lift hill
- Height: 50 ft (15 m)
- Length: 1,380 ft (420 m)
- Jack Rabbit at RCDB

Jack Rabbit was a wooden roller coaster located at Clementon Park and Splash World in Clementon, New Jersey, United States. The coaster opened in 1919, having been built by Philadelphia Toboggan Coasters and designed by John A. Miller. It operated for 81 years before closing to the public in 2002. The coaster then stood out of operation for several years until it was demolished in 2007. It was one of the oldest operating roller coasters in the world at the time of its closure.

== Incident ==
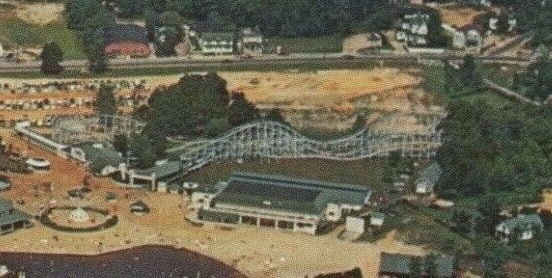
Bird's eye view of Jack Rabbit at Clementon Park in the 1960s

On August 5, 1998, a train derailed before engaging with the lift hill, hitting the park's management office and injuring the three passengers in the front car. They were taken to the local hospital and later released.
