= Lake Winnepesaukah =

Amusement and water park in Rossville, Georgia

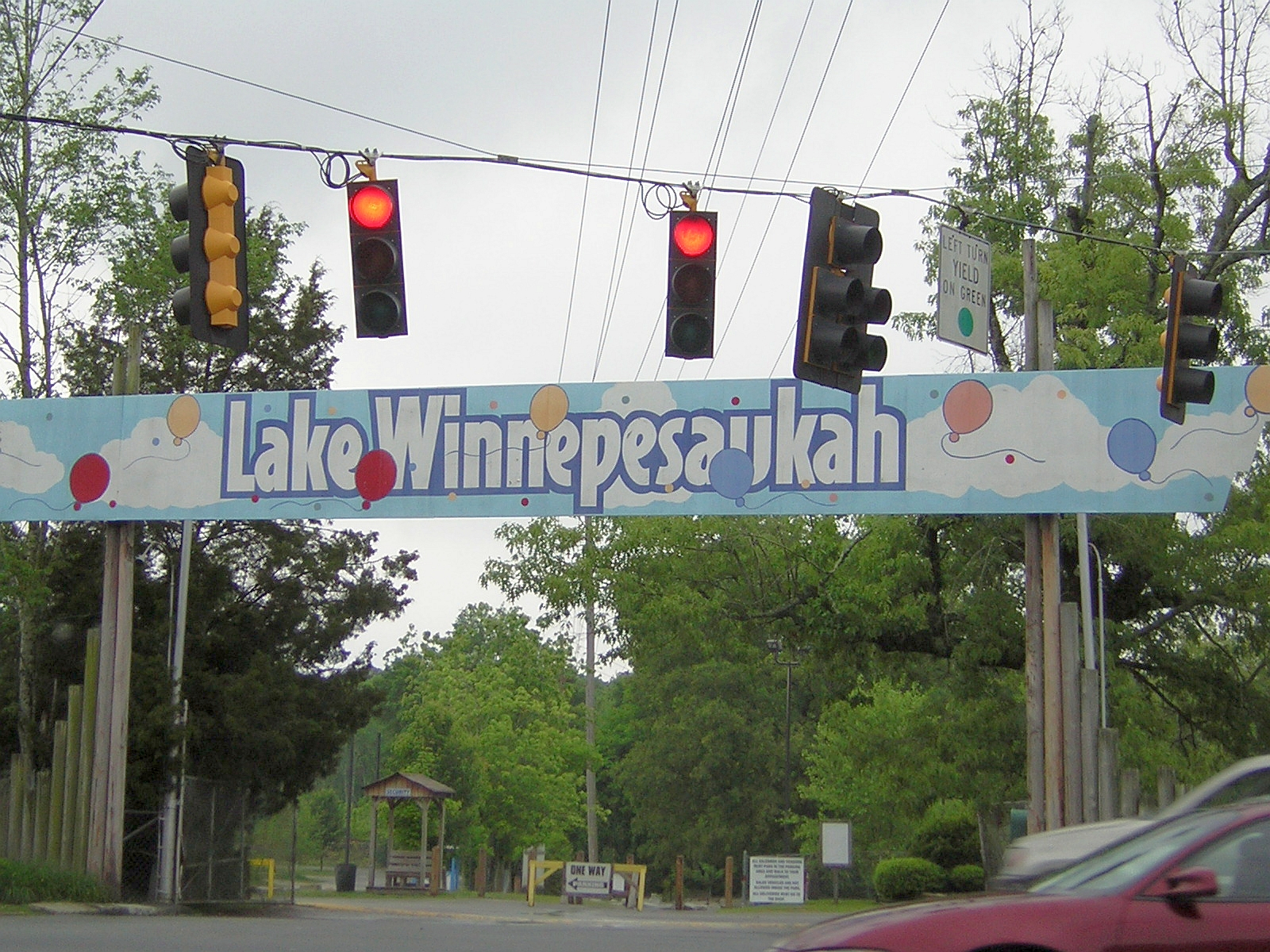
- Park entrance
- Interactive map of Lake Winnepesaukah
- Location: Rossville, Georgia
- Coordinates: 34°58′35″N 85°14′50″W
- Status: Operating
- Opened: June 1, 1925
- Owner: Dixon family
- Operated by: IB Parks & Entertainment
- Slogan: "Come on, get happy!"
- Operating season: May to October
- Area: 85 acres (34 ha)

Attractions
- Total: 37
- Roller coasters: 2
- Water rides: 8
- Website: www.lakewinnie.com

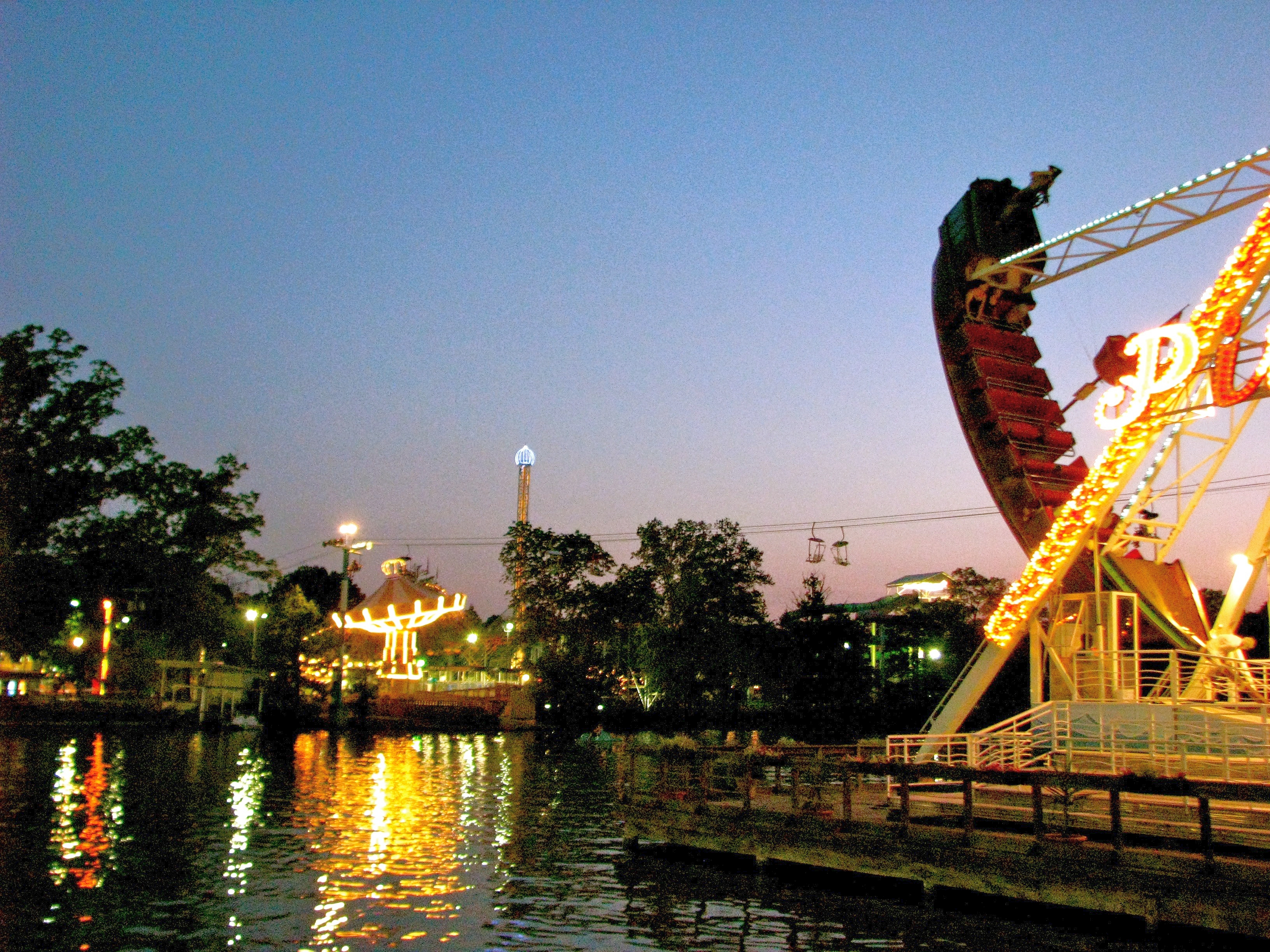
The park at night in 2011

Lake Winnepesaukah, often shortened to Lake Winnie, is an amusement park and water park located in Rossville, Georgia, United States. The park opened in 1925, and has been owned by the Dixon family since its inception. It is currently operated by IB Parks & Entertainment.

In the park's early years, its primary focus was on its water attractions. In the late 1960s, the park began expanding with the addition of dry amusement rides, such as a carousel and a roller coaster. Today, the park has 38 rides and eight water park attractions

== History ==
In 1924, Carl and Minette Dixon purchased approximately 100 acres (40 ha) surrounding a 9-acre (3.6 ha) lake in Rossville, Georgia. The park which they constructed on the land opened to the public on June 1, 1925, entertaining over 5,000 visitors with amenities for boating, fishing, and picnicking. The Dixons chose the name "Winnepesaukah", which supposedly came from a Cherokee word meaning "beautiful lake of the highlands".

The following year, they opened a 22,000-square-foot (2,000 m^{2}) swimming pool, the largest in the southeastern United States at the time. Carl Dixon later designed a Mill Chute attraction, which opened under the name Boat Chute in 1927. The National Amusement Park Historical Association (NAPHA) considers it the oldest operating mill chute in the United States.

In the 1940s and 1950s, several flat rides were added to the park, and in the 1960s, the first roller coasters were installed, beginning with Mad Mouse in 1960 and Cannon Ball in 1967. In the 21st century, the park has seen the addition of modern thrill rides such as the drop tower ride OH-Zone! and an inverting ride called Fire Ball. In 2013, the park expanded to include the 5-acre (2.0 ha) SOAKYa water park.

In 2026, the Dixon family entered a partnership with IB Parks & Entertainment. The latter received the rights to operate Lake Winnepesaukah, though the Dixon family retained ownership of the park.

== Attractions ==
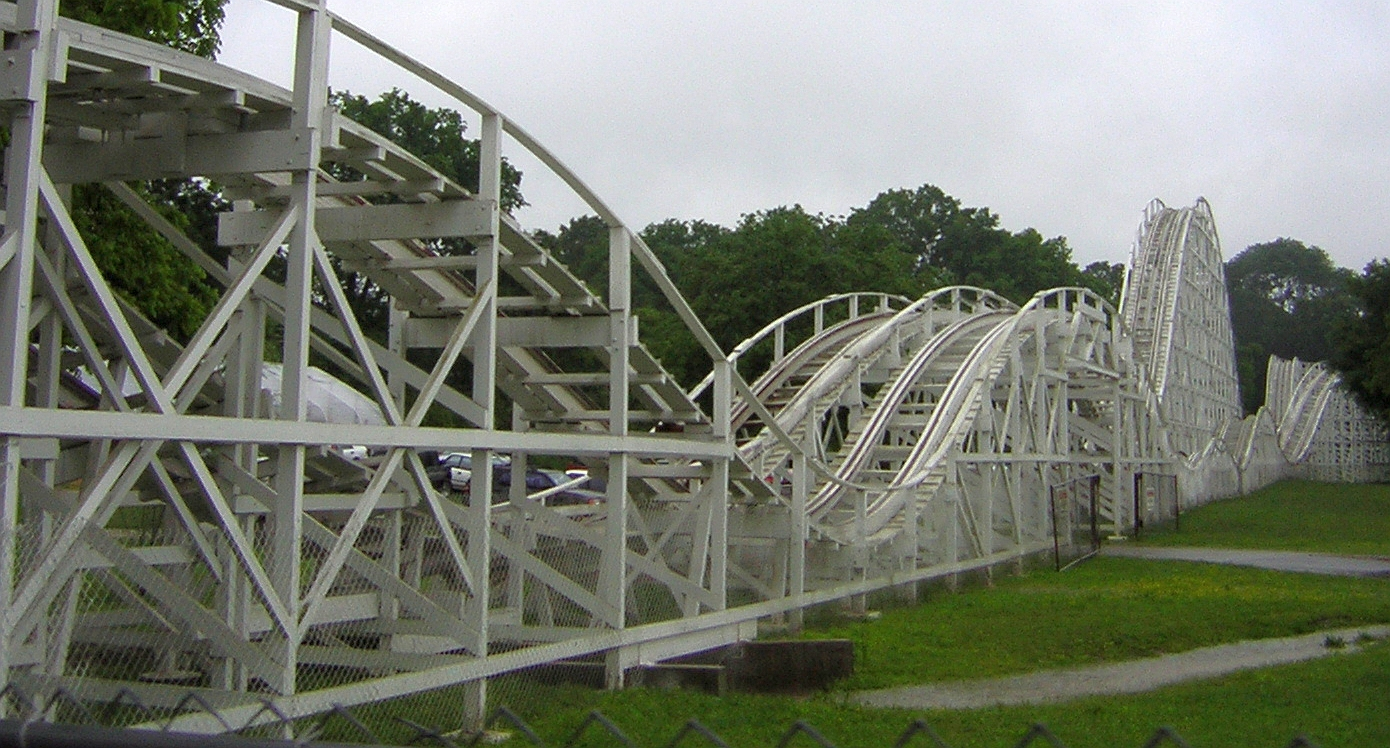
Cannon Ball in 2006

=== Roller coasters ===
Name	Year opened	Type	Manufacturer	Notes
Cannon Ball	1967	Wooden roller coaster	Philadelphia Toboggan Company	Designed by John C. Allen
Wacky Worm	1991	Steel children's roller coaster	Fajume	
Lookout Safari	2026	Steel children's roller coaster	Zierer	Relocated from the Indianapolis Zoo, where it operated as Kōmbo from 2001 to 2026

=== Thrill rides ===
Name	Year opened	Type	Manufacturer	Notes
Boat Chute	1927	Old Mill	Carol Dixon	The first ride at Lake Winnepesaukah and the oldest Mill Chute in operation in the United States
Bumper Cars	Unknown	Bumper cars	Unknown	
Conestoga	2004	Rainbow	HUSS Park Attractions	Originally operated at Hersheypark from 1984 to 2002
Fire Ball	2012	Fire Ball	Larson International	
Genie	Unknown	Super Round Up	Frank Hrubetz & Company	During the 2016-2017 off-season, a tree fell onto the ride during a storm, causing major damage. The ride did not operate in 2017 while it underwent repairs, and returned in the 2018 season in a new location.
OH-Zone!	2005	Drop tower	ARM Rides	140 feet (43 m) tall
Orbiter	Early 2000s	Orbiter	Tivoli Enterprises	
Pirate	Early 2000s	Swinging ship	Mulligan	
Twister	2016	Asymmetrical Maverick	Moser's Rides	
Catch 'N Air	2024	Catch 'N Air	Majestic	

=== Family rides ===
Name	Year opened	Type	Manufacturer	Notes
Alpine Way	1960	Sky Ride	Hopkins Rides	
Antique Cars	Unknown	Antique cars	Unknown	
Antique Carrousel	1968	Carousel	Philadelphia Toboggan Coasters	PTC carousel number 39, originally manufactured in 1916. Among the oldest in the country, the ride includes 68 hand-painted horses.
Balloon Ride	1997	Balloon Race	Zamperla	
Ferris Wheel	Unknown	Ferris wheel	Eli Bridge Company	
Matterhorn	Unknown	Matterhorn	Chance Rides	
Paddle Boats	Unknown	Paddle boats	Unknown	
Paratrooper	1966	Paratrooper	Frank Hrubetz & Company	
Scrambler	1980	Scrambler	Eli Bridge Company	
Tilt-a-Whirl	1960	Tilt-A-Whirl	Sellner Manufacturing	
Tour Train	Unknown	Rideable miniature railway	Chance Rides	
Wacky Factory	1969	Dark ride	Unknown	
Wave Swinger	1999	Swing ride	Zierer	

=== Kiddie rides ===
Name	Year opened	Type	Manufacturer
Bumble Bees	Unknown	Spinning bee ride	Unknown
Free Whale	2010	Miniature swinging ship	Moser's Rides
Frog Hopper	2000	Miniature drop tower	S&S Worldwide
Jumbo Elephants	1980	Spinning elephant ride	Zamperla
Kiddie Boats	1940s	Spinning boat ride	Allan Herschell Company
Kiddie Swings	Unknown	Miniature swing ride	Unknown
Lady Bugs	Unknown	Spinning ladybug ride	Kasper Klaus
Motorcycles	Unknown	Spinning vehicle ride	Hampton Amusement Company
Parachutes	Unknown	Miniature drop tower	Unknown
Silly Saucers	Unknown	Spinning ride	Hampton Amusement Company
Sports Cars	Unknown	Spinning vehicle ride	Unknown
Stay and Play Hideaway	Unknown	Interactive play structure	Unknown

=== SOAKYa water park attractions ===
Name	Type	Notes
Coke Float Cove	Water obstacle course	
Crazy River	Lazy river	
Soak-N-Slide	Children's play area with four slides	
Splish-N-Splash	Two body slides	
Twist-N-Shout	Two raft slides	
Water Works	Water play area	
Winnie 500	Multi-lane mat racer slide	
Zoom Flume	Raft slide	Originally known as Pipeline Plunge and was part of the dry park. From the 2016 season onward, they have been included in the water park instead.

== Former attractions ==
=== Roller coasters ===
Name	Year opened	Year closed	Type	Manufacturer	Notes
Little Dipper	1959	Unknown	Steel children's roller coaster	Allan Herschell Company	
Mad Mouse	1960	Unknown	Steel wild mouse roller coaster	Allan Herschell Company	
Wild Lightnin'	2001	2021	Steel wild mouse roller coaster	L&T Systems	Known as Wild Thing for a single season in 2001. Moved to Alabama Adventure & Splash Adventure where it reopened in 2022 as Cheddar Chase.

== Incidents ==
- On April 19, 2003, a crowd disturbance described as a "near-riot" involving 500 to 700 youths took place outside the park after management decided to close the park 90 minutes early. Catoosa County sheriff Phil Summers claimed the incident was caused by parents leaving their children unattended at the park with little or no money, thus unable to participate in the park's activities. When sporadic fighting began in the crowded park, the decision was made to close the park early, which only escalated the fighting. Law enforcement agencies from Georgia and Tennessee were dispatched to the scene when the crowd began to disrupt traffic on roads surrounding the park. After the incident, the park instituted a new policy of requiring visitors under 16 years of age to be accompanied by a parent or guardian. Visitors were also required to buy some sort of admission.
- On July 16th, 2016, two children were ejected from the Fly-O-Plane ride and injured. The ride was removed following the incident.
