= Clementon Park and Splash World =

Former amusement and water park in Clementon, New Jersey

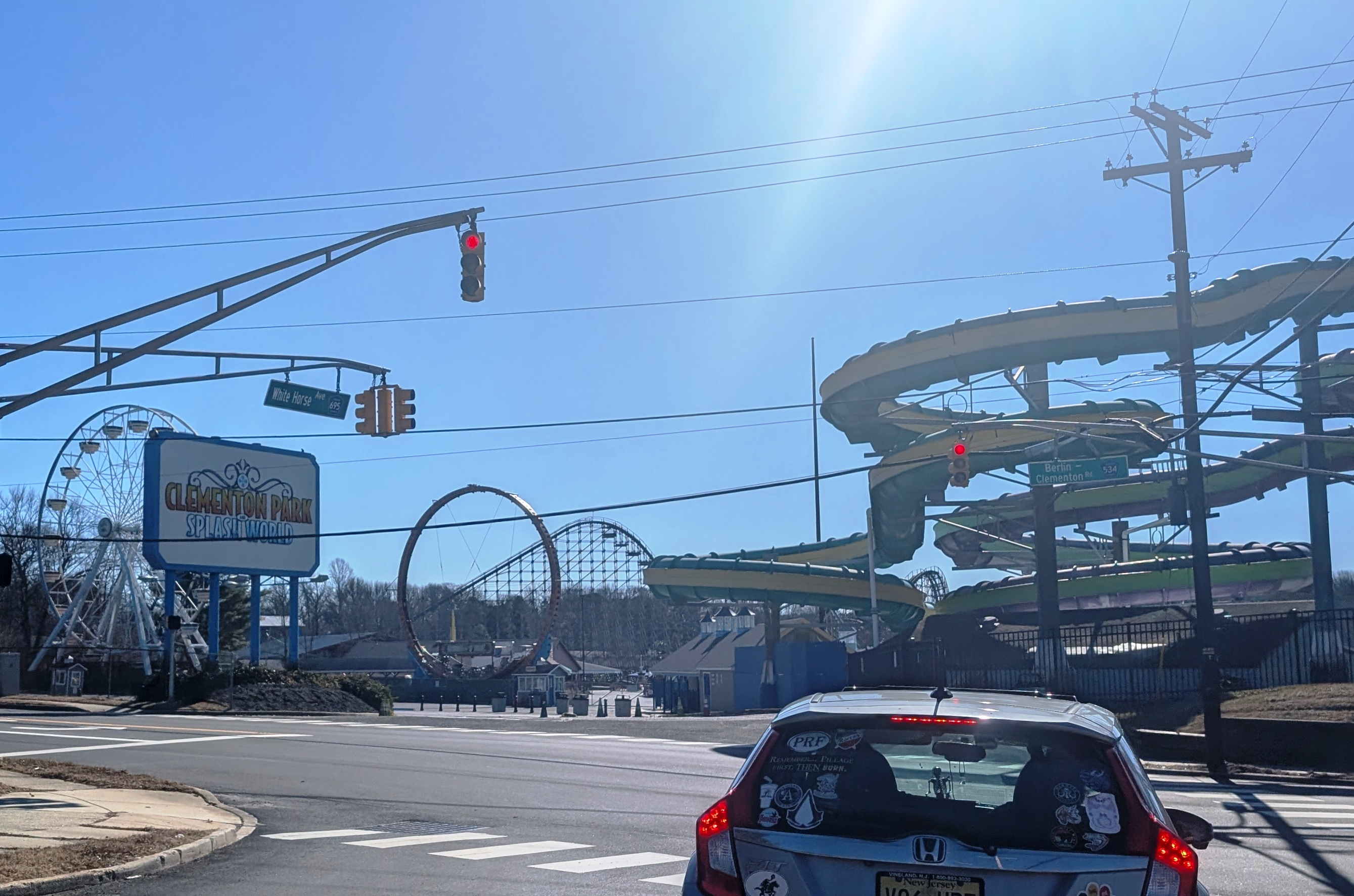
- Entrance to the park in 2025
- Interactive map of Clementon Park and Splash World
- Location: 144 Berlin Road, P.O. Box 125, Clementon, New Jersey
- Coordinates: 39.8031°N 74.9847°W
- Status: Defunct
- Opened: 1907; 119 years ago
- Closed: September 7, 2026
- Owner: IB Parks & Entertainment
- Operated by: IB Parks & Entertainment
- Area: 17 acres (6.9 ha)

Attractions
- Total: 19
- Roller coasters: 2
- Water rides: 1
- Website: www.clementonpark.com

Clementon Park and Splash World (previously Clementon Lake Park) was an amusement park and water park in Clementon, New Jersey. It was one of the world's oldest operating amusement parks, having opened in 1907, and was one of only thirteen trolley parks left in operation before it closed. It was independently owned and operated for several decades, and was purchased in 2011 by Clementon Lake Holdings, a subsidiary of Premier Parks, LLC.

The park closed in September 2019, and was put up for auction on March 23, 2021. The park in its entirety was purchased by IB Parks & Entertainment with plans to reopen later in 2021. The park returned to operations on June 25, 2021. The park announced in September 2026 that it would permanently close following the end of the 2026 season.

== History ==
=== 1907–1919 ===
The park was founded in 1907 by New Jersey assemblyman Theodore B. Gibbs and his sons, Edgar B. and Willard. Theodore Gibbs was a Civil War veteran and held many local offices, including postmaster and sheriff. He was also a member of the Atlantic City Railroad's Board of Directors.

The amusement park was a popular destination in the early decades of the twentieth century with a trolley running from the city of Camden to the park's entrance. In the early twentieth century, amusement parks were built at the end of trolley lines to encourage weekend ridership.

=== 1920–1939 ===
In the 1920s, the park had grown to include a nickelodeon movie theater, a "dancing casino", a steam-driven carousel, the Jack Rabbit roller coaster, and a "razzle-dazzle" ride. The Jack Rabbit coaster was considered state-of-the-art when added to the park in 1919 for the cost of $80,000 (equal to $1,485,605 today).

On June 22, 1931, a fire almost destroyed the amusement park. According to The New York Times, "a vivid pyrotechnic display and the successive reports of exploding cartridges added to the spectacular aspect of a fire which swept through part of Clementon Park, a South Jersey pleasure resort." The fire had reached the cartridge supply of the shooting gallery, setting off explosions. Firemen from six adjoining towns fought the fire, which was contained to the shooting gallery and a "pretzel ride". The damages were estimated to be $2,000.

On September 20, 1936, Philadelphian boxer Al Ettore trained at Clementon Park for the upcoming heavyweight title fight against Joe Louis. Many fans visited the park to see Ettore train, causing a 100-foot (30 m) section of grandstand to collapse under the weight of about 500 spectators. No one was seriously injured.

=== 1940–1969 ===
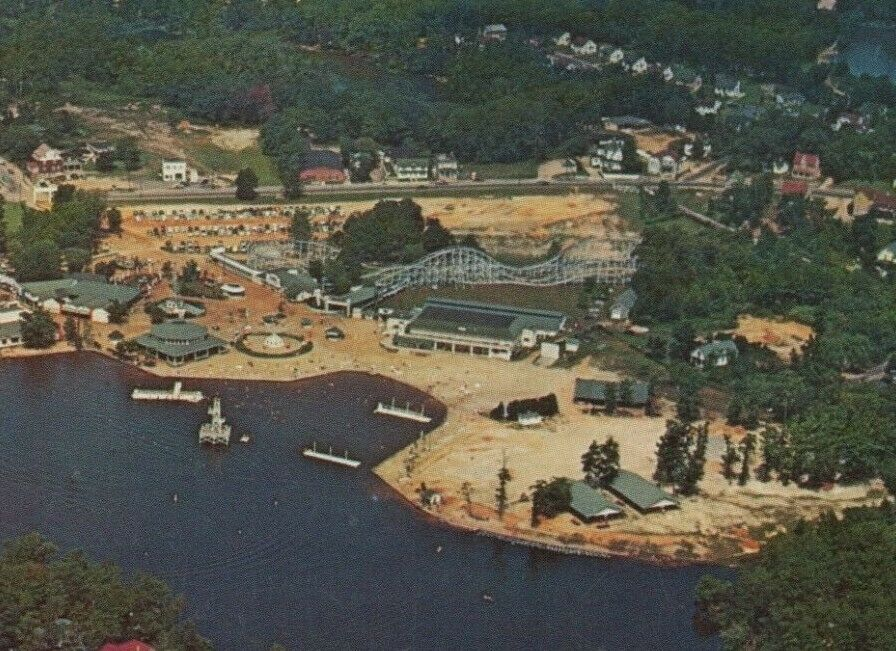
Clementon Park in the 1960s

Throughout the 1930s to the 1950s, Clementon Park's ballroom hosted dance marathons that were hosted by various celebrities such as Red Skelton and Dick Clark. Clementon Park survived the Great Depression by holding these marathons, offering a $100 prize to couples who lasted the longest.

=== 1970–1999 ===
In 1977, the Gibbs family sold Clementon Lake Park to Abram Baker. Baker owned a nightclub in Miami, Florida, and the Fascination Parlour in Atlantic City, New Jersey. From 1955 to 1968, he also owned Glen Echo Park, Maryland. In 1979, operation of the park was turned over to Larry Baker, Abram's son.

=== 2000–2019 ===
In 2007, the park was purchased by Adrenaline Family Entertainment for an undisclosed amount. Over the next three years, Adrenaline Family Entertainment made major renovations and added new attractions to the park. Laguna Kahuna, a large interactive water play area, was added in 2008, followed by Ring of Fire and Thunder Drop in 2010, and Torpedo Rush in 2011.

On November 21, 2011, the park was purchased by Gary Story and Kieran Burke of Premier Parks, LLC through a new subsidiary, Clementon Lake Holdings. Big Wave Bay, a 23,000 square foot (2,136 sq m) wave pool, was added for the 2012 season.

For the 2019 season, the park added four new rides: a swinging ship, a Tilt-A-Whirl, a Scrambler, and a children's coaster called Dragon Coaster. The coaster was relocated from Bowcraft Amusement Park in Scotch Plains, New Jersey, which had closed permanently the season beforehand.

=== 2020–2025 ===
On September 8, 2019, the park abruptly closed without warning (despite tickets having been sold for the next season's events), and other planned events later in the season were suddenly canceled.

Following the closure, TD Bank filed a lawsuit against the park owners for failing to make payments on a $4.5 million loan. On January 25, 2021, a court order granted Howard Samuels and Rally Capital Advisors receivership of the park.

On February 19, 2021, Capital Recovery Group, acting on behalf of its client, Howard Samuels, issued a press release announcing the sale of the park at a public auction to be held on March 23, 2021. During this time, it was also reported that a local investing group, Fresh Development, was in the process of raising the $7 million needed to purchase and reopen the park.

On March 23, 2021, the park auction commenced, and the park in its entirety was sold to an undisclosed buyer for $2,370,000. The buyer was quickly revealed to be real estate developer Gene Staples, who had bought and reopened the recently closed Indiana Beach amusement park in Monticello, Indiana, the year before. Clementon Park and Splash World reopened on June 25, 2021. All of the water park's attractions were open, but a limited number of the amusement rides were in operation. Discounted admission tickets were offered through end of June.

On September 9, 2026, it was announced that the park would not reopen for the 2027 season, with September 7 having been the park's last day in operation. Plans for the park to be sold were also announced.

== Attractions at time of closure ==
=== Roller coasters ===
Name	Year opened	Manufacturer	Type	Notes
Dragon Coaster	2019	Wisdom Rides	Steel children's roller coaster	Originally operated at Bowcraft Amusement Park from 1998 to 2018.
Hellcat	2004	S&S Power	Hybrid wooden roller coaster	Known as Tsunami in 2004 and J2 (which stood for Jack Rabbit 2) from 2005 to 2007. Currently closed pending renovations from Rocky Mountain Construction.

=== Thrill rides ===
Name	Year opened	Manufacturer	Type	Notes
King Neptune's Revenge	Unknown	Intamin	Log flume	Currently closed pending renovations
Flying Pharaoh	Unknown	Chance Rides	Swing ride	
Ring of Fire	2010	Larson International	Fire Ball	Currently closed pending renovations
Scrambler	2019	Eli Bridge Company	Scrambler	
Sea Dragon	2019	Chance Rides	Swinging ship	Currently closed pending renovations

=== Family rides ===
Name	Manufacturer	Type	Notes
C.P. Huntington Railway	Chance Rides	Rideable miniature railway	
Giant Gondola Wheel	Chance Rides	Ferris wheel	
Grand Carousel	Charles I. D. Looff/Dentzel Carousel Company/Stein & Goldstein	Carousel	Features a Wurlitzer style 153 band organ. Currently closed pending renovations.
Samba Tower	Zamperla	Balloon Race	Currently closed pending renovations
Tilt-A-Whirl	Sellner Manufacturing	Tilt-A-Whirl	

=== Children's rides ===
Name	Manufacturer	Type	Notes
Flying Elephants	Unknown	Spinning elephant ride	Currently closed pending renovations
Formula 3000	Unknown	Miniature vehicle ride	Currently closed pending renovations
Mini Pirate Ships	Unknown	Miniature swinging ship	
Round-A-Boats	Unknown	Spinning boat ride	
Safari Train	Unknown	Miniature train ride	
Space Age	Hampton Amusement Company	Spinning space ship ride	
Umbrella	Hampton Amusement Company	Spinning vehicle ride	

=== Water park attractions ===
Name	Type	Notes
Big Wave Bay	Wave pool	
Laguna Kahuna	Children's water play area with eight water slides and several water features	
Lazy River	Lazy river	
Shipwreck Bay/Kiddie Pool	Children's water play area with six water slides	
Sky River Rapids	Raft water slide	
Torpedo Rush	Two drop-launch water slides	Currently closed pending renovations
Vertical Limit	Multi-lane mat racer water slide	
Viper	Two raft water slides	

== Former attractions ==
=== Roller coasters ===
Name	Years operated	Year closed	Manufacturer	Type	Notes
Jack Rabbit	1919	2002	Philadelphia Toboggan Coasters/John A. Miller	Wooden roller coaster	Stood out of operation until 2007, when it was demolished

=== Thrill rides ===
Name	Years operated	Year closed	Manufacturer	Type
Chaos	1998	2007	Chance Rides	Chaos
Falling Star	1988	2007	Chance Rides	Falling Star
Inverter	2000	2009	Chance Rides	Inverter
Razzle-Dazzle	1920s	1920s	Unknown	Spinning ride
Thunder Drop	2010	2022	ARM Rides	Drop tower
Thunderbolt	1988	2009	Chance Rides	Matterhorn
Turtle Whirl	2000	2006	Sellner Manufacturing	Tilt-A-Whirl
