= Bowcraft Amusement Park =

Amusement park in New Jersey, United States

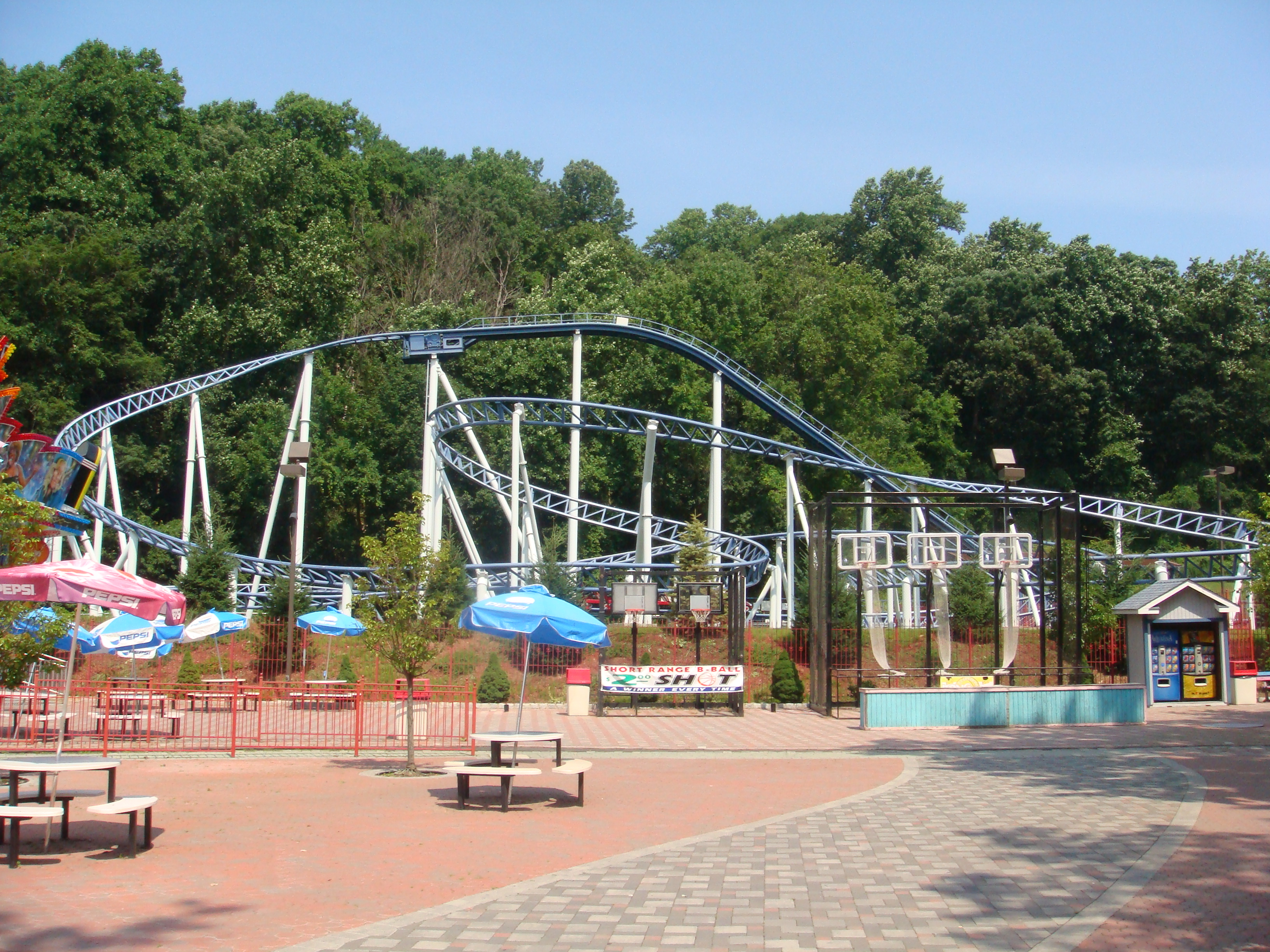
- Crossbow roller coaster of Bowcraft in 2009
- Interactive map of Bowcraft Amusement Park
- Location: Scotch Plains, New Jersey, USA
- Coordinates: 40.6654°N 74.3874°W
- Status: Defunct
- Opened: 1946
- Closed: October 2018
- Operating season: April–October

Attractions
- Total: 21
- Roller coasters: 2
- Water rides: 0

Bowcraft Amusement Park or Bowcraft Playland was a small amusement park located on U.S. Route 22 West in Scotch Plains, New Jersey. At the time of its closing, it contained 21 rides appropriate for both children and adults. Bowcraft Amusement Park was open weekends from May through October and daily June through Labor Day.

The park's history dates to 1946, when an archery and skiing enthusiast named Ted Miller opened a small archery and ski equipment store, complete with a small ski slope on-site, and named it Bowcraft Park.

In the 1980s, the park included a miniature golf course, which was eventually removed to make room for an overall expansion of both the park itself and the parking area.

The park offered a choice between purchasing tickets for individual rides, or an all-inclusive "Fun-Pass" which gives the ticket holder unlimited riding.

In 2016, a developer purchased the property with plans to demolish the park and build 190 apartments and 10 townhomes. The town of Scotch Plains scheduled a hearing to discuss the application for the planned property development on September 26, 2016. The park owners issued a statement saying that despite the planned development, closure was not imminent, and the park would open for the 2017 season in April as always. The park permanently ceased operations in October 2018 and in the following month, all official park websites and social media pages were deactivated, and the park's rides were put up for sale on various websites.

== Former Attractions/Rides ==
=== Kiddie Rides ===
- Merry Go Round
- Frog Hopper
- Helicopters
- Big Trucks
- Motorcycle Jump
- Kiddie Boats
- Pony Rides

=== Family Rides ===
- Balloon Ride
- Drop Zone
- Super Slide
- Train Xpress
- Speedway
- Popp
- Dragon Coaster (sold to Clementon Park and Splash World)
- Tilt A Whirl
- Bumper Cars

=== Thrill Rides ===
- Galleon Pirate Ship (sold to Alabama Splash Adventure)
- Muzik Express
- Paratrooper
- Scrambler
- Crossbow roller coaster (sold to Tosselilla Summer Park)
- The Swingin' Gym/Flying Cages

=== Other Attractions ===
Statue of Pinocchio at Bowcraft Amusement Park, NJ, 2013

Other attractions in the park included a children's play area, arcade, and midway carnival games.

== Film appearances ==
- The conclusion of the 1991 film Mortal Thoughts was filmed there, and the park is featured on the film's poster.
- The opening scene from the 1994 movie North was filmed at Bowcraft.
