= Paradise Dam =

Paradise Dam may refer to:

- Paradise Dam (Queensland), a dam in Australia
- Paradise Dam (Montana), an unbuilt dam project in Montana, USA
