= Paradise Lake (amusement park) =

- Interactive map of Paradise Lake
- Location: Guernsey County, Ohio, U.S.
- Coordinates: 40.04754°N 81.33792°W
- Status: Defunct
- Opened: 1981
- Closed: 1983

Paradise Lake was an amusement park in eastern Ohio, in the United States. The park was at the interchange of Interstate 70 with State Route 513, in rural Guernsey County, Ohio, between Quaker City and Fairview.

Paradise Lake was intended to be a major amusement park when it opened on 1 July 1981. The park was planned to cover 2,000 acres (8.1 km^{2}), but only 70 acres (280,000 m^{2}) were developed in the park's first, and only completed, phase. Paradise Lake operated for only two summers before the land and facilities were sold at auction on 18 October 1983. Paradise Lake marketing materials always included "A Phil Fry Enterprise" under the park name.

== The Paradises ==
There were four major areas of the park, each given the name paradise. Each "paradise" was given a different theme, making an overall park layout similar to other new amusement parks of the era (such as Busch Gardens Williamsburg).

=== Western Paradise ===
Western Paradise was designed to look like a town of the Old West. Some 20 buildings were built in this area of the park, representing establishments one might have seen in an archetypical Western town such as a church, sheriff's office, and leather-working shop. Also planned for the area were a stagecoach ride and train ride.

=== Space Paradise ===
Space Paradise was marketed as the "adult" section of the park, with attractions such as two roller coasters, two Ferris wheels, and a "bumper boat" attraction which operated much like bumper cars, but on water.

=== Children's Paradise ===
Children's Paradise included a smaller roller coaster and Ferris wheel, a whip ride, and two main attractions: Santa's Village, and an Enchanted Forest which was to be similar to the Story Book Forest at Idlewild Park in Ligonier, Pennsylvania.

=== Sports Paradise ===
Sports Paradise consisted of a hotel, a spa, an arcade, a campground, and a ski area. This was the only area of the park not covered by the general admission price; instead, attractions in this area were priced separately to allow for year-round operation.
