= Clementon School District =

School district in Camden County, New Jersey, US

Address
- 4 Audubon Avenue Clementon, Camden County, New Jersey, 08021
- Coordinates: 39.800914°N 74.991056°W

District information
- Grades: PreK-8
- Superintendent: Kathleen Haines
- Business administrator: Bruno Berenato
- Schools: 1

Students and staff
- Enrollment: 609 (as of 2023–24)
- Faculty: 64.7 FTEs
- Student–teacher ratio: 9.4:1

Other information
- District Factor Group: B
- Website: www.clemsd.org
Ind.	Per pupil	District spending	Rank (*)	K-8 average	%± vs. average
1A	Total Spending	$19,289	42	$18,891	2.1%
1	Budgetary Cost	13,834	28	14,159	−2.3%
2	Classroom Instruction	8,947	37	8,659	3.3%
6	Support Services	1,954	21	2,167	−9.8%
8	Administrative Cost	1,651	31	1,547	6.7%
10	Operations & Maintenance	1,033	6	1,612	−35.9%
13	Extracurricular Activities	116	31	104	11.5%
16	Median Teacher Salary	55,550	15	61,136
Data from NJDoE 2014 Taxpayers' Guide to Education Spending. *Of K-8 districts with 401-750 students. Lowest spending=1; Highest=64

The Clementon School District is a community public school district that serves students in pre-kindergarten through eighth grade from Clementon, in Camden County, in the U.S. state of New Jersey.

As of the 2023–24 school year, the district, comprised of one school, had an enrollment of 609 students and 64.7 classroom teachers (on an FTE basis), for a student–teacher ratio of 9.4:1.

The district had been classified by the New Jersey Department of Education as being in District Factor Group "B", the second-lowest of eight groupings. District Factor Groups organize districts statewide to allow comparison by common socioeconomic characteristics of the local districts. From lowest socioeconomic status to highest, the categories are A, B, CD, DE, FG, GH, I and J.

Public school students in ninth through twelfth grades attend Overbrook High School in Pine Hill as part of a sending/receiving relationship with the Pine Hill Schools. The high school also serves the community of Berlin Township as part of a sending/receiving relationship. A representative from Clementon serves on the board of education of the Pine Hill Schools. As of the 2023–24 school year, the high school had an enrollment of 846 students and 59.3 classroom teachers (on an FTE basis), for a student–teacher ratio of 14.3:1.

== School ==
Clementon Elementary School had an enrollment of 596 students in grades PreK-8 as of the 2023–24 school year. Members of the school's administration are:

- Jared Fudurich, principal

== Administration ==
Core members of the district's administration include:

- Kathleen Haines, superintendent
- Bruno Berenato, business administrator and board secretary

== Board of education ==
The district's board of education, comprised of nine members, sets policy and oversees the fiscal and educational operation of the district through its administration. As a Type II school district, the board's trustees are elected directly by voters to serve three-year terms of office on a staggered basis, with three seats up for election each year held (since 2012) as part of the November general election. The board appoints a superintendent to oversee the district's day-to-day operations and a business administrator to supervise the business functions of the district.
