= Clementon, New Jersey =

Borough in Camden County, New Jersey, US

- Borough
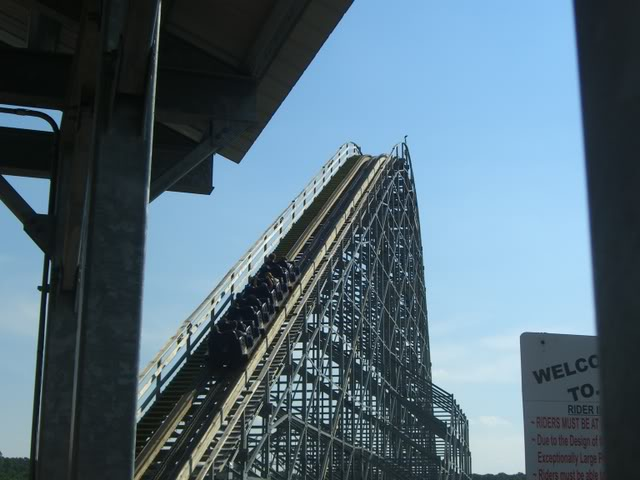
- Hell Cat at Clementon Park and Splash World within the borough

- Seal

- Location of Clementon in Camden County highlighted in red (right). Inset map: Location of Camden County in New Jersey highlighted in orange (left).

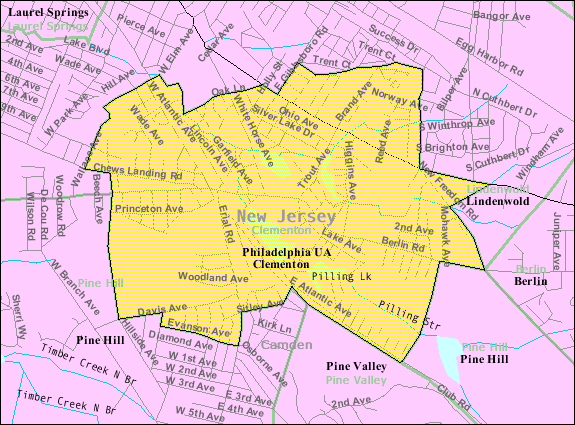
- Census Bureau map showing location of Clementon within Camden County. Inset: Location of Camden County in New Jersey.

- Location in Camden County Location in New Jersey Location in the United States
- Coordinates: 39.802681°N 74.983763°W
- Country: United States
- State: New Jersey
- County: Camden
- Incorporated: March 17, 1925
- Named after: Samuel Clement

Government
  - Type: Borough (New Jersey)
  - Body: Borough Council
  - Mayor: Thomas J. Weaver (D, term ends December 31, 2027)
  - Administrator / Municipal clerk: Jenai Johnson

Area
  - Total: 1.95 sq mi (5.05 km^{2})
  - Land: 1.89 sq mi (4.90 km^{2})
  - Water: 0.058 sq mi (0.15 km^{2}) 2.97%
  - Rank: 416th of 565 in state 18th of 37 in county
- Elevation: 72 ft (22 m)

Population (2020)
  - Total: 5,338
  - Estimate (2023): 5,465
  - Rank: 367th of 565 in state 23rd of 37 in county
  - Density: 2,819.9/sq mi (1,088.8/km^{2})
  - Rank: 231st of 565 in state 26th of 37 in county
- Time zone: UTC−05:00 (Eastern (EST))
  - Summer (DST): UTC−04:00 (Eastern (EDT))
- ZIP Code: 08021
- Area code: 856
- FIPS code: 3400713420
- GNIS feature ID: 0885186
- Website: www.clementon-nj.com

Clementon is a borough in Camden County, in the southern portion of the U.S. state of New Jersey. As of the 2020 United States census, the borough's population was 5,338, its highest decennial census count ever and an increase of 338 (+6.8%) from the 2010 census count of 5,000, which in turn had reflected an increase of 14 (+0.3%) from the 4,986 counted at the 2000 census.

The borough had the 27th-highest property tax rate in New Jersey, with an equalized rate of 4.179% in 2020, compared to 3.470% in the county as a whole and a statewide average of 2.279%.

== History ==
Around 1800, Jonathon Haines built a glass factory in what is now Clementon, situated on a large hill across the street from the modern day Clementon Park. Large amounts of dirt, gravel and marl from the large hill the glass works were situated on were removed for use at a planned new post office in 1961. Sometime around 1811, Samuel Clement of Haddonfield purchased the glass works and named them the Gloucester Glass works, and named the small settlement around the plant as Clementon village. Haines remained as a superintendent and at some point repurchased the works from Clement.

The Borough of Clementon was created on February 13, 1925, from Clementon Township, one of nine municipalities created from the now-defunct township, based on the results of a referendum held on March 17, 1925.

== Geography ==
According to the United States Census Bureau, the borough had a total area of 1.95 square miles (5.05 km^{2}), including 1.89 square miles (4.90 km^{2}) of land and 0.06 square miles (0.15 km^{2}) of water (2.97%).

The borough is located on Clementon Lake, which is the site of the Clementon Amusement Park. The amusement park was home to the Jack Rabbit, a wooden roller coaster constructed in 1919 by the Philadelphia Toboggan Company. Though quite tame in comparison to modern steel coasters, it remained popular with park visitors. It was one of the oldest remaining coasters in the country when it was taken out of service in 2002 and ultimately demolished in 2007.

Rowands Pond Wildlife Management Area, covering 12.98 acres (5.25 ha), is located in Clementon.

Unincorporated communities, localities and place names located partially or completely within the borough include Brownsville and Gordon Lake.

Clementon borders Berlin Borough, Lindenwold, Pine Hill and Pine Valley.

== Demographics ==
Historical population
Census	Pop.	Note	%±
1910	2,794		—
1920	3,491		24.9%
1930	2,605		−25.4%
1940	2,866		10.0%
1950	3,191		11.3%
1960	3,766		18.0%
1970	4,492		19.3%
1980	5,764		28.3%
1990	5,601		−2.8%
2000	4,986		−11.0%
2010	5,000		0.3%
2020	5,338		6.8%
2023 (est.)	5,465	▲	2.4%
Population sources:1910–2000 1910 1910–1930; 1940–2000 2000; 2010 2020

=== 2020 census ===
As of the 2020 census, Clementon had a population of 5,338. The median age was 38.0 years. 21.7% of residents were under the age of 18 and 14.9% of residents were 65 years of age or older. For every 100 females there were 94.7 males, and for every 100 females age 18 and over there were 93.0 males age 18 and over.

100.0% of residents lived in urban areas, while 0.0% lived in rural areas.

There were 2,207 households in Clementon, of which 28.7% had children under the age of 18 living in them. Of all households, 31.5% were married-couple households, 24.7% were households with a male householder and no spouse or partner present, and 34.5% were households with a female householder and no spouse or partner present. About 33.6% of all households were made up of individuals and 13.5% had someone living alone who was 65 years of age or older.

There were 2,394 housing units, of which 7.8% were vacant. The homeowner vacancy rate was 1.9% and the rental vacancy rate was 5.7%.

Racial composition as of the 2020 census
Race	Number	Percent
White	2,900	54.3%
Black or African American	1,252	23.5%
American Indian and Alaska Native	29	0.5%
Asian	144	2.7%
Native Hawaiian and Other Pacific Islander	0	0.0%
Some other race	538	10.1%
Two or more races	475	8.9%
Hispanic or Latino (of any race)	944	17.7%

=== 2010 census ===
The 2010 United States census counted 5,000 people, 2,064 households, and 1,226 families in the borough. The population density was 2,612.0 per square mile (1,008.5/km^{2}). There were 2,235 housing units at an average density of 1,167.6 per square mile (450.8/km^{2}). The racial makeup was 71.28% (3,564) White, 19.12% (956) Black or African American, 0.56% (28) Native American, 2.10% (105) Asian, 0.00% (0) Pacific Islander, 3.90% (195) from other races, and 3.04% (152) from two or more races. Hispanic or Latino of any race were 10.30% (515) of the population.

Of the 2,064 households, 26.5% had children under the age of 18; 36.5% were married couples living together; 16.6% had a female householder with no husband present and 40.6% were non-families. Of all households, 33.2% were made up of individuals and 10.6% had someone living alone who was 65 years of age or older. The average household size was 2.42 and the average family size was 3.10.

22.0% of the population were under the age of 18, 10.4% from 18 to 24, 28.0% from 25 to 44, 28.6% from 45 to 64, and 11.0% who were 65 years of age or older. The median age was 37.2 years. For every 100 females, the population had 94.3 males. For every 100 females ages 18 and older there were 90.6 males.

The Census Bureau's 2006–2010 American Community Survey showed that (in 2010 inflation-adjusted dollars) median household income was $40,185 (with a margin of error of +/− $4,676) and the median family income was $57,184 (+/− $7,155). Males had a median income of $40,987 (+/− $7,918) versus $34,063 (+/− $3,762) for females. The per capita income for the borough was $22,597 (+/− $2,393). About 7.8% of families and 13.5% of the population were below the poverty line, including 20.3% of those under age 18 and 7.3% of those age 65 or over.

=== 2000 census ===
As of the 2000 United States census there were 4,986 people, 1,978 households, and 1,246 families residing in the borough. The population density was 2,636.3 inhabitants per square mile (1,017.9/km^{2}). There were 2,206 housing units at an average density of 1,166.4 per square mile (450.3/km^{2}). The racial makeup of the borough was 82.23% White, 11.57% African American, 0.22% Native American, 0.92% Asian, 0.18% Pacific Islander, 2.35% from other races, and 2.53% from two or more races. 4.13% of the population were Hispanic or Latino of any race.

There were 1,978 households, out of which 30.3% had children under the age of 18 living with them, 40.8% were married couples living together, 15.4% had a female householder with no husband present, and 37.0% were non-families. 29.5% of all households were made up of individuals, and 9.9% had someone living alone who was 65 years of age or older. The average household size was 2.52 and the average family size was 3.13.

In the borough the population was spread out, with 24.7% under the age of 18, 8.6% from 18 to 24, 33.5% from 25 to 44, 22.1% from 45 to 64, and 11.1% who were 65 years of age or older. The median age was 35 years. For every 100 females, there were 93.3 males. For every 100 females age 18 and over, there were 90.5 males.

The median income for a household in the borough was $42,207, and the median income for a family was $50,963. Males had a median income of $33,879 versus $29,777 for females. The per capita income for the borough was $18,510. 11.4% of the population and 9.3% of families were below the poverty line. Out of the total population, 12.6% of those under the age of 18 and 14.8% of those 65 and older were living below the poverty line.

== Economy ==
Clementon is home to Giambri's Quality Sweets, a long-established candy and chocolate maker that was founded in South Philadelphia in 1942 and moved to New Jersey in the early 1970s.

== Government ==
=== Local government ===
Clementon is governed under the borough form of New Jersey municipal government, which is used in 218 municipalities (of the 564) statewide, making it the most common form of government in New Jersey. The governing body is comprised of a mayor and a borough council, with all positions elected at-large on a partisan basis as part of the November general election. A mayor is elected directly by the voters to a four-year term of office. The borough council includes six members elected to serve three-year terms on a staggered basis, with two seats coming up for election each year in a three-year cycle. The borough form of government used by Clementon is a "weak mayor / strong council" government in which council members act as the legislative body with the mayor presiding at meetings and voting only in the event of a tie. The mayor can veto ordinances subject to an override by a two-thirds majority vote of the council. The mayor makes committee and liaison assignments for council members, and most appointments are made by the mayor with the advice and consent of the council. A council president is selected annually from among their own members by the council and presides in the absence of the mayor. The council has all executive responsibilities not specifically assigned to the mayor.

As of 2024, the mayor of the Borough of Clementon is Democrat Thomas J. Weaver, whose term of office ends December 31, 2027. Members of the Clementon Borough Council are Gwendolyn Cantwell (D, 2025), Robert L. Dorsey (D, 2024), Jonathan M. Fisher (D, 2026), Christopher McKelvey (D, 2024; elected to an unexpired term), Christine A. Nucera (D, 2026) and Thomas Shaw (D, 2025).

=== Federal, state and county representation ===
Clementon is located in the 1st Congressional District and is part of New Jersey's 6th state legislative district.

For the 119th United States Congress, New Jersey's 1st congressional district is represented by Donald Norcross (D, Camden). New Jersey is represented in the United States Senate by Democrats Cory Booker (Newark, term ends 2027) and Andy Kim (Moorestown, term ends 2031).

For the 2026–2027 session, the 6th legislative district of the New Jersey Legislature is represented in the State Senate by James Beach (D, Voorhees Township) and in the General Assembly by Louis Greenwald (D, Voorhees Township) and Melinda Kane (D, Cherry Hill).

Camden County is governed by a Board of County Commissioners composed of seven members chosen at-large in partisan elections for three-year terms on a staggered basis by the residents of the county, with either two or three seats up for election each year as part of the November general election. At a reorganization meeting held in January after each election, the newly constituted Board of Commissioners selects one member to serve as Director and another as Deputy Director, each serving a one-year term in that role. As of 2025, Camden County's Commissioners are: Commissioner Director Louis Cappelli Jr. (D, Collingswood, 2026), Commissioner Deputy Director Edward T. McDonnell (D, Pennsauken Township, 2025), Virginia Ruiz Betteridge (D, Runnemede, 2025), Almar Dyer (D, Pennsauken Township, 2027), Melinda Kane (D, Cherry Hill, 2027), Jeffrey L. Nash (D, Winslow Township, 2027), and Jonathan L. Young Sr. (D, Berlin Township, 2026).

Camden County's constitutional officers are: Clerk Pamela Rosen Lampitt (D, Cherry Hill, 2029) Sheriff Chuck Billingham (D, Gloucester City, 2027) and Surrogate Michelle Gentek-Mayer (D, Gloucester Township, 2025).

=== Politics ===
As of March 2011, there were a total of 2,945 registered voters in Clementon, of which 1,063 (36.1%) were registered as Democrats, 407 (13.8%) were registered as Republicans and 1,472 (50.0%) were registered as Unaffiliated. There were 3 voters registered as Libertarians or Greens.

Gubernatorial election results for Clementon
Year	Republican		Democratic		Third party(ies)	
Year	No.	%	No.	%	No.	%
2025	541	31.92%	1,143	67.43%	11	0.65%
2021	495	40.31%	718	58.47%	15	1.22%
2017	354	36.09%	602	61.37%	25	2.55%
2013	638	58.32%	430	39.31%	26	2.38%
2009	468	42.74%	529	48.31%	98	8.95%
2005	407	35.92%	669	59.05%	57	5.03%

In the 2012 presidential election, Democrat Barack Obama received 67.6% of the vote (1,316 cast), ahead of Republican Mitt Romney with 31.2% (607 votes), and other candidates with 1.3% (25 votes), among the 1,970 ballots cast by the borough's 3,289 registered voters (22 ballots were spoiled), for a turnout of 59.9%. In the 2008 presidential election, Democrat Barack Obama received 61.9% of the vote (1,276 cast), ahead of Republican John McCain, who received around 33.9% (700 votes), with 2,063 ballots cast among the borough's 3,049 registered voters, for a turnout of 67.7%. In the 2004 presidential election, Democrat John Kerry received 60.7% of the vote (1,183 ballots cast), outpolling Republican George W. Bush, who received around 37.0% (721 votes), with 1,949 ballots cast among the borough's 2,780 registered voters, for a turnout percentage of 70.1.

United States presidential election results for Clementon
Year	Republican		Democratic		Third party(ies)	
Year	No.	%	No.	%	No.	%
2024	834	37.72%	1,339	60.56%	38	1.72%
2020	827	35.39%	1,473	63.03%	37	1.58%
2016	712	36.57%	1,155	59.32%	80	4.11%
2012	607	31.16%	1,316	67.56%	25	1.28%
2008	700	33.93%	1,276	61.85%	87	4.22%
2004	721	36.99%	1,183	60.70%	45	2.31%

In the 2013 gubernatorial election, Republican Chris Christie received 58.3% of the vote (638 cast), ahead of Democrat Barbara Buono with 39.3% (430 votes), and other candidates with 2.4% (26 votes), among the 1,141 ballots cast by the borough's 3,379 registered voters (47 ballots were spoiled), for a turnout of 33.8%. In the 2009 gubernatorial election, Democrat Jon Corzine received 48.3% of the vote (529 ballots cast), ahead of both Republican Chris Christie with 42.7% (468 votes) and Independent Chris Daggett with 5.8% (63 votes), with 1,095 ballots cast among the borough's 2,950 registered voters, yielding a 37.1% turnout.

United States Senate election results for Clementon1
Year	Republican		Democratic		Third party(ies)	
Year	No.	%	No.	%	No.	%
2024	755	35.30%	1,343	62.79%	41	1.92%
2018	588	39.38%	807	54.05%	98	6.56%
2012	544	29.45%	1,271	68.81%	32	1.73%
2006	392	37.80%	595	57.38%	50	4.82%

United States Senate election results for Clementon2
Year	Republican		Democratic		Third party(ies)	
Year	No.	%	No.	%	No.	%
2020	799	34.44%	1,477	63.66%	44	1.90%
2014	371	35.13%	665	62.97%	20	1.89%
2013	243	42.19%	320	55.56%	13	2.26%
2008	631	33.40%	1,229	65.06%	29	1.54%

== Education ==
The Clementon School District serves public school students in pre-kindergarten through eighth grade at Clementon Elementary School. As of the 2022–23 school year, the district, comprised of one school, had an enrollment of 589 students and 58.1 classroom teachers (on an FTE basis), for a student–teacher ratio of 10.1:1.

Public school students in ninth through twelfth grades attend Overbrook High School in Pine Hill as part of a sending/receiving relationship with the Pine Hill Schools. The high school also serves the community of Berlin Township as part of a sending/receiving relationship. As of the 2022–23 school year, the high school had an enrollment of 792 students and 60.9 classroom teachers (on an FTE basis), for a student–teacher ratio of 13.0:1.

== Transportation ==
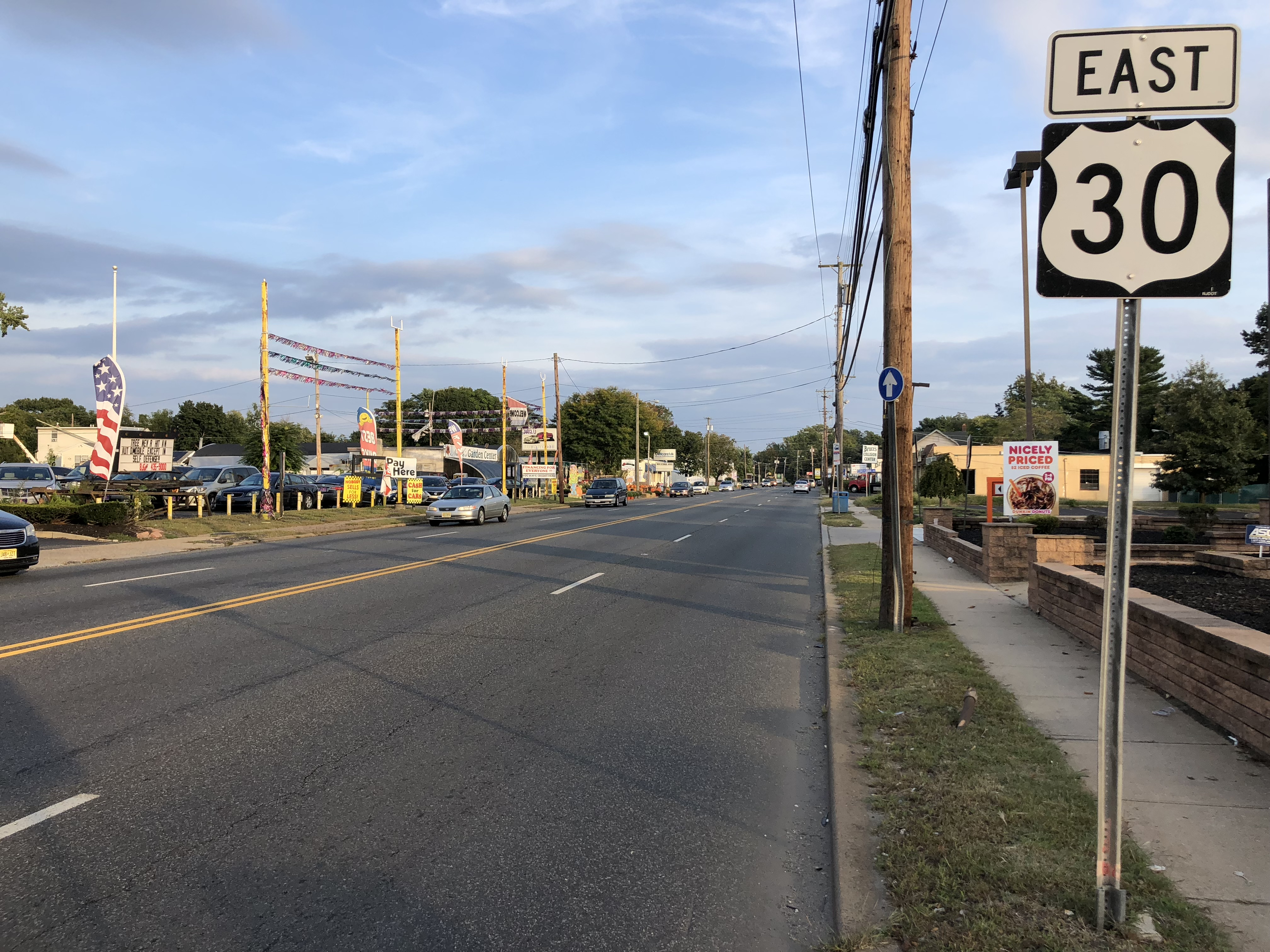
U.S. Route 30 eastbound in Clementon

=== Roads and highways ===
As of May 2010, the borough had a total of 23.91 miles (38.48 km) of roadways, of which 15.10 miles (24.30 km) were maintained by the municipality, 7.82 miles (12.59 km) by Camden County and 0.99 miles (1.59 km) by the New Jersey Department of Transportation.

U.S. Route 30 (White Horse Pike) is the main highway serving Clementon.

=== Public transportation ===
NJ Transit bus service is provided on the 403 route between Turnersville and Camden, as well as between the Lindenwold station and Atlantic City on the 554 route.

== Notable people ==
People who were born in, residents of, or otherwise closely associated with Clementon include:

- Arthur Rose Eldred (1895–1951), agricultural and railroad industry executive, civic leader, and the first Eagle Scout in the Boy Scouts of America
- Arnie Fisher (born 1938), professional bridge player, bridge author, university instructor and businessman
- Walter E. Pedersen (1911–1998), politician and businessman who served as mayor of Clementon and in the New Jersey General Assembly
