= Arto Monaco =

Arto Monaco (November 15, 1913 in Elizabethtown, New York – November 21, 2003 in Upper Jay, New York) was an artist, theme park designer, toy designer, and cartoonist. Arto is buried in Mountain View Cemetery located in Upper Jay. His mother was Ida Martin. He is the son of Louis B. Monaco, an Italian immigrant; restaurant owner and entrepreneur. In 1941, he married Glad Burrell of Au Sable Forks, New York.

Rockwell Kent helped him go to Pratt Institute in Brooklyn, he graduated in 1937. While at Pratt, he was given a job for Hays Committee in NYC that rated movies. John Steinbeck and Lewis Milestone had a house in Jay, NY and they encouraged him to go to Hollywood.

After graduating from Pratt, he worked at Hollywood, MGM, Paramount, Warner Brothers, and Disney Studios for about four years, until enlisting in the army in 1941.

He worked for Warner Brothers Studio in Hollywood for a short time. While working in Hollywood, Arto moonlighted as an interior decorator, working for Fannie Brice, Ray Milland, Charlie Chaplin, and others. He worked for Hasbro, Mattel, and Ideal Toy Company, designing prototype models for games, toys, and educational activities.

He enlisted into the Army in 1941. While in the army, he developed training aids; he helped set up the first Training Aids Division M in Aberdeen, Maryland. He set up a German village for training soldiers for street fighting with an old movie set from 1925. It was called Annadorf, in San Claus, California. It is west of Santa Clarita Mountains.

As a master sergeant, he moved to Camp Santa Anita, a horse track turned army base. He was awarded the Legion of Merit in recognition of his leadership October 22, 1943. He appeared in the Army-Navy Screen Magazine #24, captioned "Strictly G.I. The Sergeant Shows 'Em How."

Shortly after WW2, he was asked by his old colonel, Bill James, to work help refurbish Lake Arrowhead Resort, Lake Arrowhead, California, as a Swiss-style resort village.

In the early 1950s, he set up his own business with his brother, Jim Monaco, and wife Glad in an old hotel of his father. Arto Monaco Toys made wooden and educational toys. When his theme park closed in 1979, he went back to designing toys and parks. He did freelance work for movie studios over the years.

Arto assisted with the designing of Disneyland in Anaheim, California.

== Parks ==
Arto designed Santa's Workshop, North Pole Park in Wilmington, New York. The park was constructed in 1947 and opened in 1949, the owner was Julian Reiss. This was his first theme park design. He was a partner in the development of the park.

In the early 1950s Arto designed Old MacDonald's Farm in Lake Placid, New York; it was a smaller park & only stayed open for a few years. The buildings were used for a summer camp for underprivileged kids from New York City. The camp is run by the Julian Reiss Foundation.

Parts of Storytown Park in Lake George were designed by Arto. Storytown is owned by Charley Wood. Storytown is now part of Great Escape. After the devastating flood in 1979, storybook cottages, buildings from Cactus Flats, Arto's train, and the miniature steam train were purchased for Storytown, USA aka Great Escape. Arto designed parts of Ghost Town, which is part of the Great Escape.

In 1952, Arto was a consultant and designed some parts for Frontier Town in North Hudson, New York. The park opened in 1952.

Arto designed and ran the Land of MakeBelieve. It was built for kids and opened 1953 in Upper Jay, NY. The park closed in 1979 after a flood ravaged the area. While open, it flooded 11 times, with Arto rebuilding it each time it flooded until the flood in 1979. It was known as "Arto's Field of Dreams." Arto's business partner was Kathryn Cameron.

Arto was a consultant for Story Land, Glen, New Hampshire, which opened in 1954. It was owned by Bob and Ruth Morrell. Their children, Stoney and Nancy, took over operations in the 80's until 2006 when Stoney died. Nancy merged the park with Kennywood Entertainment Company family of theme parks in 2007.

Arto was a consultant for Adventure Town, Alexandria Bay, New York. It opened in the summer of 1955 and closed on Labor Day, 1961.

Arto designed Gaslight Village in Lake George, owned by Charley Wood. The park opened in 1956.

Arto was a consultant for the Enchanted Forest Park in Old Forge, New York. The park opened in 1956.

Arto was a consultant to Montreal's Expo'67 World's Fair, which was at La Ronde Amusement Park.

Arto designed parts of Fantasy Island in Grand Island, New York. He designed and built a fairy castle for the park, after Charlie Wood acquired it in 1982.

In the early 1990s, he helped Paul Newman and Charlie Wood of Lake George with a new camp for critically ill children, called Double-H Hole in the Woods Ranch at Lake Luzerne. He painted a mural around the indoor swimming pool. He also helped a local developer, Mickey Danielle, to design a children's camp in Jay, NY for families of children with growth disorders.

== Film ==
The Katzenjammer Kids, "The Captain and the Kids Cleaning House", 1938. MGM cartoon he worked on when he first went to Hollywood. He worked on the following scenes: mama sweeping, captain scrubbing the floor, kids planning to operate on captain and them completely wrecking the hose, closing scenes of kids eating ice cream while captain is being punished by mama. He also worked on the stork and Charlie McCarthy scenes.

"The Strawberry Roan film," 1948

He worked with Friz Freleng, who came over from Warner Brothers, and William Hanna, later of Hanna-Barbera fame.

Fire in the Sky TV film, special effects 1978

"When Nature Calls," Visual effects, 1985. Arto created miniatures for the show, aka the Outdoorsters.

== Other works ==
Arto's mural of a Canadian hunting party and was painted in 1940 on the wall of the Local Village Inn. It was 7 ½ feet by 7 ½ feet. It is currently in poor condition.

Arto designed Holiday Harbor - Harbor Theater, Lake Placid, New York. Quigley Publication awarded Harbor Theater the Best Design of the Year Award 1969-70. NY Senator Stafford presented the award to Mr. Schwartz & Arto Monaco.

Arto illustrated 17 books and he continued making games and toys; some which he gave as gifts. He donated whimsical furniture to the libraries in Upper Jay & Au Sable Forks for the children's sections.

Some of the books he illustrated are: "Coloring Book of Atlanta," Atlanta News Agency 1969, "Tom-Tyler tales # 1" and "Tom-Tyler Tales Too #2," the "Adirondack Cowboy."

He also illustrated "Jack Jingles Wish: a real adventure on Santa's Workshop." Publisher New York: Rand McNally January, 1953

Arto designed the prototype for many toys, including Hungry Hungry Hippo, Original Transformers, Rockem Sockem Robots, and Othello.

== Features ==
- "Popular Science," Aug 1955
- "Popular Science," November 1949
- Fun World Magazine, November 2004
- "Amusement Parks of New York"
- "Images of America, Kiddie Parks of the Adirondacks"
- "The Arto Monaco Story, A Castle in Every Heart," Mountain Lake PBS
- "Remembering Arto Monaco," North Country Public Radio NCPR Radio
- "Arto Monaco the King of MakeBelieve," North Country Public Radio NCPR Radio
- "Arto Monaco Story," North Country Public Radio NCPR Radio
- "Arto Monaco", a song written by Monsterbuck.
- Items from Arto's Land of MakeBelieve, his drawings, toys and models he created were exhibited at the Adirondack Center Museum in Elizabethtown, NY August - October 1991
- Rosenberg Gallery, Adirondack History Center, in Elizabethtown, New York, exhibited Arto Monaco toys in 2001

== Awards/Recognitions ==
- Legion of Merit
- Past President of Kiwanis, Adirondack Division
- Rotary honored him as Citizen of the Year, October 16, 1969.
- Was appointed by Gov. Rockefeller in 1962, Commissioner of the Adirondack Mountain Authority
- Appointed by Gov Rockefeller as commissioner of the Olympic ski center at Whiteface Mountain
- He was fire commissioner for Upper Jay, NY
- Member of Adirondack Attractions Association; Land of Make Believe was a charter member
- President of Adirondack Attractions Association
- Member of International Association of Amusement Parks and Attractions (IAAPA)
- 2008 inductee to the IAAPA Hall of Fame
- IAAPA Hall of Fame video
