= Silver Comet (roller coaster) =

Ride at Niagara Amusement Park & Splash World

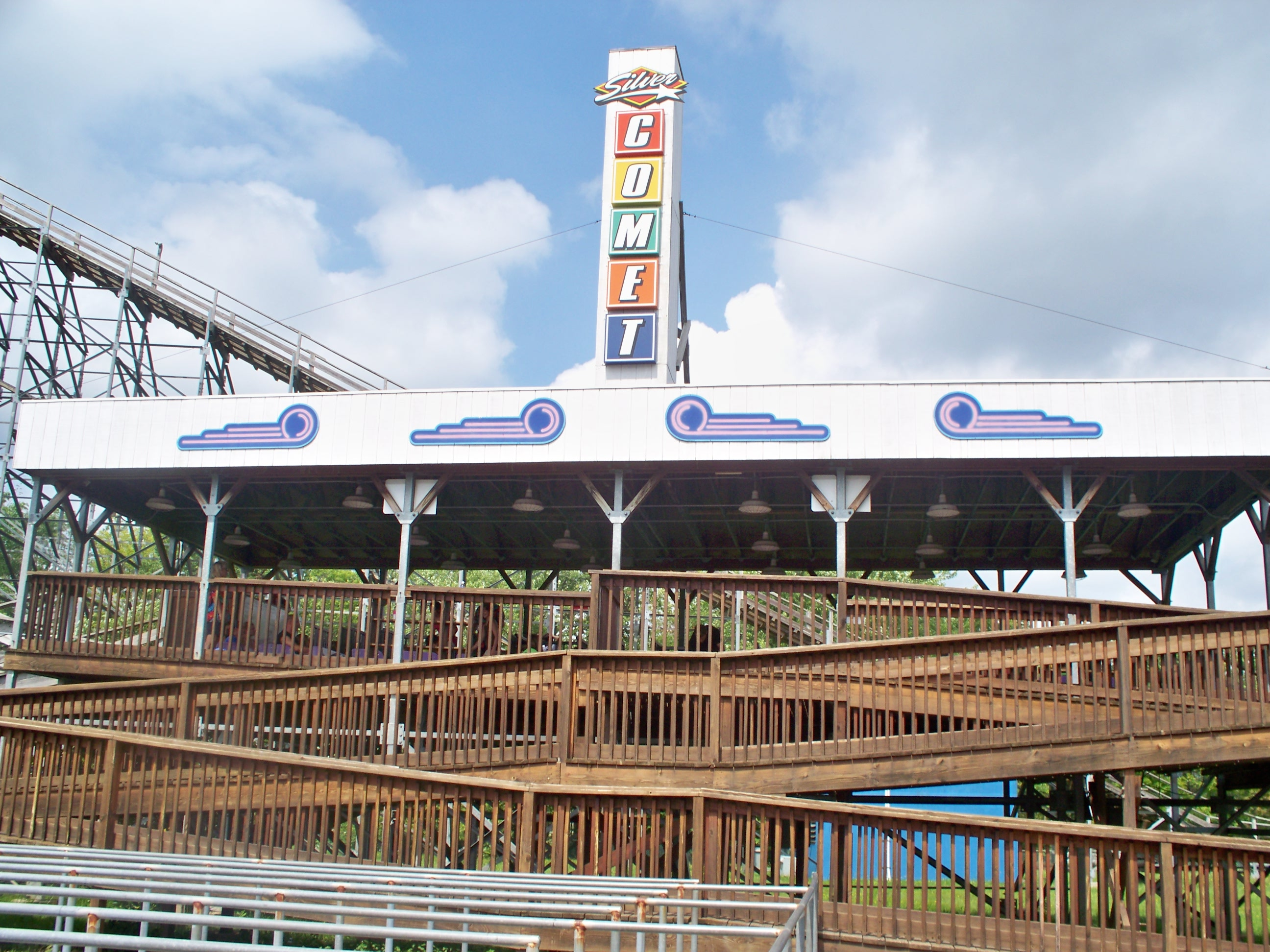
- The ride's queue and station in 2009

Niagara Amusement Park & Splash World
- Location: Niagara Amusement Park & Splash World
- Coordinates: 43°01′42″N 78°58′26″W
- Status: Closed
- Opening date: May 1, 1999
- Closing date: September 22, 2025

General statistics
- Type: Wood
- Manufacturer: Custom Coasters International
- Designer: Larry Bill
- Track layout: Triple out-and-back
- Lift/launch system: Chain lift
- Drop: 82 ft (25 m)
- Length: 2,800 ft (850 m)
- Speed: 50 mph (80 km/h)
- Duration: 1:45
- Max vertical angle: 50°
- Height restriction: 48 in (122 cm)
- Trains: Single train with 6 cars; riders arranged 2 across in 2 rows for a total of 24 riders per train
- Silver Comet at RCDB

Silver Comet is a wooden roller coaster located at Niagara Amusement Park & Splash World in Grand Island, New York, United States. It was built by Custom Coasters International and opened to the public on May 1, 1999. The hybrid coaster features wooden track with a steel support structure. Its layout was inspired by The Comet at Great Escape, which had previously spent several years in storage at the park following its acquisition by the owner of both parks.

The coaster did not operate in 2020 and 2021 following the closure of the park, but resumed operation in 2022 after the property was purchased and reopened. The park closed again following the 2025 season and announced in 2026 that it would not reopen, leaving the coaster inactive.

== Ride experience ==
Silver Comet's lift hill in 2009

After leaving the station, the train enters a short drop into a left-hand U-turn toward the 82-foot (25 m) lift hill. It then descends the first drop, turns slightly left, and traverses two airtime hills. A larger hill leads into a wide banked left turn and a small drop.

The train then turns slightly right and descends another large drop before entering a right-hand U-turn. It traverses two more airtime hills, separated by right and left turns, followed by a drop and a series of smaller airtime hills. After a left turn, the train passes through several additional drops and rises before entering the brake run, which runs parallel to the lift hill. A final small drop leads back into the station.

== Train ==
The ride has one six-car train, with each car seating four riders in rows of two, for a total of 24 riders per train. Each car contains individual ratcheting lap bars, individual seat belts, and seat dividers. The train was built by Philadelphia Toboggan Coasters.

== Awards ==
Golden Ticket Awards: Top wood Roller Coasters
| Year | | | | | | | | | 1998 | 1999 |
|---|---|---|---|---|---|---|---|---|---|---|
| Ranking | | | | | | | | | – | – |
| Year | 2000 | 2001 | 2002 | 2003 | 2004 | 2005 | 2006 | 2007 | 2008 | 2009 |
| Ranking | – | – | – | – | – | – | 35 | – | – | – |
| Year | 2010 | 2011 | 2012 | 2013 | 2014 | 2015 | 2016 | 2017 | 2018 | 2019 |
| Ranking | – | – | – | – | – | – | – | – | – | – |
| Year | 2020 | 2021 | 2022 | 2023 | 2024 | 2025 | 2026 | | | |
| Ranking | N/A | – | – | – | – | – | – | | | |
