= Hybrid roller coaster =

Category of roller coasters

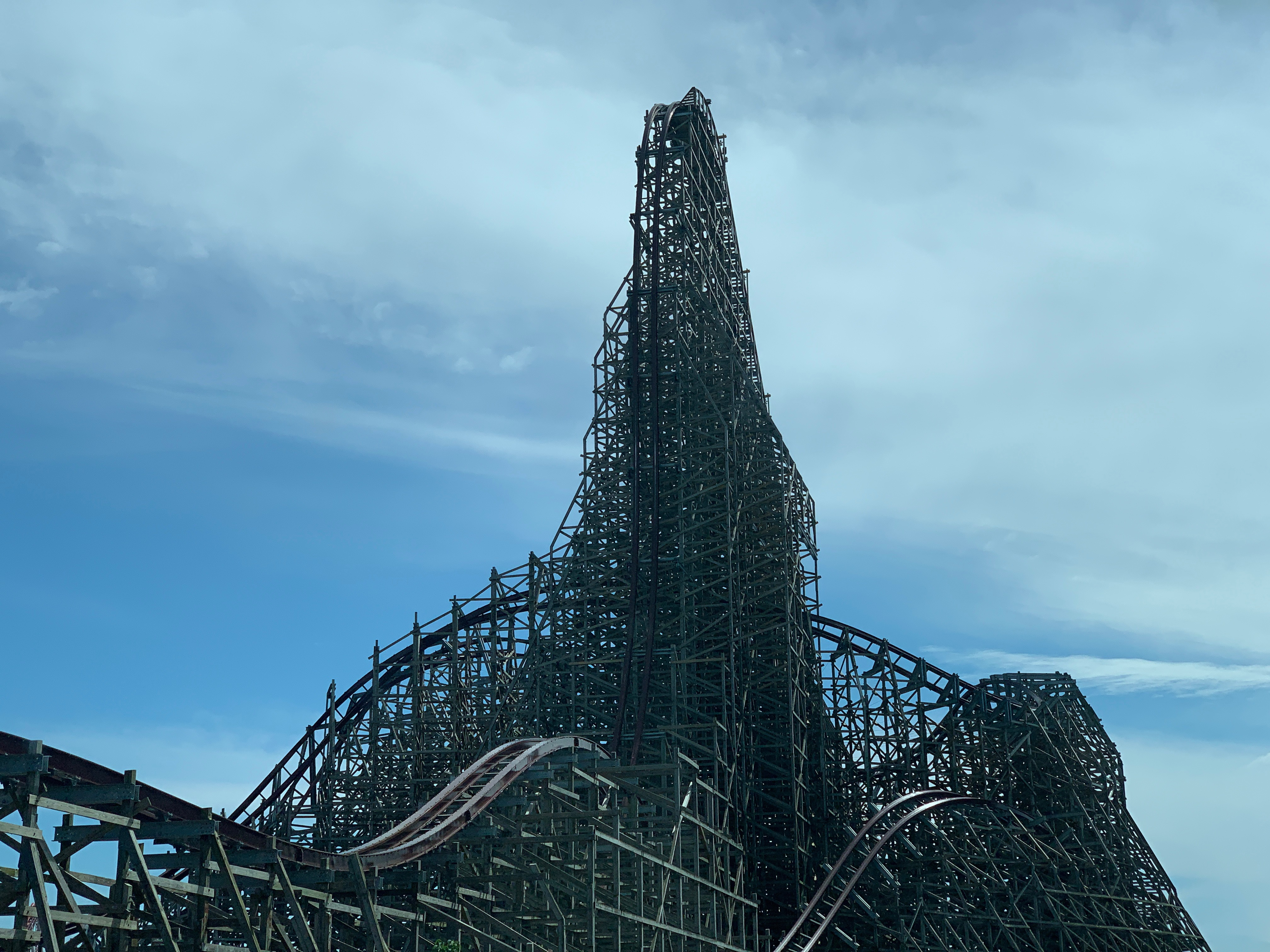
Steel Vengeance at Cedar Point

A hybrid roller coaster is a type of roller coaster that features a track made of one material, either wood or steel, supported by a structure made of the other. Early hybrid coasters include mine train roller coasters from Arrow Development, which feature steel track with a wooden support structure. Becoming increasingly more common are hybrids with wooden tracks and steel supports, such as The Voyage at Holiday World & Splashin' Safari.

Rocky Mountain Construction (RMC) is well-known for their I-Box track design, commonly used to retrofit existing wooden coasters with a new steel track. Such designs provide several benefits, offering smoother rides and reducing maintenance costs. Hybrid coasters can also add inversions, as seen in Mean Streak's conversion into Steel Vengeance at Cedar Point in 2018. Newer steel-tracked hybrids also tend to be taller, faster, and feature steeper drops than their wooden counterparts.

== History ==
Two main components of roller coaster design are their track and support structure. In most cases, both are made of the same material, either wood or steel. Occasionally, they are designed to feature a steel track with a wooden structure, or vice versa, which classifies a ride as a hybrid coaster. Hybrid coasters have existed for a long time, with one of the oldest being the Coney Island Cyclone at Luna Park, which opened in 1927. Its track is made from wood, while its support structure is made of steel. Arrow Development built a vast amount of mine train roller coasters beginning in the 1960s, featuring tubular steel track and wooden supports. One of their last such installations is Adventure Express at Kings Island, which opened in 1991.

The term "hybrid roller coaster" was introduced when New Texas Giant opened in 2011 and Six Flags classified the roller coaster as wood, despite having steel tracks. In response to the confusion over this ride classification, Six Flags reclassified the roller coaster as a "hybrid", which has since been used to refer to many other coasters that incorporate both steel and wood. Hybrid coasters are still typically classified as steel or wood based on what their track material is made from.

RMC and The Gravity Group are at the forefront of modern hybrid coaster construction. RMC is most well-known for refurbishing old wooden roller coasters by converting them into hybrids with steel track, beginning with New Texas Giant at Six Flags Over Texas in 2011. One of their most popular conversions is Steel Vengeance at Cedar Point, which has been consistently ranked as one of the best steel coasters in Amusement Today's Golden Ticket Awards. The Gravity Group designs coasters with wooden track and steel support structures, such as Mine Blower at Fun Spot America Kissimmee and Kentucky Flyer at Kentucky Kingdom.

Some roller coasters which were originally completely wooden may receive steel track from Great Coasters International (Titan Track) or RMC (208 ReTraK) in efforts to make their ride experiences smoother. Examples of this can be found on Tremors at Silverwood Theme Park and The Predator at Six Flags Darien Lake.

== Examples of hybrid roller coasters ==
Name	Park	Opened	Country	Notes
Cyclone	Luna Park	1927	United States	Wooden-tracked, steel supports. One of the oldest hybrid coasters in the world.
Runaway Mine Train	Six Flags Over Texas	1966	United States	Steel-tracked, wooden supports. First mine train coaster.
Gemini	Cedar Point	1978	United States	Steel-tracked racing coaster with wooden supports
The Predator	Six Flags Darien Lake	1990	United States	Originally completely wooden, now partially steel-tracked with wooden supports. Steel track was done by Great Coasters International.
Silver Comet	Niagara Amusement Park & Splash World	1999	United States	Wooden-tracked, steel supports. Inspired by Crystal Beach Park's The Comet.
Tremors	Silverwood Theme Park	1999	United States	Originally completely wooden, now fully steel tracked with wooden supports. Steel track was done by RMC.
The Voyage	Holiday World & Splashin' Safari	2006	United States	Wooden-tracked, steel supports. Most airtime on any wooden coaster in the world.
Ravine Flyer II	Waldameer & Water World	2008	United States	Wooden-tracked, steel supports. Only coaster to cross overtop a four-lane highway.
New Texas Giant	Six Flags Over Texas	2011	United States	Steel-tracked, wooden supports. First RMC conversion. Originally opened in 1990 as Texas Giant.
Hades 360	Mt. Olympus Water & Theme Park	2013	United States	Wooden-tracked, steel supports. Originally opened as Hades in 2005. Was modified in 2013 to feature an inversion, a rarity on wooden coasters.
Steel Vengeance	Cedar Point	2018	United States	Steel-tracked, wooden supports. First hybrid hypercoaster. Most airtime on any coaster in the world. Originally opened in 1991 as Mean Streak.
Untamed	Walibi Holland	2019	Netherlands	Steel-tracked, wooden supports. First RMC conversion in Europe. Originally opened in 2000 as Robin Hood.
Zadra	Energylandia	2019	Poland	Steel-tracked, wooden supports. First hybrid hypercoaster in Europe. Tied with Iron Gwazi for the title of tallest hybrid coaster in the world.
Hakugei (白鯨)	Nagashima Spa Land	2019	Japan	Steel-tracked, wooden supports. First RMC conversion in Asia. Originally opened in 1994 as White Cyclone (ホワイトサイクロン).
Iron Gwazi	Busch Gardens Tampa Bay	2022	United States	Steel-tracked, wooden supports. Fastest and steepest hybrid coaster in the world. Tied with Zadra for the title of tallest hybrid coaster in the world. Originally opened in 1999 as Gwazi.
Wildcat's Revenge	Hersheypark	2023	United States	Steel-tracked. World's largest underflip inversion. Originally opened in 1996 as Wildcat.
