= Silver Comet =

Silver Comet may refer to:

- Silver Comet (roller coaster), a roller coaster at Niagara Amusement Park & Splash World in Grand Island, New York
- Silver Comet (train), a passenger train in use from the 1940s to the 1960s
- Silver Comet Trail, a multi-use recreational trail in western Georgia
