= Splashwater Kingdom =

Splashwater Kingdom can refer to:

- Six Flags The Great Escape & Splashwater Kingdom
- Splashwater Kingdom at Six Flags Kentucky Kingdom
