= Niagara Amusement Park & Splash World =

Amusement Park in Grand Island, New York

Niagara Amusement Park and Splash World
- Previously known as Fantasy Island (1961–1992, 2016–2019); Two Flags Over Niagara Fun Park (1992–1994); Martin's Fantasy Island (1994–2016)
- Interactive map of Niagara Amusement Park and Splash World
- Location: 2400 Grand Island Boulevard, Grand Island, New York, U.S.
- Coordinates: 43°1′37.2″N 78°58′14.5″W
- Status: Defunct
- Opened: July 1, 1961
- Closed: September 22, 2025
- Owner: Store Capital
- Operated by: IB Parks & Entertainment
- Area: 85 acres (0.34 km^{2})
- Website: Official website

Niagara Amusement Park & Splash World (formerly Fantasy Island, Two Flags Over Niagara Fun Park, and Martin's Fantasy Island) was an 85 acre (34 ha) amusement park in Grand Island, New York near Niagara Falls. It featured an amusement park and a water park. The park was founded by Lawrence Grant. At time of closing it was owned by Store Capital and operated by IB Parks & Entertainment. It operated somewhat infrequently from 1961 to 2025.

== History ==
=== Fantasy Island, Inc. (1961–1981) ===
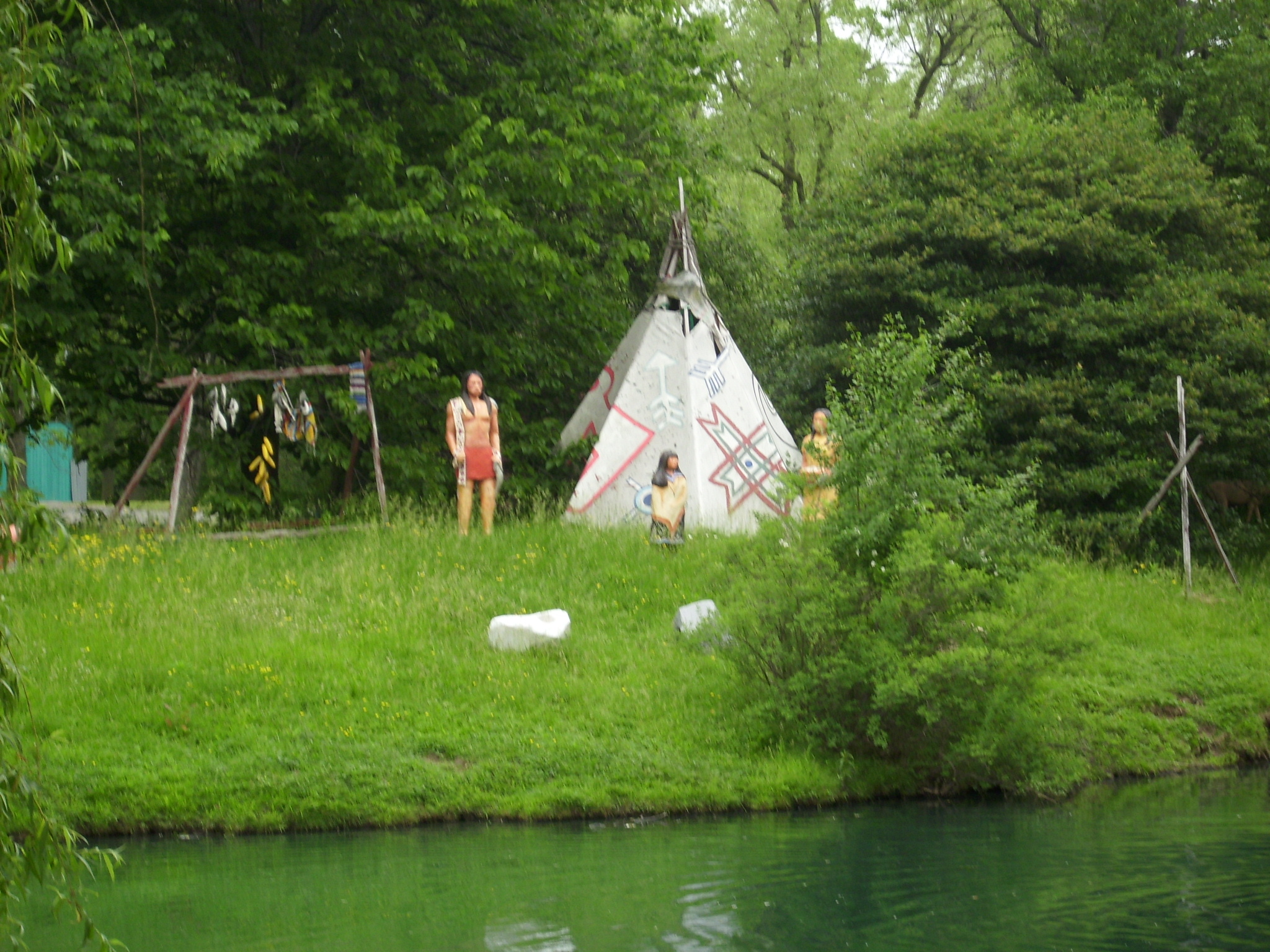
Indian Village in 2011

Fantasy Island was founded by real estate developer Lawrence Grant, and opened on July 1, 1961. It was planned by co-financier and local jeweler Gerald Birzon, with buildings designed by Milton Milstein & Associates. The ownership group was formed under the name Fantasy Land, Inc. before changing soon after to Fantasy Island, Inc. The group had originally planned to call the park Fantasy Land, but changed the name for legal reasons after discovering there was an area of Disneyland called Fantasyland.

Upon opening, the park occupied only 12 acres (0.049 km^{2}) of land that was divided into five themed areas: Action Town, Animal Kingdom, Garden of Fables, Indian Village and Western Town. Action Town featured amusement rides, Animal Kingdom featured a petting zoo, Garden of Fables featured explorable recreations of fairy tale scenes, Indian Village featured Native American dancers, and Western Town featured a live Wild West show.

To promote the park, WGRz aired a live weekly television program on Saturday mornings from 1961 to 1962 titled Fantasy Island Show, featuring the park's characters and puppeteers performing for an all-children live studio audience. The show's host and protagonist was Buckskin Joe, portrayed by park general manager Clyde "Buddy" Farnan.

A 2,500-seat outdoor arena was constructed in 1965 for French lion tamer Jean "Tarzan" Zerbini's circus. Actor Jim Carrey grew up in nearby Ontario and would vacation at Fantasy Island, citing Zerbini's show as a fond memory.

The park was expanded to 85 acres (0.34 km^{2}) in 1974 to make room for more thrilling rides and to broaden the park's appeal.

Citing the 1979 oil crisis and rising cost of gasoline, the park reported a 62% drop in profits during the 1979 season. The park was put up for sale that same year.

After dwindling attendance stemming from Western New York's Rust Belt economic decline, Fantasy Island, Inc. declared bankruptcy in 1982, and the park did not operate for the 1982 season.

=== Charles R. Wood Enterprises (1982–1989) ===
The park was acquired out of bankruptcy in November 1982 by Charles R. Wood Enterprises, headed by Charles Wood, founder of Great Escape in Queensbury, New York.

A water park called Water World was added in 1984. Wood also installed an 800-seat picnic pavilion that was previously used at the 1982 World's Fair.

Arto Monaco was commissioned to redesign Garden of Fables, constructing a castle with a moat that was encircled by a horse-drawn carriage he had previously built for Land of Makebelieve.

=== International Broadcasting Corporation (1989–1992) ===
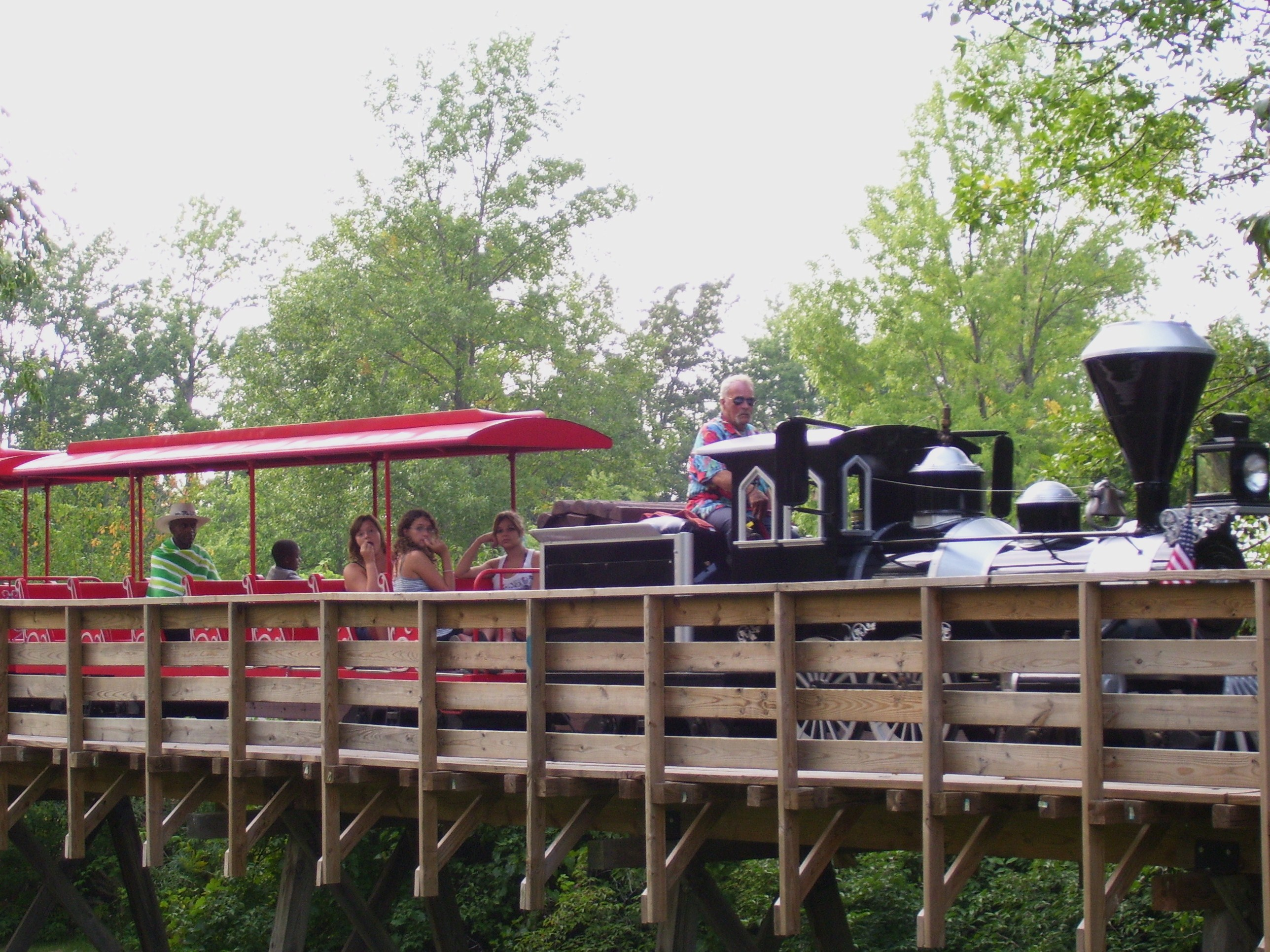
Allan Herschell Company-built Iron Horse Train in 2008

Wood sold the park to International Broadcasting Corporation (IBC) in April 1989 for $36 million. As part of the deal, Wood would remain the chief executive officer of the park, and his son-in-law, Tom Wages, was retained as general manager.

Following the 1989 closure of nearby Crystal Beach Park, that park's famed The Comet roller coaster was purchased by Charles Wood at auction in October 1989 for $210,000, disassembled, and stored indefinitely at Fantasy Island.

In June 1990, Michael Murach was paralyzed from the head down while performing a high diving act at the park when he slipped on a diving board during a comedy act and fell 20 feet (6 m), hitting his head on the edge of the concrete pool. Years later, Murach was awarded damages of $58.6 million after a jury found International Broadcasting Corporation 100% liable for his injury. The end of the diving board was not installed at a proper distance away from the edge of the pool to prevent such an incident from occurring.

In August 1991, 14-year-old Kenneth Margerum fell 60 feet (18 m) to his death from the park's Ferris wheel after his seat dropped from its axle. It was revealed that the park operators routinely removed one or two seats from the ride each day to prevent the ride from moving around in high winds during off-hours. Each time the ride opened, the seats were bolted back onto the frame of the ride. Investigators found that only one side of the victim's seat had been bolted properly, causing Margerum's seat to drop from its axle, subsequently leading to his death.

=== Charles R. Wood Enterprises (1992–1994) ===
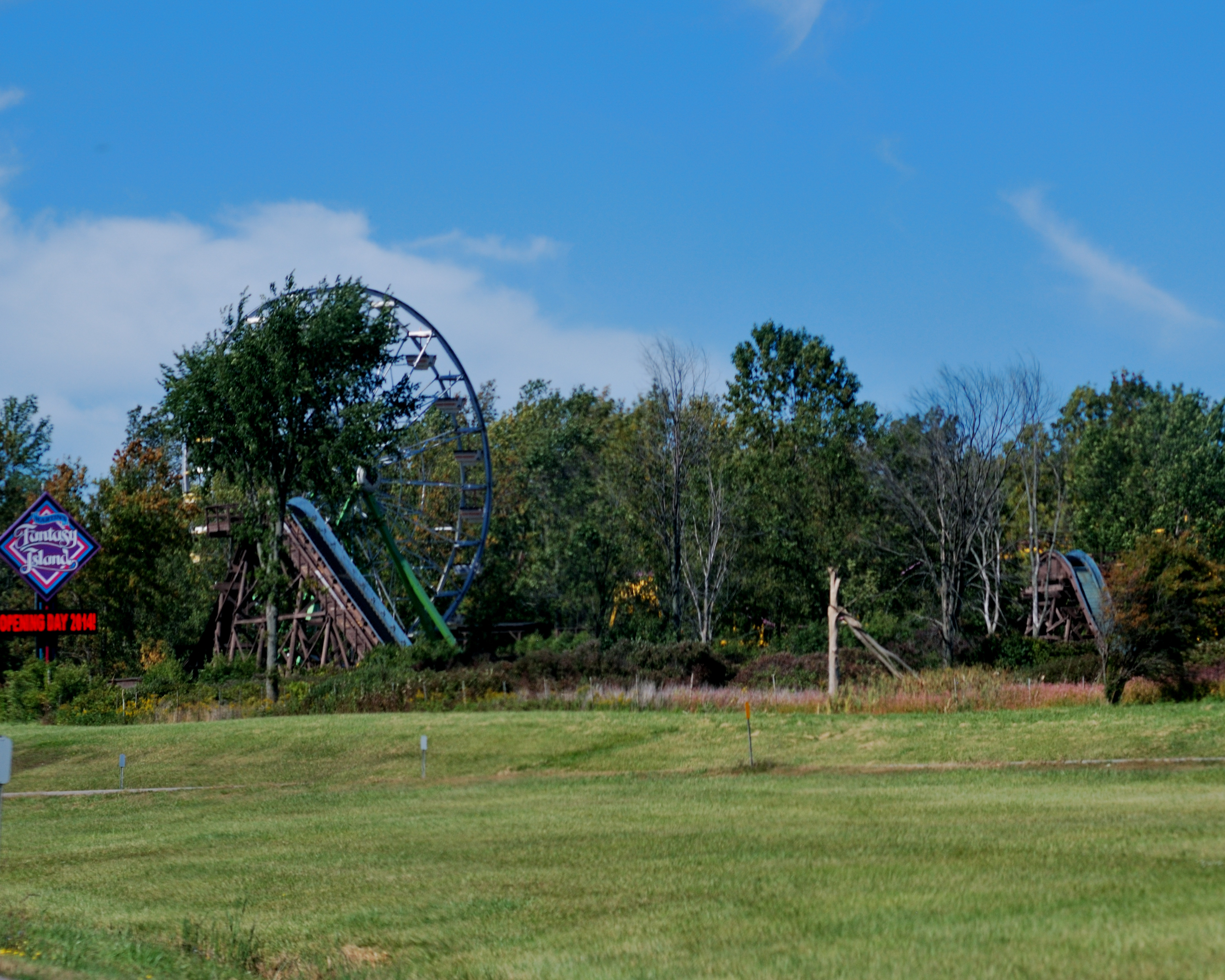
The park in 2014

Charles Wood reacquired the park in October 1992 for $14 million when International Broadcasting Corporation went bankrupt. In his second stint of ownership, Wood changed the park's name to Two Flags Over Niagara Fun Park.

=== Martin's Shows (1994–2016) ===
Martin DiPietro, owner of Martin's Shows, purchased the park and renamed it Martin's Fantasy Island in January 1994. Charles Wood took the stored The Comet roller coaster and reassembled it at Great Escape later that year. DiPietro would install his own roller coaster named Silver Comet in 1999, inspired by the original.

=== Store Capital (2016–2021) ===
==== Apex Parks Group ====
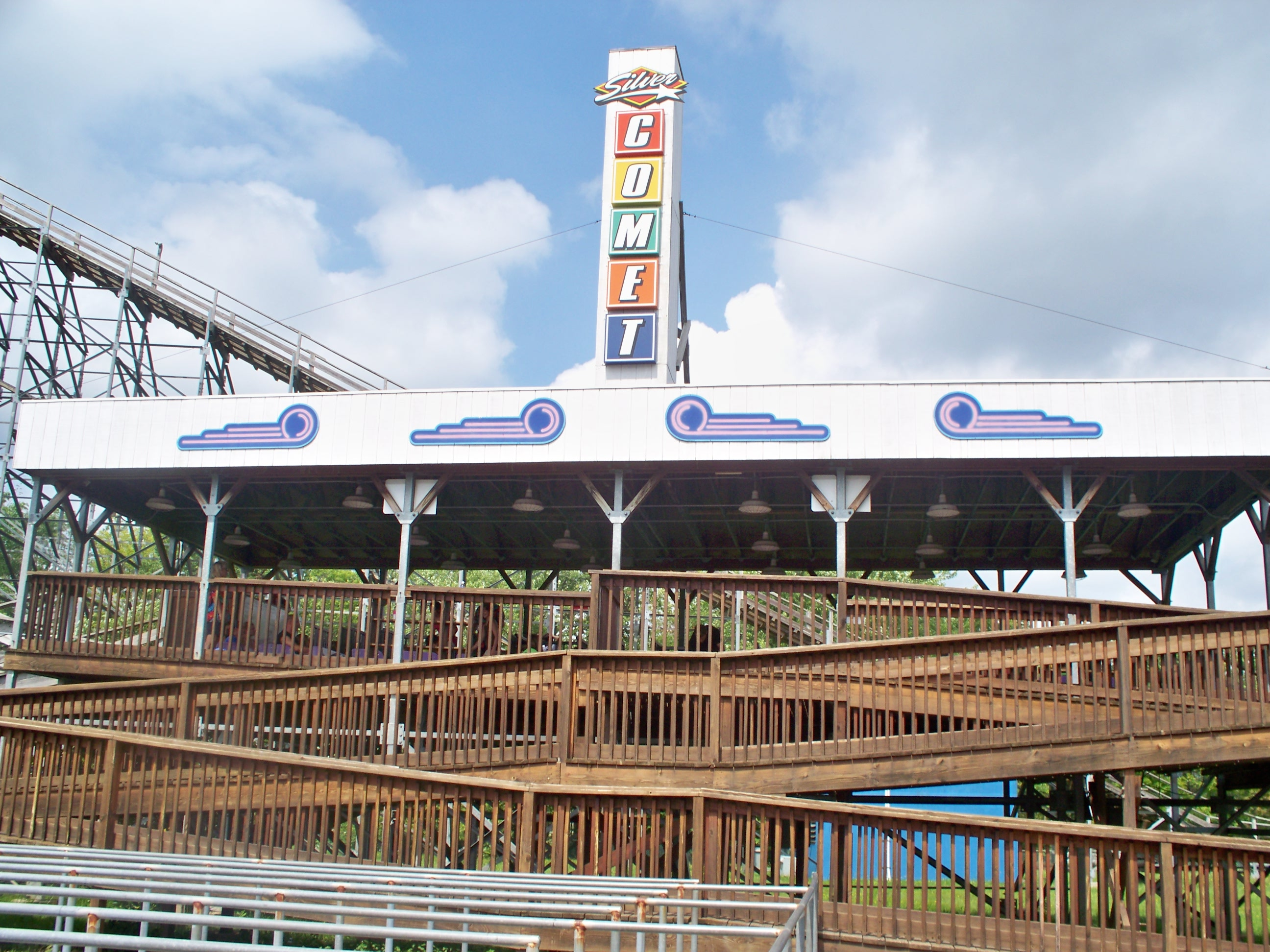
Silver Comet station in 2009

Martin DiPietro sold the park's land to Store Capital in May 2016, and Apex Parks Group began leasing the property from Store Capital that same month. The park returned to its original name of Fantasy Island.

Reports surfaced in 2018 and 2019 that the general condition of the park had deteriorated, with many attractions not operational due to mechanical failure and understaffing.

On February 19, 2020, following reports that Apex Parks Group had put the park's rides up for sale, the company confirmed that the park had permanently closed. A settlement was reached with the Attorney General's office to refund customers that had purchased 2020 season passes.

==== IB Parks & Entertainment (2021–present) ====
Gene Staples, owner of IB Parks & Entertainment, entered a long-term agreement to lease the property from Store Capital in May 2021. IB Parks & Entertainment also owns and operates Clementon Park and Splash World and Indiana Beach. The park was renamed Niagara Amusement Park & Splash World, and reopened in August 2021. The 2021 season featured only the water park, as rides were refurbished and reinstalled in the dry park. The full park reopened for the 2022 season.

In mid-April 2026, management of the park indicated that they were "working through some logistics" in regard to that season's opening after failing to post job openings or offer season passes by April. It was announced on April 30, 2026, that the park would not open for the 2026 season, citing low attendance and revenue levels.

== Rides and attractions at time of closure ==
=== Roller coasters ===
Name	Picture	Opened	Manufacturer	Notes
Silver Comet		May 1, 1999	Custom Coasters International	A hybrid wooden roller coaster inspired by The Comet
The Serpent		August 27, 2024	S.D.C.	A Galaxi coaster that previously operated at Noble Park Funland (1987–1988), LeSourdsville Lake Amusement Park (1989–2002), and Kokomo's Family Fun Center (2009–2019). The Serpent arrived at the park in pieces in 2022. It did not open to the public until 2024.

=== Rides ===
Name	Opened	Manufacturer	Type	Notes
Amazing Flying Machine	2022	Majestic Manufacturing	Flying Scooters	Previously traveled with Wade Shows. Replaced Mind Warp before being relocated to the former Flight site for the 2024 season.
Antique Autos	1961	Arrow Huss, Gould Manufacturing	Antique cars	Formerly known as Antique Cars and Crankshaft Cruisers
Auto Carousel	1963	Hennecke	Carousel	A children's carousel with automobile-themed rider vehicles
Balloons	Unknown	Zamperla	Balloon Race	
Circus	2008	Sartori Rides	Spinning children's ride	
Dodgem Bumper Cars	1989	Majestic Manufacturing	Bumper cars	
Drop Zone	2015	SBF Visa Group	Drop tower (Drop'n Twist)	A 20-foot (6 m) children's drop tower that replaced Jack and the Beanstalk. Formerly known as Rapunzel! Rapunzel!.
The Flying Witch	2025	Pinfari	Dark ride	A multi-story tracked dark ride through haunted house scenes with old-school props and scene displays. It previously operated at Playland from 1971 to 2021.
Grand Ole Carousel	1961	Theel	Carousel	Formerly known as Grande Carousel
Giant Wheel	1994	Chance Rides	Ferris wheel	Replaced the Astro Wheel and was formerly known as Gondola Wheel
Gunslinger	2022	Eli Bridge Company	Scrambler	Formerly known as Baltidora at La Feria de Chapultepec
Hot Rod Crusin	1961	Allan Herschell Company	Miniature car ride	Spinning children's ride featuring hot rod-inspired ride vehicles
Iron Horse Train	1961	Allan Herschell Company	Miniature railway	Utilizes a train which previously operated at Beaver Island State Park for a spare engine and cars
Niagara Helicopter Tours	1961	Allan Herschell Company	Red Baron	Spinning children's ride featuring helicopter-shaped ride vehicles
Pony Carts	2024	Allan Herschell Company	Spinning children's ride	
Planes and Copters	2022	Unknown	Spinning children's ride	
Scooter	2023	Majestic Manufacturing	Bumper cars	Previously traveled with Bates Brothers Amusement Company
Ships Ahoy	1961	Allan Herschell Company	Spinning children's boat ride	
Steel Colt	1983	Zamperla	Miniature train ride	
Sea Dragon	2024	Chance Rides	Pirate ship	Previously operated at Santa's Village Amusement & Water Park from 2011 to 2022
Tilt-A-Whirl	2024	Sellner Manufacturing	Tilt-A-Whirl	Replacing the park's previous Tilt-A-Whirl that operated from 1992 to 2019. This Tilt-A-Whirl was acquired from Joyland Amusement Park.
Whirly Swings	2025	Zamperla	Miniature swing ride	

=== Splash World attractions ===
Name	Opened	Closed	Manufacturer	Type	Notes
Cannon Bowl	2006	Operating	ProSlide Technology	Bowl water slide (CannonBOWL)	
Dinosaur Pool	1980s	Operating	Unknown	Children's pool	
Double Dare Falls	1984	Operating	Technetic Industries	Water slide	Formerly known as Raging Rapids
Dragster Drench	2012	Operating	ProSlide Technology	Racing water slide (RACER)	
Lazy River	1990	Operating	Unknown	Lazy river	Formerly known as Splash Creek
Surf Hill	1987	Operating	ProSlide Technology	Children's water slide	

=== Attractions out of operation ===
Niagara Amusement Park & Splash World owned a large collection of attractions that were in varying states of construction or storage. Listed below are rides which were out of operation at the time of the park's closure. Most of these attractions were relocated from other parks, but never opened to the public at Niagara Amusement Park & Splash World following the park's 2021 reopening. The Comet and a drop tower named Strike-U-Up were briefly in storage at the park as well, but have since been removed and were never constructed. Additionally, a kiddie coaster named Miner Mike was briefly set up on the property, but it never opened to the public, and it was eventually removed.

Name	Opened	Status at time of park closure	Manufacturer	Notes
Black Buccaneer	Will not open	In storage	HUSS Park Attractions	A pirate ship that was brought to the park in 2021, having previously operated at Chessington World of Adventures from 1988 to 2018. The ride has since been deemed to be in critical condition and likely will never be assembled.
Cascabel	TBD	In storage	Anton Schwarzkopf	A Shuttle Loop coaster that first operated as Laser Loop at Kennywood from 1980 to 1990. It was then sold to La Feria de Chapultepec, where it operated as Cascabel from 1994 to 2019. Cascabel was dismantled and sold online at a starting price of $490,000. In April 2021, prior to the purchase of Fantasy Island by IB Parks & Entertainment, the Cascabel train and track pieces were spotted in storage at Indiana Beach. Other track pieces appeared in the parking lot of Niagara Amusement Park & Splash World in February 2022, and the ride was stated to be a planned installation at the park at some point in the future.
Caterpillar	TBD	Under construction	Mack Rides	A Caterpillar that previously operated at Myrtle Beach Pavilion until 2006, and at Broadway at the Beach at some point before it was brought to the park
Dillen	TBD	In storage	HUSS Park Attractions	An airboat that previously operated at BonBon-Land from 1999 to 2013
Flying Falcon	TBD	In storage	HUSS Park Attractions	A Condor that previously operated at Hersheypark from 1990 to 2016
Kraken	TBD	Under construction	Unknown	An Octopus ride that was installed on the former Devil's Hole site
Mardi Gras Hangover	TBD	In storage	Larson International	A Fire Ball ride that previously operated at Six Flags Great America from 2018 to 2023. The attraction was brought to the park in February 2024.
Magic Ring	1961	In Storage	Zamperla	A spinning children's ride. Was original to Niagara Amusement Park & Splash World.
Midway Mayhem	TBD	Under construction	HUSS Park Attractions	A Frisbee ride that operated at Six Flags Great Adventure as Pendulum from 1999 to 2003 and at Six Flags Great America from 2004 to 2023 as Revolution. The attraction was brought to the park in February 2024, and in May of that year it was set up on the site that previously held Amazing Flying Machine, Mind Warp, and Sizzler.
Wave Pool	1995	Closed	Unknown	A derelict wave pool that replaced Kid Wash. It last operated in 2019 and did not reopen since. Was original to Niagara Amusement Park & Splash World.
Hully Gully	TBD	In storage	Chance Rides	A Trabant ride that previously operated with German showman Röper from 1968 to 1981, German showman Franke from 1982 to 1984, and at Heide Park Resort from 1985 to 2009. It remained at Heide Park Resort out of operation until 2017, when it was sold. It was brought to the park in 2022.
Montezuma's Revenge	TBD	In storage	HUSS Park Attractions	A Top Spin ride that previously operated at Avonturenpark Hellendoorn in the Netherlands from 1998 to 2020. It was brought to the park in 2022.

== Former rides and attractions ==
Many of the park's rides were sold by Apex Parks Group following the closure of the park in 2019.

=== Former roller coasters ===
Name	Year opened	Year closed	Manufacturer	Description	Notes
Crazy Mouse	2005	2019	Zamperla	Steel wild mouse coaster	Replaced Wildcat
Dragon	1986	1988	Wisdom Rides	Steel powered children's coaster	
Little Dipper	1961	1995	Allan Herschell Company	Steel children's coaster	
Max's Doggy Dog Coaster	2013	2019	SBF Visa Group	Steel children's coaster	
Orient Express	1998	2003	Wisdom Rides	Steel children's coaster	
Orient Express	2019	2019	Wisdom Rides	Steel children's coaster	A different coaster from the previously listed Orient Express. Also known as "Dragon's Flight".
Wildcat	1972	2005	Schwarzkopf	Steel coaster	

=== Former rides ===
Name	Years operated	Year closed	Manufacturer	Type	Notes
Astro Wheel	1981	1994	Chance Rides	Ferris wheel	Acquired from Great Escape. Sold to Amusements of Buffalo, and later Kissel Entertainment.
Balloon Race	1985	1994	Zamperla	Balloon Race	Replaced by Jack and the Beanstalk. Sold to Great Escape.
Bugs	1972	2011	Venture Manufacturing	Unknown	Sold to Martin's Shows
Bumper Boats	1970	1995	Unknown	Bumper boats	
Chaos	1997	2007	Chance Rides	Chaos	
Cinderella's Midnight Magic Wheel	2018	2019	Sartori Rides	Miniature Ferris wheel	Acquired from Indiana Beach
Cinema 180	1961	2003	Unknown	3D cinema	Optical illusion film show
Crazy Bus	1997	2013	Zamperla	Crazy Bus	
DareDevil	2001	2008	Chance Rides	Unknown	
Devil's Hole	1975	1994	Chance Rides	Rotor	
Devil's Hole	2011	2019	Wisdom Rides	Gravitron	Replaced Starship 2000
Enchanted Tea Party	2014	2019	Zamperla	Teacups	Replaced Tea Cups
Flight	2008	2019	Zamperla	Sky Flyer	Replaced DareDevil
Flying Bobs	1989	2003	Chance Rides	Himalaya	Acquired from Crystal Beach Park. Sold to an unknown location in Mexico.
Giant Slide	1975	2018	Whitehead Plastics	Fun slide	
Goosey Goosey Gander	2011	2019	Allan Herschell Company	Miniature carousel	Formerly Blue Goose
Jack and the Beanstalk	2004	2015	Moser's Rides	Drop tower	Replaced Orient Express. Relocated to Bay Beach Amusement Park.
Jack and the Beanstalk	2015	Unknown	SBF Visa Group	Drop tower	
Mega Disk'o	2009	2019	Zamperla	Disk'O	Replaced Patriot
Mind Warp	2011	2019	Technical Park	Loop Fighter	Replaced Sizzler
Nitro	2003	2009	Zamperla	Frisbee	
Old Mill Scream	1986	2014	Arrow Dynamics	Log flume	
Over The Falls	2014	2014	KMG	Speed	Replaced Old Mill Scream. Sold to a showman in England after a single season.
Paratrooper	1975	1994	Frank Hrubetz & Company	Paratrooper	Sold to Amusements of Buffalo, and later to a traveling carnival in Michigan
Patriot	1989	2009	A.R.M. (United Kingdom)	Ranger	
Rampage	1979	1984	Watkins	Unknown	Trailer-mounted
Rock & Roll	2015	2019	Bertazzon	Music Express	
Rockin' Tug	2013	2019	Zamperla	Rockin' Tug	Located on the plot of land where Super Truck previously operated
Rok O Plane	1975	1998	Eyerly Aircraft Company	Rock-O-Plane	Acquired from Martin's Shows
Sea Ray	1995	2011	Mulligan Engineering		
Sizzler	1989	2011	Wisdom Rides	Scrambler	
Space Shuttle	1961	1994	Chance Rides	Swinging ship	Sold to Amusements of Buffalo
Space Whirl	1963	1976	Arrow Development	Teacups	Acquired from Century 21 Exposition
Starship 2000	2009	2011	Wisdom Rides	Gravitron	
Super Spiral	1977	2002	Frank Hrubetz & Company	Round Up	
Super Truck	1994	2007	SBF Visa Group	Miniature truck ride	Truck ride. Operated on the site later occupied by Rockin' Tug.
Tea Cups	1997	2014	Zamperla	Miniature teacups	
Tilt & Shout	2007	2019	A.R.M. Rides (United States)	Ali Baba	Formerly known as Full Tilt
Tilt-A-Whirl	1992	2019	Sellner Manufacturing	Tilt-A-Whirl	
Trabant	1961	1994	Chance Rides	Trabant	Sold to Great Escape
YoYo	1961	1994	Chance Rides	Swing ride	Sold to Amusements of Buffalo, and later to Quassy Amusement Park

=== Former Splash World attractions ===
Name	Year opened	Year closed	Manufacturer	Type
Kid Wash	1980s	1995	Unknown	Splash pad
