= Wellscroft =

Historic house in New York, United States

- U.S. National Register of Historic Places
- Location within New York Location within the United States
- Location: 158 NY 9N, Upper Jay, New York
- Coordinates: 44°20′37″N 73°46′21″W
- Area: 15 acres (6.1 ha)
- Built: 1903
- Architect: Bliss, E.L.; et al.
- Architectural style: Tudor Revival
- NRHP reference No.: 03001513
- Added to NRHP: January 28, 2004

Wellscroft is a historic estate complex located at Upper Jay in Essex County, New York. It was built in 1903 and is a large and distinguished Tudor Revival–style summer estate home. It is a long, 2 1/2-story, rectangular-shaped building with several projecting bays, porches, gables and dormers, a porte cochere and a service wing. The rear facade features a large semi-circular projection. The first-story exterior is faced in native fieldstone. The interior features a number of Arts and Crafts style design features. Also on the property are a power house, fire house, gazebo, root cellar, reservoir, ruins of the caretaker's house and carriage house, and the remains of the landscaped grounds.

It was listed on the National Register of Historic Places in 2004.
