= Keith and Branch Ford Motors Factory and Showroom =

Historic building in New York, United States

- U.S. National Register of Historic Places
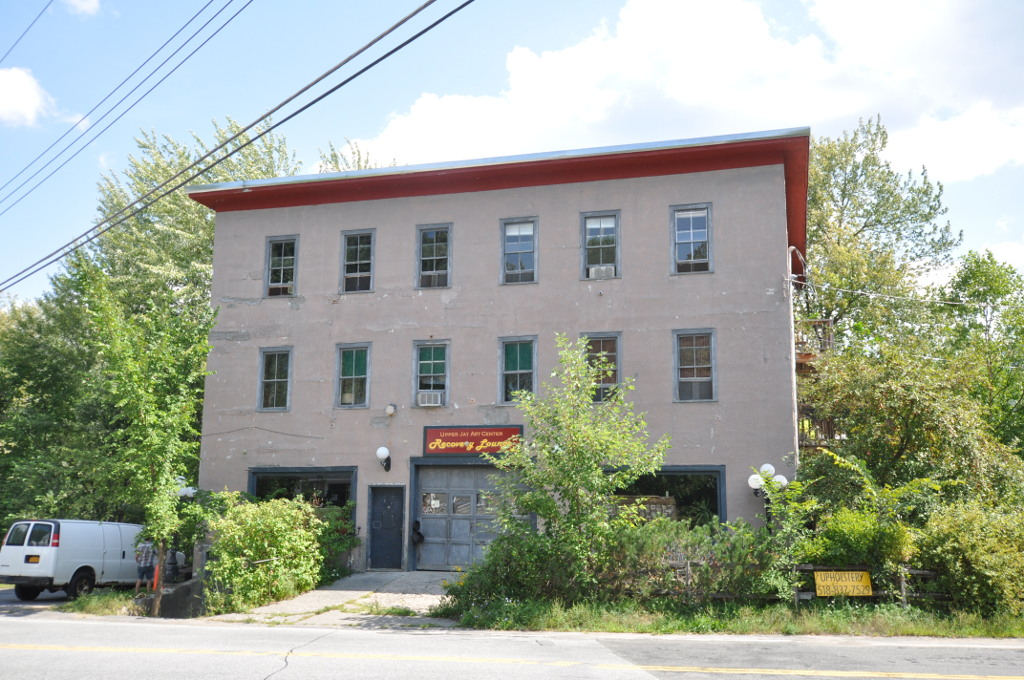

- Location within New York Location within the United States
- Location: 12198 NY 9N, Upper Jay, New York
- Coordinates: 44°20′11″N 73°46′43″W
- Area: 0.77 acres (0.31 ha)
- Built: c. 1920
- NRHP reference No.: 13000329
- Added to NRHP: May 28, 2013

Keith and Branch Ford Motors Factory and Showroom, also known as The Old Seed Store, is a historic factory and car dealership building located at Upper Jay, Essex County, New York. It was built about 1920, and is a three-story, six bay by four bay, stuccoed frame building. It has a nearly flat roof and sits on a poured concrete foundation. It was built to accommodate the partial assembly and local sale of Ford Motor Company's Model T automobiles.

It was added to the National Register of Historic Places in 2013.
