= Steamin' Demon =

Roller coaster at Great Escape in New York

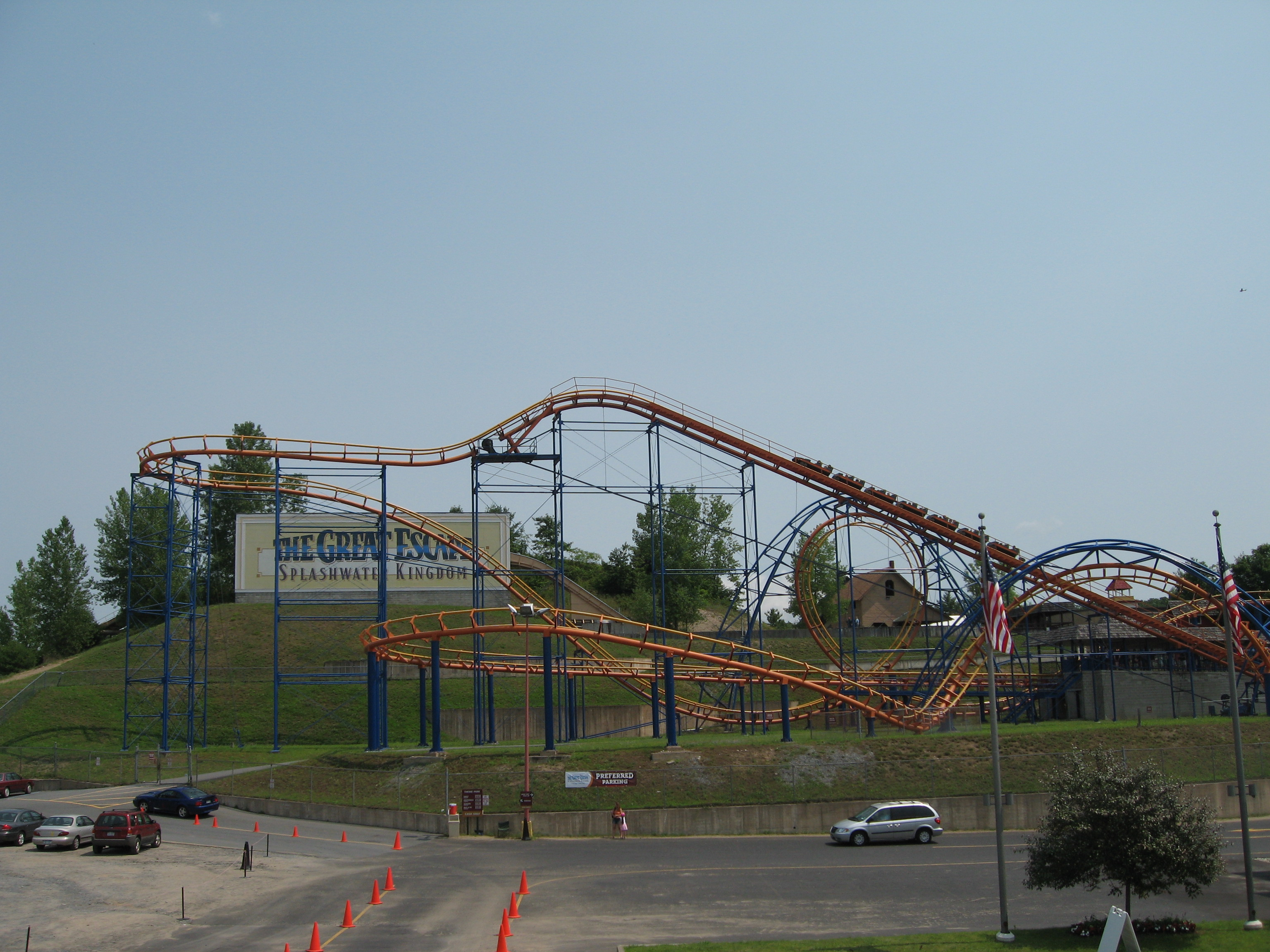

Great Escape
- Location: Great Escape
- Park section: Ghost Town
- Coordinates: 43°21′4.84″N 73°41′33.71″W
- Status: Operating
- Opening date: May 26, 1984

General statistics
- Type: Steel
- Manufacturer: Arrow Development
- Lift/launch system: Chain lift hill
- Height: 95 ft (29 m)
- Length: 1,565 ft (477 m)
- Speed: 45 mph (72 km/h)
- Inversions: 3
- Duration: 37 seconds
- Height restriction: 48 in (122 cm)
- Trains: Single train with 7 cars; riders arranged 2 across in 2 rows for a total of 28 riders per train
- Fast Lane available
- Steamin' Demon at RCDB

Steamin' Demon is a steel roller coaster located at Great Escape in Queensbury, New York, United States. It opened in 1984 and was built by Arrow Development.

== History ==
The ride originally operated at Pontchartrain Beach as Ragin' Cajun from 1978 to 1983, when the park closed.

Steamin' Demon was the first major ride, and the first roller coaster, installed after Storytown USA changed its name to The Great Escape.

Six Flags announced on March 3, 2016 that Steamin' Demon would be among several rides at various Six Flags parks that would receive a virtual reality (VR) upgrade. Riders would have the option to wear Samsung Gear VR headsets, powered by Oculus, to create a 360-degree 3D experience while riding. The illusion was themed to a fighter jet, where riders flew through a futuristic city as co-pilots battling alien invaders. The feature debuted on the coaster in the summer of 2016. It has since been removed.

== Ride experience ==
The ride is located at the front of the park in the Ghosttown section. The coaster features a single vertical loop and a double corkscrew.

Steamin' Demon is an early Arrow Development Corkscrew coaster, featuring a layout that was common in the era it was designed.
