= Pontchartrain Beach =

Former amusement park in New Orleans, Louisiana, United States

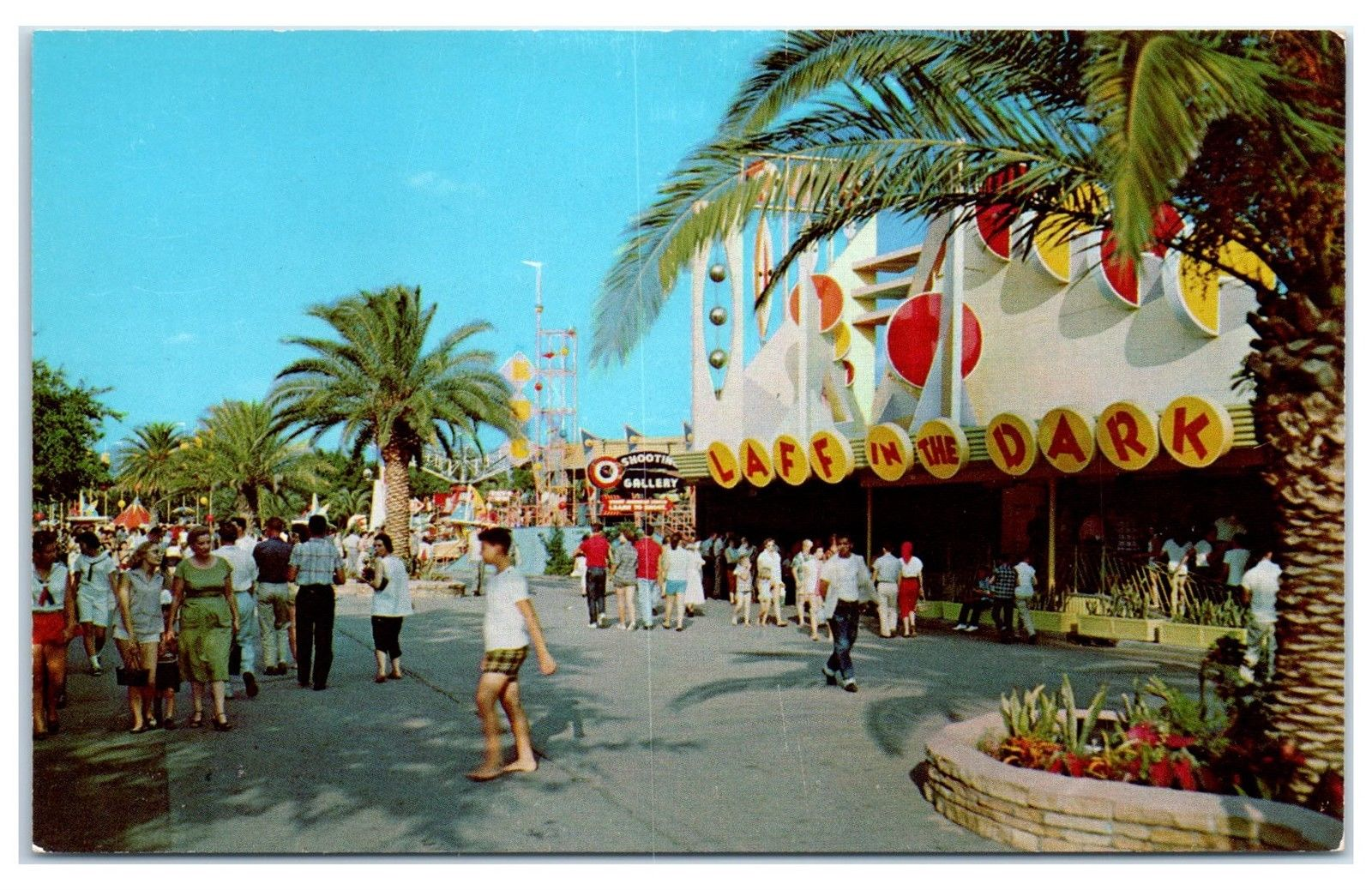
- Pontchartrain Beach c. early 1960s
- Interactive map of Pontchartrain Beach
- Location: New Orleans, Louisiana, U.S.
- Coordinates: 30.032°N 90.062°W
- Status: Defunct
- Opened: June 30, 1928
- Closed: September 5, 1983 (last day of public admittance); Reopened for one day on September 24, 1983, for a charity event

Pontchartrain Beach was an amusement park located in New Orleans, Louisiana, on the south shore of Lake Pontchartrain. It was founded by Harry J. Batt Sr. (grandfather of American actor Bryan Batt) and later managed and owned by his sons, Harry J. Batt Jr. and John A. Batt. It opened on Saturday, June 30, 1928, across Bayou St. John from an existing amusement resort at Old Spanish Fort. Pontchartrain Beach's original location is the present-day lakefront neighborhood of Lake Terrace.

In the early 1930s, subsequent to the construction of a seawall extending from West End to the Industrial Canal which created a new shoreline for Lake Pontchartrain, Pontchartrain Beach was moved to a new location at the lake end of Elysian Fields Avenue, a location formerly offshore of Milneburg.

Pontchartrain Beach included a beach with a large Art Deco style bathhouse and swimming pools, amusement rides (including a wooden roller coaster called the Zephyr), and concession stands. The park featured live music concerts, including many local musicians and touring national acts such as Elvis Presley.

Other rides and amusements included the Zephyr Junior, Smoky Mary, the Wild Maus, Musik Express, Log Ride, the Ragin' Cajun (a modern, looping steel coaster), the Bug, Paratrooper, Scrambler, Calypso, the "airplanes", Haunted House, Ghost Train, bumper cars, carousel, Ferris wheel, the Monster, Trabant, Sky Ride, Hard Rock, Galaxy, Laff in the Dark, Magic Rainbow, Red Baron, and Kiddieland. As with other amusement or theme parks, over time certain older rides were changed out for new ones.

In addition to rides, there were also the summertime shows which changed every few years (Skipper & Dolly dolphin show, Great American High Dive Show, Merlin's Magic Rainbow Show). For a few years there was also a fairly large petting zoo with many farm animals and a huge red barn house. A miniature golf course was added, when this pastime became popular. Just outside the entrance gates was the Bali Hai Tiki-style restaurant. Another popular restaurant was the Ship Ahoy, which featured hamburgers and seafood.

Pontchartrain Beach was sold on September 23, 1983. The main reason it closed down was due to declining attendance.

In 1943, Corporal Douglas O'Brien, a World War II serviceman from Springfield, Massachusetts, fell 75 feet (23 m) to his death from the top of the Zephyr roller coaster. He was 32 years old.

== Pontchartrain Beach today ==
Several of the rides – including the Airplanes and many Kiddieland rides – ended up in Gulf Shores, Alabama, at a small amusement park, which was subsequently wiped out by Hurricane Ivan in 2004. The Ragin' Cajun moved to Great Escape in Queensbury, New York and opened in 1984 as Steamin' Demon. One of the four antique carousels is located on the boardwalk in Myrtle Beach, South Carolina. Also, the crest of the Zephyr currently resides at Kenner Memorial Park, among with remnants of Bali Hai restaurant.

On May 20th, 2000, the Mega Zeph wooden roller coaster opened at the now defunct theme park, Six Flags New Orleans, named as a nod to the original Zephyr. The park and coaster were abandoned following catastrophic damage from Hurricane Katrina, and the coaster was demolished in 2025.

The hand-painted carousel horses were donated by Harry J. Batt Jr. and John A. Batt to New Orleans' City Park. The Park did not acknowledge the gifts or recognize the Batts for their donation.

The land formerly housing the park is now occupied by the University of New Orleans Research & Technology Park, home to numerous corporate tenants, the Navy's Space and Naval Warfare Systems Center (SPAWAR) and the UNO Advanced Technology Center office building.

A mile-long sand beach is still at the same area where Pontchartrain Beach once was. It is inaccessible and off limits to the general public, having been deemed hazardous due to underwater drop offs and riprap which pose dangers for swimmers.

Water quality had increased dramatically in recent decades and the sand beach was reopened at one point, until a pair of drownings occurred and the beach was re-closed. The Lake Pontchartrain Basin Foundation has undertaken the task of restoring Pontchartrain Beach for use as a public recreation area. While no opening date has been given officially, a phased approach was expected to begin in the summer of 2016.

In May 2023, the foundation’s proposal was rejected after two years of negotiations with the Lake Authority and neighborhood associations. NIMBYism and the shifting of all associated costs on the foundation led to the foundation ceasing to submit a new proposal. The foundation will support any other entity that arises to continue the effort to officially reopen the beach to the public.

== See also ==
- Lincoln Beach amusement park
- Six Flags New Orleans
