= Jay, New York =

- Town
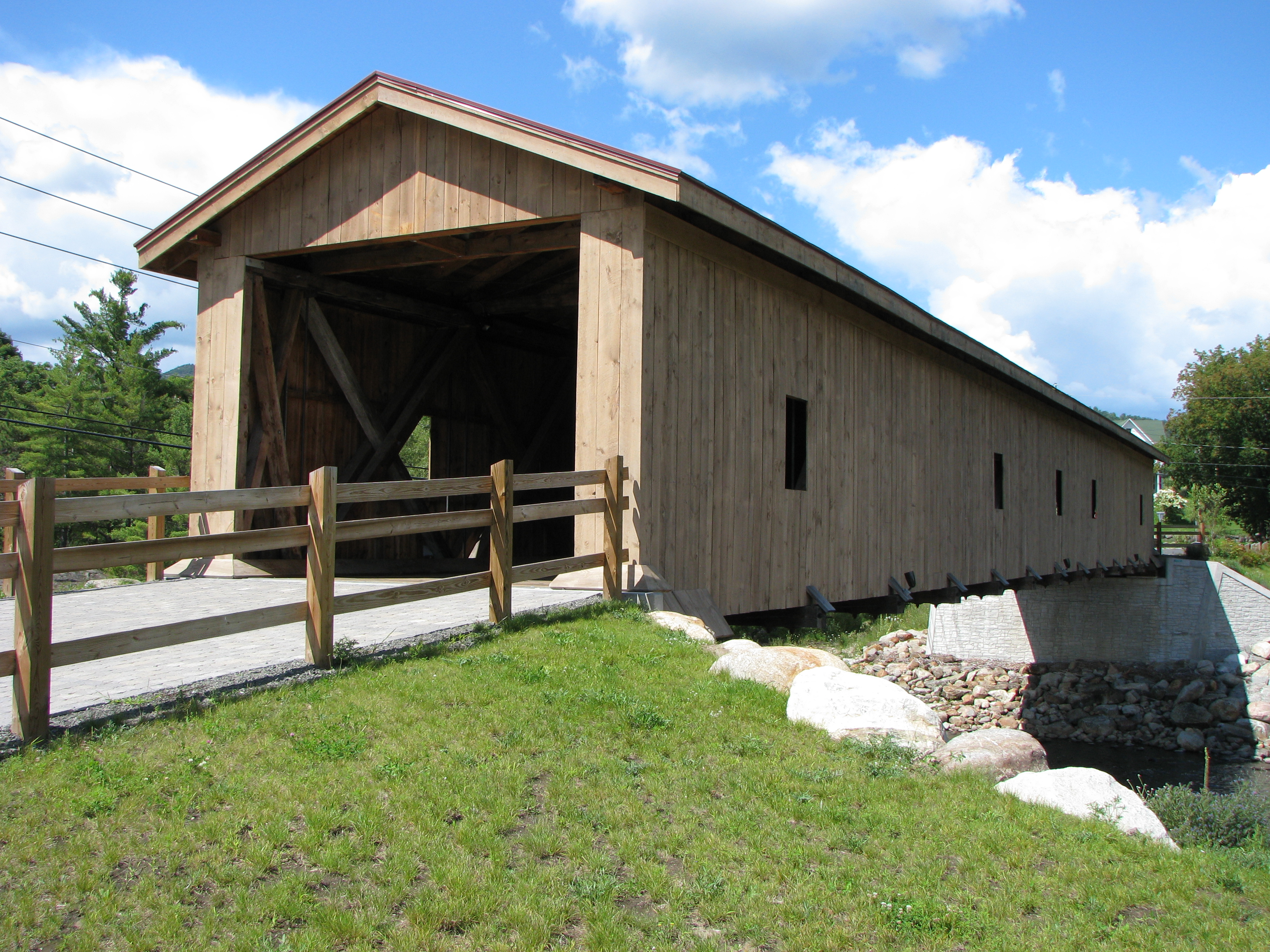
- Jay Bridge
- Motto: "Home of the Covered Bridge"
- Location in Essex County and the state of New York.
- Coordinates: 44°23′8″N 73°42′38″W
- Country: United States
- State: New York
- County: Essex

Government
  - Type: Town Council
  - Town Supervisor: Matthew J. Stanley (D)
  - Town Council: Members' List: • Knut Sauer (D); • Steve Forbes (R); • Adam Coolidge (R); • Thomas L. McDonald (R)

Area
  - Total: 68.11 sq mi (176.40 km^{2})
  - Land: 67.66 sq mi (175.24 km^{2})
  - Water: 0.45 sq mi (1.16 km^{2})
- Elevation: 837 ft (255 m)

Population (2020)
  - Total: 2,486
  - Density: 36.2/sq mi (13.97/km^{2})
- Time zone: UTC-5 (Eastern (EST))
  - Summer (DST): UTC-4 (EDT)
- ZIP Codes: 12941 (Jay); 12987 (Upper Jay); 12912 (Au Sable Forks)
- Area code: 518
- FIPS code: 36-031-38396
- GNIS feature ID: 0979105
- Website: townofjayny.gov

Jay is a town in Essex County, New York, United States. The population was 2,506 at the 2010 census. The town is named after John Jay, governor of New York when the town was formed.

The town is on the northern border of Essex County and is 34 miles (55 km) southwest of Plattsburgh, 93 miles (150 km) south of Montreal, and 135 miles (217 km) north of Albany. Jay is located inside the Adirondack Park.

== History ==
The area was originally known as "Mallory's Bush", after the principal settlement, based on early settler Nathaniel Mallory, who arrived around 1797..

The town of Jay, named in honor of New York Governor John Jay, was formed in January 1798 from part of the town of Willsboro. Afterwards, part of Jay was used to form, in whole or part, the towns of Keene (1808), Elizabethtown and Wilmington (1821). In 1822, the town was increased by territory from the town of Chateaugay (now in Franklin County), and the town of Peru (now in Clinton County).

Lumber production and iron ore extraction were important to the early economy of the town.

Land of Makebelieve, an amusement park (1954–1979), was located in Upper Jay.

== Geography ==
According to the United States Census Bureau, the town has a total area of 68.1 square miles (176.4 km^{2}), of which 67.7 square miles (175.3 km^{2}) is land and 1.1 square kilometres (0.42 sq mi), or 0.62%, is water.

The northern town line, partly defined by the Ausable River, is the border of Clinton County. The East Branch of the Ausable River flows northward the length of the town near the western town boundary.

New York State Route 9N is a north-south highway through the town, following the course of the East Branch of the Ausable. New York State Route 86 leads west from NY-9N at the hamlet of Jay.

== Demographics ==
Historical population
| Census | Pop. | Note | %± |
|---|---|---|---|
| 1820 | 1,647 | | — |
| 1830 | 1,729 | | 5.0% |
| 1840 | 2,258 | | 30.6% |
| 1850 | 2,688 | | 19.0% |
| 1860 | 2,514 | | −6.5% |
| 1870 | 2,496 | | −0.7% |
| 1880 | 2,443 | | −2.1% |
| 1890 | 1,933 | | −20.9% |
| 1900 | 1,744 | | −9.8% |
| 1910 | 2,231 | | 27.9% |
| 1920 | 2,226 | | −0.2% |
| 1930 | 2,153 | | −3.3% |
| 1940 | 2,226 | | 3.4% |
| 1950 | 2,181 | | −2.0% |
| 1960 | 2,257 | | 3.5% |
| 1970 | 2,132 | | −5.5% |
| 1980 | 2,221 | | 4.2% |
| 1990 | 2,244 | | 1.0% |
| 2000 | 2,306 | | 2.8% |
| 2010 | 2,506 | | 8.7% |
| 2020 | 2,486 | | −0.8% |
U.S. Decennial Census

As of the census of 2000, there were 2,306 people, 918 households, and 651 families residing in the town. The population density was 34.0 inhabitants per square mile (13.1/km^{2}). There were 1,443 housing units at an average density of 21.3 per square mile (8.2/km^{2}). The racial makeup of the town was 98.44% White, 0.30% African American, 0.22% Native American, 0.13% Asian, 0.17% Pacific Islander, 0.26% from other races, and 0.48% from two or more races. Hispanic or Latino of any race were 0.61% of the population.

There were 918 households, out of which 30.2% had children under the age of 18 living with them, 58.0% were married couples living together, 8.1% had a female householder with no husband present, and 29.0% were non-families. 23.6% of all households were made up of individuals, and 11.3% had someone living alone who was 65 years of age or older. The average household size was 2.50 and the average family size was 2.92.

In the town, the population was spread out, with 24.1% under the age of 18, 6.2% from 18 to 24, 28.2% from 25 to 44, 26.1% from 45 to 64, and 15.4% who were 65 years of age or older. The median age was 40 years. For every 100 females, there were 93.9 males. For every 100 females age 18 and over, there were 97.3 males.

The median income for a household in the town was $35,612, and the median income for a family was $39,954. Males had a median income of $29,145 versus $21,438 for females. The per capita income for the town was $16,673. About 6.9% of families and 8.7% of the population were below the poverty line, including 7.8% of those under age 18 and 11.7% of those age 65 or over.

== Communities and locations within the town ==
- Au Sable Acres – A private residential community in the northwestern part of town, comprising several hundred year-round inhabitants and seasonal residents. It is south of the West Branch of the Ausable River.
- Au Sable Forks – A hamlet on the northern town line, extending north into the town of Black Brook in Clinton County. The hamlet is centered around the confluence of the West and East Branches of the Ausable River.
- Green Street – A hamlet in the northeastern part of town, southeast of Au Sable Forks.
- North Jay – A hamlet in the northeastern section of the town, located on Stickney Bridge Road. It is south of Au Sable Forks and northeast of Jay hamlet.
- Jay (formerly "Mallory's Bush") – The hamlet of Jay was originally known as Lower Jay. It is on New York State Route 9N by the East Branch of the Ausable River and is considered the oldest settlement in the town. It is well known for its 1857 covered bridge which was located below the village green near the rapids, a very popular swimming hole. The 1857 bridge was deemed unsafe by the New York Department of Transportation and was closed, then removed. The new covered bridge has many original hand-hewed beams in the interior of the new construction and was officially opened as a footbridge in October 2007.
- Jersey Section – This small residential community is located across the Jersey Bridge at the end of Main Street in the south part of Au Sable Forks.
- Rome Section – A small residential area west of Au Sable Forks on the West Branch of the Au Sable River. The J & J Rogers Co. Pulp Mill and earlier Hydro Dam were located at the end of this road.
- Slab City A tiny community clustered along Rt.9N as you leave The Forks, and travel toward Jay. It was the site of a couple of former Lumber Mills... hence the name "Slab City".
- The Grove – Small community of residential homes along the main confluence of the Au Sable River, a half mile east of Au Sable Forks. This area had suffered recurring floods and ice jams since 1856. It was the first hamlet within the town of Jay to successfully secure a FEMA buyout in 1997 due to the massive devastation from November 9, 1996, flood. The Grove was originally known as The Flats until the name was changed after the deadly 1856 Great Freshet.
- Upper Jay (formerly "Mallory's Bush") – A hamlet in the southwestern corner of the township on NY-9N, on the East Branch of the Au Sable River. It was the location of the Land of Makebelieve amusement park by Arto Monaco. The park was lost due to recurring flooding and ice jams along the river. The Keith and Branch Ford Motors Factory and Showroom, Wells Memorial Library, and Wellscroft are listed on the National Register of Historic Places.

== Notable people ==
- Earl Finch (October 27, 1830 – June 11, 1888), Wisconsin State Assemblyman and lawyer
- Isaac Finch (October 13, 1783 – June 23, 1845), congressman
- Lewis W. Pierce (1810–1882), member of the New York State Assembly
- Chris Ortloff (September 20, 1947 – Present), Former New York State Assembly Member, convicted sex offender
