= Land of Makebelieve =

- Interactive map of Land of Makebelieve
- Location: Upper Jay, New York, United States
- Coordinates: 44.34°N 73.77°W
- Status: Defunct
- Opened: 1954
- Closed: 1979

The Land of Makebelieve was an amusement park located in the hamlet of Upper Jay, New York, United States. It was in operation from 1954 until 1979. The park was designed and built by Arto Monaco.

Monaco initially wanted to call the park Storytown, but another theme park with that name was already being built. Monaco chose the Land of Makebelieve as the park's name after listening to the song "It's Only Make Believe". The Land of Makebelieve was one of the first children's amusement parks in the United States. Children were free to wander around the park, while parents were encouraged to not interfere with their children's play. Attractions and points of interest, including a castle, riverboat, train, several fairy tale hours, and an old western town, were all built to half-scale, suitable for children age 12 and under.

The park suffered from several floods from the nearby Ausable River over its lifespan, and it permanently closed in 1979 after suffering extensive flooding damage. Some of the fairy tale houses that were undamaged were relocated to a similarly themed park located in Queensbury, New York. In fact it was the very same park that had taken the "Storytown" name. That park is now the Six Flags-owned Great Escape.

A 2006 Mountain Lake PBS documentary, "A Castle in Every Heart: The Monaco Story" chronicles the life and work of Arto Monaco (1913-2003), the pioneering designer and gifted storyteller who was also responsible for Santa’s Workshop, another nearby children's attraction in the North Pole hamlet of Wilmington, NY.

A restaurant in the park was later reopened as the Adirondack Mountain Cafe. As a result of flood waters generated by Hurricane Irene on August 28, 2011, the last remaining buildings from the former park, including the castle, were destroyed.
