= Wells Memorial Library =

- U.S. National Register of Historic Places
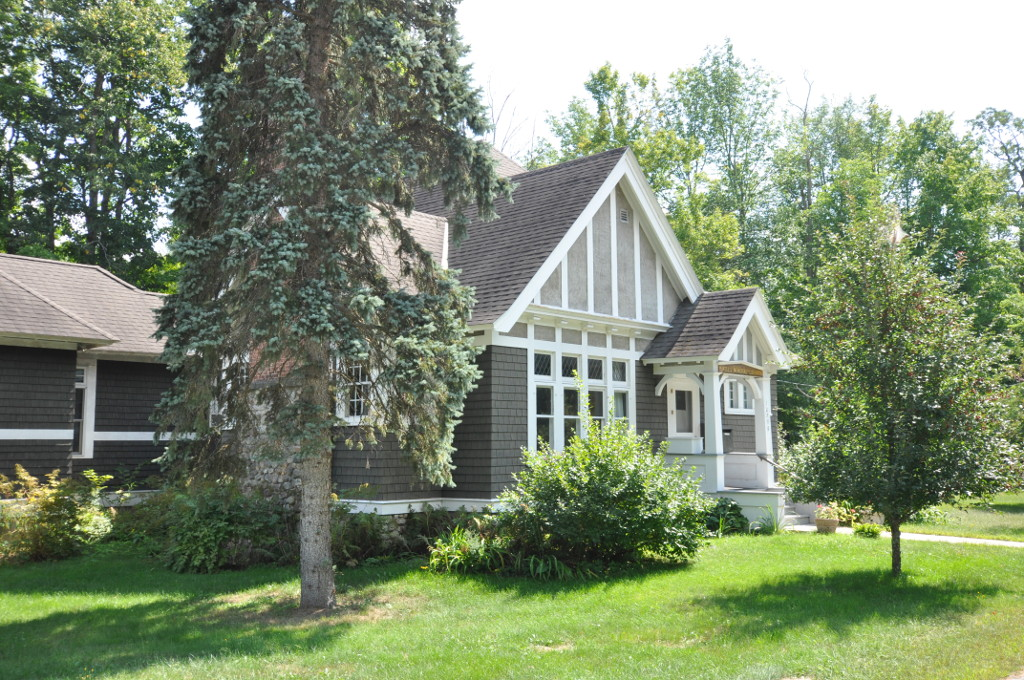

- Location within New York Location within the United States
- Location: 12230 NY 9N, Upper Jay, New York
- Coordinates: 44°20′17″N 73°46′25″W
- Area: 2.97 acres (1.20 ha)
- Built: 1907
- Architectural style: Tudor Revival, Arts and Crafts
- NRHP reference No.: 11000289
- Added to NRHP: May 18, 2011

Wells Memorial Library is a historic library building located at Upper Jay, Essex County, New York. It was built in 1907, and is a 1 1/2-story, square, frame building with Tudor Revival and Arts and Crafts design elements. It sits on a stone foundation and has a steep hipped roof with cross gables. It features stucco cladding, half-timbering, and narrow banks of multi-pane windows. An addition to the building was constructed in 2001.

It was added to the National Register of Historic Places in 2011.
