= Gaslight Village =

Defunct amusement park

- Location: Lake George, New York, New York, USA
- Status: Defunct
- Opened: 1959
- Closed: 1989

Gaslight Village was a Vaudeville themed amusement park in Lake George, New York. The park was located along New York State Route 9N, U.S. Route 9 and Warren County Route 69 (West Brook Road) in the village. It opened in 1959, designed by Arto Monaco and built by amusement park builder Charles Wood. The park was approximately 3-4 city blocks in size, and featured some standard amusement rides, (a Ferris wheel, merry-go-round, bumper cars, Tilt a Whirl, etc.) as well as some unusual rides. The main feature of the park was the Opera House where Vaudeville-style shows, including an Ice Show, melodramas, and a wide variety of stage acts performed all day and until lights-out each evening. The park was closed in 1989. Its site later became the now defunct Lake George Action Park.

== Charles R. Wood Park ==
In December 2010, it was reported that the Lake George Association, Lake George Land Conservancy, and other organizations had acquired the land and were demolishing the site in order to return the area to wetlands to filter water draining into Lake George, at a cost of up to $12 million.

In April 2012, it was announced that the foundation of Gaslight Village's late founder, the Charles R. Wood Foundation, contributed $750,000 towards a $1.8 million nature park, to be called Charles R. Wood Park. The park was officially dedicated on May 29, 2019 and offers concert and event space, a children's play area, a skate park, public bathrooms, a walking trail, a fountain and small pool, and a constructed wetland used to filter stormwater before reaching Lake George.

== See also ==
- Palisades Park
- Action Park
