= Alpine Freefalls =

Water slide complex at Six Flags Great Escape and Hurricane Harbor

Six Flags Great Escape and Hurricane Harbor
- Area: Hurricane Harbor
- Coordinates: 43°21′7.69″N 73°41′14.78″W
- Status: Operating
- Opening date: June 2, 2012

General statistics
- Manufacturer: ProSlide Technology
- Height: 60 ft (18 m)

Alpine Freefalls is a water slide complex manufactured by ProSlide Technology located at Six Flags Great Escape and Hurricane Harbor in Queensbury, New York, United States. It opened in 2012, and features 2 slides: Wahoo Racer and Paradise Plunge.

When the complex first opened, the slides were known as Twisted Racer and Cliffhanger. They were eventually rethemed to a paradisical theme, and are not referred to as Alpine Freefalls as a collective slide complex anymore, instead simply being referred to as their own individual slides.

== History ==
On August 22, 2011, the park teased that big news was "coming soon". On September 1, 2011, the park announced Alpine Freefalls for the 2012 season. Alpine Freefalls opened to the public on June 2, 2012, a few weeks after Splashwater Kingdom (which would be renamed to Hurricane Harbor in 2019) opened for the season.

== Slides ==
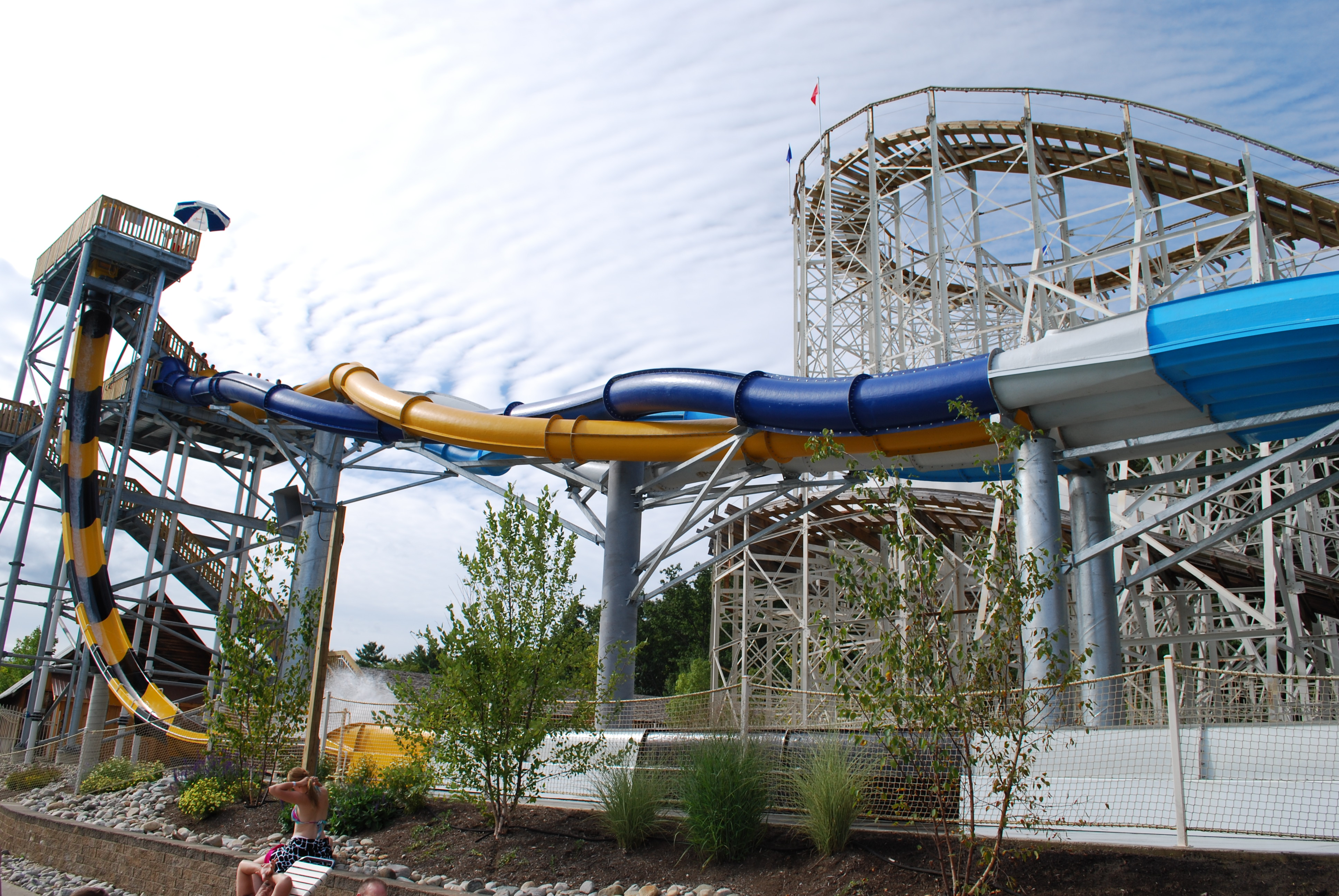
The slide complex in 2012

=== Paradise Plunge ===
Paradise Plunge was the park's first drop-launch capsule slide, featuring SkyBOX technology. The slide is over 10 stories tall. Riders enter the "skybox", a capsule with a door, the capsule's trapdoor floor opens beneath the rider's feet. The rider will freefall at up to 40 miles per hour (64 km/h) down the slide on a nearly 90 degree drop into six inches of water. Riders must be at least 48 inches tall.

=== Wahoo Racer ===
Wahoo Racer was the Northeast's first mat racer slide, and is a KrakenRACER model. The attraction is 60 feet tall, and features four slide lanes. Riders enter the slides headfirst on mats, racing each other through the intertwined enclosed slides before exiting into a straight shot to the finish line at speeds of up to 40 feet per second. Riders must be at least 42 inches tall.

== See also ==
- 2012 in amusement parks
