= The Comet (Great Escape) =

Roller coaster at Great Escape in New York

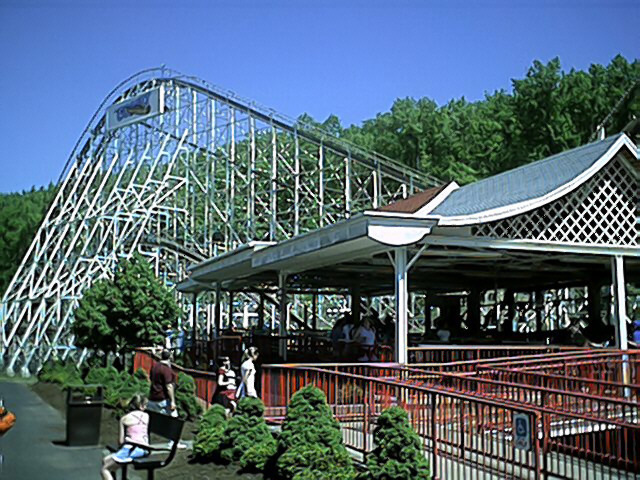
- Station and lift hill of The Comet

Great Escape
- Location: Great Escape
- Park section: Fest Area
- Coordinates: 43°21′4.91″N 73°41′6.23″W
- Status: Operating
- Opening date: 1948 (Crystal Beach Park); June 25, 1994 (relocation to Six Flags Great Escape and Hurricane Harbor)

General statistics
- Type: Wood
- Manufacturer: Philadelphia Toboggan Coasters
- Designer: Herbert Paul Schmeck
- Model: Wooden coaster
- Track layout: Double out and back
- Lift/launch system: Chain lift hill
- Height: 95 ft (29 m)
- Drop: 87 ft (27 m)
- Length: 4,197 ft (1,279 m)
- Speed: 55 mph (89 km/h)
- Duration: 2:00
- Height restriction: 48 in (122 cm)
- Trains: 2 trains with 4 cars; riders arranged 2 across in 3 rows for a total of 24 riders per train
- Fast Lane available
- The Comet at RCDB

The Comet is a hybrid wooden roller coaster located at Great Escape in Queensbury, New York, United States.

The roller coaster originally operated at Crystal Beach Park, where it was built from parts of the Crystal Beach Cyclone. It opened in 1948, and operated there until 1989. The coaster was relocated and reopened at Six Flags Great Escape in 1994.

== History ==
The coaster began its existence at Crystal Beach Park in Fort Erie, Ontario as a ride known as Cyclone, which opened in 1927. It closed in 1946, and its metal support structure was reused in the creation of a new coaster, which would come to be known as The Comet when it opened in 1948. When the park closed in 1989, Charles Wood, owner of The Great Escape Fun Park and Fantasy Island, successfully bid for the ride. It sat in storage for a few years at Fantasy Island before making its way to The Great Escape Fun Park, where it reopened in 1994. The ride was reconstructed by Martin & Vleminckx.

On September 8, 2009, American Coaster Enthusiasts named The Comet a Coaster Landmark.

== Ride experience ==
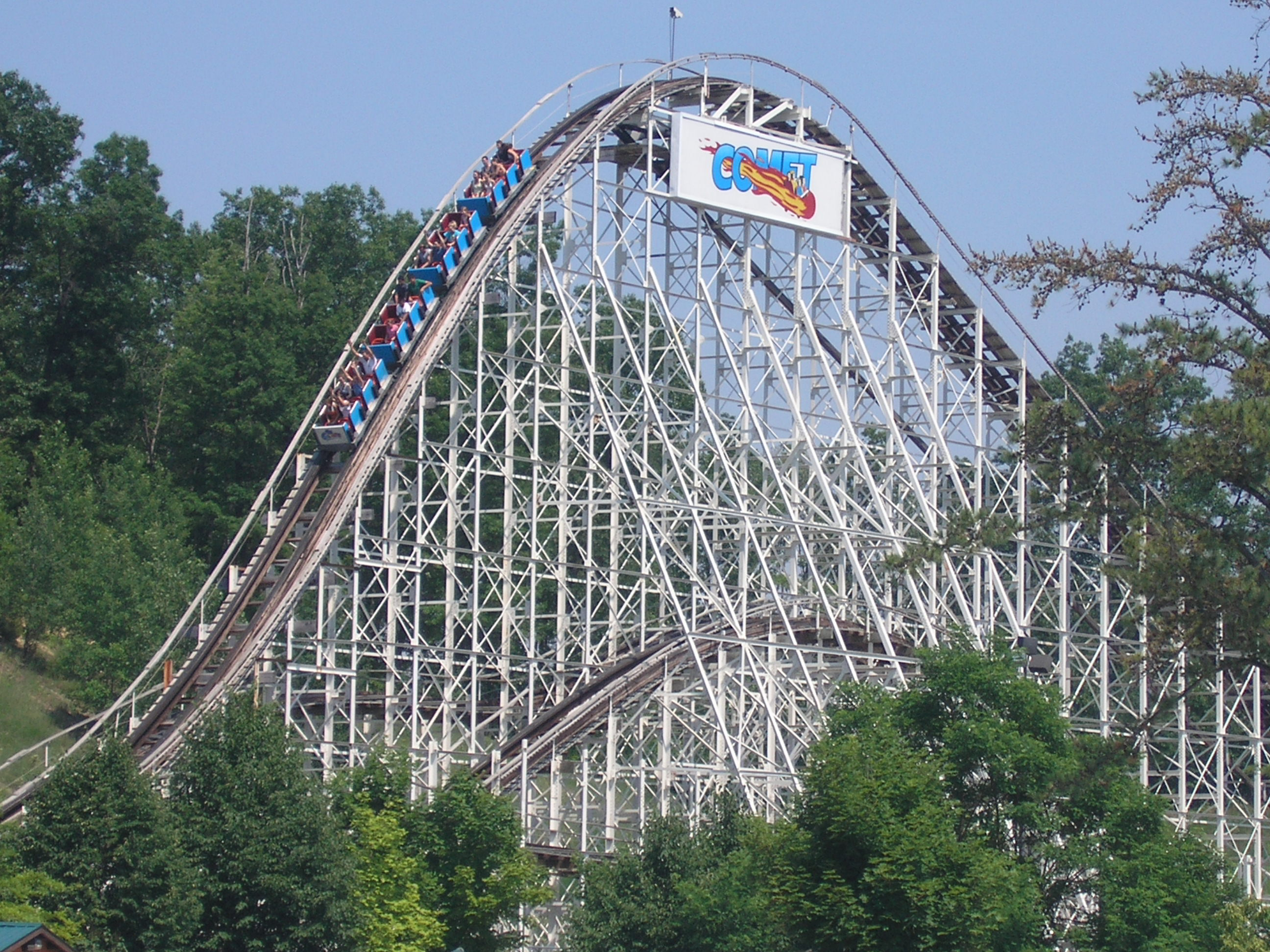
Blue train descending the first drop

The ride is 95 feet (29 m) tall and has a first drop of 87 feet (27 m). It is 4,197 feet (1,279 m) long and reaches a top speed of 55 mph (89 km/h).

The coaster operates two trains, one red and one blue, each capable of carrying 24 riders in four cars of three rows seating two across. There is a minimum height requirement of 48 inches (1.2 m) to ride.

== Awards ==
Golden Ticket Awards: Top wood Roller Coasters
Year									1998	1999
Ranking									4	5
Year	2000	2001	2002	2003	2004	2005	2006	2007	2008	2009
Ranking	10	9	12	14	12	20	22	19	29	29
Year	2010	2011	2012	2013	2014	2015	2016	2017	2018	2019
Ranking	17	19	20	16	18	24	25 (tie)	32	32	19
Year	2020	2021	2022	2023	2024	2025	2026			
Ranking	N/A	20	23	25	27	28	15			
