= Double "H" Ranch =

- Interactive map of Double "H" Ranch
- Coordinates: 43.375069°N 73.788811°W
- Owner: Charles R. Wood & Paul Newman ceo = Alison Wilcox
- Established: 1992
- Website: www.doublehranch.org

The Double H Ranch, co-founded in 1992 by Charles R. Wood and Paul Newman, provides specialized programs and year-round support for children and their families dealing with life-threatening illnesses. The Ranch's purpose is to enrich their lives and provide camp experiences that are memorable, exciting, fun, empowering, physically safe and medically sound.

== History ==
Founded by Paul Newman and Charles R. Wood, Double H Ranch opened on July 4th, 1993. The camp was originally founded as the Hidden Valley "Dude" Ranch in 1939, acting as the largest dude ranch in the Adirondack Mountains until its closure. The property was sold to Charles R. Wood and Paul Newman through auction in 1991. Due to the preexisting structures on the property, the property only required renovations to create a medically safe camp for children.

Through the years, Double H Ranch has established many programs for children battling with chronic or life-threatening disabilities or illnesses, including their summer camp, adaptive winter sports program, spring & fall weekend program, and outreach program.

Throughout its history, Double H Ranch has been funded due to the contributions of the Newman's Own Foundation, corporate donations, and the donations of regular people, allowing for every camper to come to camp free of charge. With the creation of Double H Ranch, a network of camps would be founded, later to be known as Seriousfun Children's Network, all supporting the same causes of giving children at a medical disadvantage and their siblings life-changing experiences that they may not get to experience normally, with the goal of providing "health and happiness" to campers, (hence the name Double "H").

== Principles ==
A fundamental principle of the camp is that no child should be denied the joys of childhood due to an illness or physical limitation, nor should they be restricted due to a family’s financial situation. Thus, all programs are free of charge. The Double H relies on the support of individuals, corporations, civic organizations and foundations.

The Double H offers activities which essentially define childhood; carefree play, interaction with peers, the expression of creativity through arts, song and sports. Programs allow children with Cancer, Leukemia, Sickle-Cell Anemia, Hemophilia, HIV/AIDS and Neuromuscular impairments the chance to grow both physically and emotionally.

== Programs ==
In the summer camp program, children with life-threatening and debilitating illnesses which prevent them from attending other camps stay for a week in one of the cabins on site. They can participate in activities such as zip lining, fishing, archery, and horseback riding and numerous other activities that are offered. Nurses and medical staff are able to provide all medical care necessary to ensure their safety.

In addition to the summer camp experience, Double H Ranch also offers an Adaptive Winter Sports Program. The Winter Program offers children ages 6–18 with chronic and life-threatening illnesses the opportunity to participate in various winter sports in the beautiful Adirondack Mountains. Activities include alpine and Nordic skiing, as well as snowboarding and snow shoeing.

In keeping with its mission, the Double H also provides the venue for weekends sponsored by a number of family based support programs throughout the year. These weekends serve families coping with HIV/AIDS, cancer, the loss of a child or parent, bleeding disorders, spina bifida, a child with autism, and many more.

The Double H hosts several major events throughout the year to support its programs as well as camper sponsorship fundraising initiatives. The Double H offers numerous volunteer opportunities and corporate sponsorships in support of its campers.

== Notable people ==
Paul Newman is one of the camp's co-founders, along with philanthropist Charles R. Wood. Proceeds from some of Newman's Own products are donated to this and its related camps. NBA Referee Dick Bavetta has had a presence at the camp in the past. Also, actor Liam Aiken has volunteered there as a counselor in the past. In 2014, Robert Irvine from Restaurant: Impossible visited the camp and helped transform and renovate it.

== See also ==
- SeriousFun Children's Network
