= Charles Wood (businessman) =

American amusement park developer

- Died: September 30, 2004 (aged 89–90)
- Known for: Amusement park development

Charles R. Wood (1914 – September 30, 2004) was an American amusement park developer and philanthropist in Upstate New York.

== Early life ==
Wood was born in Lockport, New York, in 1914.

== Career ==
After seeing the amusement park Knott's Berry Farm in southern California he was inspired in 1954 to open his own park in Queensbury, New York, which he named Storytown USA. In order to do this, he needed some loans from local banks. With $500 in his pocket at the time, he walked into a bank, applied for the necessary loans, and was denied. To this, he replied to the bank manager "One day sir, I will be able to buy and sell you." Success followed this Mother Goose themed park and in 1959 he opened a second amusement park in the village of Lake George, New York, this one named Gaslight Village, which closed in 1989. Storytown USA changed its name to The Great Escape in 1983 and was eventually sold to new owners in 1996, finally winding up under the Six Flags park umbrella. Wood purchased Fantasy Island in 1983 and owned it until 1989. He would later own the park again from 1992 through 1994.

=== Charles R. Wood Foundation ===
Wood became a philanthropist for northern New York state through his Charles R. Wood Foundation, donating money to libraries and hospitals and providing seed money for a theater in downtown Glens Falls, New York, which was later named for him, as well as Charles R. Wood Park, a nature park and restored wetland area on the site of Gaslight Village.

In 1993, Wood co-founded, with actor Paul Newman, the Double "H" Ranch, a SeriousFun Camp for critically ill children.

== Death ==
Wood died of cancer at age 90 on September 30, 2004 near Glens Falls, New York.
