= Great Escape (amusement park) =

Amusement and water park in Queensbury, New York

Great Escape by Enchanted Parks
- Previously known as Storytown USA (1954–1982); The Great Escape Fun Park (1983–1994); The Great Escape & Splashwater Kingdom (1995–2011); Great Escape: A Six Flags Theme Park (2012-2018); Six Flags Great Escape and Hurricane Harbor (2019–2026)
- Logo used since October 2026

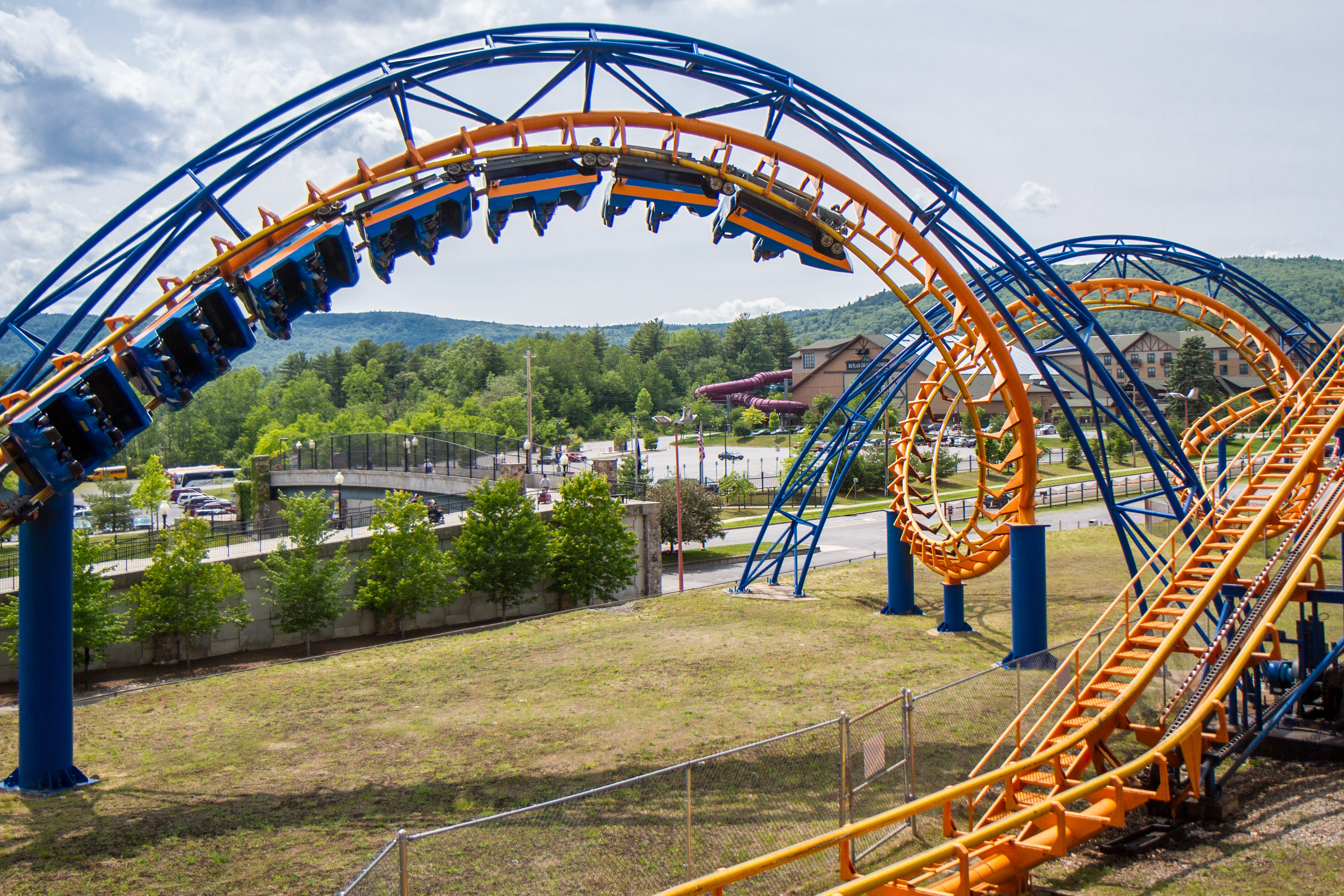
- Steamin' Demon, located near the front of Great Escape
- Interactive map of Great Escape by Enchanted Parks
- Location: 89 Six Flags Drive; Queensbury, New York
- Coordinates: 43.350991°N 73.690112°W
- Opened: 1954; 72 years ago
- Owner: EPR Properties
- Operated by: Enchanted Parks
- Slogan: New York's Most Thrilling Theme Park
- Operating season: May through October
- Area: 351 acres (142 ha)

Attractions
- Total: 34 (excluding water park); 47 (including water park)
- Roller coasters: 6
- Water rides: 13
- Website: greatescapeparks.enchantedparks.com

Great Escape by Enchanted Parks, also known as Great Escape Resort, is an amusement and water park located in Queensbury, New York. Operated by Enchanted Parks, the park features 34 attractions, a water park named Hurricane Harbor, and a hotel named Great Escape Lodge.

The park originally opened in 1954 as Storytown USA. It was acquired by Premier Parks (later Six Flags) in 1996 and adopted the Six Flags brand in 2019 when it was renamed Six Flags Great Escape and Hurricane Harbor. Six Flags sold the park to EPR Properties in April 2026, and rebranded itself to simply Great Escape soon after.

== History ==
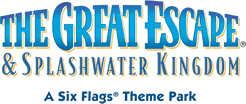
Logo used until 2012

The park opened in 1954 as Storytown USA, a Mother Goose-themed amusement park owned by businessman Charles Wood, who bought the land with his wife for $75,000. In 1957, after realizing that the park was lacking in attractions appealing to older children, the Ghost Town area was added, the first of many themed areas opened in the park's history. In 1960, another themed area would be added in the form of Jungleland. In 1971, the park opened its first roller coaster.

In 1983, the park changed its name from Storytown USA to The Great Escape Fun Park.

In 1984, the park introduced Steamin' Demon. In 1994, the park would open another roller coaster, The Comet. The Comet already had a 41-year history of operation at Crystal Beach Park in Niagara Falls, Ontario. After the park's closure, Charles Wood, the owner of The Great Escape Fun Park and Fantasy Island in Grand Island, New York, successfully bid for The Comet. It sat in storage for a few years at Fantasy Island before making its way to The Great Escape Fun Park.

In 1995, the park's water park, then known as Splashwater Kingdom, was introduced. In 1996, Charles Wood sold the park to Premier Parks, who would later go on to purchase the Six Flags company. Unlike most of the other parks owned by the company, Great Escape was not rebranded as a Six Flags park immediately following this purchase, and would not take on the Six Flags name until 2019.

In 2005 and 2006, Looney Tunes and DC branding would be brought into the park, respectively. In February 2006, The Six Flags Great Escape Lodge & Indoor Waterpark opened. The lodge includes a 38,000 square feet (3,500 m^{2}) water park exclusively for lodge guests. In 2009, the park hosted Holiday in the Park for a single season. In 2010, the park would reintroduce some of the Mother Goose themes that existed when the park was first created.

On September 11, 2020, the park announced that it would remain closed for the 2020 season due to the COVID-19 pandemic. All season passes and tickets were carried over to the 2021 season. In 2024, the park introduced The Bobcat, a family wooden roller coaster.

On March 5, 2026, it was announced that Six Flags Great Escape, alongside several other Six Flags parks, would be sold to EPR Properties. The sale was completed on April 6, 2026, though the park will retain the Six Flags brand for the 2026 season.

In addition to amusement rides, the park offers a variety of live shows.

== Current attractions ==
=== Themed areas ===
- Fest Area – Bavarian-themed
- Ghost Town – Old West-themed. Opened in 1957.
- Storytown – Mother Goose-themed. Opened in 2010.
- Hot Rod USA – Race car-themed. Opened in 2016.
- Timbertown – A children's area. Themed as Jungleland from 1960 to 2004, and as Looney Tunes National Park from 2005 to 2010.
- Hurricane Harbor – A water park. Formerly called Splashwater Kingdom. Entrance to Hurricane Harbor is included with general admission to the dry park.

=== Roller coasters ===
Name	Area	Picture	Manufacturer	Type	Year opened	Notes
Canyon Blaster	Ghost Town		Arrow Development	Steel mine train coaster	2003	Originally located at Opryland USA from 1972 to 1997
Flashback	Hot Rod USA		Vekoma	Steel shuttle coaster (Boomerang)	1997	Originally called Boomerang: Coast to Coaster
Frankie's Mine Train	Timbertown		Zamperla	Steel children's coaster	2005	Known as Road Runner Express from 2005 to 2010
Steamin' Demon	Ghost Town		Arrow Development	Steel coaster	1984	Originally located at Pontchartrain Beach as Ragin' Cajun from 1978 to 1983
The Bobcat	Fest Area		The Gravity Group	Wooden coaster	2024	
The Comet	Fest Area		Philadelphia Toboggan Coasters	Out-and-back wooden coaster	1994	Originally located at Crystal Beach Park from 1948 to 1989

=== Family rides ===
Name	Area	Manufacturer	Type	Year opened	Notes
Alice in Wonderland	Fest Area	Unknown	Walkthrough	1967	A walkthrough themed to Alice's Adventures in Wonderland by Lewis Carroll.
Balloon Race	Fest Area	Zamperla	Balloon Race	1989	
Blizzard	Fest Area	Eli Bridge Company	Scrambler	1971	Enclosed in a building. Originally called Chipper's Magical Mystery Tour.
Cannonball Express	Fest Area	Mack Rides	Music Express	1985	
Grand Carousel	Storytown	Chance	Carousel	1989	Features horses and fantasy creatures
Marshal's Stampede Indoor Bumper Cars	Ghost Town	Mac Duce	Bumper cars	1985	
Screamin' Eagles	Fest Area	Larson International	Flying Scooters	2013	
Sky Ride	Fest Area	Universal Design Ltd.	Chairlift	1960s	
Storytown Houses	Storytown	Unknown	Play area	Unknown	
Storytown Train	Storytown	Chance Rides	Rideable miniature railway	1956	
Swan Boats	Storytown	Adventureglass	Paddleboats	1950s	Refurbished in 2024
Thunder Alley	Storytown	Arrow Development	Turnpike cars	1970s	

=== Thrill rides ===
Name	Area	Manufacturer	Model	Year opened	Notes
Adirondack Outlaw	Ghost Town	Funtime	Vomatron	2021	
Condor	Ghost Town	HUSS Park Attractions	Condor	1990	
Extreme Supernova	Fest Area	Zamperla	Pendulum	2014	Previously operated as Eclipse at Luna Park from 2010 to 2013
Pandemonium	Fest Area	Chance Rides	Wipeout	2018	
Greezed Lightnin'	Hot Rod USA	Larson International	Fire Ball	2016	
Sasquatch	Hot Rod USA	S&S Power	Turbo Drop / Space Shot drop tower	2009	Includes a drop tower and a launch tower side. The ride was originally located at Six Flags New Orleans, where it was named Bayou Blaster and Sonic Slam. In 2017, a VR experience was temporarily added to the attraction.

=== Upcharge rides ===
Name	Area	Manufacturer	Model	Year opened	Notes
Dare Devil Dive	Fest Area	Skycoaster, Inc.	Skycoaster	2001	Formerly called Skycoaster
Olympiad Grand Prix Go-Carts	Fest Area	J&J Amusements	Go-karts		

=== Water rides ===
Name	Area	Manufacturer	Model	Year opened	Notes
Desperado Plunge	Ghost Town	Arrow Development	Log flume	1979	Relocated from Busch Gardens Van Nuys after the park closed in 1979
Raging River	Fest Area	Intamin	River rapids	1986	

=== Children's rides ===
Name	Area	Manufacturer	Type	Year opened	Notes
Convoy	Fest Area	Zamperla	Truck ride	1987	
Hootie's Treehouse	Timbertown	Zamperla	Miniature drop tower	2005	Known as Tweety Treehouse from 2005 to 2010
Oakley's Honey Swings	Timbertown	Zamperla	Swing ride	2005	Known as Taz Twister from 2005 to 2010
Ranger Randy's Scenic Railway	Timbertown	Zamperla	Miniature train	2005	Known as Elmer Fudd Scenic Railway from 2005 to 2010
Sheldon's Speedway	Timbertown	Zamperla	Race car track	2005	Known as Speedy Gonzales Camptown Racers from 2005 to 2010. Relocated from Six Flags Great Adventure.
Spruce's Wilderness Bus Tours	Timbertown	Zamperla	Crazy Bus	2005	Known as Daffy Duck Wilderness Bus Tour from 2005 to 2010

=== Hurricane Harbor ===
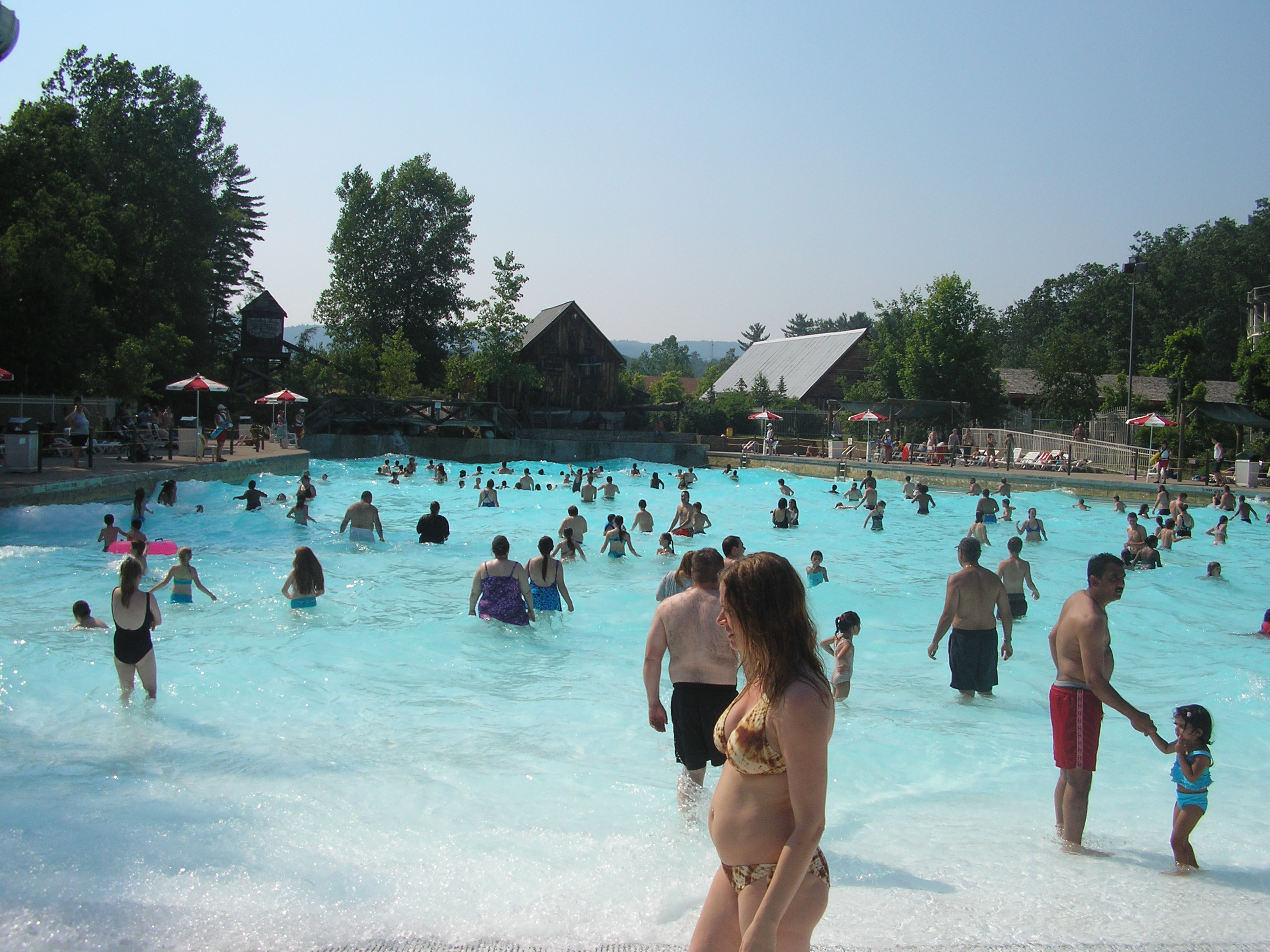
Hurricane Bay wave pool in 2006

Name	Opened	Description
Adventure River	1995	Lazy river. Previously called Capt'n Hook's Adventure River from 1995 to 2018.
Alpine Freefalls	2012	Slide complex featuring Wahoo Racer (ProSlide Technology KrakenRacer) and Paradise Plunge (ProSlide Technology trapdoor slide). Previously called Twisted Racer and Cliffhanger.
Bamboo Shoots	1995	Three thrilling water slides including (Twister Falls, Banshee Plunge & Blue Typhoon). Previously called Kingdom Cascades
Big Kahuna	2008	ProSlide Technology CannonBOWL slide. Previously called Mega Wedgie.
Bonzai Pipelines	2017	Body slide complex
Buccaneer Beach	2015	Water play area with small slides and water features. Previously called Noah's Sprayground.
Bucket Blasters	2019	Zamperla Watermania
Hurricane Bay	1997	Wave pool. Previously called Lumberjack Splash.
Island Air Adventures	2008	Spinning plane ride. Previously known as Big Red Planes (2008 to 2010) and ZoomJets (2011 to 2018). Was originally part of the dry park, but now operates as part of the water park.
Shipwreck Cove	2019	Water play area
Splashwater Island	1997	A water play area featuring five body slides and several water features. Previously called Paul Bunyan's Bucket Brigade from 1997 to 2018.
Tornado	2007	ProSlide Technology Tornado slide
Typhoon Twister	1995	A pair of enclosed raft water slides. Previously called Black Cobra.

== Former attractions ==
Ride	Year opened	Year closed	Description
99 Trains	Unknown	2006	Children's train
Alpine Bobsled	1998	2023	Intamin bobsled roller coaster
AstroWheel	1969	1992	Chance Rides AstroWheel
Balloon Ferris Wheel	1980s	2014	Ferris wheel
Bucky's Shore Patrol	2005	2014	Spinning boat ride. Previously known as Yosemite Sam Shore Patrol from 2005 to 2010.
Carousel	1965	1989	Carousel. Originally operated at Freedomland U.S.A.
Cinderella Coach	1954	Unknown	While the coach is no longer pulled by live horses, it is still available for stationary pictures with Cinderella
Cinema 180	Unknown	Late 1990s	Theatre later converted to an arcade then used for storage
Danny the Dragon	1965	1996	Arrow Development scenic ride with dragon-shaped cars. Originally operated at Freedomland U.S.A.
Dragon Ride	Unknown	2009	Children's dragon ride
Flying Bobs	1993	1998	Matterhorn
Flying Trapeze	1993	2022	Chance Rides swing ride
Ghost Town Railroad	1957	2002	Arrow Development train
Giant Wheel	1989	2019	Chance Rides Ferris wheel
Krazy Kars	2008	2018	Car ride. Previously called Big Red Cars from 2008 to 2010. Closed in 2018 with the rest of Kidzopolis to make way for the Hurricane Harbor water park expansion.
Krazy Kups	2008	2018	Teacups ride. Previously called Dorothy's Rosy Red Tea Cups from 2008 to 2010. Closed in 2018 with the rest of Kidzopolis to make way for the Hurricane Harbor water park expansion.
Motorcycles	Unknown	2009	Children's motorcycle ride
Nightmare at Crack Axle Canyon	1999	2006	Indoor roller coaster located in Ghost Town. The building still stands and is used as a haunted house during Fright Fest. Previously operated at Beech Bend (Jet Star, 1968 to 1984), Noble Park Funland (Jet Star, 1985 to 1986), Kentucky Kingdom (Starchaser, 1987 to 1995), and Six Flags Darien Lake (Nightmare At Phantom Cave, 1996 to 1998).
Noah's Ark	Unknown	2009	Children's swinging ship
Octopus	Unknown	Early 90s	Eyerly Aircraft Company Octopus
Petting Zoo	1954	2010	Petting zoo
Pirate Ship	1995	2013	HUSS Park Attractions Pirate ship
Rainbow	1982	2007	HUSS Park Attractions Rainbow. Previously known as Screamer from 1982 to 1986, when it was a Ranger. Modified in 1987 to become a Rainbow.
Rocky's Ranger Planes	2005	2025	Chance Rides spinning plane ride, relocated from Six Flags Great Adventure. Known as Bugs Bunny Ranger Pilots from 2005 to 2010. Removed from the park at the end of the 2025 season.
Rotor	1983	2001	Rotor
Sea Dragon	1980	1994	Swinging ship
Skylab	1986	2000	HUSS Park Attractions Skylab
Splish Splash Zone	2008	2018	Water play area. Previously called S.S. Feathersword's Playship from 2008 to 2010. Closed in 2018 with the rest of Kidzopolis to make way for the Hurricane Harbor water park expansion.
Starship Kaleidoscope	Unknown	Unknown	Teacups
Tip Top	Unknown	Unknown	
Tornado	1967	2002	Dark ride that took riders through the eye of a tornado in the Midwest. Originally operated at Freedomland U.S.A., and later at Kennywood.
Trabant	1969	2010	Chance Rides Trabant
Tumble Weed	1979	1988	Chance Rides Skydiver
