= DelGrosso's Park =

Amusement park in Tipton, Pennsylvania

- Previously known as Bland's Park (1909-2000); DelGrosso's Amusement Park (2000-2019)
- Interactive map of DelGrosso's Park
- Location: Tipton, Pennsylvania, U.S.
- Coordinates: 40.6358°N 78.2961°W
- Opened: 1909
- Owner: The DelGrosso family of companies
- Slogan: "The home of family fun and famous food!"
- Area: 79 acres (32 ha)

Attractions
- Total: 31
- Roller coasters: 2
- Water rides: 8
- Website: https://www.mydelgrossopark.com/

DelGrosso's Park is a family-oriented amusement park in Tipton, Pennsylvania. The park opened in 1909, and was purchased by the DelGrosso family in 1946.

The park includes 23 rides and an adjacent Italian-themed water park, Laguna Splash, the latter of which opened in 1997. The park also hosts picnics and special music events.

== History ==
The park was opened by the Rinard brothers on the Blands' family farm in 1907 and was originally called Bland's Park. In 1946, it was purchased by Ferdinand "Fred" DelGrosso, at which time the park was home to a number of rides installed by the Rinards, including the current carousel. Since purchasing the park, the DelGrosso family continued to invest in it with various rides and attractions, such as the addition of a water park in 1997, and expansions in 1999 and 2016. Even after the purchase of the park by the DelGrossos, the park retained the Bland's Park name until 2000, when it was renamed DelGrosso's Amusement Park.

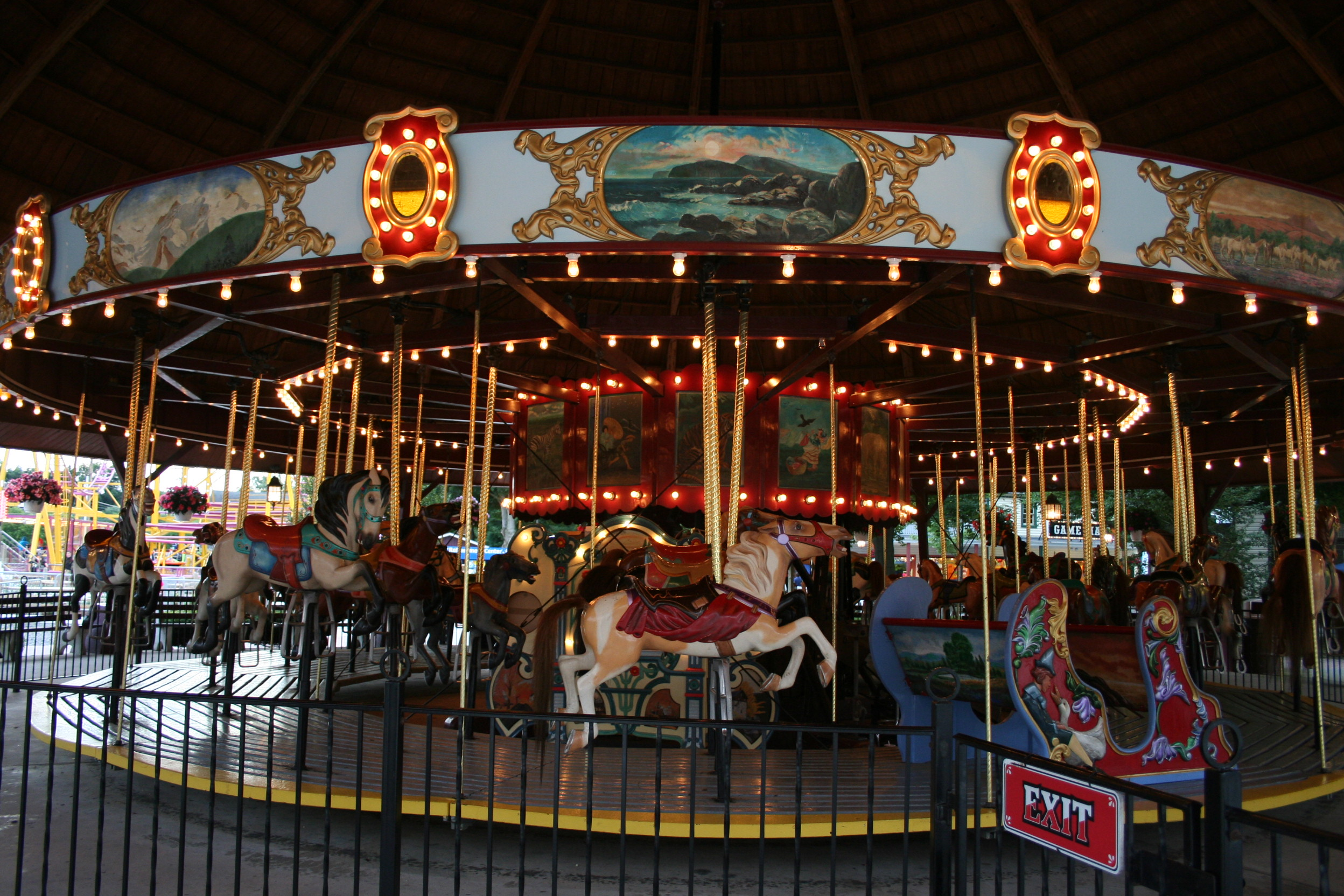
The park's 1924 carousel

== Current rides and attractions ==
=== Roller coasters ===
Coaster	Opened	Manufacturer	Type
Crazy Mouse	2004	Reverchon Industries	Steel spinning roller coaster (wild mouse)
Wacky Worm	2004	Fajume	Steel children's roller coaster

=== Thrill rides ===
Rides	Opened	Manufacturer	Type	Notes
Rock Star	2015	A.R.M. Rides	Ali Baba	
X-Scream Tower	2010	A.R.M. Rides	Drop tower	Purchased from Cypress Gardens

=== Family rides ===
Rides	Opened	Manufacturer	Type	Notes
Carouselle	1924	Herschell–Spillman Company	Carousel	
Dizzy Dragon	2009	Chance Rides	Dizzy Dragons	
Dodgem	1996	Majestic Manufacturing	Bumper cars	Rebuilt after the park's original Dodgem was destroyed during a blizzard in 1994
Free Fall	2004	Moser Rides	Drop tower	
Paratrooper	1987	Reverchon Industries	Paratrooper	
Pharaoh's Fury	2009	Chance Rides	Swinging ship	Purchased from Cypress Gardens
Scrambler	1985	Eli Bridge Company	Scrambler	
Super Spiral	1996	Frank Hrubetz & Company	Super Round Up	
Swing Buggy	2012	Bertazzon	Matterhorn	
Tilt-A-Whirl	1979	Sellner Manufacturing	Tilt-A-Whirl	
Tipton Creek Railroad	1988	Chance Rides	(2 ft (610 mm) narrow gauge railway	
Yo-Yo	2009	Chance Rides	Yo-Yo	Purchased from Cypress Gardens

=== Children's rides ===
Rides	Opened	Manufacturer	Type
Boats	1957	Allan Herschell Company	Spinning boat ride
Corvettes	1980s	Hampton Amusement Company	Spinning car ride
Fire Trucks	Unknown	Hampton Amusement Company	Spinning fire truck ride
Helicopters	1980s	Allan Herschell Company	Spinning helicopter ride
Kiddie Carousel	1992	W.F. Mangels Company	Miniature carousel
Turtles	1990	R. E. Chambers Company	Miniature Tumble Bug
Whales	Unknown	Eyerly Aircraft Company	Bulgy the Whale

== Laguna Splash water park ==
The water park opened in 1997 with the addition of Tipton Waterworks, a children's water play structure with three small water slides and several water features. In 1999, the second phase of the water park opened, featuring five large water slides known collectively as Tipton Rapids.

After many years without any new additions, the water park received a $12.5 million expansion in 2016, which saw the addition of a lazy river, a wave pool, a children's activity pool, five new refreshment stands, and a new entrance plaza. The water park was also given the name Laguna Splash, as it previously had no official name.

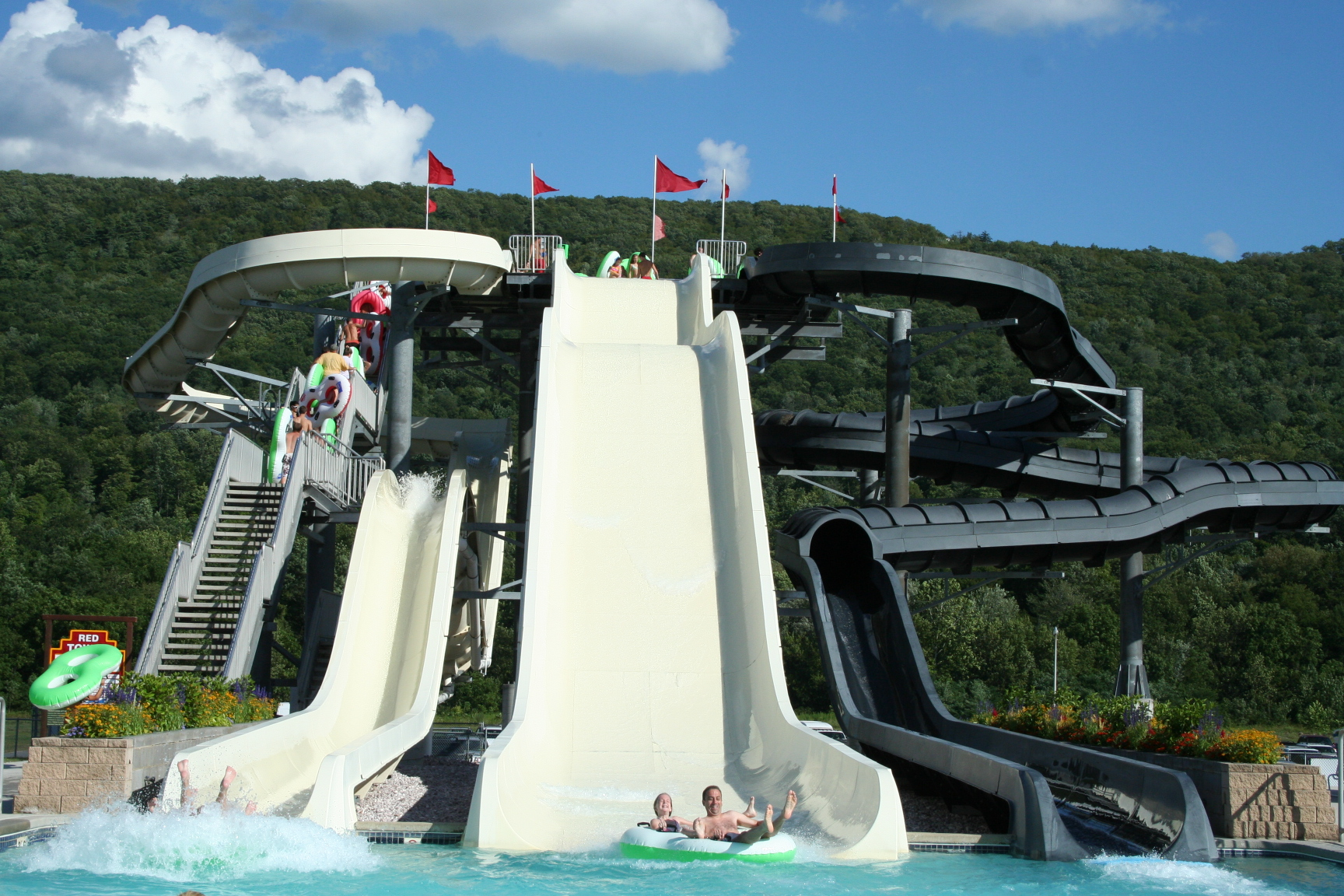
Laguna Slides Red Tower in 2008

=== Attractions ===
Laguna Slides Formerly Tipton Rapids (1999–2016)
Name	Opened	Slide tower	Description
Gravity Groove	1999	Red Tower	A water slide where riders travel down a drop into an uphill section before dropping again
Great White	1999	Red Tower	A water slide with a steep double-dip drop
Midnight Express	1999	Red Tower	An enclosed water slide with many twist and turns
Twin Twister	1999	Green Tower	Two identical water slides where riders can race each other

Pools
Name	Opened	Description
Bambini Cove	2016	A children's activity pool featuring a sprinkler resembling the Leaning Tower of Pisa
Laguna Waterworks	1997	A children's water play structure with water features, five small water slides, and a tipping-bucket resembling the Roman Colosseum. Formerly Tipton Waterworks (1997–2016).
River Lazio	2016	A winding lazy river that surrounds Bambini Cove
Wave Oceano	2016	14,000 ft^{2} wave pool

== Former rides and attractions ==
=== Former roller coasters ===
Name	Opened	Closed	Manufacturer	Type	Notes
Little Dipper	1950s	1986	Allan Herschell Company	Steel children's roller coaster	
N/A	N/A	N/A	Arrow Development	Steel roller coaster	Previously operated at Libertyland. Never opened at DelGrosso's Park, was only kept in storage from 2006 to 2011. Moved in 2014 to Glorious Fantasyland where it now operates as Zimerman.
Zyklon	1987	2003	Pinfari	Steel roller coaster	Previously operated at Adventure Land as Super Italian Bobs (1969–1977), Legend City as Sidewinder (1978–1983), and Wild West World (1984–1986). Went on to operate at Blue Diamond Park as Blue Diamond Streak (2004–2007) and at Boardwalk Amusements as Sand Blaster (2013–2018).

=== Former rides ===
Name	Manufacturer	Type	Notes
Balloon Race	Zamperla	Balloon Race	
Bumper cars	Unknown	Bumper cars	One of two previous such rides
Bumper cars	Unknown	Bumper cars	One of two previous such rides
Calypso	Mack Rides	Calypso	
Casino	Chance Rides	Trabant	
Ferris Wheel	Unknown	Ferris wheel	
Flying Bobs	Unknown	Matterhorn	
Flying Scooters	Bisch Rocco	Flying Scooters	
Music Express	Unknown	Music Express	
Red Baron	Unknown	Red Baron	
Roto Whip	W.F. Mangels Company	The Whip	
Sea Dragon	Unknown	Swinging ship	
Sky Fighter	Allan Herschell Company	Children's spinning rocket ship ride	
Space Odyssey	Allan Herschell Company	Caterpillar	Previously operated at Lakemont Park. Operated at Delgrosso's Park from 1983 to 2011.
Tipton Speedway	Unknown	Go-karts	

=== Former attractions ===
- Miniature golf course
- Pony rides
- Roller rink
