= World's Finest Shows =

Amusement rides and travelling carnival in Ontario, Canada

- Company type: Privately held company
- Industry: Amusement - Midway
- Founded: 1986
- Headquarters: Nanticoke, Ontario
- Key people: Barry Jamieson; Pat Jamieson; Stacey Jamieson; Barry Ford
- Products: Amusement ride operation and traveling carnival management
- Number of employees: unit
- Divisions: Road Show and Home Show (Also known as Trillium and Talbot, Red and Blue, or Big and Small)
- Website: www.worldsfinestshows.com

World's Finest Shows is the largest traveling carnival in Ontario, Canada. They are best known for providing a majority of the rides at the Central Canada Exhibition before its cancellation. They generally provide rides and equipment for fairs between 2 and 5 days long. Some events last over a week long. Their typical season runs from late-April to mid-October.

== History ==
World's Finest Shows began in 1986 as a division of Conklin Shows, along with Supershows and the Bicycle Unit. In 1992, the division split off into its own company with Barry Jamieson becoming the president. The newly formed company bought out the assets and contracts of the Conklin eastern road show. The show remained based in Simcoe, Ontario with the barns at the fairgrounds used for storage and a workshop in the winter months. Needing a workshop for the company, they purchased a vacant workshop in Nanticoke, Ontario, which has been home to the show ever since. In 1997, World's Finest Shows won the contract for the Central Canada Exhibition in Ottawa (Commonly known as the Ottawa SuperEx).

When World's Finest Shows began, it had three units. It had the Trillium Unit, Talbot Unit, and the Supershow. The Supershow was a 10-ride rental service that lasted until mid-2002, when it was purchased by Dave and Jimmy Kong and turned into a full-time show. The Trillium Unit acts as the show's main unit, hosting the show's best equipment. The Talbot Unit is a smaller unit, that mostly consists of small, easy to set up rides for smaller events.

Throughout 2006 and 2007, World's Finest Shows sold many of their older rides to help pay off Canada's first Venetian Swing Carousel manufactured by Bertazzon, as well as to purchase three other rides: Fireball, Haunted Mansion, and Monkey Maze. The Venetian Swing Carousel, renamed "Wave Swinger," was first seen at the 2007 Central Canada Exhibition in Ottawa.

In August 2010, World's Finest Shows had qualified as a certified member of the OABA Circle of Excellence, the only midway provider in Canada to be awarded this designation.

After the cancellation of the Central Canada Exhibition in 2011, the company began to downsize to save money. In 2011, they sold their iconic Mack "Polar Express" for a smaller "Musik Express" model manufactured by Majestic Manufacturing. 2011 also saw the selling of their smaller ferris wheel, and Zamperla "Circus Train". They continued to downsize throughout the next few years, selling off their "Monkey Maze" funhouse, Chance "Zipper", their Bertazzon "Wave Swinger" Swing Carousel, and their old Sellner "Tilt-A-Whirl".

== Rides ==
^{Any ride that has been renamed since purchase has its former name(s) listed below its current name.}

=== Current ===
Total: 50

Name	Type	Manufacturer	Season Purchased
Alien Abduction	Major	Wisdom	2012
Beach Party^{Mardi Gras; Alpine House}	Fun House	Show Me	Unknown
Bikes^{Hampton Bikes}	Kiddie	Dalton	Unknown
Boats^{Hampton Boats}	Kiddie	Dalton	Unknown
Bulgy The Whales	Kiddie	Wisdom	2016
Bumble Bees	Kiddie	Sellner	2004
Cannonball	Major	A.R.M.	2005
Carousel	Kiddie	Allan Herschell	Unknown
Cars^{Hampton Combination}	Kiddie	Dalton	Unknown
Century Wheel	Ferris wheel	Chance	1991
Cobra Coaster	Roller Coaster / Kiddie	Wisdom	2004
Dizzy Dragons	Kiddie	Sellner	2001
Farm Tractors	Kiddie	Dalton	2014
Fireball	Major	Larson	2008
Flying Elephants	Kiddie	Kolmax Plus	2025
Frog Hopper	Kiddie	S&S	2015
Fun Slide	Slide	Frederiksen	2010
Groovy Bus	Kiddie	SBF/Visa	2014
Hang Glider	Major	Dartron	2002
Haunted Mansion	Dark Ride	Owen Trailers	2008
Jumpin' Jumbos	Kiddie	Sellner	2005
Kahuna	Major	Kolmax Plus	2026
Kite Flyer	Major	Zamperla	2016
Magic Carpet	Fun House	Owen Trailers	2012
Merry Go Round	Kiddie	San Antonio	2006
Merry Go Round 2	Kiddie	Chance	2021
Monkey Mayhem	Kiddie	Sellner	2007
Monster Truck	Kiddie	Wisdom	2012
Musik Express	Major	Majestic	2011
Nemo Ride	Kiddie	Eyerly	2011
Pharaoh's Fury	Major	Chance	1999
Puppies	Kiddie	SBF/Visa	2014
Raiders	Fun House	Wisdom	Unknown
Route 66	Kiddie	Majestic	2017
Scooter 1800	Bumper Cars	Majestic	Unknown
Scrambler	Major	Eli Bridge	2002
Scrambler 2	Major	Eli Bridge	2018
Silver Streak	Major	Wisdom	2016
Sky Slide^{Fun Slide}	Slide	Frederiksen	2007
Tea Cups	Kiddie	Kolmax Plus	2025
Tilt-A-Whirl	Major	Sellner	Unknown
Tornado	Major	Wisdom	2008
Trackless Train	Kiddie	Unknown	2019
Vertigo	Major	A.R.M.	2025
Viper Coaster	Roller Coaster / Kiddie	Wisdom	2025
Volkswagens^{Hampton Volkswagens}	Kiddie	Dalton	2006
Volkswagens Covered	Kiddie	Dalton	2014
Wacky Shack	Fun House	Funni Frite	2000
Wacky Worm	Roller Coaster / Kiddie	Fajume	2011
Zero Gravity^{Time Machine; Round Up}	Major	Hrubetz/Kilinski	Unknown
