= Joyland Amusement Park (Wichita, Kansas) =

Defunct amusement park in Wichita, Kansas

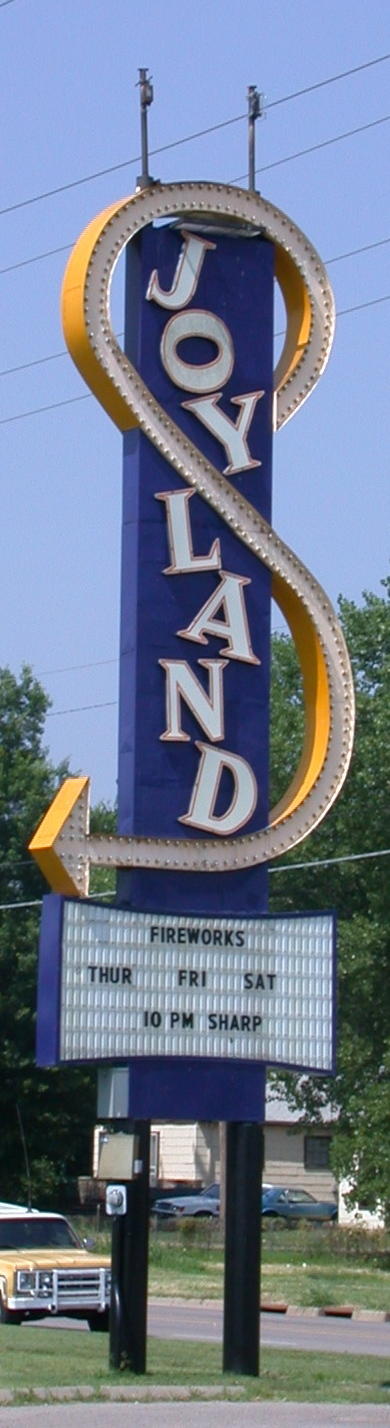
- Entrance in 2003
- Interactive map of Joyland Amusement Park
- Location: 2801 S Hillside St, Wichita, Kansas 67216
- Coordinates: 37.641223°N 97.303880°W
- Opened: 1949; 77 years ago
- Closed: 2006; 20 years ago
- Owner: Stanley & Margaret Nelson
- Slogan: "The Southwest's finest!"
- Operating season: Closed
- Area: 57 acres (23 ha)

Attractions
- Roller coasters: 1
- Water rides: 1

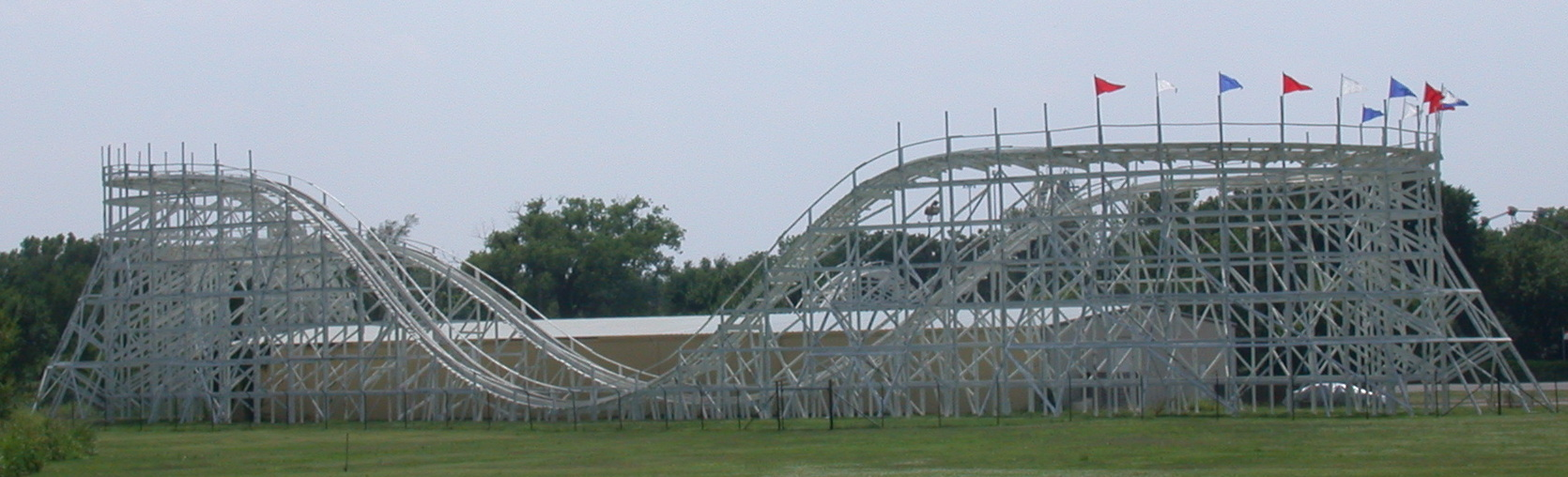
Roller Coaster in 2003

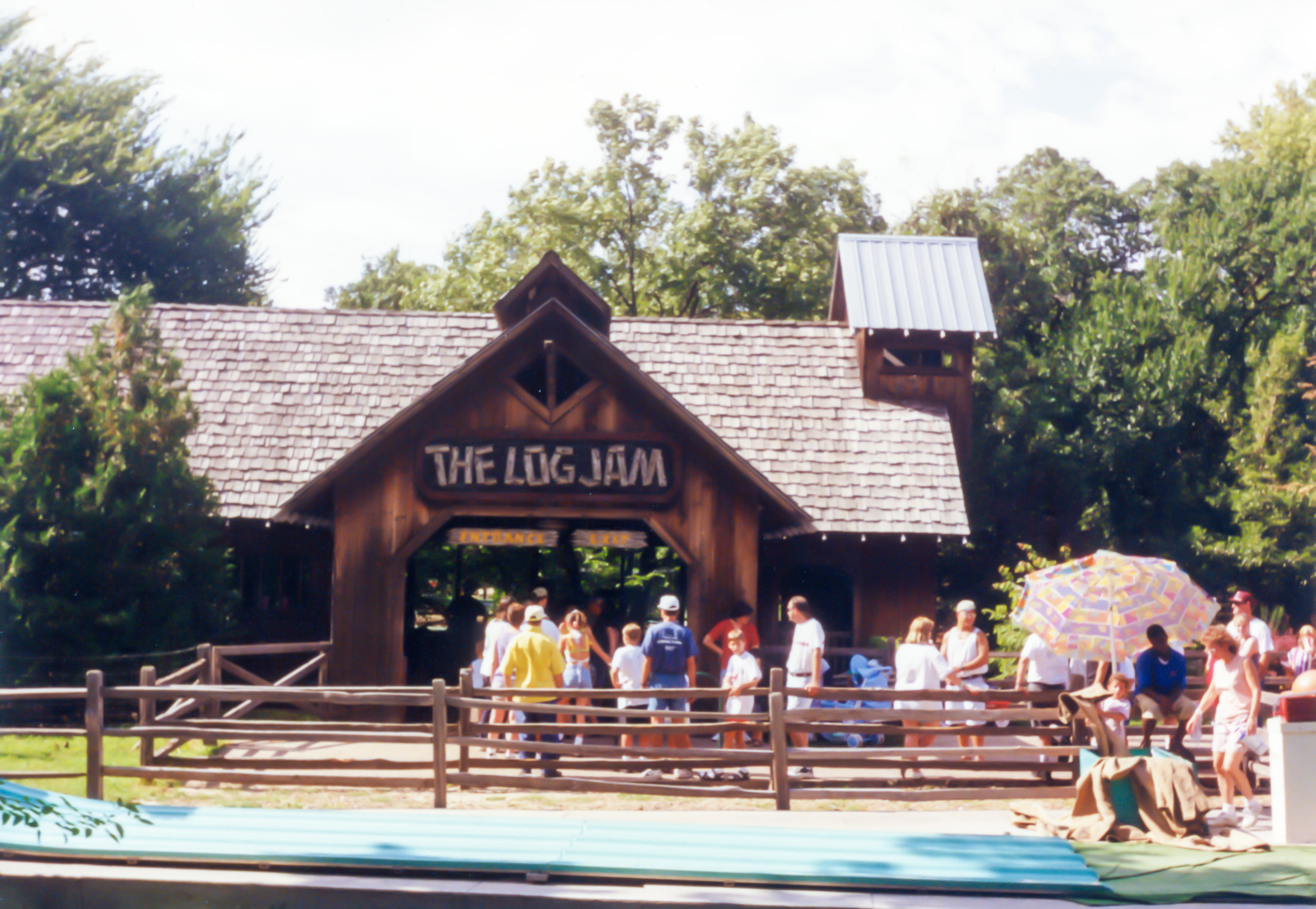
The Log Jam in 1997

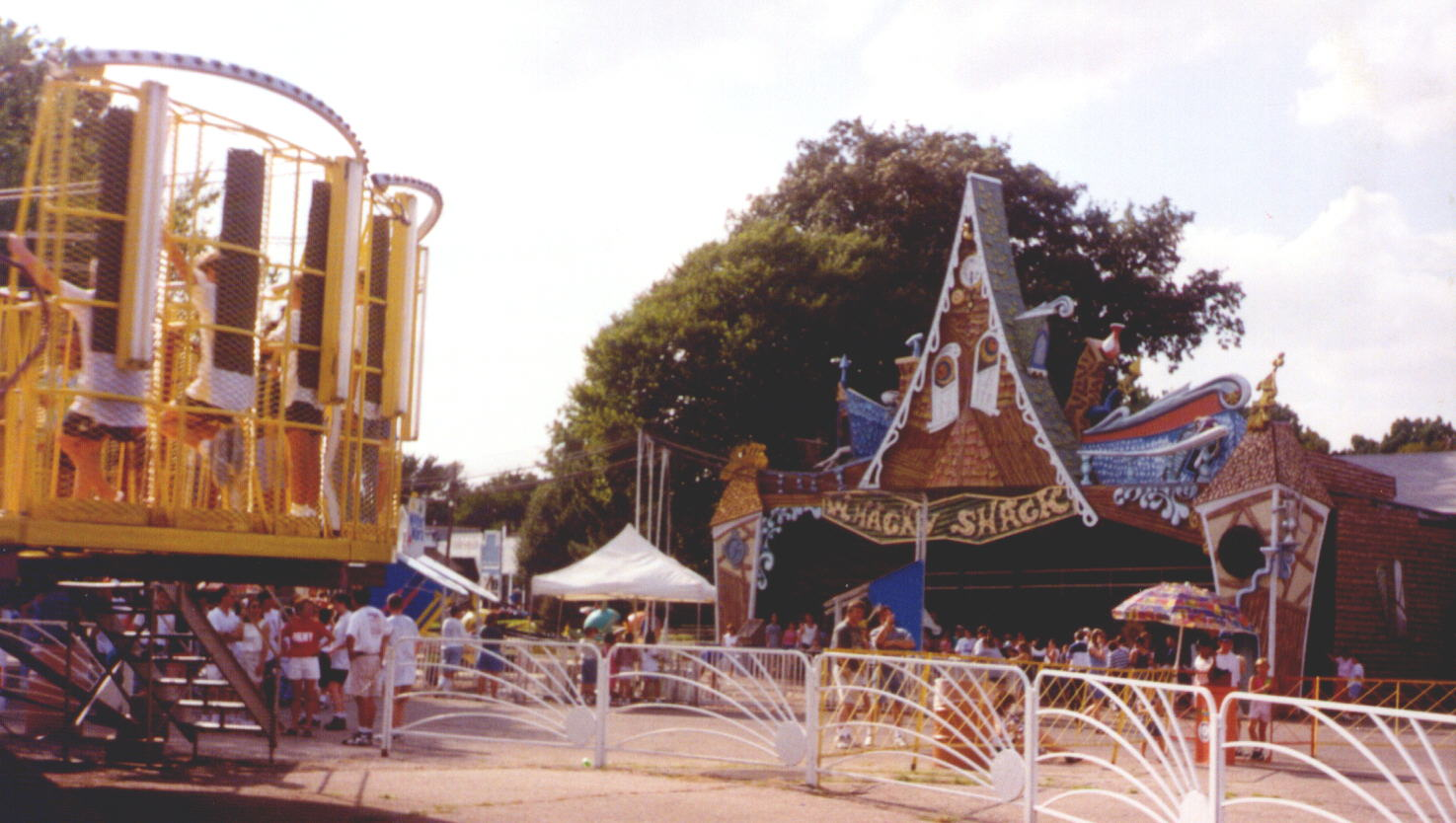
Tilt-A-Whirl and Whacky Shack in 1997

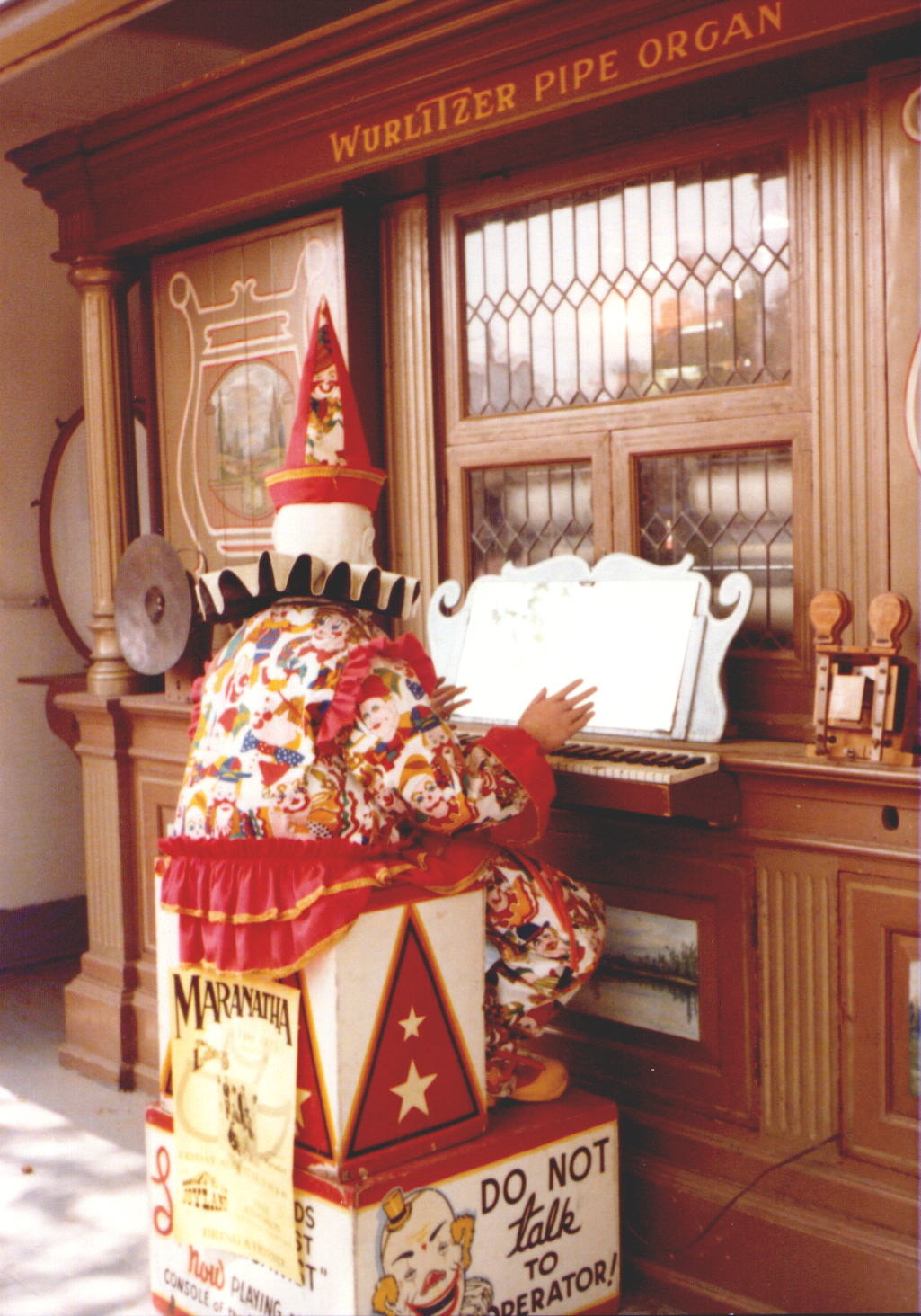
Wurlitzer organ with Louie the Clown in 1981

Joyland Amusement Park was an amusement park in Wichita, Kansas. It was in continuous operation from 1949 to 2004, standing vacant for two years before closing permanently in 2006. It was once the largest theme park in central Kansas and featured a wooden roller coaster, as well as several other rides.

== History ==
=== 20th century ===
Joyland was founded on June 12, 1949 by Lester Ottaway to house a miniature 12-inch (300 mm) gauge steam locomotive. It was originally located at 1515 East Central but soon moved to its final location at 2801 South Hillside. After Lester Ottaway’s death in the mid-1950s, his three sons, Herbert, Harold and Eddie continued running the park.

The Ottaway brothers retired from the amusement park business in the early 1970s and sold the park to Stanley and Margaret Nelson. Stanley died on July 13, 2010, at the age of 87. He and Margaret owned the park for over 30 years, and a large amount of its rides, including the Bill Tracy-designed Whacky Shack dark ride, were added under their management. This was Tracy's last project, as he died in August 1974, just a few months after its completion. The original miniature train retired with the Ottaways and was replaced with the first-ever C. P. Huntington miniature train built by Chance Rides.

=== 21st century ===
In April 2004, a 13-year-old girl fell 30 feet (9 m) from the Ferris wheel and was seriously injured. The U.S. Consumer Product Safety Commission investigated the accident.

Due to economic troubles and safety concerns, the park had to remain closed for the 2004 and 2005 seasons. Interest rose again in 2006 when a Seattle-based company, T-Rex Group, leased it to restore and open portions of it. Many renovations were made, and they were focused on aesthetics, rather than ride safety. The park's roller coaster received $10,000 worth of wood repairs and was renamed Nightmare. The Log Jam, the only water ride, had its pumps replaced and systems checked, as well as being repainted. The Restore Hope organization became involved, with hopes of regaining support to rebuild Joyland, with an emphasis on a community effort and involvement in the restoration process. They planned to restore it within the next few years and begin an expansion process to help it grow and become an integral part of the Wichita community.

After financial concerns during the 2006 season, the park closed permanently. Since its closing, it has been subjected to vandalism and looting. Park owner Margaret Nelson said, "We're sick. Our hearts are just sick. It's not easy, not easy."

In 2010, co-owner Stanley Nelson died. On August 4, 2012, a former maintenance building in the park caught fire. None of the rides were damaged and the fire was subdued in 30 minutes. Police suspected arson.

In May 2014, it was announced that Joyland owner Margaret Nelson Spear donated the park's carousel to Botanica, The Wichita Gardens, where It was fully restored. In June 2014, the iconic parking lot sign and marquee was sold to the Historic Preservation Alliance of Wichita and Sedgwick County. On February 19, 2015, the Wichita Police Department announced the return of Louie the Clown, the animatronic clown that had played the Wurlitzer organ at the park. It had gone missing over a decade prior and was found in the home of Damian Mayes, a former park employee.

The roller coaster was extensively damaged by a windstorm on the morning of April 3, 2015, including the destruction of large portions of elevated track. In April, the owner's son Roger Nelson, told reporters, "We are in the process of tearing it all down", referring to the roller coaster and the remaining buildings on the site. He had announced the previous week that the Preservation Alliance had purchased several of the park's marquee attractions, including Whacky Shack and a horse and buggy ride, and was negotiating to purchase the full-size train caboose as well. On July 23, 2015, the components of the roller coaster which remained standing were demolished.

On August 8, 2018, Whacky Shack, one of the few remaining intact structures in the park, was destroyed by a fire. In early November 2018, the 57 acres formerly comprising the site were purchased at auction by an anonymous buyer for $198,000.

On December 11, 2021, another fire was reported at the Joyland site.

== Rides ==
=== Summary ===
The park featured a go-cart track and 16 rides, including:

- Dodgems
- Ferris wheel
- Fun slide
- Miniature train
- Paratrooper
- Nightmare – A wooden roller coaster
- Round Up – A 1960s Frank Hrubetz & Company ride
- Scrambler – An Eli Bridge Company ride
- Skycoaster
- The Log Jam – Log flume
- Tilt-A-Whirl - A Sellner Manufacturing ride
- Whacky Shack – A Bill Tracy dark ride
- Zumur – A Chance Rides swing ride

=== Roller Coaster ===
The park's 1949 wooden roller coaster, originally known simply as Roller Coaster, was built by Philadelphia Toboggan Coasters and designed by Herbert Schmeck. It was one of then 33 coasters remaining of the 44 designated as Coaster Classics by American Coaster Enthusiasts. It had a 2,600 ft (790 m) track span, 80 ft (24 m) drop and 50 mph (80 km/h) top speed. It was the only remaining coaster in North America using vintage rolling stock with fixed lap bars. It was renamed Nightmare for a time in 2006 following refurbishments. It was extensively damaged in a windstorm in early April 2015 and permanently dismantled shortly thereafter.

=== Fairground organ ===
The park had a Mammoth Military Band Organ, also known as a Wurlitzer Style #160. The organ was installed in 1950. The park also added Louie, an animatronic clown who sat before the keyboard and "played" it.

=== Carousel ===
The park also featured an original Allan Herschell Company designed carousel, which was built in 1949, and still had all of the original horses. In May 2014, Joyland owner Margaret Nelson Spear donated it to Botanica, The Wichita Gardens with plans for a full restoration. After restoration, it was opened to the public on November 28, 2019.

== In media ==
Elements of the park have been captured on the cover of the Andy McKee album Joyland. A documentary about the park entitled Joyland: Reliving the Memories was released in 2018 on PBS.

A rock band called Scepter made a song and video called "Joyland".

== See also ==
- List of defunct amusement parks
  - Wild West World
  - Wonderland Park
