= Libertyland =

Former amusement park in Memphis, Tennessee

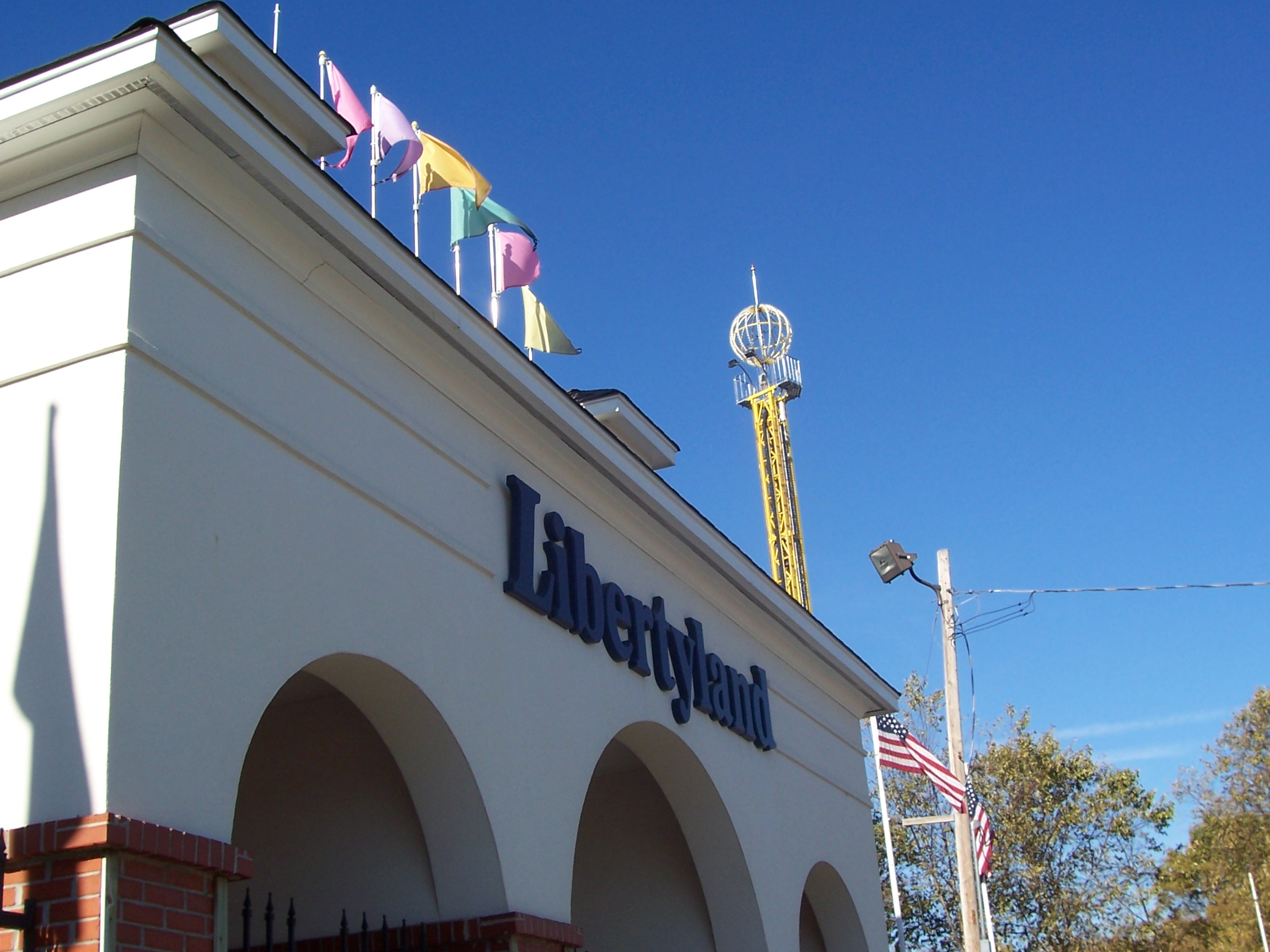
- Main entrance and Rebellion drop tower in 2005
- Interactive map of Libertyland
- Location: Memphis, Tennessee
- Coordinates: 35.119°N 89.982°W
- Status: Defunct
- Opened: July 4, 1976
- Closed: October 29, 2005
- Operating season: April to September
- Attendance: 372,807 (2004)
- Area: 25 acres (10 ha)

Libertyland was an amusement park located in Memphis, Tennessee. Owned by the Mid-South Fair, the park opened on July 4, 1976, and closed on October 29, 2005 due to financial struggles. In 2022, a youth sports complex was built on the site of the amusement park. The park was structured as a nonprofit 501(c)4 organization.

== History ==
In May 1971, directors of the Mid-South Fair proposed the idea of an amusement park at the fairgrounds to local officials. Their proposal included themed areas to be located north of the park, and a monorail system for parking lot circulation. Their hope was to maximize the use of the land, utilizing existing attractions such as the wooden coaster Pippin, renamed Zippin Pippin with the opening of Libertyland, and the Memphis Grand Carousel.

Libertyland opened as an amusement park on the Mid-South fairgrounds on July 4, 1976. Several rides were added alongside the pre-existing rides that had operated there as part of the fair. Zippin Pippin became popular after Elvis Presley proclaimed it to be his favorite roller coaster. The park continued to add attractions, such as a steel coaster called Revolution. In the late 1990s, it added a Top Spin called Tidal Wave. In April 2002, Tidal Wave was replaced by the drop tower Rebellion. Around this time, crowds began to diminish.

The park's last day of operations was October 29, 2005. In early November, a meeting was called before the Mid-South Fair board of committee to close the park. The vote passed, and the announcement was made public. Their reasonings included lack of profit, a steady decline of attendance, and they wanted to extend the midway for the annual Mid-South Fair, which operated adjacent to the park's site for 10 days in October.

The decision to close Libertyland led to the formation of Save Libertyland!, a group formed to fight for the reopening the park, citing that the park created hundreds of jobs for Memphis-area teens and was an affordable place for families to spend time. Save Libertyland! filed a complaint in court to block Mid-South Fair from auctioning off the rides and equipment, arguing that they were owned by the city of Memphis. The city ended up claiming ownership of Zippin Pippin and Memphis Grand Carousel, leaving the other rides to Mid-South Fair.

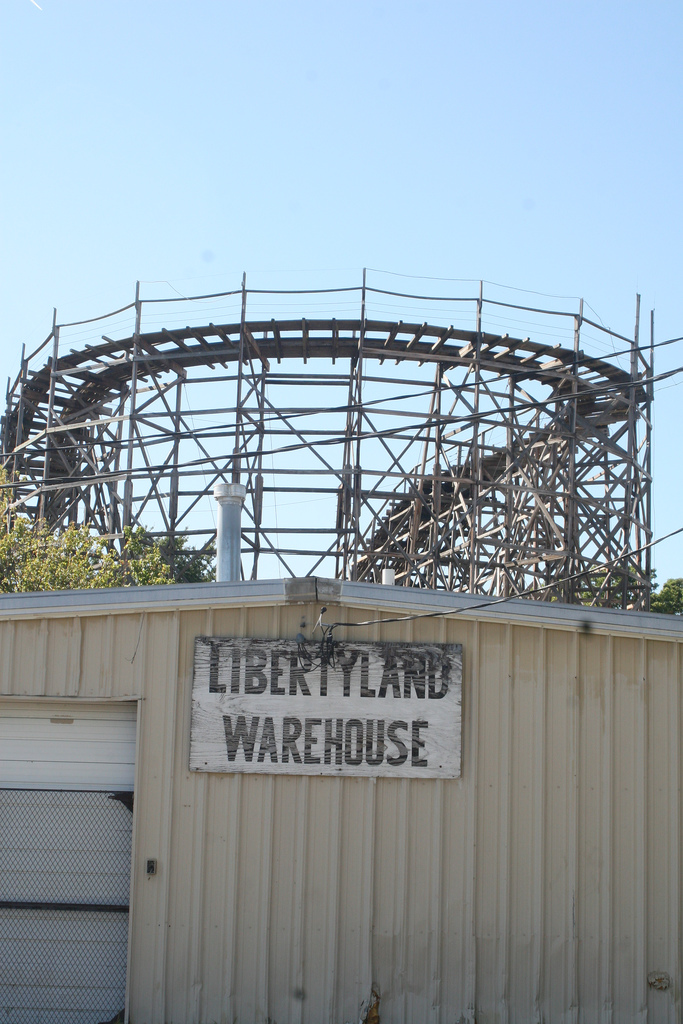
Zippin Pippin in 2008

An auction was held on June 21, 2006. Most of the rides were sold, including Zippin Pippin, which was bought by the city of Green Bay, Wisconsin and rebuilt at their Bay Beach Amusement Park in 2011. Revolution was bought by DelGrosso's Park but not reassembled. Instead, it was eventually reassembled at Glorious Fantasyland in the Philippines, where it returned to operation in 2014. Rebellion was sold to Ghost Town Village and reopened in 2007.

In December 2006, Joyland Inc. sent the city a letter of intent for developing a new amusement park on the Libertyland site. The deal was to be completed on a three-year lease plan, and Joyland hoped to receive Memphis Grand Carousel and Zippin Pippin to be included in the park. However, upon viewing the site, Joyland Inc. pulled out of the deal due to extensive damage to infrastructure, including wiring and plumbing.

=== Post-closure ===
Memphis Grand Carousel was leased and restored by the Children's Museum of Memphis and began operating in a new pavilion in November 2017.

In 2022, the Memphis Sports and Events Center was built on the site of the amusement park. The 227,000 square feet (21,100 m^{2}) sports complex hosts tournaments and other events, and includes two adjacent soccer fields.

== Attractions ==
- Bumper boats
- Car-Go-Round
- Casey's Cannonball train ride
- Dragon Wagon (Steel children's roller coaster by Wisdom Rides. Closed with the park on October 29, 2005.)
- Fun Run
- Memphis Grand Carousel (Opened by Memphis Commission in 1923. Restored and relocated to the Children's Museum of Memphis in 2017.)
- Kamikaze (by Fabbri Group)
- Little Dipper (Steel children's roller coaster by Allan Herschell Company. Operated from the 1970s to 1984.)
- Miniature bumper boats
- Old Hickory log flume
- Paratrooper
- Park's Peak
- Pirate Ship
- Rebellion drop tower (Opened in 2002 and closed with the park on October 29, 2005. Relocated to Ghost Town Village in 2007.)
- Red Baron
- Revolution (Steel roller coaster by Arrow Development. Opened in 1979 and closed with the park on October 29, 2005. Relocated to DelGrosso's Park from 2006 to 2011 and again to Glorious Fantasyland where it reopened in 2014 as Zimerman.)
- Screamer
- Sea Dragon swinging ship
- Surf City water slide
- Tennessee Tilt Tilt-A-Whirl
- Thriller
- Turnpike antique cars
- Twain's Twister Scrambler (by Eli Bridge Company)
- Umbrella Ride
- Wipeout (by Chance Rides)
- Zippin Pippin (Wooden roller coaster. Opened in 1923 and closed with the park on October 29, 2005. Relocated to Bay Beach Amusement Park in 2011.)
