= Bertazzon =

Italian amusement ride manufacturer

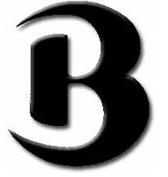
- Company type: Private
- Industry: Manufacturing
- Founded: Italy (1963; 63 years ago)
- Founder: Luigi, Ferruccio and Marcello Bertazzon
- Headquarters: Sernaglia della Battaglia, Italy
- Area served: Worldwide
- Products: Amusement rides
- Number of employees: 60 (as at 2012)
- Divisions: Bertazzon 3B s.r.l. Bertazzon America
- Website: Bertazzon 3B s.r.l. Bertazzon America LLC

Bertazzon is an amusement ride manufacturing company based in Sernaglia della Battaglia, Italy. The company produces a variety of flat rides including bumper cars, carousels, swing rides, Matterhorns, Musik Expresses and dark ride systems.

== History ==
In 1951, three brothers began renovating existing amusement rides: Luigi, Ferruccio and Marcello Bertazzon. Bertazzon 3B was founded in 1963 when the company began manufacturing their own rides. The company later spawned a division based in the United States, Bertazzon America. As of 2009, the company is run by the founders' descendants Michele, Alex and Patrizia Bertazzon. As of 2012, Bertazzon employs approximately 60 people, and manages a 12,000-square-metre (130,000 sq ft) manufacturing facility in Italy.

== Products ==
- Bumper Cars – both full size and children's versions
- Carousels
- Swing Carousels
- Matterhorns
- Musik Expresses
- Dark Ride Systems

== Installations ==
Name	Park	Model	Opened	Status
Bumper Beach	Dreamworld	Bumper Cars	1983	Closed in 2012
Buffalo Bumper Cars	Djurs Sommerland	Bumper Cars	2012	Operating
Pier Pileup	Galveston Island Historic Pleasure Pier	Bumper Cars	2012	Operating
Bumper Cars	Ghost Town in the Sky	Bumper Cars		Closed
Mini Bumper Cars	Gröna Lund	Bumper Cars	2003	Operating
Big Easy Bumpers	Thorpe Park	Bumper Cars	2014	Operating
Miniautoscooter	Hansa Park	Bumper Cars		Operating
Space Scooter	Hansa Park	Bumper Cars		Operating
Crazy Cars	Nickelodeon Universe	Bumper Cars	1992	Operating
Space Bump	Galaxyland	Bumper Cars	1985	Operating
Bump-A-Round	Splash Adventure	Bumper Cars	1998	Closed in 2011
Fender Bender	Splash Adventure	Bumper Cars	1998	Closed in 2011
	Keansburg Amusement Park	Bumper Cars	2013	Operating
	Steel Pier	Bumper Cars	2013	Operating
Carousel	Camelot	Venetian Carousel	2012	Operating
Gallopers Carousel	Alton Towers Resort	Carousel		Operating
Hanse-Karussell	Hansa Park	Carousel		Operating
Nostalgic Carousel	Heide Park	Carousel	1997	Operating
	Palisades Center	Carousel	2009	Operating
Carosello	Rainbow Magicland	Carousel	2011	Operating
Candy Carousel	Särkänniemi	Carousel	1993	Operating
Bluegrass Breeze	Beech Bend Park	Swing Carousel	2015	Operating
	Dollywood	Swing Carousel		
Just A Swingin'	Hard Rock Park	Swing Carousel	2008	Closed in 2009
Sea Swings	Santa Cruz Beach Boardwalk	Swing Carousel	2009	Operating
	Silver Dollar City	Swing Carousel		
	World's Finest Shows	Swing Carousel		
Water Circus	Steel Pier	Swing Carousel	2013	Operating
Avalanche	Dreamworld	Matterhorn	1983	Closed in 2012
Safari Stampede	Rides At Adventure Cove	Matterhorn	2008	
Musik Express	Casino Pier	Musik Express		Closed in 2012
	Coney Island	Musik Express		
Rock & Roll	Galveston Island Historic Pleasure Pier	Musik Express	2012	Operating
Musik Express	Morey's Piers	Musik Express		
Musik Express	Seabreeze Amusement Park	Musik Express	2008	Operating
Hurricane	Splash Adventure	Musik Express	1998	2011
	Wild West World	Musik Express	2007	Closed in 2007
Justice League: Alien Invasion 3D	Warner Bros. Movie World	Dark Ride System	2012	Operating
Lost Kingdom Adventure	Legoland California	Dark Ride System	2008	Operating
Lost Kingdom Adventure	Legoland Florida	Dark Ride System	2011	Operating
Lost Kingdom Adventure	Legoland Malaysia	Dark Ride System	2012	Operating
Lost Kingdom Adventure	Legoland Windsor	Dark Ride System	2009	Operating
Carousel	Palm Beach International Equestrian Center	Carousel	2013	Only Venetian Carousel in Palm Beach ever built
Carousel	Disney Springs	Carousel	1975	First type to ship in the USA
Carousel	Eagle Ridge Mall	Carousel	1996	First Bertazzon to ship in Central Florida to operate in a mall and the only type to not use a finial because the ceiling is too small
Carousel	Old Town	Carousel	1986	First Bertazzon to be in use at a standing still carnival
Carousel	Universal CityWalk Florida	Carousel	See site	Clone to Disney Springs version.
Carousel	Hersheypark	Venetian Carousel	2019	Only Venetian Carousel in Hershey Pennsylvania
The Chessington Adventure Tree	Chessington World of Adventures	Carousel	2017	Operating
Venetian Carousel	Canobie Lake Park	Venetian Carousel	2019	Operating

== Awards ==
In 2006, Bertazzon was awarded a Golden Pony Award at the Technofolies trade show. Luigi Bertazzon accepted the award on behalf of the company.

== See also ==
- Category:Amusement rides manufactured by Bertazzon Rides
