= Ackerman Island =

Former island in Kansas, U.S.

- Interactive map of Ackerman Island

Geography
- Location: Arkansas River
- Coordinates: 37°41′14″N 97°20′43″W

Administration
- United States
- State: Kansas
- City: Wichita

Ackerman Island was a sandbar island located in the Arkansas River in downtown Wichita, Kansas, United States. It was located on the north side of the Douglas Street Bridge.

== History ==
The sandbar started to form in the 1870s, supposedly due to a drop in the water level of the Arkansas River.

Joseph Ackerman, a local businessman, acquired the island in 1890. In 1905, he sold the island, then the Wonderland Park (aka Wonderland Amusement Park) was built and remained open until 1918.

In 1912, the Island Park baseball stadium was built on the island. Baseball was played at that stadium from 1912 until it was torn down in 1933.

In 1925, at this stadium, a Ku Klux Klan team played baseball against a Negro league baseball team named the Wichita Monrovians. The Monrovians won 10–8. Proceeds were donated to charity.

By the early 1930s, flooding concerns led the Works Progress Administration to organise the removal of the sandbar. The east side of the island was used to fill the west channel of the river and the east channel was widened and became the current river. The island became part of the current west bank of the Arkansas River.

In 1934, a new baseball stadium, Lawrence Stadium, was built a few blocks south to replace the one formerly on the island.

== See also ==
- National Baseball Congress
- List of defunct amusement parks
  - Joyland Amusement Park
  - Wild West World
