= Zimerman (roller coaster) =

Roller coaster at Glorious Fantasyland

Glorious Fantasyland
- Coordinates: 8.646271°N 123.418467°E
- Status: Operating
- Opening date: February 14, 2014

Libertyland
- Name: Revolution
- Coordinates: 35.116655°N 89.982351°W
- Status: Removed
- Opening date: 1979
- Closing date: October 25, 2005
- Revolution at Libertyland at RCDB

General statistics
- Type: Steel
- Manufacturer: Arrow Development
- Model: Looping & Corkscrew
- Lift/launch system: Chain lift
- Height: 70.0 ft (21.3 m)
- Drop: 65.0 ft (19.8 m)
- Length: 1,565.0 ft (477.0 m)
- Speed: 55.0 mph (88.5 km/h)
- Inversions: 3
- Duration: 1:20
- Trains: Single train with 7 cars. Riders are arranged 2 across in 2 rows for a total of 28 riders per train.
- Zimerman at RCDB

Zimerman is a steel roller coaster located at Glorious Fantasyland in Dapitan City, Philippines. The ride, manufactured by Arrow Development, first opened as Revolution at Libertyland in Memphis, Tennessee in 1979. After the 2005 closure of Libertyland, the ride was relocated to DelGrosso's Park, where it sat in storage until 2013. It was then moved to Glorious Fantasyland, where it was rebuilt for the 2014 season. The ride was officially announced on 30 December 2011, and opened on 14 February 2014.
