= Botanica, The Wichita Gardens =

Botanical gardens in Wichita, Kansas, United States

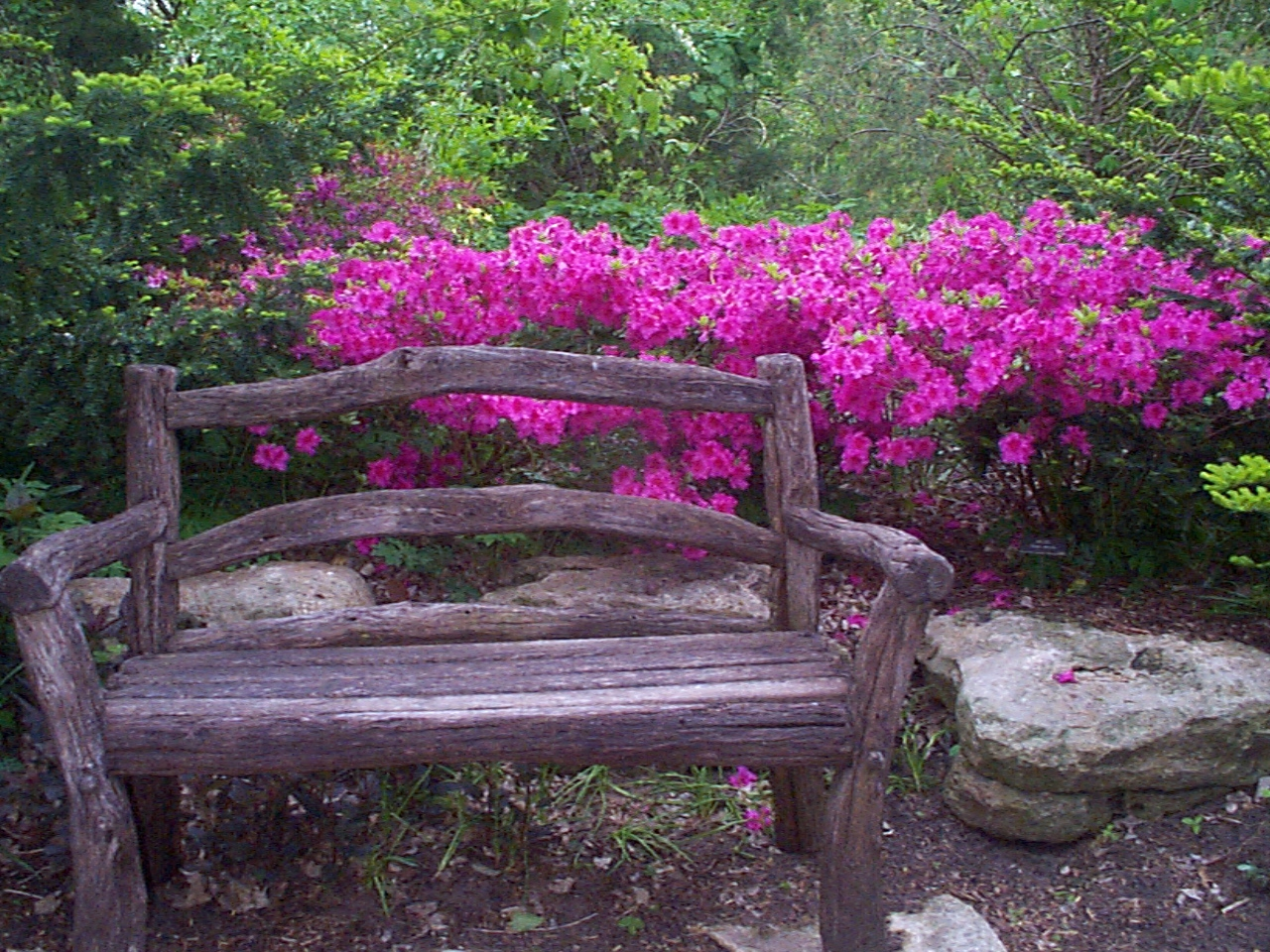
- Azaleas at Botanica in 2007
- Interactive map of Botanica, The Wichita Gardens
- Type: Botanical gardens
- Location: 701 North Amidon St, Wichita, KS 67203 USA
- Coordinates: 37°41′46″N 97°21′50″W
- Area: 17.6 acres (71,000 m^{2})
- Created: 1987
- Website: Official website

Botanica, The Wichita Gardens was opened in 1987 as a collaboration between the Wichita Area Garden Council and the City of Wichita. Originally it had four gardens and now encompasses 17.6 acres (7.12 hectares) of botanical gardens located at 701 North Amidon, Wichita, Kansas, USA. They are city-owned as part of the Wichita Park System and are operated by Botanica, Inc. a non-profit 501(c)3.

The gardens include: an aquatic collection; butterfly garden and 2,880 square foot (270 m^{2}) butterfly house featuring pansy exhibits during the winter; greenhouse for tropical plants; juniper collection with more than 30 types of junipers; peony collection of 104 cultivars; pinetum; rock garden with sedum and sempervivum; rose garden with more than 350 rose plants; sensory garden; Shakespearean garden; woodlands with azaleas, dogwoods, elm, hackberry, honey locust, mulberry, osage orange, and redbuds; and Xeriscape demonstration garden.

Botanica opened the Downing Children's Garden in July 2011 and features several themed areas including the monster woods, salamander stream, granddaddy's musical maze, a rainbow and sunflower fountain and plaza.

A new events center opened in 2014 which will hold 299 people in chairs or 240 at tables. The inspiration for it came from the wood-and-glass Thorncrown Chapel in Eureka Springs, Arkansas. “It’s not a church but it can give that feeling, particularly when you have something spiritual like a wedding. It has that ambience.” Botanica hosts more than 200 weddings a year, bringing in about 27 percent of its revenue, but it wasn't built with such rentals in mind.

In May 2014, it was announced the 1949 Allan Herschell Company carousel from the former Joyland Amusement Park was donated to the Botanica and would be placed in the Downing Children's Garden.

== See also ==
- List of botanical gardens in the United States
