= Matterhorn (ride) =

Type of amusement ride

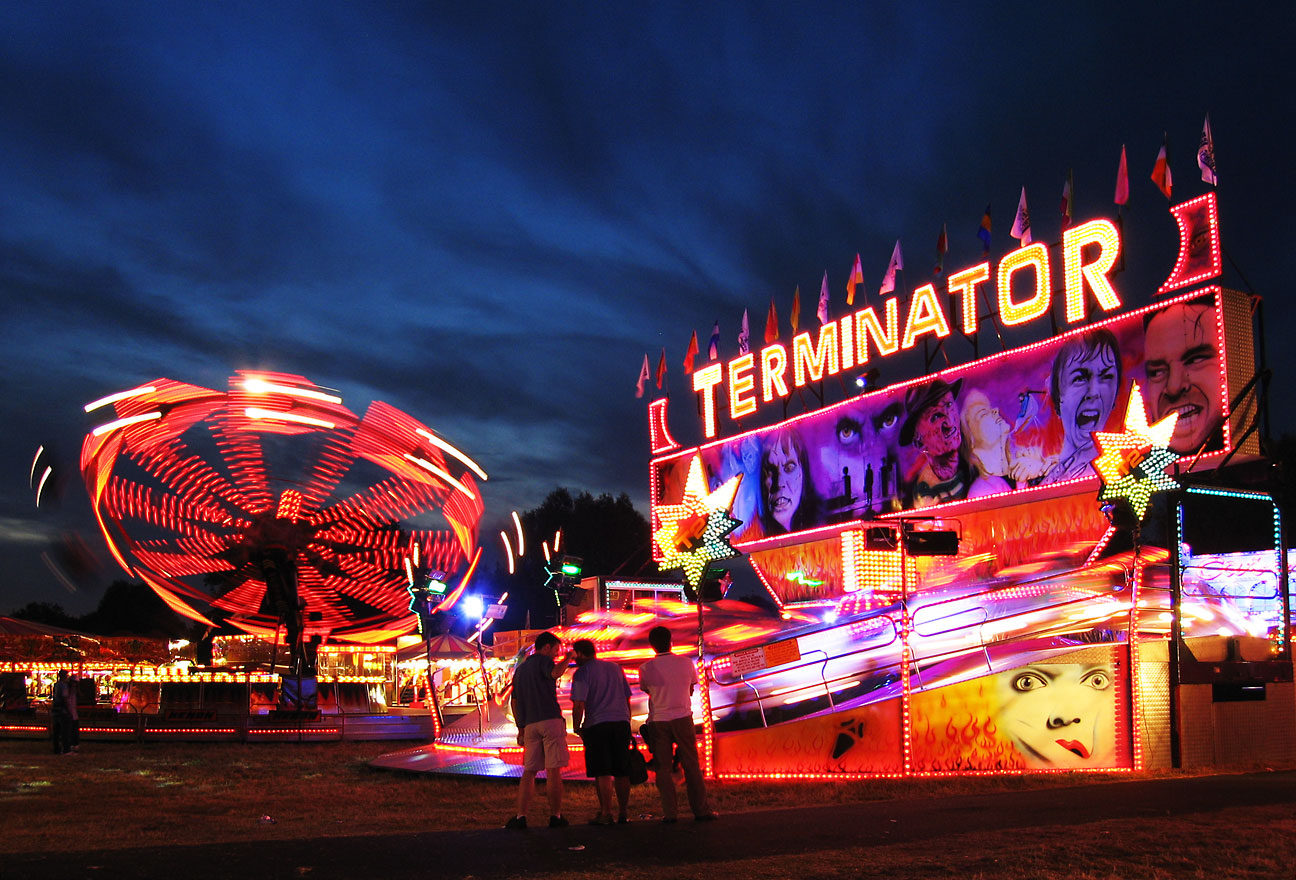
A Swailes Bailey-operated Matterhorn called Terminator, seen at the Cambridge Midsummer Fair in 2005

A Matterhorn (also known as a Flying Bobs, Musik Express, Music Express, or Terminator) is a type of amusement ride which consists of a number of cars attached to axles that swing inwards and outwards. These axles are attached to a center body which can spin forwards and backwards. The course of the ride is a circular path with hills and valleys, which cause a pronounced swinging motion in the cars. The faster the ride spins, the more dramatic the swinging motion becomes. Most carnivals and parks require riders to be at least 42 inches (1.1 m) or taller.

The common analog of the Matterhorn is the Music Express (also known as Musik Express or Superbob). The main difference between the two rides is the Music Express' use of tracked cars, rather than swinging axles.

Manufacturers of Matterhorn rides include Bertazzon, Chance Morgan, Mack Rides, and Reverchon Industries.
