= R. E. Chambers Company =

Former American amusement ride manufacturer

The Ralph E. Chambers Engineering Company (often shortened to R. E. Chambers Company) was an amusement ride manufacturing firm that took over the facilities of the bankrupt Traver Engineering Company in Beaver Falls, Pennsylvania from 1933 into 1962. Traver Engineering Company founder Harry Traver continued to work for the R. E. Chambers Company. The company's founder, Ralph E. Chambers, was previously the Traver Engineering Company's chief engineer.

R. E. Chambers Company designed and built many of the rides for the New York World's Fair of 1939 and 1940, with Traver continuing to design and engineer several of the company's products, including the Speed King Auto Racer.

R. E. Chambers Company came to an end when the company experienced a devastating plant fire in 1968. Some of the more well-known ride models the company was involved with the creation of include Caterpillars, small tracked dark rides (often named "Laff in the Dark"), and Tumble Bugs.
