= Memphis Grand Carousel =

Carousel in Memphis, Tennessee

- Libertyland Grand Carousel
- Formerly listed on the U.S. National Register of Historic Places
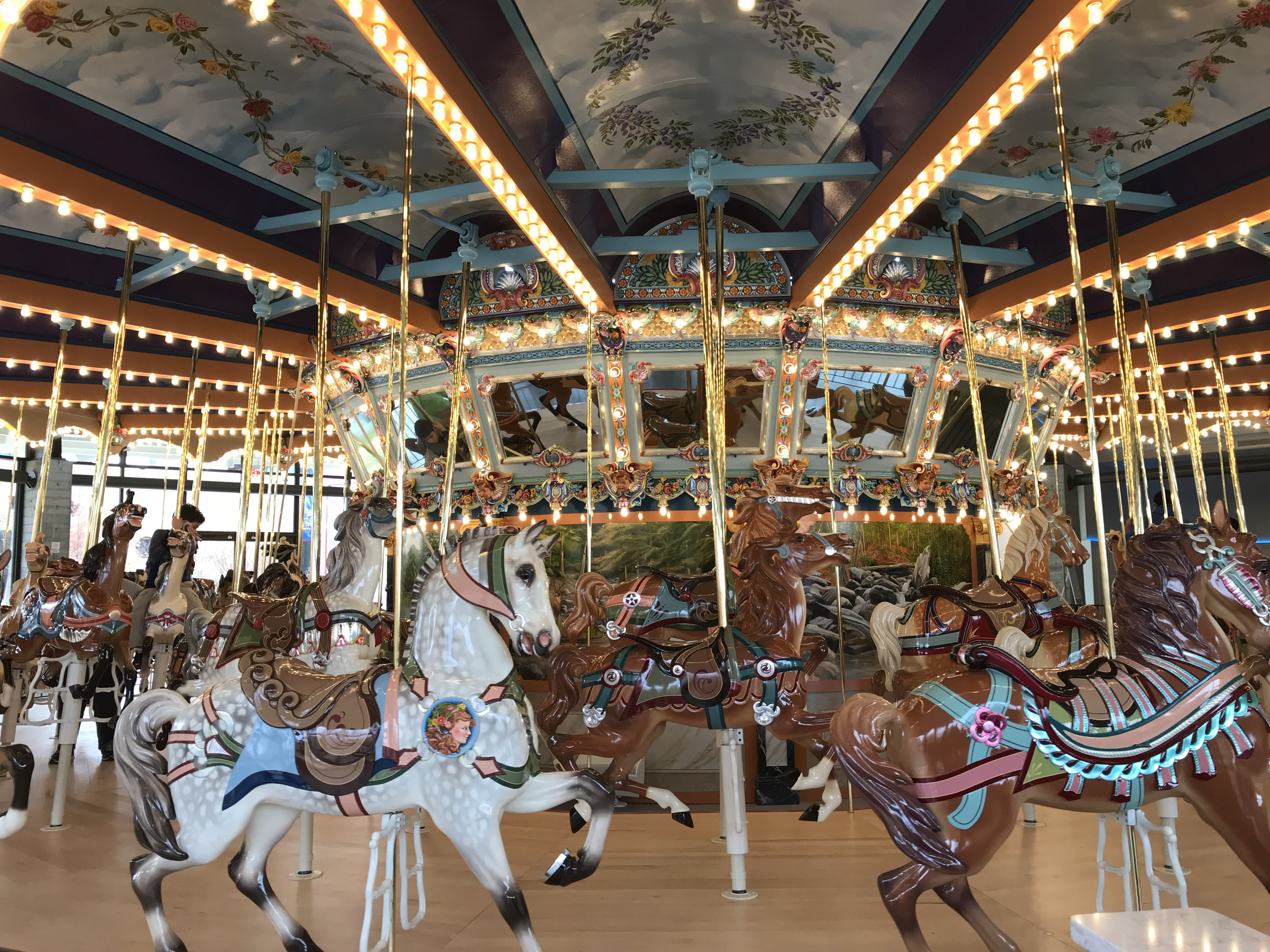
- The Memphis Grand Carousel in the Children's Museum of Memphis in 2017
- Location: Memphis, Tennessee
- Coordinates: 35.1189°N 89.9836°W
- Built: 1909; 117 years ago
- Architect: Dentzel Carousel Company
- NRHP reference No.: 80003865

Significant dates
- Added to NRHP: July 3, 1980
- Removed from NRHP: November 18, 2009

The Memphis Grand Carousel, is a carousel located in Memphis, Tennessee. It was built in 1909 by the Dentzel Carousel Company with 48 wood-carved horse figures. It was purchased by the Memphis Park Commission in 1923. The carousel then operated at the site of the Mid-South Fair, and later the Libertyland amusement park. The Grand Carousel was added to the National Register of Historic Places in 1980, but was delisted in 2009. After Libertyland closed in the fall of 2005, it remained abandoned with the park until 2009, when it was dismantled and placed into storage. In 2014, the Children's Museum of Memphis was given a 25-year lease on the carousel by the City of Memphis, the carousel's owner. The carousel has been restored and since December 2017, currently operates in a new facility on the museum's campus.

== See also ==
- Amusement rides on the National Register of Historic Places
- National Register of Historic Places listings in Shelby County, Tennessee
