= Round Up (ride) =

Amusement ride

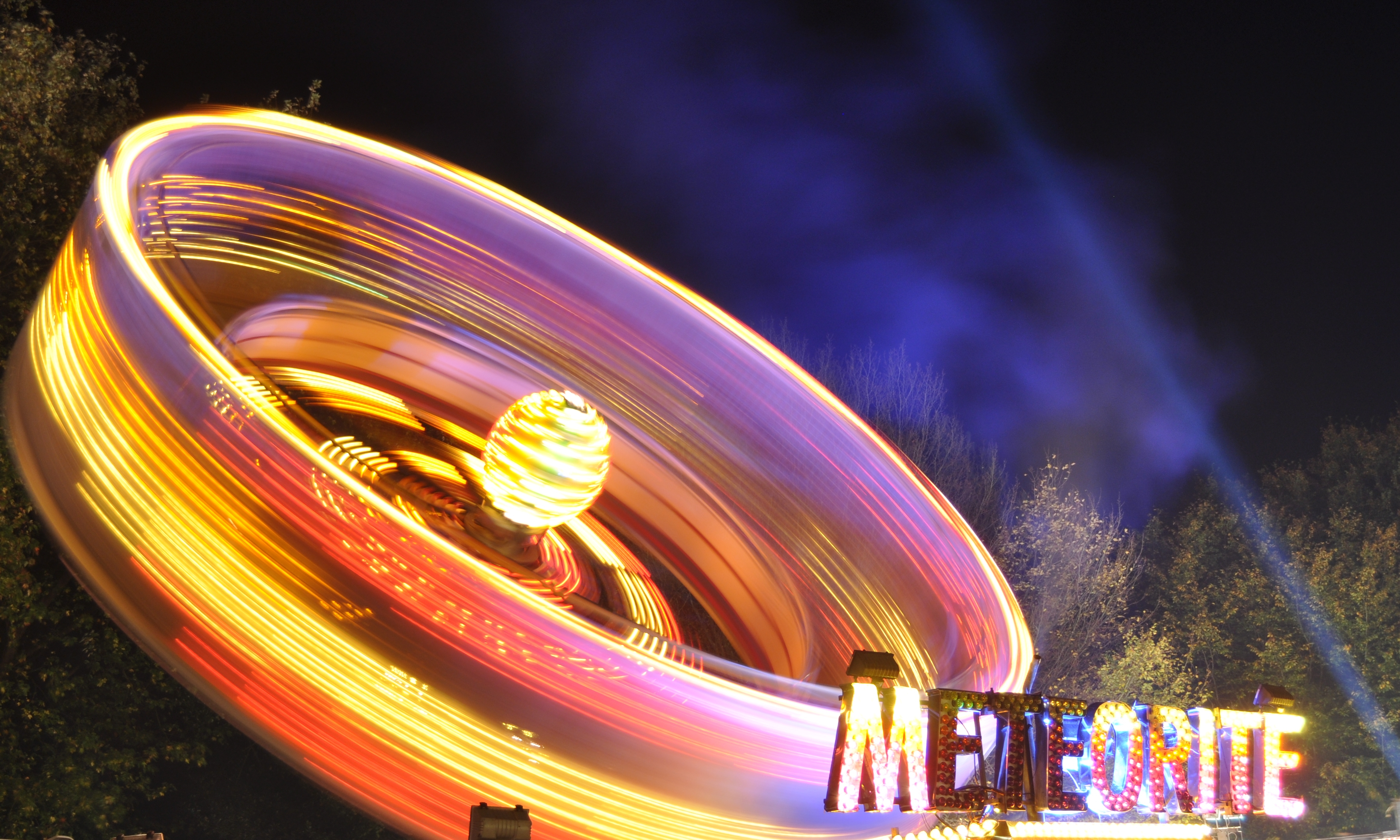
The Meteorite in action at Worden Park

Round Up is an amusement ride consisting of a circular horizontal platform with a vertical cage-like wall around the edge. The platform is attached to a motor on a hydraulic arm. The ride starts out by spinning until the centrifugal force is enough to push riders against the wall. Then the arm raises the horizontal platform to a vertical position in which riders, instead of spinning horizontally, are now spinning almost vertically.

The ride spins for a predetermined cycle until an automatic timer releases the hydraulic fluid from the arm, causing the platform to return to its horizontal position. The operator may be required to manually control the spin of the ride so that its exit aligns correctly with the exit gate. Most require the rider to be at least 42 inches tall.

In the United Kingdom, this ride is commonly known as the Meteor or Meteorite. The first such ride to arrive in that same country was with Rose Brothers in the 1950s and it came from Germany.

Although Hrubetz examples exist in the United Kingdom, other common makers include Cadoxton and Sam Ward.

There are 70 Round Ups in the United States, 40 in the United Kingdom and 20 in Australia, and exist both as permanent attractions for amusement parks and as traveling attractions for fair and carnivals.

== New models ==
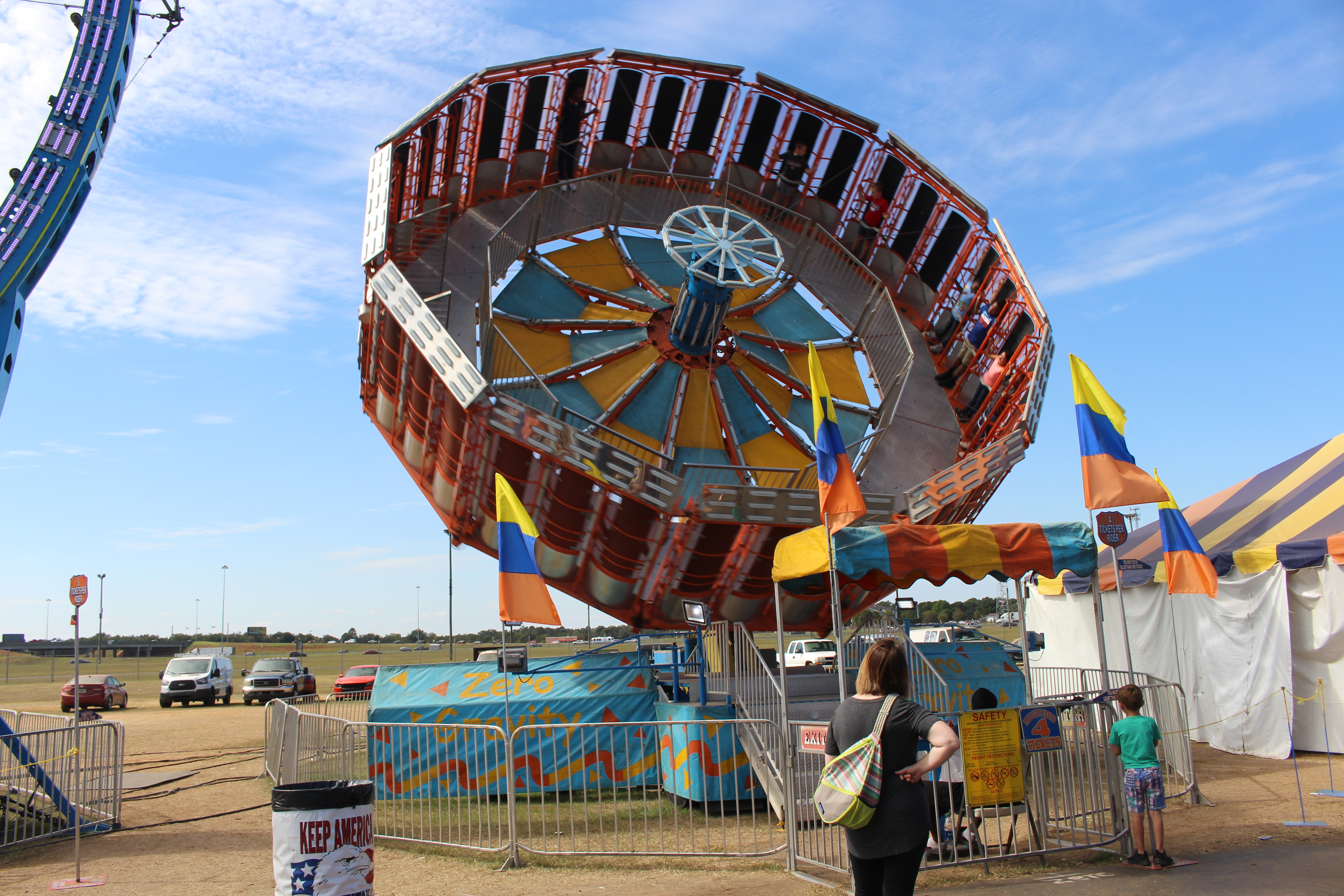
Zero Gravity at the Georgia State Fair

The new portable model, made by Dartron, is known as Zero Gravity. The lighting and appearance has changed and the ride has gone from tire rim drive to direct center gear drive, but its operation remains the same. The title is ironic because the ride does the opposite of creating the sense of zero gravity, as it only gives off the illusion that there is an increase in gravity.

Another version, also made by Dartron, exists called "Zendar", where the platform tilts on the end of the arm.

== Locations ==
Name	Location	Opened	Notes	Ref(s)
Electric Rainbow	Stricker's Grove		Located in Ross, Ohio, outside of Cincinnati	
The Black Hole	Happy H Attractions		Located in Springdale and serving festival locations citywide	
Bulls Eye	Camden Park		Located at 1 mile past the Wayne County border in West Virginia	
Teen Titans Turbo Spin	Six Flags Magic Mountain		First known as Electric Rainbow between 1974 and 1986, then Turbo between 1987 and 1993, then Gordon Gearworks between 1994 and 1998 Grinder Gearworks between 1998 and 2011 and then Wonder Woman: Lasso of Truth between 2011 and 2019	
Riddle Me This	Six Flags America			
Zero Gravity	Canobie Lake Park		Replaced Round Up in the mid-2008 season.	
Bamboozler	Worlds of Fun	1977		
The Revolution	Holiday World & Splashin' Safari			
Round Up	Tweetsie Railroad			
Round Up	Lakeside Amusement Park			
Round-Up	Enchanted Forest Water Safari	1978		
Super Spiral	DelGrosso's Amusement Park			
Round Up	Mark Lake Enterprises			
Super Round Up	Idlewild Park	1986		
Zero Gravity	Oaks Amusement Park			
Super Round Up	Silverwood Theme Park			
Super Round Up	Parque de la Ciudad			
Round Up	Knoebels Amusement Resort			
Cyclone	Santa Cruz Beach Boardwalk			
The Genie	Lake Winnepesaukah			
Nemesis	Ulten Castle			
Zero Gravity	Beauce Carnival			
Zero Gravity	Deggeller Attractions			
Zero Gravity	Evans Midland Empire Shows, Inc.			
Zero Gravity	Pacific National Exhibition			
Zero Gravity	The Mighty Bluegrass Shows			
Zero Gravity	West Coast Amusements			
Zero Gravity	Windy City Amusements			
Zero Gravity	World's Finest Shows			
The Cage	David Rowland and Sons Fun Fair			
Super Round Up	J&J Amusements			
Wave Rider	Classic Amusements (Canada)			
Calkins Midway's Round Up	The Mount Horeb Summer Frolic			

=== Past appearances ===
Name	Location	Opened	Closed	Notes	Ref(s)
Satellite	Kennywood	1957	1985	Later renamed Super Round Up, moved to Idlewild Park.	
The Round Up	Frontier Village	1961	1980		
Round Up	Hersheypark	1968	1977		
Satellite	Lagoon Amusement Park	1971	Unknown	Located on the north end of the park.	
Halley's Comet	Kings Island	1972	1979		
The Milk Churn	Loudoun Castle	Unknown	Unknown		
Spinnaker	Six Flags Great America	1976	1977	Replaced by the Tidal Wave Shuttle Loop roller coaster in 1978.	
Propeller Spin	Knott's Berry Farm	1976	1989	Situated in the park's former Roaring 20s Airfield section it featured a large propeller spinning in the center.	
Pharaoh's Eye	Canada's Wonderland	1981	1987	Was removed to make room for Racing Rivers in 1988. It was located in Grande World Exposition Of 1890. Psyclone and Sledge Hammer sit on the Former site of Pharaoh's Eye and Swing Of Siam (now Swing Of The Century across from Crystal Arcade in Action Zone).Pharaoh's Eye was bought by an amusement park in South America after the 1987 Season.	
Super Spiral	Martin's Fantasy Island	1993	2001	Located where Tilt-A-Whirl is. Removed due to age.	
Super Round Up	J&J Amusements	Unknown			
Super Round Up	Conneaut Lake Park	Unknown	2010	Closed in 2010 and later removed in 2013.	
Round Up	Lakemont Park	Unknown	2016	Closed in 2016 when the park temporarily closed for renovations. Eventually removed during 2018.	
Super Round Up	Coney Island (Cincinnati)	Unknown	2019		
Super Round Up	Bell's Amusement Park	Unknown	Unknown		

== See also ==
- Gravitron
- Rotor (ride)
- Tagada
