= Caterpillar (ride) =

Type of spinning amusement ride

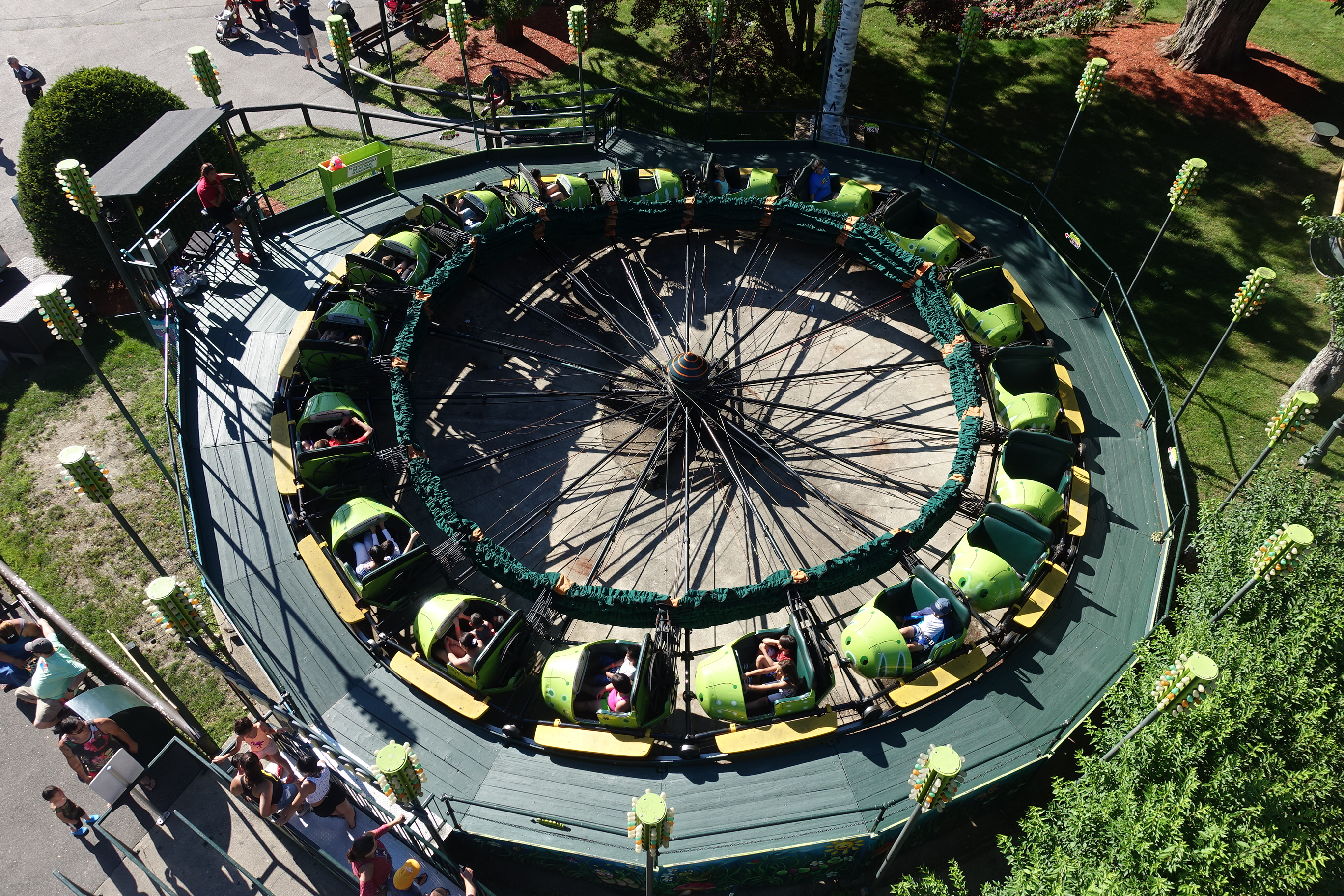
- Caterpillar at Canobie Lake Park as seen from overhead in 2019
- First manufactured: 1925
- No. of installations: At least 7 originals; 3 are still operating
- Manufacturers: Traver Engineering; Allan Herschell Company; Spillman Engineering
- Designer: Hyla F. Maynes

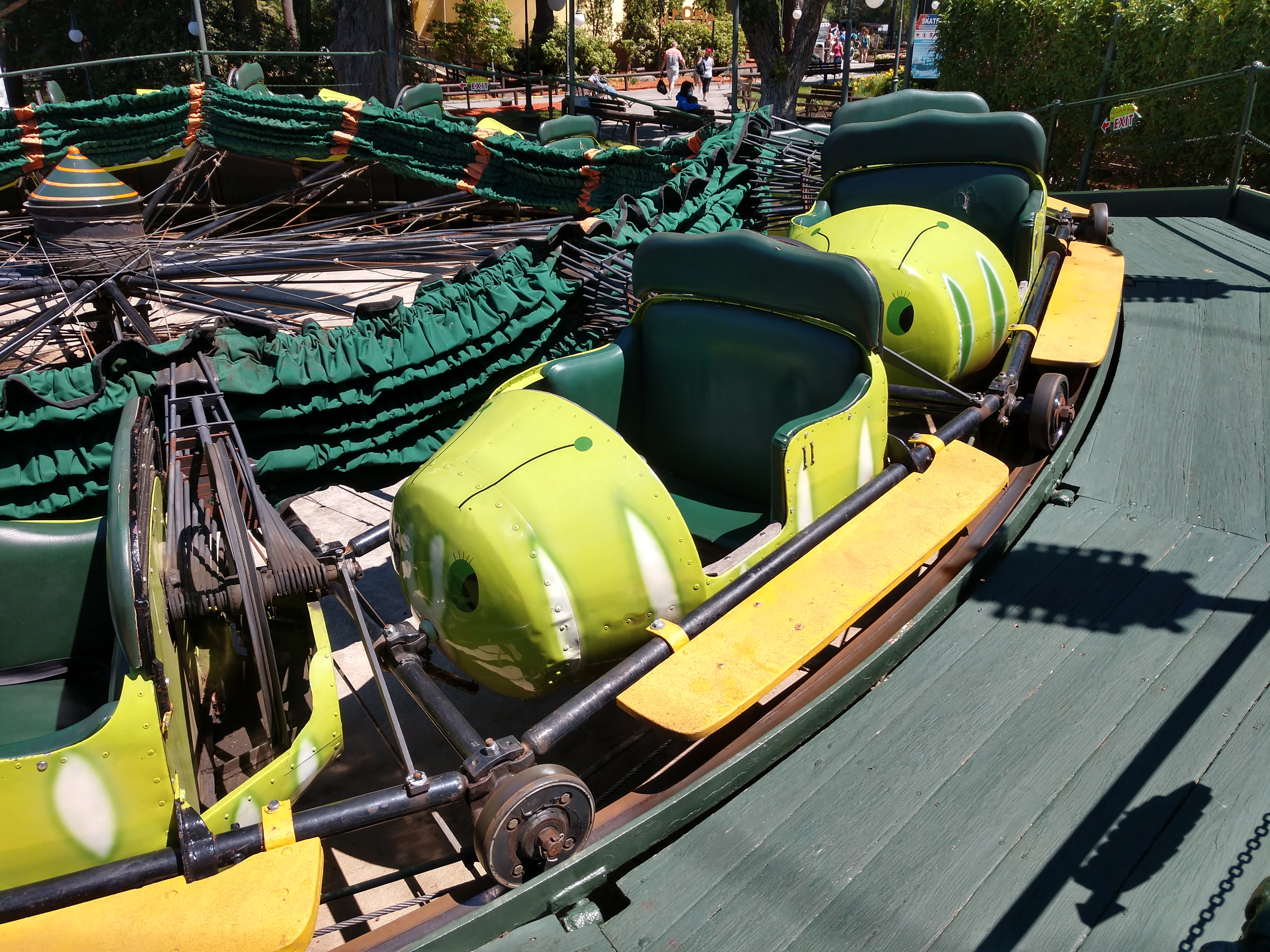
One of the cars of Canobie Lake Park's Caterpillar in 2021. The centrifuge, rods, wheels, track, and furled canopy are also shown here.

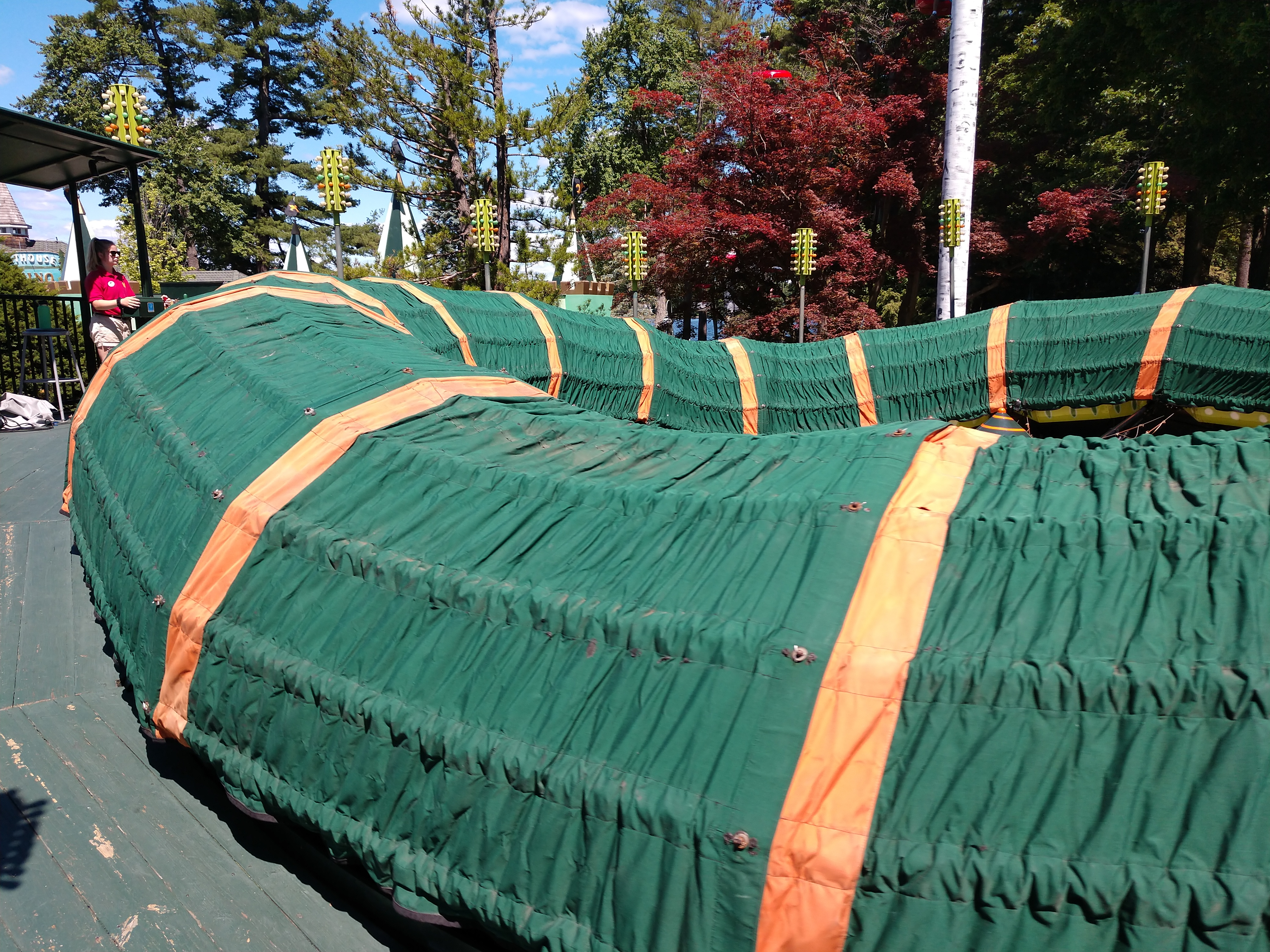
Canobie Lake Park's Caterpillar in motion with its orange-striped green canopy unfurled, covering its riders.

The Caterpillar ride is a vintage amusement ride engineered by the inventor Hyla F. Maynes of North Tonawanda, New York. The first known Caterpillar ride traveled with the Johnny Jones Exposition show in 1922. Early permanent installations debuted at Kennywood in 1923 and at Coney Island in 1925.

It generates a significant amount of centrifugal force, causing the riders on the inside of the seats to push against the riders on the outside of the seats. It was once a commonly found ride within amusement parks, but is now so rare that original Caterpillar rides can only be found operating in three parks today.

The ride features a complete circuit of motorized vehicles which are connected end-to-end all the way around the ride, in a manner similar to a Music Express. The cars travel a circular, undulating track similar to that of a Tumble Bug. The ride is notable for its canopy that begins to slowly surround the cars and fully encapsulate them once the ride reaches its maximum speed. When covered with the canopy, the ride resembles a caterpillar. A high-powered fan located under the carriage of the ride was traditionally used to surprise riders with a blast of air as the cars traverse the track.

The Caterpillar serves as the predecessor to the Music Express ride, sometimes also called Musik Express or Himalaya.

== Manufacturers ==
Caterpillar rides were manufactured by several amusement ride companies, most notably including:

- Traver Engineering
- Allan Herschell Company
- Spillman Engineering

Maynes, the inventor of the Caterpillar and owner of the patent, was paid a royalty by the companies that built the rides, and sometimes by the buyers of the rides.

== Locations ==
=== Operating ===
The only three original Caterpillars still known to be operating are at:

- Canobie Lake Park in Salem, New Hampshire as Caterpillar (operating with original canopy). Opened in 1963 and built by Allan Herschell Company.
- Heritage Park Historical Village in Calgary, Alberta (operating with original canopy). Opened in 1984 and built by Spillman Engineering. Dates back to 1928.
- Scarborough Fair Collection in North Yorkshire, England as Caterpillar (dating back to 1928). Opened in 2008 and built by Henri de Vos.

Modern remakes of the ride exist at:

- Great Yarmouth Pleasure Beach in Norfolk, England as Mulan (operating with original canopy)
- Knoebels Amusement Resort in Elysburg, Pennsylvania as Cosmotron (previously operated at West View Park, sold to Knoebels and operated as a Caterpillar until it was converted to an indoor Himalaya in a 1998 renovation). Opened in 1978 and built by Allan Herschell Company.
- Niagara Amusement Park & Splash World as Caterpillar (The ride is currently under construction here. It originally operated at Pavilion Nostalgia Park, a small portion of the Myrtle Beach Pavilion park, until 2006. It was later relocated to Broadway at the Beach. This version of the ride was constructed by Mack Rides. The ride has a roof but no canopy.)

=== In storage ===
Original Caterpillar rides in storage are at:

- Idlewild and Soak Zone in Ligonier, Pennsylvania as Caterpillar (with original canopy and undercarriage fan). Opened in 1947 and closed in 2012, pending refurbishment. Built by Allan Herschell Company.
- Dreamland Margate in Kent, England as Caterpillar (previously operated at Adventure Coast Southport until 2006). Opened in 2018 and closed the same year. The manufacturer is unknown.
- Folly Farm Adventure Park and Zoo in Pembrokeshire, Wales (originally a Mont Blanc, converted to a Toboggan ride in 1950, later converted to a Caterpillar with operating canopy in 1953 by Orton & Spooner). Opened in 2001 and built by R.J. Lakin.

=== Notable defunct installations ===
- Until 2011, DelGrosso's Park had a Caterpillar ride called Space Odyssey, which was situated inside a wooden dome-like building. The ride was installed 1983, having previously operated at nearby Lakemont Park, which was going through financial issues at the time. The ride was moved to Delgrosso's Park and enclosed with many special effects, including a spinning disco ball that lowered from the ceiling and blacklight neon posters. The ride was built by Allan Herschell Company.
