= Music Express =

Amusement ride

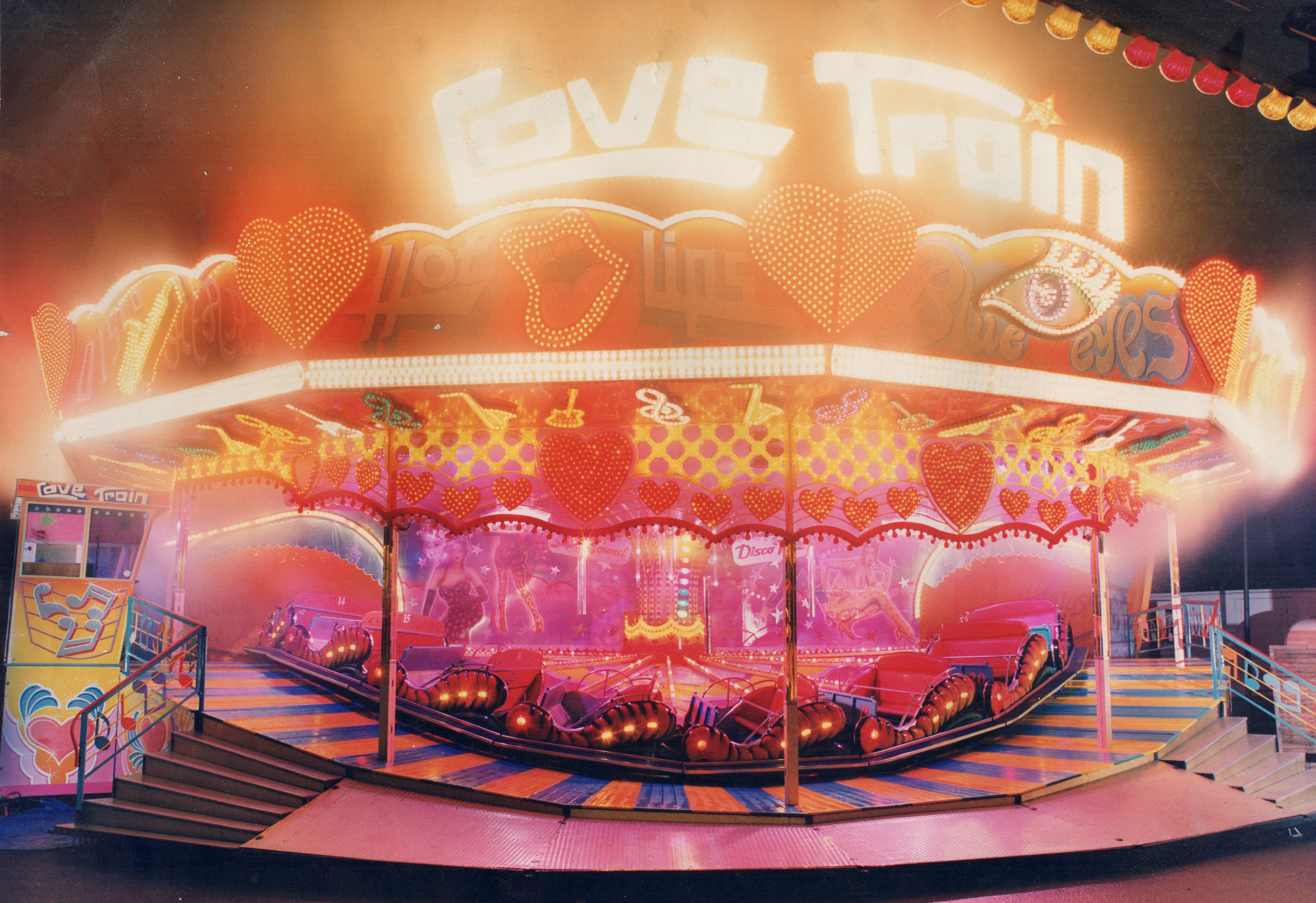
The Love Train is an example of the Music Express ride when lit at night.

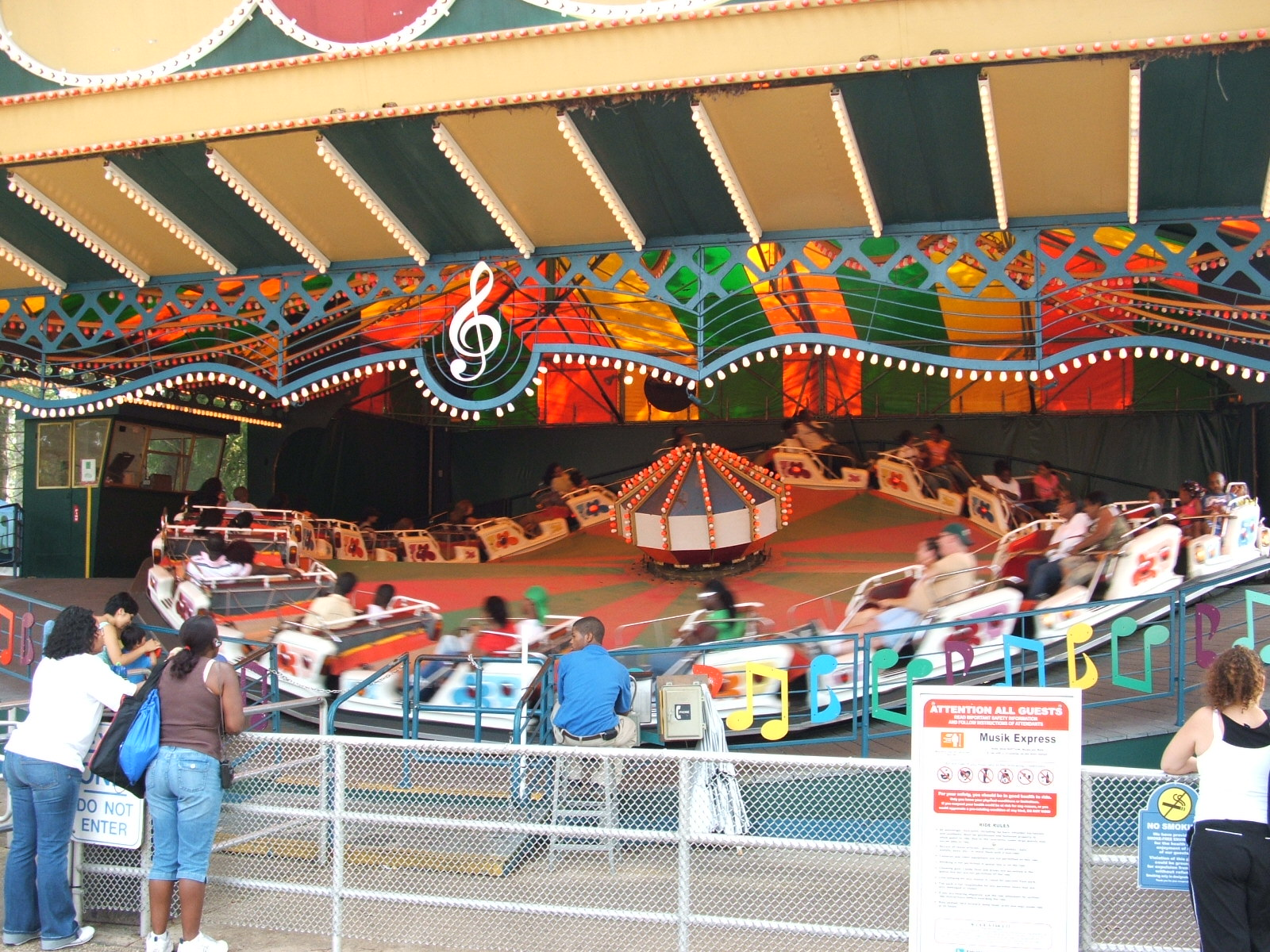
A Music Express in operation at Six Flags Great Adventure

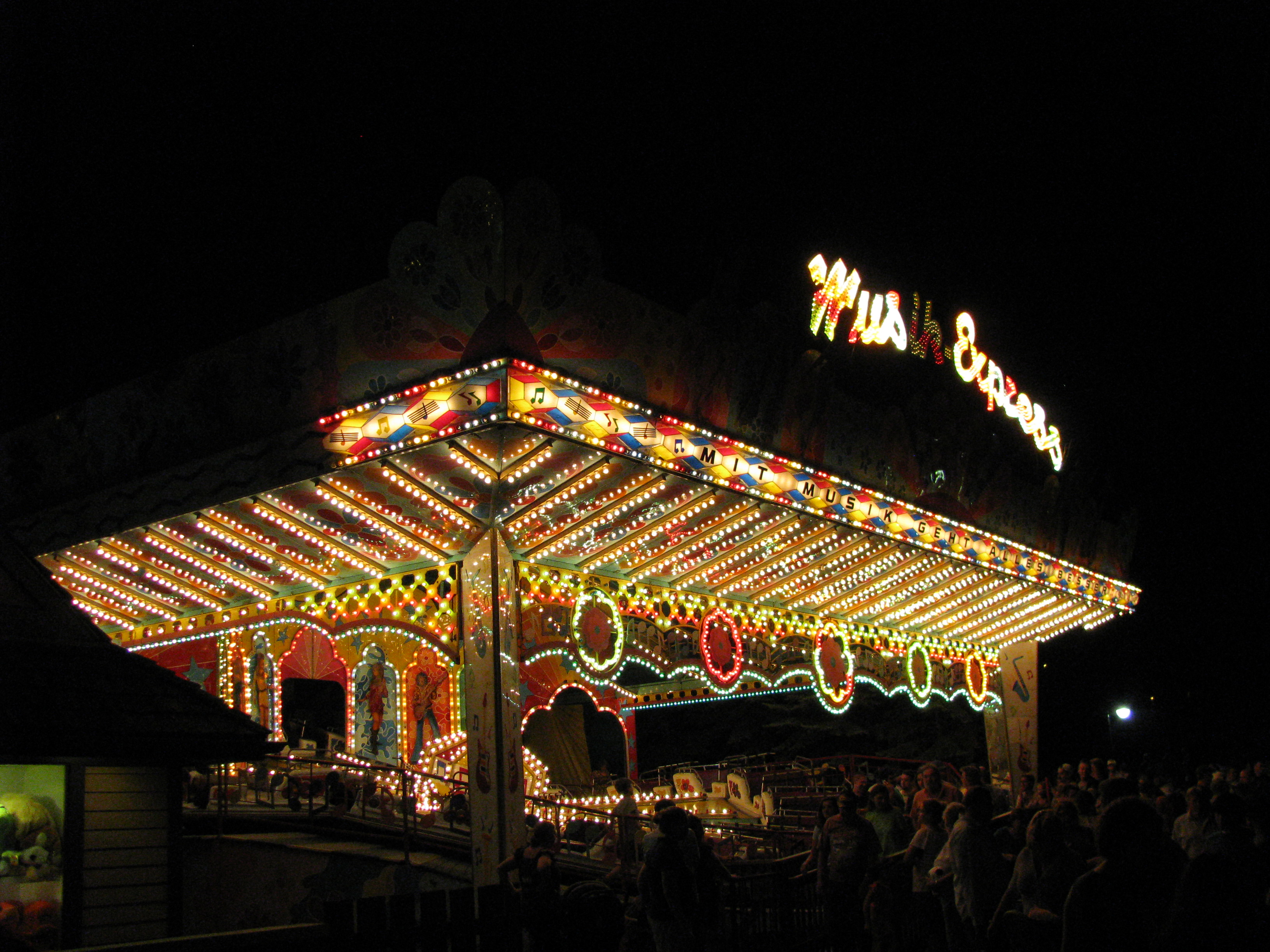
A Music Express at night in operation at Kennywood Park

A Music Express is an amusement ride based on the original Caterpillar rides. Several near-identical ride designs are also produced by other companies: Musik Express by Italian company Bertazzon and US Majestic Rides, Himalaya by American company Wisdom Rides, German company Mack, and French company Reverchon, and Silver Streak by Wisdom Rides. This ride is a modern adaptation of the famous Harry Traver Caterpillar rides.

== Design and operation ==
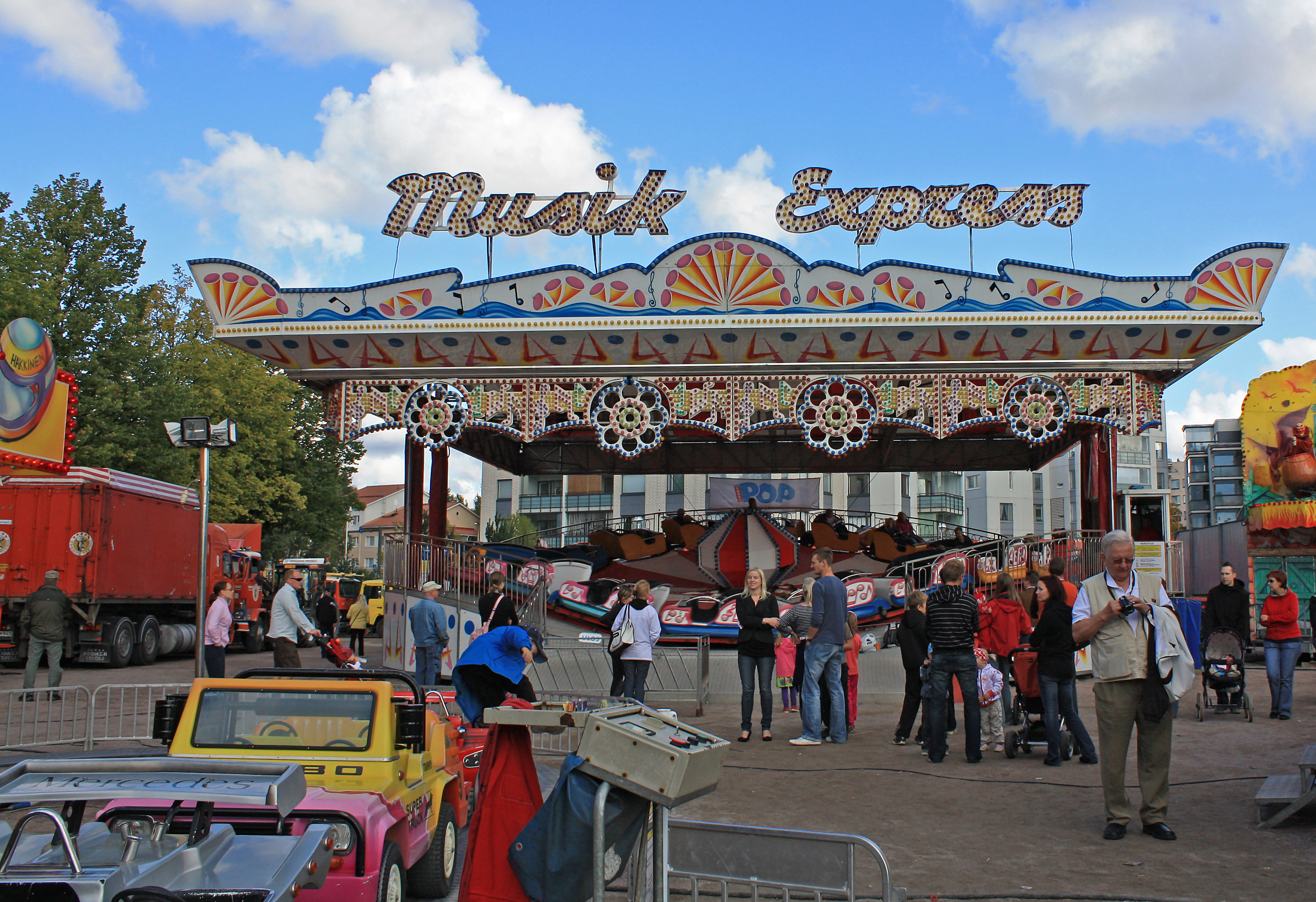
Musik Express of Suomen Tivoli during the 2009 Circus Festival in Kerava, Finland

The ride features twenty 3-passenger cars connected in a circle. These cars rotate on a track with alternating sloped and flat sections. Rotation is possible in both a backward and forward direction, as the ride is manually operated. The ride is powered by 4 DC motors, and can reach a maximum speed of 12 revolutions per minute. (Certain older models have a hydraulic tire/rim drive and they have a tendency to go faster).

The riders in each car are restrained by a single solid lap bar that is locked across the body of the car, making the ride unsuitable for young children or people of short stature. The bar must be manually locked or unlocked, and only locks in one position. Lights and music are also controlled by the operator, which (as the name suggests) contribute heavily to the ride experience. After a certain amount of rotations or minutes, the ride operator will be alerted by the control box that the speed is going to increase, usually by a light on the box. At that time the operator will speak on a microphone asking the riders if they would like to go faster. Sometimes the ride operator can do this earlier than the alert light to build suspense. After a minute or two of faster speed, the ride will then slow down, and the operator can then ask the riders if they would like to go backwards. The speed up element is then repeated again only done in reverse. Most parks and carnivals require riders to be at least 42 inches or even taller, depending on circumstances and ride design.

Most Music Expresses are built with a backdrop dividing the rear third of the ride from the front two-thirds. This backdrop, normally covered in artwork and lights, provides a mild headchopper-like effect as the riders enter and exit the rear section. As this blocks lines of sight, additional staff are required to safely supervise this ride in operation.

More common in Europe than the US, some Music Express rides have a canopy that the operator can use to cover the ride while in operation, very much like the old caterpillar rides.

At Kennywood Park's and Dorney Park & Wildwater Kingdom's Musik Express, written above are the words "Mit Musik Geht Alles Besser", which translated from German reads, "With Music Everything Goes Better."

The variant used in fairs across Hawaii feature murals of several famous artists, such as the Beatles, Jimi Hendrix, Janis Joplin, Elvis Presley, the logo of the Rolling Stones, and even fictional bands and singers.

== Variations ==
Video of Super Himalaya at Cedar Point, a Mack Rides variation

Bertazzon Musik Express
No major variations from Mack Rides version.
Majestic Manufacturing Musik Express
14 cars, hydraulic locking system, increased top RPM.
Wisdom Rides Himalaya
22 cars.
Mack Rides Himalaya
Music Express, Diskothek

Reverchon Himalaya
Original Himalaya ride design.

Wisdom Rides Silver Streak
16 cars, smaller height difference, multiple lap bar positions.

SDC Amor Express
Billed as "The Love Machine", circa late 70s, with hydraulic drive and canopy, very much like the original caterpillar rides. Not many found in US anymore but they still can be found in European fair circuits and parks.

== Appearances ==
| Name | Manufacturer | Location | Opened | Status | Closed | Notes |
|---|---|---|---|---|---|---|
| Aztek Express | Mack Rides | Bobbejaanland | 1996 | Operating | | |
| Cannonball Express | Mack Rides | Great Escape | 1985 | Operating | | |
| Cosmotron | Wisdom Rides | Knoebels Amusement Resort | 1998 | Operating | | Fully enclosed. Converted from a Caterpillar ride |
| Crab Race | Wisdom Rides | Fantasy Island | 2021 | Operating | | |
| Electric Ring | Preston & Barbieri | Legendia | c.2014 | Operating | | Previously located at Sommerland Syd as Safari-Expressen (unknown-2012). |
| Expreso Musical | Mack Rides | Six Flags México | 1990 | Operating | | |
| Fantasia | Sobbema | Coney Beach Pleasure Park | 1999 | Operating | | |
| Flash: Speed Force | Mack Rides | Six Flags Magic Mountain | 1974 | Operating | | Formerly named Himalaya, Subway, ACME Atom Smasher, and Atom Smasher. |
| Galaxy | Soli | Adventureland | 1980 | Defunct | 1990 | |
| Hilltopper | Mack Rides | California's Great America | 1977 | Defunct | | |
| Himalaya | Wisdom Rides | Adventureland | 2000 | Defunct | 2022 | |
| Himalaya | Reverchon | Kentucky Kingdom | 1990 | Operating | | Standing But Not Operating (SBNO) along with the rest of the park 2009–2013. |
| Himalaya | Reverchon | Sylvan Beach Amusement Park | 2009 | Operating | | Previously located at Casino Pier (1966-2000's). |
| Himalaya | Reverchon | Trimper's Rides | 1976 | Operating | | |
| Industrial Revolution | Mack Rides | Six Flags Great America | 1977 | Defunct | 1984 | Formerly named Hilltopper |
| Music Express | Preston & Barbieri | Allou! Fun Park | 2018 | Operating | | |
| Music Express | Moser Rides | Hersheypark | 1999 | Operating | | |
| Music Express | Mack Rides | Indiana Beach | 2011 | Operating | | |
| Music Express | Mack Rides | Playland | c.1981 | Defunct | 2022 | |
| Music Express | SBF Visa Group | PowerPark | 2002 | Operating | | |
| Music Express | Modern Products | Rainbow Park | 1975 | Defunct | 2008 | Previously located at Ocean Beach Fun Fair (1975–1995). |
| Music Express | Mack Rides | Rusutsu Resort | 1997 | Operating | | |
| Music Express | Wisdom RIdes | Rye Playland | 2008 | Operating | | |
| Music Express | Bertazzon | Seabreeze Amusement Park | 2008 | Operating | | Previously located at Wild West World (2007). |
| Music Express | Bertazzon | Waldameer & Water World | 2013 | Operating | | |
| Music Pop | Unknown | Lake Winnepesaukah | Unknown | Defunct | | |
| Musik Express | Bertazzon | Casino Pier | 2014 | Operating | | |
| Musik Express | Mack Rides | Cliff's Amusement Park | 2005 | Operating | | Previously located at Miracle Strip Amusement Park (1973–2003). |
| Musik Express | Mack Rides | Dorney Park | 1984 | Operating | | |
| Musik Express | Mack Rides | Kennywood | 1987 | Operating | | |
| Musik Express | Mack Rides | Kuwait Magic | c.2007 | Operating | | Previously located at Yokohama Dreamland (1980–2002). |
| Musik Express | Mack Rides | Lagoon | 1982 | Operating | | |
| Musik Express | Preston & Barbieri | M&D's | 2017 | Operating | | Formerly named Kiss Me Quick Previously located at Sofia Land (2002–2006), and Dreamland Margate (2015–2016). |
| Musik Express | Bertazzon | Morey's Piers | 1991 | Operating | | |
| Musik Express | Mack Rides | Six Flags Great Adventure | 1976 | Defunct | 2007 | |
| Muzik Express | Mack Rides | Geauga Lake | 1978 | Defunct | 2002 | |
| Ooort's Express | SBF Visa Group | Berjaya Times Square Theme Park | 2003 | Operating | | |
| Rev Booster | SBF Visa Group | Ocean Park Hong Kong | 2011 | Operating | | |
| Rip Curl | Wisdom Rides | Fun Spot Orlando | 2013 | Operating | | |
| Rock & Roll | Bertazzon | Belle City Amusements | 2003 | Operating | | |
| Rock & Roll | Bertazzon | Fun Spot Kissimmee | 2022 | Operating | | |
| Rock & Roll | Bertazzon | Playland's Castaway Cove | 2021 | Operating | | |
| Rock Jet | Reverchon | Gröna Lund | 1976 | Operating | | |
| Rockin' Reeler | Reverchon | Worlds of Fun | 1991 | Defunct | 2005 | |
| Space Race | Sobema | Flambards Theme Park | 1990 | Operating | | Formerly named Chariot Race Previously traveled German fair circuit (1987–1988) and located at Great Yarmouth Pleasure Beach (1990). |
| Super Himalaya | Mack Rides | Cedar Point | 1970 | Operating | | |
| SuperCat | Preston & Barbieri | Valleyfair | 1976 | Operating | | |
| Tango Train | SBF Visa Group | Luna Park Sydney | 2016 | Operating | | |
| Tsunami | Bertazzon | Santa Cruz Beach Boardwalk | 1999 | Operating | | |
| Yucatan | Mack Rides | PortAventura Park | 1995 | Operating | | |
