= Wild West World =

Former Wild West theme park in Park City, Kansas, United States

- Interactive map of Wild West World
- Location: Park City, Kansas
- Coordinates: 37.818209°N 97.321229°W
- Status: Defunct
- Opened: May 5, 2007
- Closed: July 9, 2007
- Owner: Wild West World LLC Restoration Farms Inc
- Operated by: Wild West World LLC Restoration Farms Inc
- Theme: Wild West
- Area: 130 acres (53 ha)

Wild West World was a Wild West theme park in Park City, Kansas that opened on May 5, 2007 and closed on July 9, 2007. It was located on 130 acres (53 ha) along Interstate 135 near Phil Ruffin's Wichita Greyhound Park, which closed the same year.

== History ==
The park was owned, developed, and operated by Thomas and Cheryl Etheredge doing business as Wild West World, LLC and Restoration Farms, Inc. They also owned the Prairie Rose Chuck Wagon entertainment venue in Butler County.

The announcement for the park appeared in the Wichita Eagle on December 19, 2004. Groundbreaking began on August 15, 2005. It was billed as the only all-western theme park in the world, and the first major one in Kansas. The claim to being the only all-western one is a mere technicality because Frontier City in Oklahoma City, has one non-western-themed ride (Mindbender) in an otherwise western-themed park. According to the Hutchinson News the rides were off-the-shelf carnival attractions dressed up in a western facade.

== Closure ==
On July 9, 2007, barely two months after the park opened, the owners filed for bankruptcy and closed it down. They cited lagging attendance and bad weather as the main factors for the decision, but experts also point to an inadequate business plan and a poor theming choice. They were also forced to close and sell the Prairie Rose Chuck Wagon. The park was for sale, and the owners publicly stated that they hoped to reopen it in the future. However, no sale materialized. The fixtures, equipment, and materials were auctioned by Bud Palmer Auctions. A few empty buildings are all that remain, but all remaining structures and landscaping were auctioned off on November 6, 2010 so that the site could be bulldozed and prepared for future development. However, the site has still not been bulldozed, so all that remains is the Johnny Western Theatre and a shed. The land is owned by the same people who own Crosswinds Casino, with no development of the land confirmed. After Wild West World closed, Etheredge created an alpaca business in Texas, near San Antonio.

== Securities fraud ==
On April 19, 2009, Thomas Etheredge was arrested on 10 counts of securities fraud related to investments in the park totaling $800,000, much of which was raised from the members of Wichita's Summit Church. The Summit Church split from Immanuel Baptist Church, where Etheredge had also been a member, when pastor Terry Fox resigned, and the new church congregated in the Johnny Western Theater on the park grounds during construction. After the park filed bankruptcy, it was learned that Etheredge had previously served three years in prison for securities fraud in another investment scheme. He was convicted on February 10, 2010 on 7 counts of securities fraud. He was sentenced on April 2 to five years in prison, and paroled on July 29, 2013. Etheredge was caught similarly in the 1980s, running an aloe vera farm in Belize after his business in the United States, Bethany Trust, promised to be a merchant bank that would finance businesses. He swayed around 60 people in Texas and 60 people in Missouri to give him money, as he used this money for more personal things.

== See also ==
- List of defunct amusement parks
  - Joyland Amusement Park
  - Wonderland Park
