= American Coaster Enthusiasts =

Non-profit roller coaster organization

- Abbreviation: ACE
- Founded: 1978; 48 years ago
- Founders: Roy Brashears; Paul Greenwald; Richard Munch
- Location: Grand Prairie, Texas, U.S.
- Members: over 7,200
- President: Derek Perry
- Website: www.ridewithace.com

American Coaster Enthusiasts (ACE) is a non-profit organization focusing on the enjoyment, knowledge, and preservation of roller coasters as well as recognition of some as architectural and engineering landmarks. Dues-paying members receive the quarterly magazine RollerCoaster! and bi-monthly newsletter ACE News. Amusement parks have also invited members to exclusive ride events and behind the scenes tours at amusement parks as well as sneak peek events at new roller coasters under construction.

The organization maintains an online database of roller coasters including ride specifications and archives of published news articles. The club also recognizes historically significant roller coasters with ACE Coaster Classic and ACE Coaster Landmark statuses.

== History ==
Organization founders Roy Brashears, Paul Greenwald and Richard Munch met at a roller coaster riding marathon event promoting the 1977 movie Rollercoaster at the Rebel Yell roller coaster (now called Racer 75) at Kings Dominion amusement park in Doswell, Virginia. The three discovered they shared the same passion for roller coasters and decided to form a club that would allow others that shared the same interests to join. They organized Coaster Con I the following year at Busch Gardens Williamsburg theme park in June 1978. On the final day of the event during a business meeting, the name American Coaster Enthusiasts (ACE) was chosen as the club's name. Coaster Con events have been held annually ever since.

== Structure ==
The organization is almost entirely run by volunteers, with the exception of an independent contractor who runs certain day-to-day operations regarding mailings, receipt of event payment/membership dues and merchandise. ACE members are required to pay annual membership dues that are available in individual, couple, family and corporate packages. The organization fulfills one of its primary goals of providing education through its publications. Other goals include promoting the conservation, appreciation, and enjoyment of roller coasters and their place in history as architectural and engineering landmarks.

ACE is governed by an executive committee of five officers and seven directors. Four of the officer positions are directly elected and one indirectly elected by the club's membership. These officers are the president, vice president, treasurer, secretary and immediate past president. The seven directors are appointed by the president and approved by a majority vote of the remaining officers. The region director oversees a system of ACE regions, which sponsors events and publishes regional websites and email newsletters.

ACE Regions

- California Northern
- Canada (except British Columbia)
- Eastern Great Lakes (Ohio and Michigan)
- Europe
- Florida
- Heart of America (Arkansas, Kansas, Missouri and southern Illinois)
- Mid-Atlantic (Delaware, District of Columbia, Maryland and Virginia)
- Midwest (Indiana, Kentucky, West Virginia)
- New England (Connecticut, Massachusetts, Maine, New Hampshire, Rhode Island and Vermont)
- New Jersey
- New York
- North Central (Iowa, Minnesota, North Dakota, Nebraska, South Dakota)
- Northwest (Alaska, British Columbia, Idaho, Montana, Oregon, Washington)
- Other Countries
- Pacific Southwest (Arizona, Hawaii, Nevada and southern California)
- Pennsylvania Eastern
- Pennsylvania Western
- Rocky Mountain (Colorado, New Mexico, Utah and Wyoming)
- South America
- South Central (Louisiana, Oklahoma and Texas)
- Southeast (Alabama, Georgia, Mississippi, North Carolina, South Carolina and Tennessee)
- Western Great Lakes (Wisconsin and northern Illinois)

== Events ==
The national organization sponsors the annual Coaster Con convention, international tours, seasonal conferences, and a conference focused on coaster preservation.

=== Coaster Con ===
Coaster Con, usually features one to as many as six theme parks where exclusive ride time is made available to members on selected coasters outside of times when the park is open to the public. Coaster Con also features photo and video contests, carnival games competitions, as well as an annual business meeting, banquet (with presentations, awards, industry keynote speaker, and auction to benefit ACE's funds), workshops, discussion groups, displays, and memorabilia sales tables.

| No. | Dates | Host parks |
|---|---|---|
| 1 | June 9–11, 1978 | Busch Gardens Williamsburg |
| 2 | June 15–17, 1979 | Kings Island |
| 3 | June 26–29, 1980 | Kennywood |
| 4 | June 25–30, 1981 | Six Flags Over Texas, Six Flags AstroWorld, Fair Park |
| 5 | June 24–27, 1982 | Hersheypark |
| 6 | June 23–26, 1983 | Elitch Gardens, Lakeside Amusement Park |
| 7 | July 11–15, 1984 | Crystal Beach Park, Canadian National Exhibition, Seabreeze Amusement Park |
| 8 | June 27–30, 1985 | Lincoln Park, Rocky Point Amusement Park, Whalom Park, Mountain Park |
| 9 | June 26–29, 1986 | Six Flags Over Georgia, Lake Winnepesaukah |
| 10 | June 22–28, 1987 | Six Flags Magic Mountain, Santa Cruz Beach Boardwalk, California's Great America |
| 11 | June 21–25, 1988 | Geauga Lake, Cedar Point, Boblo Island Amusement Park |
| 12 | June 21–25, 1989 | Dorney Park & Wildwater Kingdom, Clementon Lake Park |
| 13 | June 20–25, 1990 | Six Flags Over Texas, Wonderland Park |
| 14 | June 16–20, 1991 | Kennywood |
| 15 | June 21–25, 1992 | Kings Dominion |
| 16 | July 5–9, 1993 | Worlds of Fun, Joyland Amusement Park |
| 17 | June 4–11, 1994 | Belmont Park, Six Flags Magic Mountain, Santa Cruz Beach Boardwalk, California's Great America |
| 18 | June 18–23, 1995 | Carowinds, Family Kingdom Amusement Park, Myrtle Beach Pavilion |
| 19 | June 1–3, 1996 | Lakeside Amusement Park |
| 20 | June 6–13, 1997 | Kings Dominion, Busch Gardens Williamsburg |
| 21 | June 21–24, 1998 | Kennywood, Idlewild, Sandcastle Waterpark |
| 22 | June 20–24, 1999 | Six Flags Fiesta Texas, SeaWorld San Antonio |
| 23 | June 18–23, 2000 | Kentucky Kingdom, Holiday World & Splashin' Safari |
| 24 | June 17–22, 2001 | Hersheypark, Williams Grove Amusement Park, Dorney Park & Wildwater Kingdom, Philadelphia Toboggan Company |
| 25 | June 16–21, 2002 | Six Flags Magic Mountain, Adventure City, Knott's Berry Farm |
| 26 | June 15–20, 2003 | Busch Gardens Williamsburg, Kings Dominion |
| 27 | June 20–26, 2004 | Cedar Point, Memphis Kiddie Park, Geauga Lake |
| 28 | June 19–24, 2005 | Six Flags Great America, Little Amerricka, Mt. Olympus Water & Theme Park |
| 29 | June 18–24, 2006 | Disney's Animal Kingdom, Disney's Hollywood Studios, Old Town, Magic Kingdom, Cypress Gardens, Busch Gardens Tampa Bay |
| 30 | June 17–23, 2007 | Kings Island, Stricker's Grove, Holiday World & Splashin' Safari, Beech Bend |
| 31 | June 15–20, 2008 | Six Flags Over Georgia, Wild Adventures |
| 32 | June 21–26, 2009 | Silver Dollar City, Worlds of Fun |
| 33 | June 20–25, 2010 | Kennywood, Idlewild and Soak Zone, Conneaut Lake Park, Waldameer & Water World |
| 34 | June 19–22, 2011 | Six Flags Over Texas, Sandy Lake Amusement Park |
| 35 | June 17–22, 2012 | Dollywood, Carowinds |
| 36 | June 16–21, 2013 | Six Flags New England, Canobie Lake Park, Palace Playland, Funtown Splashtown USA |
| 37 | June 15–20, 2014 | California's Great America, Six Flags Discovery Kingdom, Santa Cruz Beach Boardwalk, Gilroy Gardens |
| 38 | June 21–26, 2015 | Six Flags Great Adventure, Storybook Land, Morey's Piers |
| 39 | June 19–23, 2016 | Six Flags St. Louis, Holiday World & Splashin' Safari |
| 40 | June 18–22, 2017 | Six Flags Fiesta Texas, ZDT's Amusement Park, SeaWorld San Antonio |
| 41 | June 17–22, 2018 | Six Flags America, Busch Gardens Williamsburg, Kings Dominion |
| 42 | June 16–21, 2019 | Six Flags Magic Mountain, Knott's Berry Farm |
| 43 (Note: Coaster Con 43 events were delayed one full year due to COVID-19 pandemic. A virtual Coaster Con known as "Coaster Con at Home" was held on the same dates.) | June 20–26, 2021 | Hersheypark, Dutch Wonderland, Dorney Park & Wildwater Kingdom, Knoebels Amusement Resort |
| 44 | June 19–24, 2022 | Cedar Point, Kennywood |
| 45 | June 18–23, 2023 | Dollywood, Carowinds |
| 46 | June 16–21, 2024 | California's Great America, Six Flags Discovery Kingdom, Santa Cruz Beach Boardwalk |
| 47 | June 15–20, 2025 | Six Flags Great America, Little Amerricka, Indiana Beach |
| 48 | June 21–26, 2026 | Six Flags New England, Lake Compounce, Great Escape |
| 49 | June 20–25, 2027 | Silver Dollar City, Mid America Adventure |

== Awards ==
=== ACE Coaster Classic ===
The ACE Coaster Classic award was developed in the early 1990s at a time when changes and modernizations in the design, equipment, and operation of wooden roller coasters threatened to replace the traditional wooden coaster experience. The award is given to coasters that continue to adhere to the characteristics of the classic wooden coaster while providing a safe ride. To be eligible for ACE Coaster Classic status, a coaster must meet the following criteria:

- Traditional lap bars that allow riders to experience so-called airtime, the sensation of floating above the seat, must be installed. Individual, ratcheting lap bars do not meet this requirement.
- Riders must be able to slide from side-to-side in their seats. A coaster with any restraint or device that restricts this freedom, like seat dividers between riders, does not meet this requirement.
- Riders must be able to view upcoming drops and thrills. A coaster with headrests on every seat or the majority of seats that restrict this view does not meet this requirement.
- Riders must be free to choose where they sit. A coaster where riders are assigned seats before boarding does not meet this requirement.

The amusement park or theme park operating a roller coaster that is recognized as ACE Coaster Classic is usually presented with a custom plaque. The plaque typically states:

THE AMERICAN COASTER ENTHUSIASTS RECOGNIZES THIS COASTER AS AN ACE COASTER CLASSIC.

ACE salutes this park for maintaining this coaster as an American treasure in its purest form. We congratulate you for the use of traditional materials, methods and equipment, which are fundamental to the classic wooden roller coaster experience.

ACE commends this park for operating this coaster in the traditional manner so that future generations may enjoy its classic thrills and its enduring popularity.

It has been noted, however, that most wooden roller coasters usually have disqualifying ratcheting lap bars, seat dividers, headrests and seatbelts to prevent people from trying to stand up during the ride. For example, Rolling Thunder at Six Flags Great Adventure had traditional one-piece buzz bars which met the Coaster Classic requirements, but it is not a Coaster Classic because of headrests and seat dividers being added in 1981 to prevent people from standing up during the ride, and seatbelts were added to the trains later in 2009. It also had seat-specific gates on the platform, which also does not meet Coaster Classic criteria.

Although the Coaster Classic award is traditionally given to wooden roller coasters, there is one steel roller coaster that has been awarded Coaster Classic status, Montaña Suiza at Parque de Atracciones Monte Igueldo. This roller coaster follows the characteristics of a traditional scenic railway, but because the track is constructed of metal rails bolted to a concrete trough, it is classified as a steel roller coaster.

==== Coasters awarded ====
As of October 2026, there are 28 coasters worldwide with ACE Coaster Classic status, 19 in North America, 8 in Europe, and one in Australia. 22 of them are currently operating.

| Coaster | Park | Country | Opened | Awarded | Status |
|---|---|---|---|---|---|
| Big Dipper | Camden Park | United States | 1958 | Unknown | Operating |
| Blue Flyer | Pleasure Beach Resort | United Kingdom | 1934 (as Zipper Dipper) | Unknown | Operating |
| Blue Streak | Conneaut Lake Park | United States | May 23, 1938 | May 29, 1993 | Demolished in 2022 |
| Classic Coaster | Washington State Fair | United States | 1935 (as Roller Coaster) | Unknown | Operating |
| Comet | Waldameer & Water World | United States | 1951 | Unknown | Operating |
| Cyclone | Luna Park | United States | June 26, 1927 | Unknown | Operating |
| Cyclone | Lakeside Amusement Park | United States | May 17, 1940 | Unknown | SBNO (Note: Standing but not operating; i.e. the roller coaster is existing and constructed at the park, but not open to the public.) since 2022 |
| Cyclone | Williams Grove Amusement Park | United States | 1933 | Unknown | SBNO since 2005 |
| Hochschaubahn | Prater | Austria | 1950 | Unknown | Operating |
| Hullámvasút | Vidámpark | Hungary | 1926 (Note: Hullámvasút was built in 1922, but did not open to the public until 1926.) | Unknown | SBNO since 2015 |
| Jack Rabbit | Kennywood | United States | June 18, 1920 | Unknown | Operating |
| Kiddy Coaster | Playland | United States | May 26, 1928 | Unknown | Operating |
| Leap-The-Dips | Lakemont Park | United States | June 2, 1902 | Unknown | SBNO since 2023 |
| Lil' Dipper | Camden Park | United States | 1961 | Unknown | Operating |
| Little Dipper | Six Flags Great America | United States | 1950; relocated 2010 | Unknown | Operating |
| Meteor | Little Amerricka | United States | 1953; relocated 2003, 2007 | Unknown | Operating |
| Montaña Suiza | Parque de Atracciones Monte Igueldo | Spain | 1928 | Not yet presented | Operating |
| Nickelodeon Streak | Pleasure Beach Resort | United Kingdom | 1933 (as Roller Coaster) | Unknown | Operating |
| Nightmare | Joyland | United States | June 12, 1949 (as Roller Coaster) | Unknown | Demolished in 2015 |
| Roller Coaster | Great Yarmouth Pleasure Beach | United Kingdom | May 14, 1932 | Unknown | Operating |
| Rutschebanen | Tivoli Gardens | Denmark | June 12, 1914 | Unknown | Operating |
| Scenic Railway | Luna Park | Australia | December 13, 1912 | Unknown | Operating |
| Sea Dragon | Columbus Zoo and Aquarium | United States | 1956 (as Jet Flyer) | Unknown | Operating |
| Teddy Bear | Stricker's Grove | United States | 1996 | Unknown | Operating |
| Thunderbolt | Kennywood | United States | May 4, 1924 (as Pippin); rebuilt 1968 | Unknown | Operating |
| Vuoristorata | Linnanmäki | Finland | July 13, 1951 | 2001 | Operating |
| Wooden Roller Coaster | Playland | Canada | 1958 | Unknown | Operating |
| Zach's Zoomer | Michigan's Adventure | United States | July 22, 1994 | Unknown | Operating |

==== Rescinded awards ====
Another 17 coasters were awarded ACE Coaster Classic status, 15 in North America and 2 in Europe. However, the awards have been rescinded due to subsequent changes to the roller coasters that caused them to no longer meet the Coaster Classic criteria. In such a situation, ACE notifies the park that the coaster's award has been revoked.

| Coaster | Park | Country | Opened | Awarded | Rescinded | Reason(s) for rescinding | Status |
|---|---|---|---|---|---|---|---|
| Big Dipper | Geauga Lake | United States | 1925 (as Sky Rocket) | May 23, 1993 | 2004 | Seatbelts were added to the trains. | Demolished in 2016 |
| Blue Streak | Cedar Point | United States | May 23, 1964 | Unknown | 1995 | High headrests and individual lap bars were added to the trains. | Operating |
| Coastersaurus | Legoland Florida | United States | November 26, 2004 (as Triple Hurricane) | Unknown | 2013 | New trains with individual lap bars were installed. | Operating |
| Ghoster Coaster | Canada's Wonderland | Canada | 1981 (as Scooby's Gasping Ghoster Coaster) | Unknown | Unknown | Seatbelts were added to the trains. | Operating |
| High Roller | Valleyfair | United States | 1976 | 1996 | 2016 | New trains with individual lap bars, seatbelts and seat dividers were installed. | Operating |
| Legend | Arnolds Park | United States | June 8, 1930 (as Speed Hound) | Unknown | Unknown | Seatbelts and seat dividers were added to the trains. | Operating |
| Montaña Rusa | La Feria de Chapultepec | Mexico | October 24, 1964 | Unknown | 1994 | Individual lap bars and seatbelts were added to the trains. | Demolished in 2022 |
| Rollo Coaster | Idlewild and Soak Zone | United States | 1938 | Unknown | 2018 | New trains with individual lap bars and seat dividers were installed. | Operating |
| Rutschebanen | Dyrehavsbakken | Denmark | May 16, 1932 | Unknown | 2010 | New trains with individual lap bars and seats were installed. | Operating |
| Skyliner | Lakemont Park | United States | 1960; relocated 1987 | Unknown | Unknown | Seatbelts were added to the trains. | SBNO since 2024 |
| Starliner | Cypress Gardens | United States | 1968; relocated 2007 | Unknown | 2007 | New trains with seat dividers were installed. | Dismantled in 2010 (Note: Starliner closed after the 2008 season; it was sold and dismantled in 2010, and its parts were placed in storage. The remains of the coaster were subsequently sold to a new owner who planned to rebuild the ride at its original location in Panama City Beach; however, this never happened.) |
| Tomahawk | PortAventura Park | Spain | March 17, 1997 | Unknown | 2015 | New trains with individual laps bars were installed. | Operating |
| Wildcat | Frontier City | United States | 1968; relocated 1991 | Unknown | 1999 | New trains with individual laps bars and seat dividers were installed. | Operating |
| Woodstock Express | Kings Island | United States | 1972 (as Scooby Doo) | Unknown | Unknown | Seatbelts were added to the trains. | Operating |
| Woodstock Express | Kings Dominion | United States | 1974 (as Scooby Doo) | Unknown | Unknown | Seatbelts were added to the trains. | Operating |
| Woodstock Express | Carowinds | United States | 1975 (as Scooby Doo) | Unknown | Unknown | Seatbelts were added to the trains. | Operating |
| Zippin Pippin | Libertyland | United States | 1923 (as Pippin); rebuilt 1928 | Unknown | Unknown | Seatbelts were added to the trains. | Demolished in 2010 (Note: Zippin Pippin originally opened in 1923 at Libertyland. After the park closed in 2005, the roller coaster stood unmaintained until 2010, when it was deemed unsalvageable. The original ride was demolished, and a replica based on the original blueprints was built at Bay Beach Amusement Park; it opened on May 21, 2011. Zippin Pippin's Coaster Classic status was already rescinded during the Libertyland era. The new trains installed on the Bay Beach replica—featuring individual lap bars, seatbelts, and seat dividers—also rendered the coaster ineligible for the award.) |

=== ACE Roller Coaster Landmark ===
In 2000, ACE established the Roller Coaster Landmark program to recognize coasters of historic significance. Since then, Roller Coaster Landmark status has been awarded to 57 coasters; 52 in North America and 5 in Europe. As of October 2026, 49 of them are operating.

The first Roller Coaster Landmark status was awarded in May 2002 to Leap-The-Dips at Lakemont Park, which was the world's oldest operating roller coaster at the time. In 2023, Rutschebanen at Tivoli Gardens became the first roller coaster outside North America to be awarded Roller Coaster Landmark status.

A roller coaster that has been awarded Roller Coaster Landmark status may or may not meet the requirements for ACE Coaster Classic status. As of October 2026, there are 10 operating roller coasters that hold both Roller Coaster Landmark and Coaster Classic statuses.

The amusement park or theme park operating a roller coaster that is recognized as ACE Roller Coaster Landmark is presented with a custom plaque detailing the ride's history, characteristics, and historical significance. Parks often display the plaque in front of the awarded roller coaster.

It is not unusual for multiple roller coasters in the same park to receive Roller Coaster Landmark designation; Cedar Point, Kennywood, and Six Flags Great America each have three roller coasters that have been awarded this status. In addition, seven other parks each have two awarded coasters.

ACE Roller Coaster Landmark status and the associated plaque are permanent recognitions, even if the awarded roller coaster were to be closed and/or demolished at a later date.

Examples of ACE Roller Coaster Landmark plaques

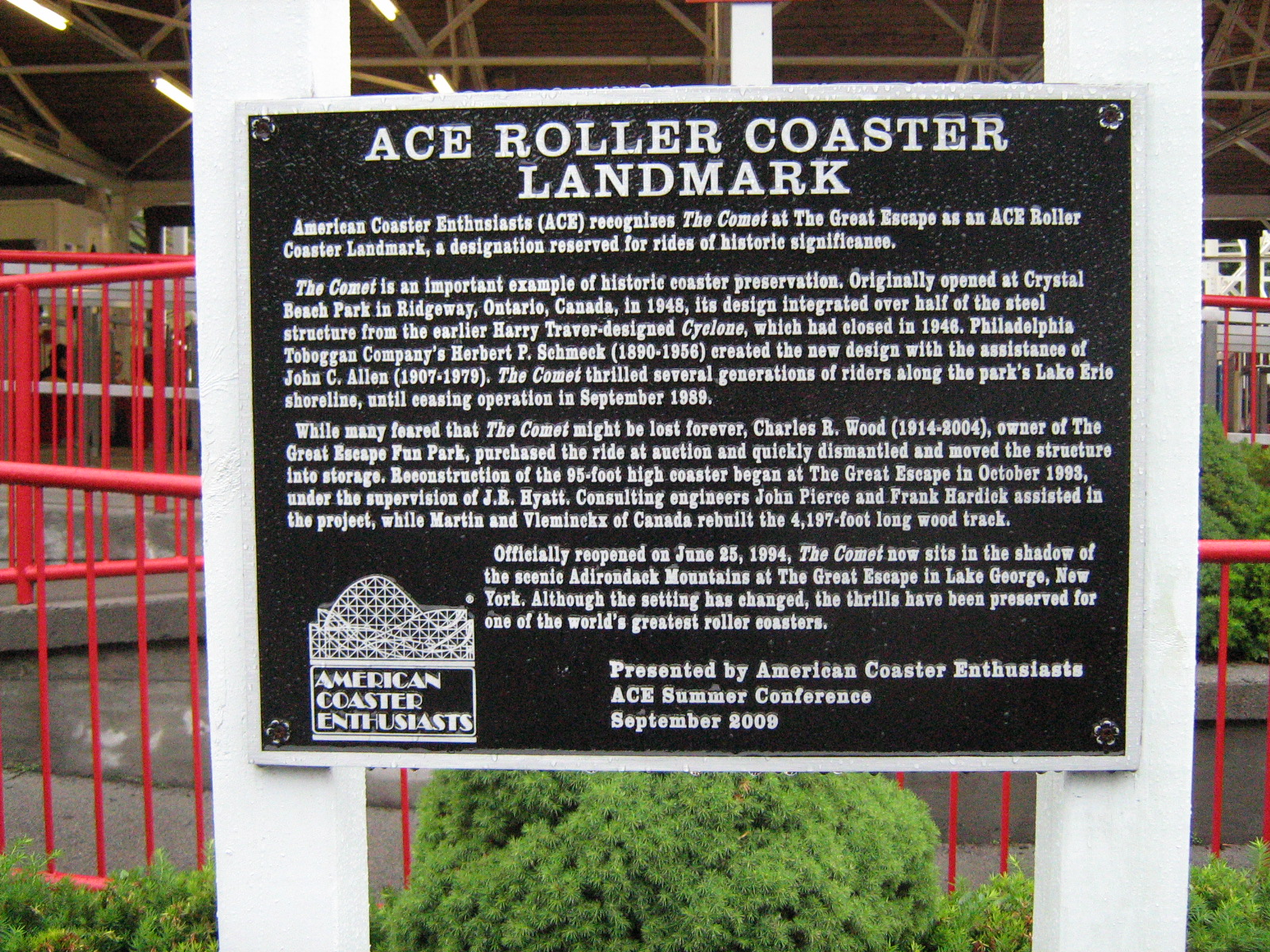
The Comet at Great Escape; originally built in 1948 from parts of the Crystal Beach Cyclone

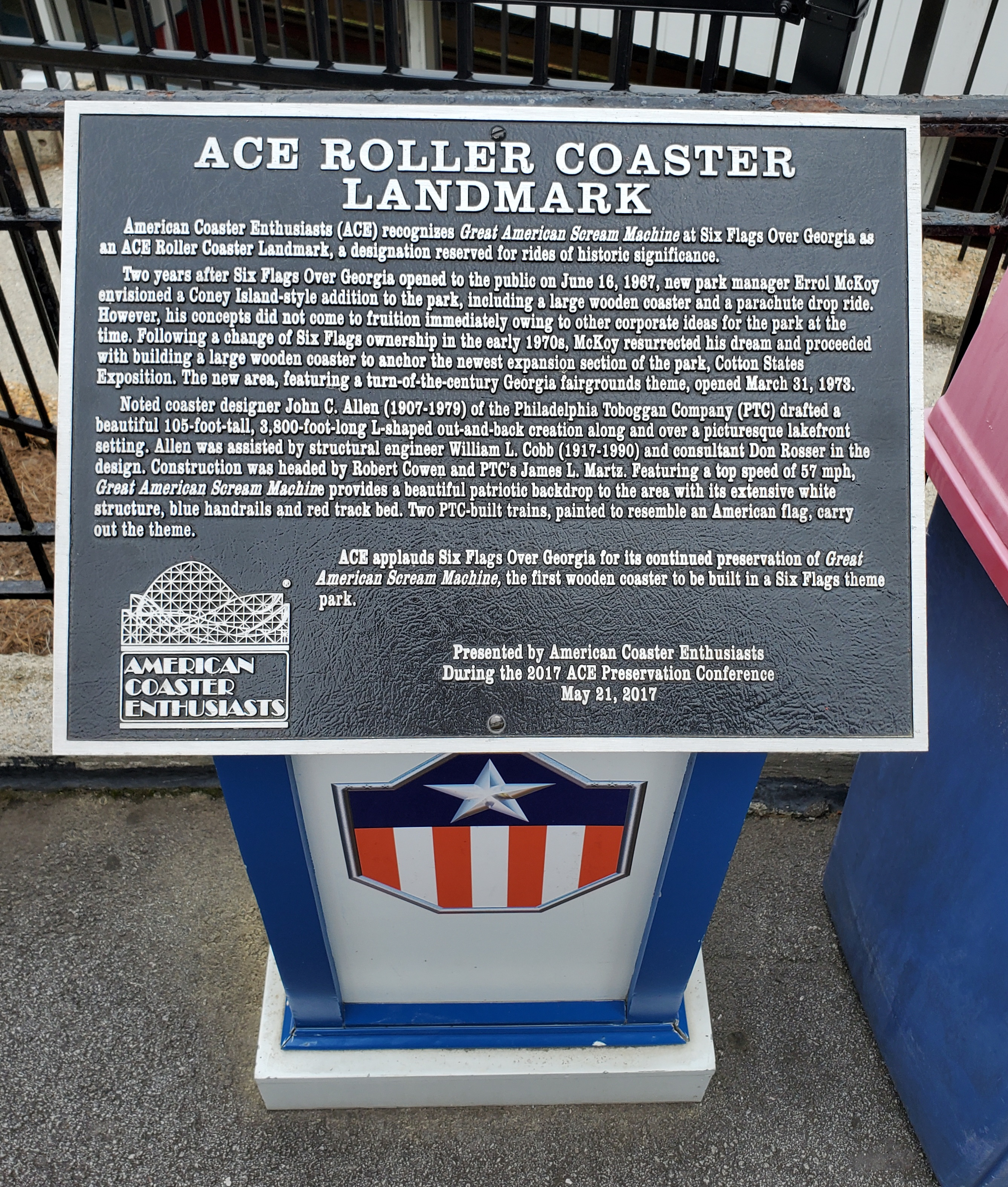
Great American Scream Machine at Six Flags Over Georgia; the former tallest, fastest and longest roller coaster in the world

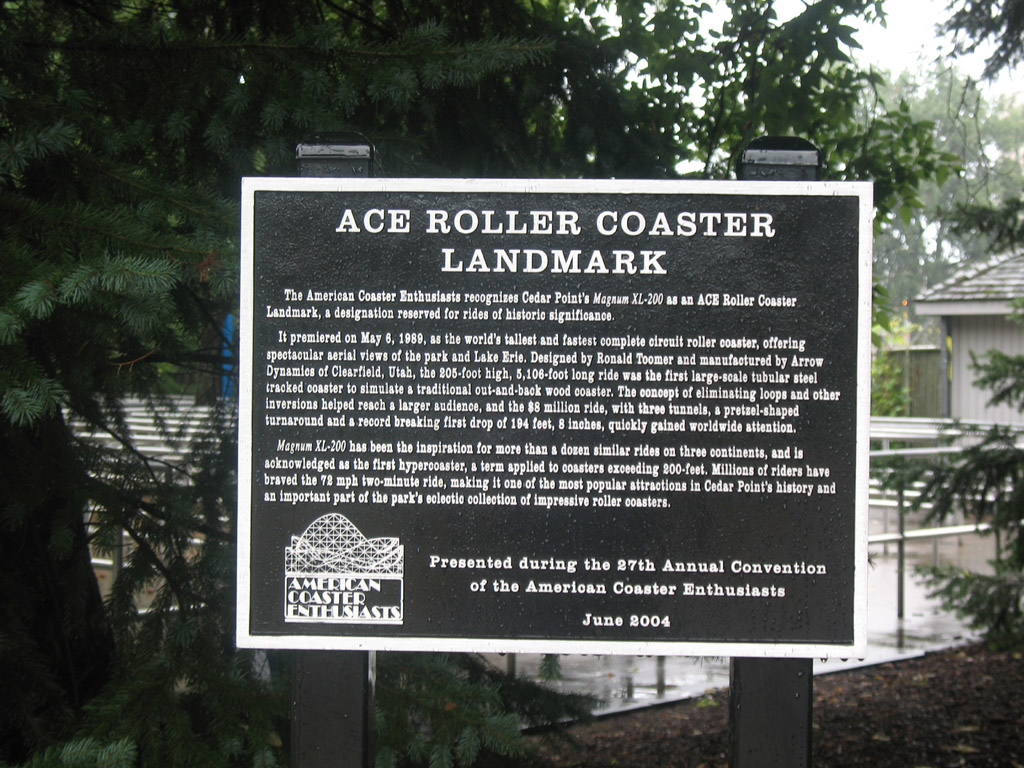
Magnum XL-200 at Cedar Point; the world's first hypercoaster

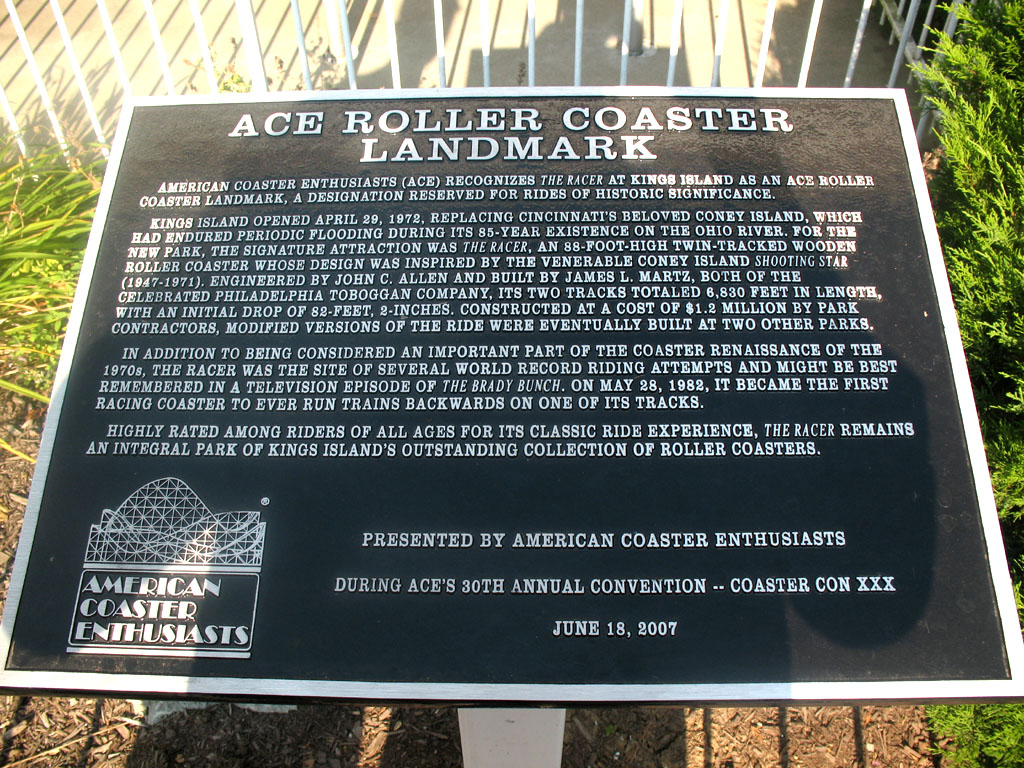
The Racer at Kings Island; a wooden racing roller coaster

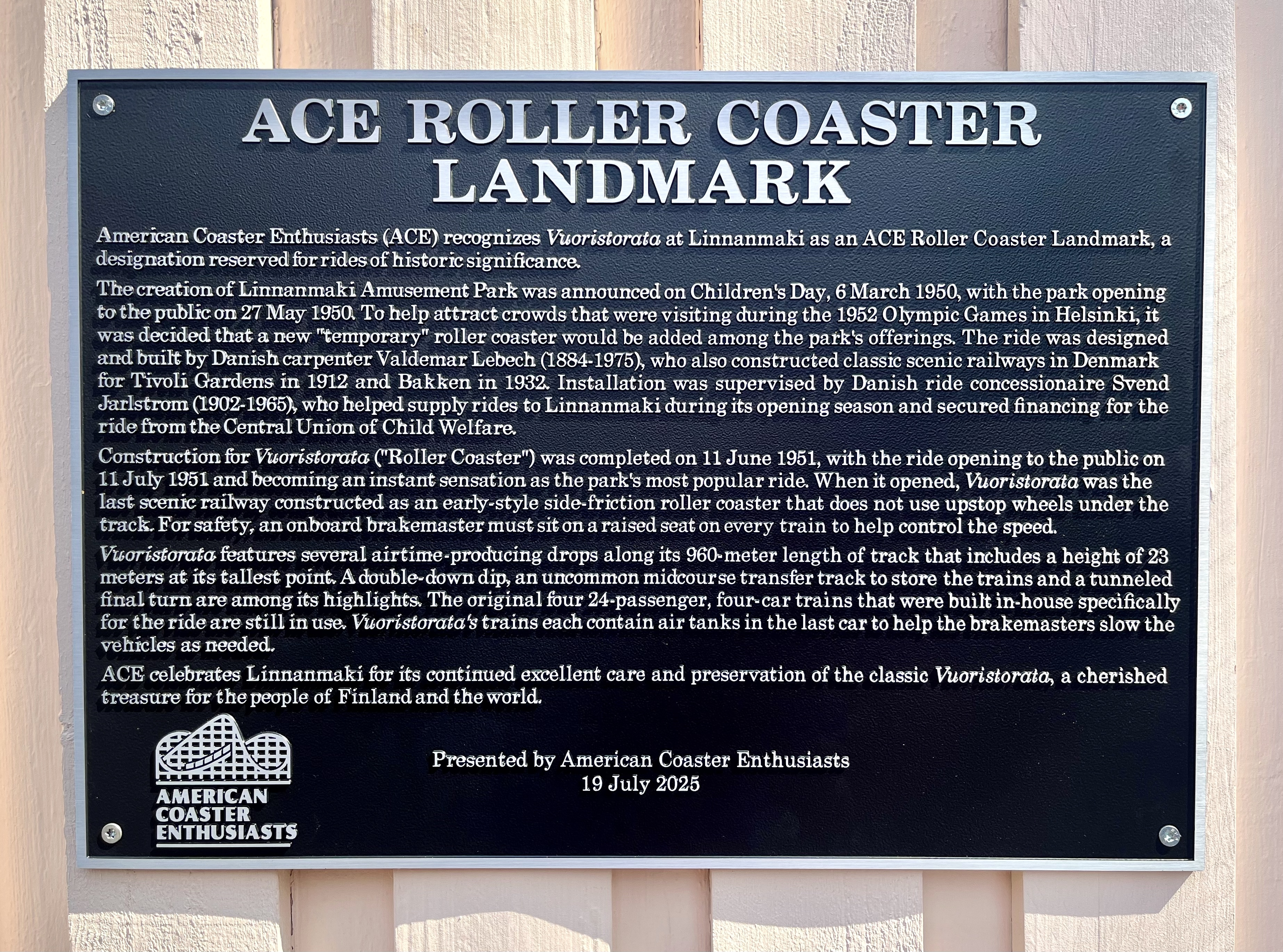
Vuoristorata at Linnanmäki; one of six operating roller coasters with brakemen.

| Coaster | Park | Country | Opened | Awarded | Status |
|---|---|---|---|---|---|
| American Eagle | Six Flags Great America | United States | May 23, 1981 | June 16, 2025 | Operating |
| Batman: The Ride | Six Flags Great America | United States | May 2, 1992 | June 20, 2005 | Operating |
| The Beast | Kings Island | United States | April 14, 1979 | October 2, 2004 | Operating |
| Big Dipper | Pleasure Beach Resort | United Kingdom | August 23, 1923 | July 2, 2024 | SBNO since 2026 |
| Big Dipper | Geauga Lake | United States | 1925 (as Sky Rocket) | Never presented (Note: ACE approved Big Dipper's Roller Coaster Landmark status in 2009, at which time the ride was closed to the public. As the ride did not reopen before its demolition, the award was never presented.) | Demolished in 2016 |
| Big Dipper | Camden Park | United States | 1958 | May 12, 2019 | Operating |
| Blue Streak | Conneaut Lake Park | United States | May 23, 1938 | June 24, 2010 | Demolished in 2022 (Note: Blue Streak closed in 2019. Prior to the coaster's demolition in 2022, ACE took possession of its Roller Coaster Landmark plaque. In 2023, the plaque was donated to the Conneaut Lake Area Historical Society, which placed it on display in its museum next to the surviving original Edward Vettel coaster car.) |
| Blue Streak | Cedar Point | United States | May 23, 1964 | June 20, 2022 | Operating |
| Bobsleds | Seabreeze Amusement Park | United States | 1954 (as Junior Coaster); rebuilt 1962 | June 27, 2026 | Operating |
| Cannon Ball | Lake Winnepesaukah | United States | May 1967 | May 20, 2017 | Operating |
| Classic Coaster | Washington State Fair | United States | 1935 (as Roller Coaster) | September 7, 2013 | Operating |
| The Comet | Great Escape | United States | 1948; relocated 1994 | September 13, 2009 | Operating |
| Comet | Hersheypark | United States | May 30, 1946 | June 22, 2021 | Operating |
| Corkscrew | Cedar Point | United States | May 15, 1976 | September 12, 2026 | Operating |
| Corkscrew | Silverwood Theme Park | United States | May 21, 1975; relocated 1990 | August 27, 2011 | Operating |
| Cyclone | Luna Park | United States | June 26, 1927 | June 29, 2002 | Operating |
| Cyclone | Lakeside Amusement Park | United States | May 17, 1940 | August 2, 2003 | SBNO since 2022 |
| Dragon Coaster | Playland | United States | May 1, 1929 | August 8, 2009 | Operating |
| Flying Turns | Knoebels Amusement Resort | United States | October 5, 2013 | July 25, 2026 | Operating |
| Giant Dipper | Santa Cruz Beach Boardwalk | United States | May 17, 1924 | May 5, 2007 | Operating |
| Giant Dipper | Belmont Park | United States | July 4, 1925 | April 23, 2010 | Operating |
| Grand National | Pleasure Beach Resort | United Kingdom | 1935 | July 2, 2024 | Operating |
| The Great American Revolution | Six Flags Magic Mountain | United States | May 8, 1976 | June 16, 2002 | Operating |
| Great American Scream Machine | Six Flags Over Georgia | United States | March 31, 1973 | May 21, 2017 | Operating |
| Jack Rabbit | Seabreeze Amusement Park | United States | May 31, 1920 | August 15, 2015 | Operating |
| Jack Rabbit | Kennywood | United States | June 18, 1920 | June 21, 2010 | Operating |
| Kiddy Coaster | Playland | United States | May 26, 1928 | July 28, 2018 | Operating |
| Leap-The-Dips | Lakemont Park | United States | June 2, 1902 | May 26, 2002 | SBNO since 2023 |
| Legend | Arnolds Park | United States | June 8, 1930 (as Speed Hound) | August 6, 2006 | Operating |
| Loch Ness Monster | Busch Gardens Williamsburg | United States | May 20, 1978 | June 17, 2003 | Operating |
| Magnum XL-200 | Cedar Point | United States | May 6, 1989 | June 21, 2004 | Operating |
| Matterhorn Bobsleds | Disneyland | United States | June 14, 1959 | Not yet presented (Note: ACE approved Matterhorn Bobsleds' Roller Coaster Landmark status in 2003, but since the park is reluctant to display the Roller Coaster Landmark plaque, it has not yet been presented.) | Operating |
| Montaña Rusa | La Feria de Chapultepec | Mexico | October 24, 1964 | April 22, 2017 | Demolished in 2022 |
| MonteZOOMa: The Forbidden Fortress | Knott's Berry Farm | United States | May 21, 1978 (as Montezooma's Revenge) (Note: Montezooma's Revenge underwent an extensive refurbishment between 2022 and 2026. The ride's original trains, launch system, and track were replaced. The roller coaster reopened on August 6, 2026, under a new name.) | June 20, 2019 | Operating |
| Phoenix | Knoebels Amusement Resort | United States | 1948 (as The Rocket); relocated 1985 | October 8, 2005 | Operating |
| Racer | Kennywood | United States | April 17, 1927 | June 21, 2010 | Operating |
| The Racer | Kings Island | United States | April 29, 1972 | June 18, 2007 | Operating |
| Racer 75 | Kings Dominion | United States | May 8, 1975 (as Rebel Yell) | June 20, 2003 | Operating |
| The Raven | Holiday World & Splashin' Safari | United States | May 6, 1995 | June 23, 2016 | Operating |
| The Riddler Mindbender | Six Flags Over Georgia | United States | March 31, 1978 (as Mind Bender) | June 17, 2008 | Operating |
| Rodelbaan | Attractiepark de Waarbeek | Netherlands | 1930 | October 24, 2026 | Operating |
| Roller Coaster | Lagoon | United States | May 28, 1921 | July 30, 2005 | Operating |
| Runaway Mine Train | Six Flags Over Texas | United States | July 23, 1966 | September 9, 2006 | Operating |
| Rutschebanen | Tivoli Gardens | Denmark | June 12, 1914 | June 30, 2023 | Operating |
| Screamin' Eagle | Mid America Adventure | United States | April 10, 1976 | June 21, 2016 | Operating |
| Sea Dragon | Columbus Zoo and Aquarium | United States | 1956 (as Jet Flyer) | July 16, 2022 | Operating |
| Shock Wave | Six Flags Over Texas | United States | April 22, 1978 | April 26, 2025 | SBNO since 2026 |
| Swamp Fox | Family Kingdom Amusement Park | United States | June 17, 1966 | April 29, 2016 | Operating |
| Thunderbolt | Kennywood | United States | May 4, 1924 (as Pippin); rebuilt 1968 | July 27, 2014 | Operating |
| Thunderbolt | Six Flags New England | United States | 1941 (as Cyclone) | August 2, 2008 | Operating |
| Thunderhawk | Dorney Park & Wildwater Kingdom | United States | March 30, 1924 (as The Coaster) | June 23, 2021 | Operating |
| Tornado | Adventureland | United States | July 4, 1978 | August 17, 2024 | Operating |
| Vuoristorata | Linnanmäki | Finland | July 13, 1951 | July 19, 2025 | Operating |
| Whizzer | Six Flags Great America | United States | May 29, 1976 (as Willard's Whizzer) | August 10, 2012 | Operating |
| The Wild One | Six Flags America | United States | May 26, 1917 (as The Giant Coaster); rebuilt 1932, 1963; relocated 1986 | June 18, 2018 | SBNO since 2025 |
| Wildcat | Lake Compounce | United States | April 1927 | August 1, 2008 | Operating |
| Wooden Roller Coaster | Playland | Canada | 1958 | July 11, 2009 | Operating |
| Yankee Cannonball | Canobie Lake Park | United States | 1930 (as Meteor); relocated 1936 | June 20, 2013 | Operating |

=== ACE Centennial Coaster ===
In 2025, ACE introduced the Centennial Coaster award to celebrate operating roller coasters that have reached the age of 100 years, counting from the date the ride first opened to the public.

The amusement park or theme park operating a roller coaster that receives the Centennial Coaster award is presented with a custom circular plaque, featuring the name of the roller coaster and its opening year, and the text "Centennial Coaster – Over a Century of Thrills" along its rim.

ACE Centennial Coaster designation is awarded to any roller coaster that meets the age-related criterion, regardless of whether the roller coaster holds Roller Coaster Landmark and/or Coaster Classic status. As of October 2026, there are 9 operating roller coasters in the world that are at least 100 years old.

| Coaster | Park | Country | Opened | Awarded | Status |
|---|---|---|---|---|---|
| Scenic Railway | Luna Park | Australia | December 13, 1912 | Not yet presented | Operating |
| Rutschebanen | Tivoli Gardens | Denmark | June 12, 1914 | Not yet presented | Operating |
| Jack Rabbit | Seabreeze Amusement Park | United States | May 31, 1920 | June 27, 2026 | Operating |
| Jack Rabbit | Kennywood | United States | June 18, 1920 | August 8, 2026 | Operating |
| Roller Coaster | Lagoon | United States | May 28, 1921 | Not yet presented | Operating |
| Thunderhawk | Dorney Park & Wildwater Kingdom | United States | March 30, 1924 | Not yet presented | Operating |
| Thunderbolt | Kennywood | United States | May 4, 1924 | Not yet presented | Operating |
| Giant Dipper | Santa Cruz Beach Boardwalk | United States | May 17, 1924 | Not yet presented | Operating |
| Giant Dipper | Belmont Park | United States | July 4, 1925 | August 12, 2025 | Operating |

=== Golden Age Coaster ===
The Golden Age Coaster award was established to recognize significant roller coasters built during the 1920s—the so-called "golden age" of roller coaster construction. In 2000, the recognition was renamed the Roller Coaster Landmark award, enabling ACE to also recognize historically significant roller coasters that were not built in the 1920s.

Giant Dipper at Santa Cruz Beach Boardwalk, and Giant Dipper at Belmont Park both received the Golden Age Coaster award in addition to the later Roller Coaster Landmark award.

== Preservation ==
ACE takes an active role in the preservation of endangered roller coasters. Since 1985, the club has either directly or indirectly helped save more than half a dozen. One of the most notable include Phoenix located at Knoebels Amusement Resort in Elysburg, Pennsylvania. The wooden coaster was relocated from Playland Park in San Antonio, Texas. Another that the organization saved was Leap the Dips, the world's oldest operating roller coaster, located at Lakemont Park in Altoona, Pennsylvania. In addition to preservation, some parks have also sought the opinions of ACE members regarding roller coaster installations, such as Magnum XL-200 at Cedar Point and roller coaster design, as was the case with The Legend and The Voyage at Holiday World in Santa Claus, Indiana.

== Documenting ==
ACE maintains ACE Digital Archives, a platform dedicated to preserving roller coaster history, historical publications, and member-submitted archival materials.

As part of its mission of promoting history and knowledge of roller coasters, ACE has produced two video documentaries: The Legacy of Arrow Development (2016) about now-defunct American roller coaster manufacturer Arrow Development (later Arrow Dynamics); and The Legacy of Schwarzkopf (2024) about German roller coaster engineer Anton Schwarzkopf and his company Schwarzkopf Industries.
