= Big Dipper (Camden Park) =

Wooden roller coaster

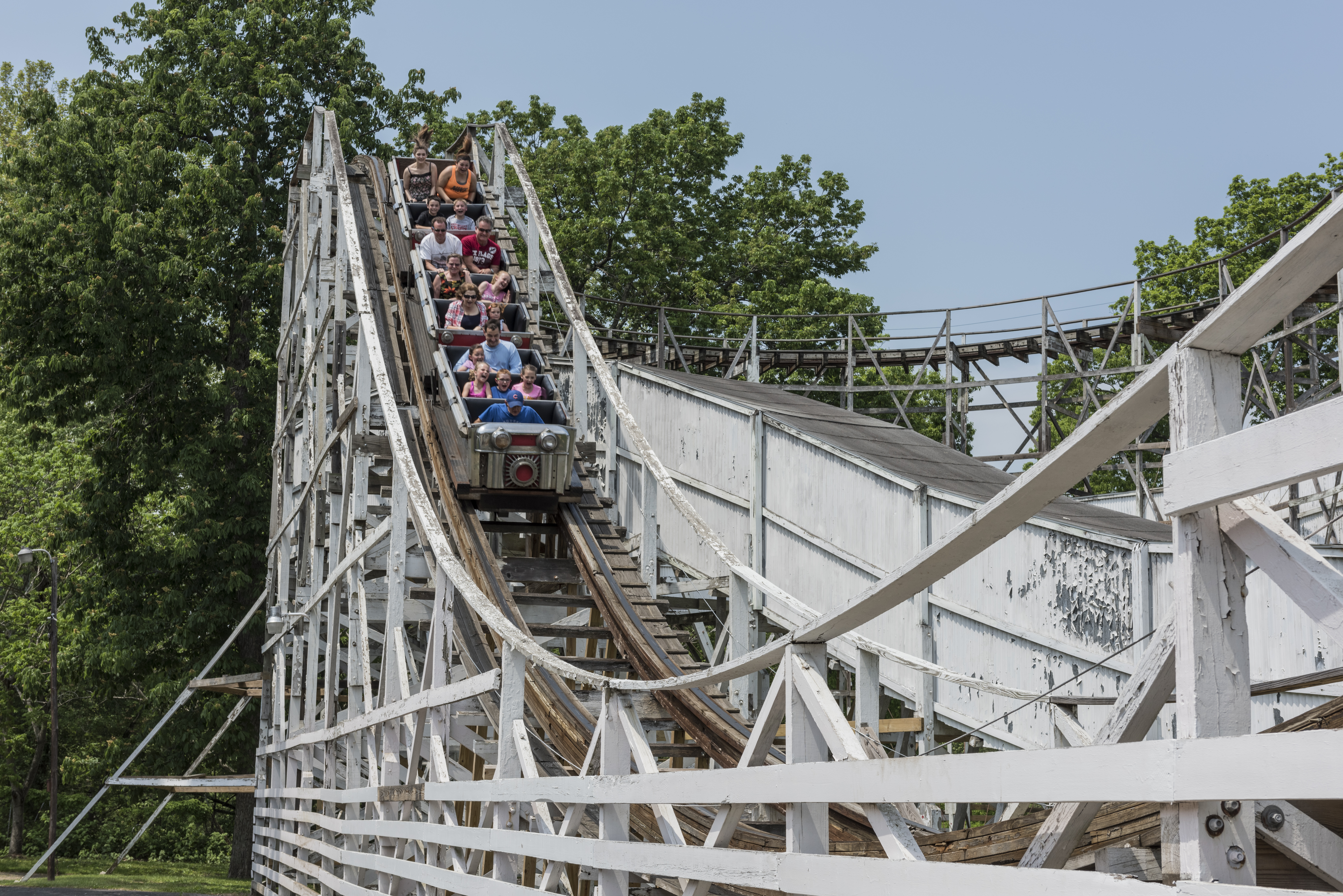

Camden Park
- Location: Camden Park
- Coordinates: 38°23′49″N 82°31′54″W
- Status: Operating
- Opening date: 1958

General statistics
- Manufacturer: National Amusement Devices
- Duration: 1:40
- Big Dipper at RCDB

The Big Dipper is a wooden roller coaster located at Camden Park in Huntington, West Virginia, United States. Manufactured by National Amusement Devices, the ride opened in 1958 and is both the largest and oldest roller coaster in West Virginia.

== History ==
The Big Dipper was conceived when Camden Park owner, John Boylin, wanted to replace the park's side friction coaster, Roller Coaster. Roller Coaster closed in 1957 and was swiftly replaced with Big Dipper, which opened the following year.

On May 12, 2019, American Coaster Enthusiasts designated the Big Dipper as a Coaster Landmark.

As of July 2024, it is one of only three roller coasters manufactured by National Amusement Devices to still be operating, with the other two being Little Dipper at the same park, and Wildcat at Frontier City.

== Ride experience ==
Upon departing the station, the train turns right and ascends the 50-foot (15 m) chain lift hill. At the crest of the lift, the train descends briefly before climbing into a banked left turn leading to the ride's main drop. The train then crests a hill and curves left over the station, followed by a second major descent into an enclosed tunnel. Within the tunnel, the train navigates a turn before traversing two successive camelback hills, after which it enters a manual brake run to conclude the circuit. A complete ride cycle has a duration of approximately one minute and forty seconds.

== Popular culture ==
The Big Dipper is featured in the video game Fallout 76, in Camden Park's location as the 'Widow Maker'.
