= The Great Scenic Railway =

Wooden roller coaster in Australia

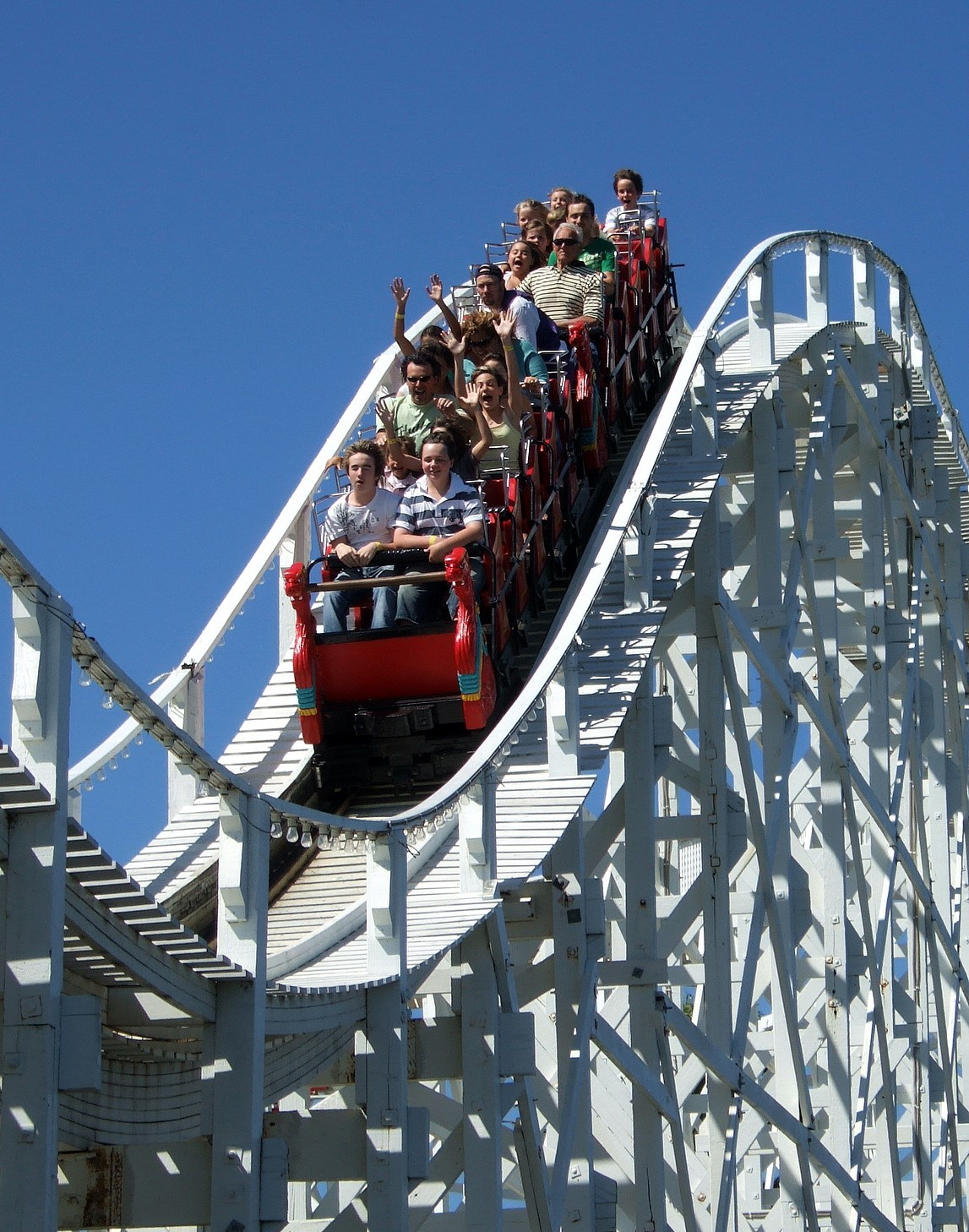

Luna Park Melbourne
- Location: Luna Park Melbourne
- Coordinates: 37.8678°S 144.9765°E
- Status: Operating
- Opening date: 13 December 1912

General statistics
- Type: Wood
- Manufacturer: LaMarcus Adna Thompson
- Lift/launch system: Cable lift hill
- Height: 16 m (52 ft)
- Length: 967 m (3,173 ft)
- Speed: 60 km/h (37 mph)
- Inversions: 0
- Height restriction: 100 cm (3 ft 3 in)
- Trains: 3 trains with 2 cars; riders arranged 2 across in 5 rows for a total of 20 riders per train
- Website: Official website
- The Great Scenic Railway at RCDB

The Great Scenic Railway is a heritage-listed wooden roller coaster located at Luna Park Melbourne in Melbourne, Australia. As of 2026, it is the oldest operating roller coaster in the world. (Note: As of 2026, Leap-The-Dips, the oldest roller coaster in the world, has been suspended since 2023. This makes the Great Scenic Railway currently the world's oldest operating roller coaster.) The ride is one of only five roller coasters remaining that requires a brakeman to stand on the train.

The ride opened on 13 December 1912 with the opening of Luna Park Melbourne, and has remained continuously in use since, making it the oldest continuously operating roller coaster. The ride was originally built with 65,674 metres (215,466 ft) of Canadian Oregon pine, and is regarded as an ACE Classic Coaster.

The Great Scenic Railway, Luna Park Sydney’s Wild Mouse and Sea World's Leviathan are the only three operating wooden roller coasters in Australia.

== Characteristics ==
The Great Scenic Railway is a 967 metres (3,173 ft) long coaster which has a height of 16 metres (52 ft) and a top speed of 60 kilometres per hour (37 mph). A brakeman is required in order to brake the roller coaster.

The roller coaster has three trains with two cars. Each car can sit up to 10 riders, although only 8 are used in the rear carriage. Each train weighs about 2 tonnes (2.2 short tons).

== Ride experience ==
The roller coaster begins by entering a cable lift hill. It then reaches its highest point, travelling above Luna Park's entrance before the first drop. The ride's layout circles the perimeter of the park twice, the first circumnavigation featuring large drops and tunnels. The second pass around the park features significantly smaller drop heights, and lower speeds.

== See also ==
- Leap-The-Dips – United States historic place
- List of heritage-listed buildings in Melbourne
