= Scenic railway (roller coaster design) =

Type of amusement ride

A scenic railway is an early roller coaster design that features a simple and shallow out-and-back layout, and trains with only road wheels. It usually requires a brakeman to ride on the train and slow it if needed. Their name derives from the fact that they are often adorned with elaborate façades. The ride type was first introduced by LaMarcus Adna Thompson, whose company, L.A. Thompson Scenic Railway Company, built several of them.

== History ==
Gravity railroads in the United States were used primarily to transport harvested coal out of mines and down mountains, often to the nearest river or canal. The Mauch Chunk Switchback Railway in eastern Pennsylvania was constructed in 1827 and was the second of its kind in the country. Before long, tourists attracted to the novelty of the railway were offered rides on it. Passengers enjoyed panoramic views along the descent, which started at a leisurely 5 mph (8.0 km/h) but could reach speeds up to 65 mph (105 km/h). The Mauch Chunk Switchback Railway and similar gravity railroads served as the inspiration for the scenic railway. The commercial success of these amusement rides inspired future advancements in what would eventually evolve into the modern-day roller coaster.

Inspired by the Mauch Chunk Switchback Railway, inventor and businessman LaMarcus Adna Thompson built upon earlier ride patents for incomplete concepts never constructed and developed his own patent, known as Switchback Railway. The first installation opened as the Gravity Pleasure Switchback Railway at Coney Island in 1884. It was the first true roller coaster in the United States. The ride was immensely popular and inspired many more rides similar to it to be built elsewhere. These rides served as the precursor to the side-friction roller coaster.

The power and setup requirements of the traveling versions often resulted in carriers of the rides to use a special Showman's engine with an additional dynamo and a crane mounted on an enlarged coal bunker. The space in the middle of the traveling versions was commonly decorated with a waterfall and an organ.

== Current installations ==
- Scenic Railway at Luna Park in Melbourne, Australia. Built in 1912, it is the oldest continuously operating roller coaster in the world, and the oldest roller coaster in Australia.
- Rutschebanen at Tivoli Gardens in Copenhagen, Denmark. Built by Denmark native Valdemar Lebech in 1914.
- Scenic Railway at Dreamland Margate in Kent, England. Opened in 1920, Scenic Railway was granted Grade II listed status in the United Kingdom by English Heritage. As of 2026, the ride is permanently closed, but it remains standing.
- Hullámvasút at Zoo Budapest in Budapest, Hungary. Built in 1922, but did not open to the public until 1926. The ride has not operated since November 2015, but remains standing.
- Montaña Suiza at Parque de Atracciones Monte Igueldo in San Sebastián, Spain. Built by Erich Heidrich in 1928. Oldest operating steel roller coaster in the world.
- Roller Coaster at Great Yarmouth Pleasure Beach in Norfolk, England. Initially built by Erich Heidrich for the Colonial Exhibition in Paris in 1929. Moved to Great Yarmouth in 1932.
- Rutschebanen at Dyrehavsbakken in Lyngby-Taarbæk, Denmark. Built by Valdemar Lebech in 1932.
- Hochschaubahn at Wurstelprater in Vienna, Austria. Opened in 1950 as a replacement for the original ride of the same name, which was destroyed during World War II.
- Vuoristorata at Linnanmäki in Helsinki, Finland. Built by Valdemar Lebech in 1951. Still features the original wooden trains operated by brakemen.
