= Side-friction roller coaster =

Type of amusement ride

A side-friction roller coaster is an early wooden roller coaster design invented by Edward Joy Morris. The design introduced side-friction wheels to help prevent trains from derailing during curved portions of the track. In addition to weight-bearing road wheels traditionally located on the underside of each train car, friction wheels were added to both sides to run along the inner edges of the track.

The first side-friction coasters appeared in the late 19th century and were generally mild in comparison to modern roller coasters. They declined in popularity in the 1920s as newer coasters began incorporating a third set of wheels, known as upstop wheels, which further improved safety and allowed for more thrilling track designs than side-friction designs allowed.

== History ==
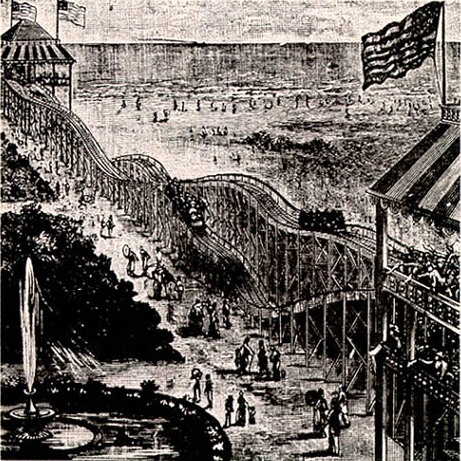
L. A. Thompson's Switchback Railway in 1884

Inspired by the Mauch Chunk Switchback Railway, inventor and businessman LaMarcus Adna Thompson developed his own patent for a ride called Switchback Railway. The first such installation opened as the Gravity Pleasure Switchback Railway at Coney Island in 1884 as the first roller coaster in the United States. Scenic railway roller coasters inspired by this one became popular across the country in the years that followed.

In 1894, Edward Joy Morris took the concept one step further with the invention of side-friction wheels. Patented as Figure Eight Toboggan Slide, the design used weight-bearing road wheels beneath each car and friction wheels on both sides. The friction wheels were mounted perpendicular to the road wheels and ran against the side rails, making derailment less likely.

Side-friction coasters could achieve greater speeds than scenic railways, especially around curves, which led to thrill-inducing lateral g-forces. The more secure design enabled coasters to operate without a brakeman, who had previously been required to ride along and slow the train at various points along the track. Instead, operators in the loading station used a hand-operated friction brake to stop the train when it returned.

Morris formed the Morris Chute Company, which manufactured carousels and roller coasters. More than 250 side-friction roller coasters (also known as figure eight roller coasters and toboggans) were installed across the United States, but only one is left standing today. Leap-The-Dips opened in 1902 at Lakemont Park in Altoona, Pennsylvania, and is the last remaining side-friction roller coaster in the world, though it has not operated since 2023. Like other early wooden coasters, Leap-The-Dips offered a relatively mild ride compared with modern roller coasters.

In 1903, Morris sold the company, which reemerged in 1904 as the Philadelphia Toboggan Company. By the 1920s, side-friction coasters were being superseded by designs incorporating upstop wheels, which allowed for faster and more thrilling rides. Introduced in 1920 by John A. Miller, the newer design added a third set of wheels running beneath the track, further preventing derailment and paving the way for even faster speeds, steeper drops, and newer elements in track design, such as the airtime hill.
