= Stricker's Grove =

Amusement park in Ross, Ohio

- Interactive map of Stricker's Grove
- Location: Ross, Ohio, U.S.
- Coordinates: 39°17′43″N 84°40′09″W
- Opened: 1924
- Owner: Stricker Family, Stricker's Grove Management LLC.
- Slogan: A park for families and children.
- Operating season: Closed to the public most of the year
- Area: 25 acres (10 ha)

Attractions
- Total: 17
- Roller coasters: 2
- Water rides: 0
- Website: strickersgrove.com

Stricker's Grove is a family owned amusement park located in Ross, Ohio, USA. Unlike other amusement parks, Stricker's Grove is closed to the public for most of the year. Instead, it is rented out for private functions, such as weddings. The park is open to the public for eight days of every year: on July 4, four days in mid-July for the Hamilton County 4-H Community Fair, the second Sunday in August (Family Day), Labor Day, and a Sunday in October called "Customer Appreciation Day."

== History ==
The park was started in 1924 in Mt. Healthy, Ohio by Henry Stricker on 55 acres (22 ha) of property next to the Drive-in on Compton Rd. The Strickers lived in a house on the property. Henry Stricker initially used the land for a place for coworkers to come to on weekends to picnic and enjoy the countryside. A dance hall was later added and was designed so that if the park failed, it could be converted into a chicken coop.

In the 1940s, a pony cart ride was added along with a horse and pony track. The first rides arrived at the park in 1954, including the Boat Ride and the Rockets, both of which remain in operation.

Upon Henry's death in 1960, the park was passed on to his three sons, Harold, Elmer, and Ralph. In 1972, the park was relocated to Ross, Ohio, and Ralph became the sole owner. Ralph died in January 2007. His daughter Debbie and three longtime employees now operate the park.

== Rides and attractions ==
Stricker's Grove currently has several amusement rides, including two "classic" wooden roller coasters.

=== Tornado ===
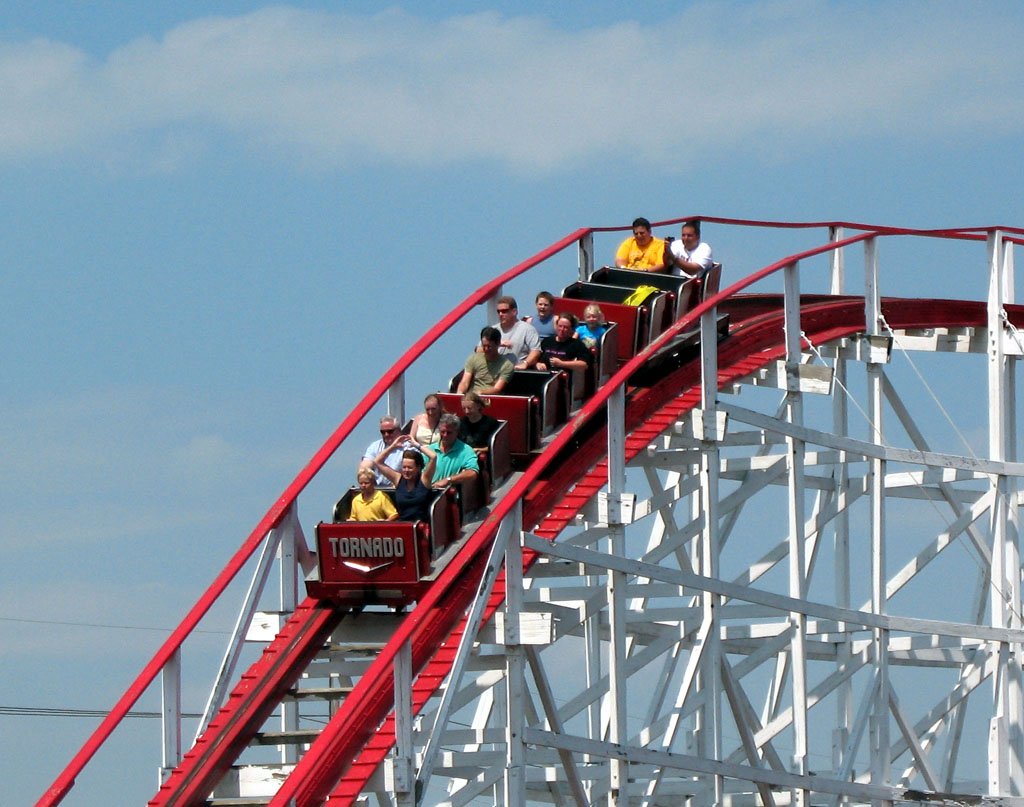
Tornado roller coaster

The larger of the roller coasters is Tornado, designed by Al Collins and built by Ralph Stricker. The ride started construction in 1990 and opened in 1993. The ride runs a single Philadelphia Toboggan Coasters train. The Tornado is a mirror image of the former John C. Allen-designed Jet Coaster (later known as the Mighty Lightnin' and the Comet) at the now-defunct Rocky Glen Park in Moosic, Pennsylvania.

it goes 45 miles per hour.

=== Teddy Bear ===
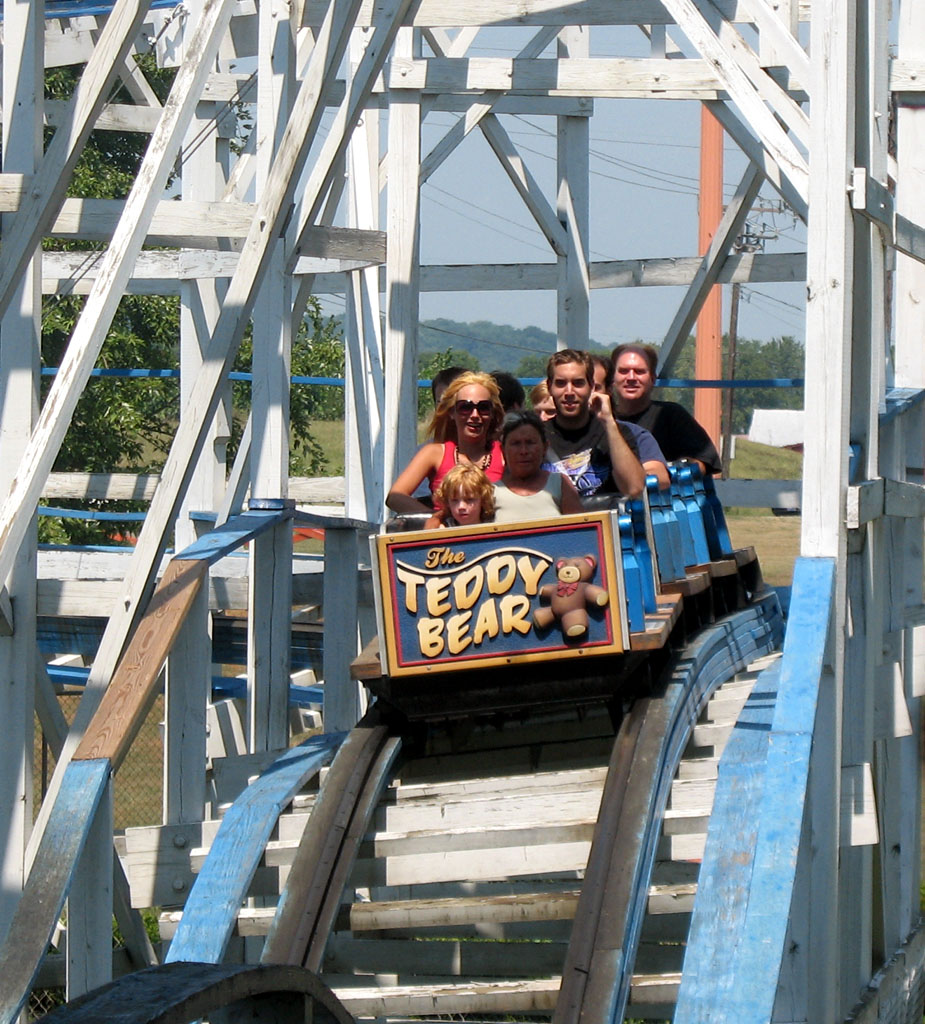
Teddy Bear roller coaster

The "Teddy Bear" wooden roller coaster is a small, family-sized ride first built in 1996, also by Ralph Stricker. Like the Tornado, the Teddy Bear coaster was built using the blueprints from the 1935-built Teddy Bear at Coney Island in Cincinnati, Ohio. The coaster has been recognized as an ACE Classic Coaster.

=== Other attractions ===
- Boat Ride
- Rockets
- Little Cars
- Kiddie Whip
- Kiddie Turtles (a kiddie-sized Tumble Bug)
- Carousel
- Train ride
- Ferris wheel
- Tilt-A-Whirl
- Scrambler
- Flying Scooters
- Electric Rainbow (Round Up)
- Miniature golf
- Pirate ship
- Elephants
- Tip Top

=== Former rides ===
- Kiddie Coaster (a 13 foot tall purple kiddie coaster)
- Crazy Daisy (a Philadelphia Toboggan Company miniature "Cuddle-Up" ride)
- Helicopters
- Topsy Turvy
- Freefall

== Pictures ==
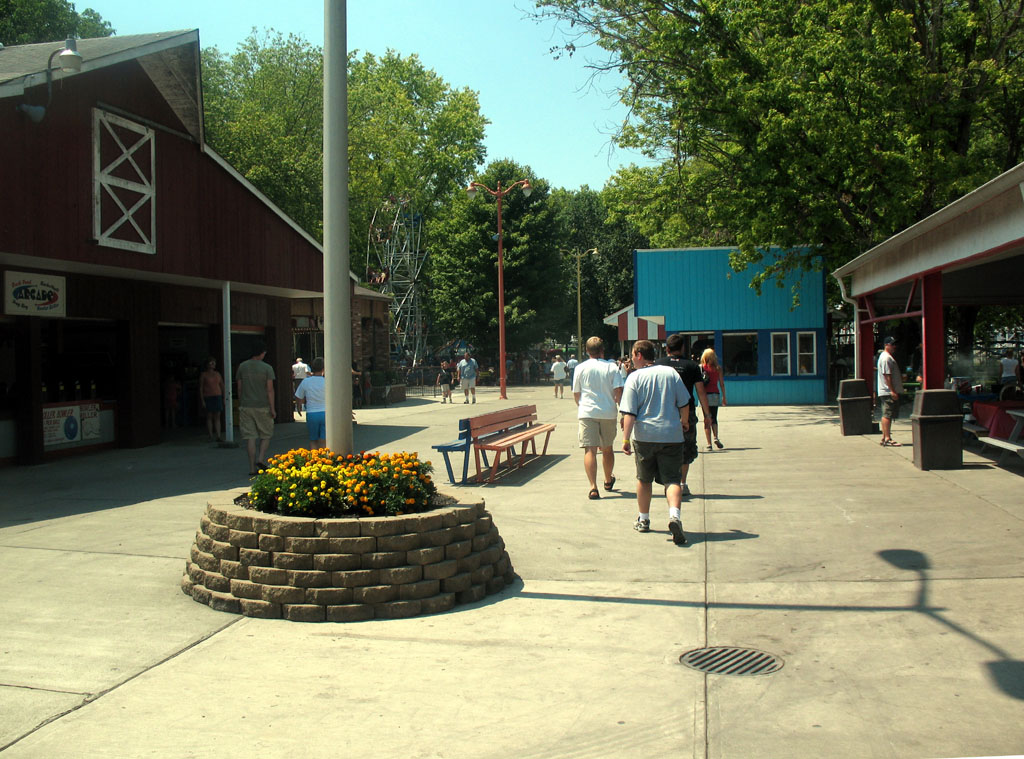
Inside the park

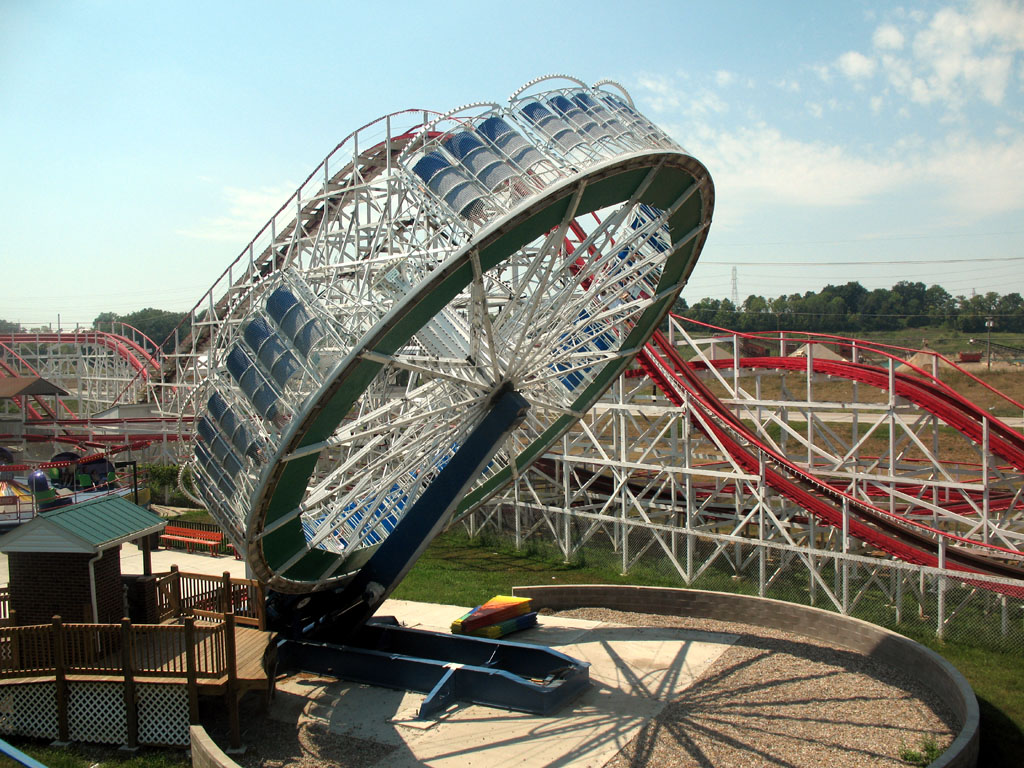
Electric Rainbow (Round Up)

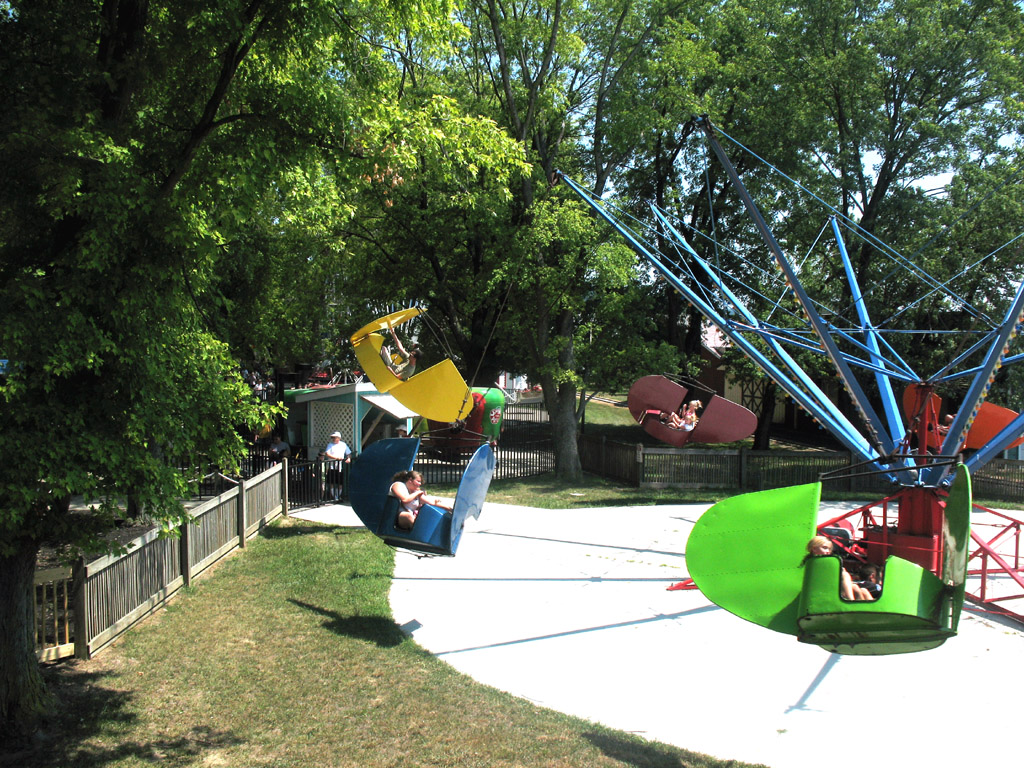
Flying Scooters

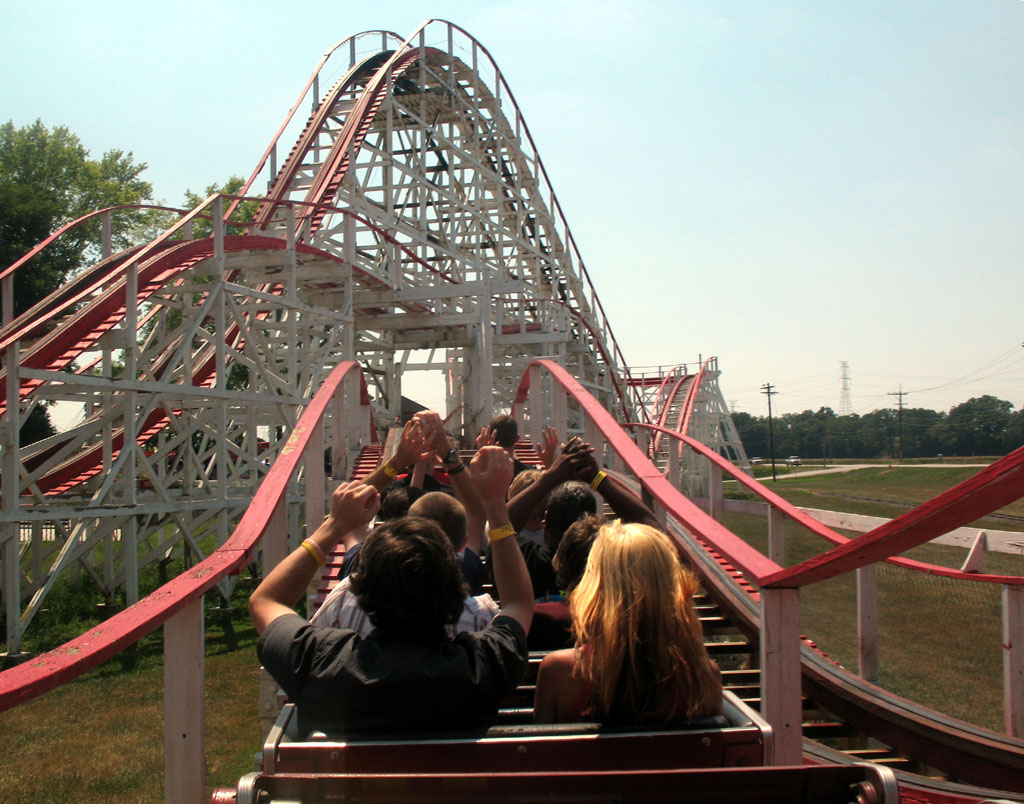
Tornado roller coaster
