= Exclusive ride time =

Exclusive event at amusement parks

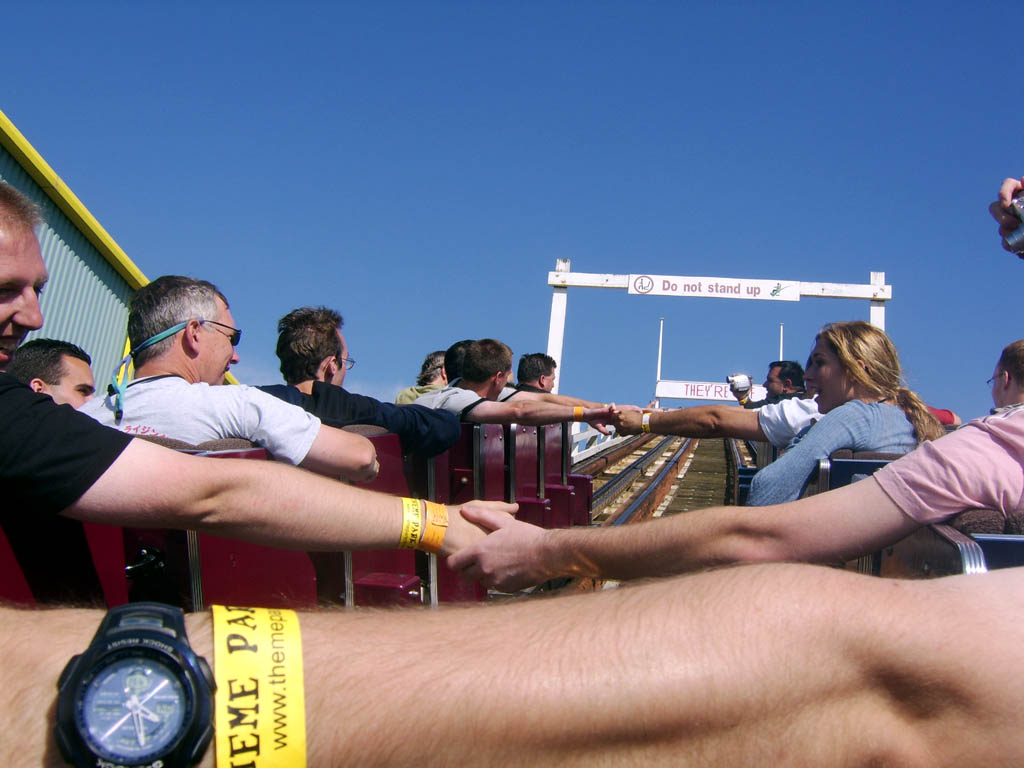
An exclusive ride time session on Grand National at Blackpool Pleasure Beach in 2006

Exclusive ride time (ERT) is a period of time set aside by an amusement park to allow exclusive access to one or more attractions to a specific group of park guests. Sessions are usually scheduled outside of a park's normal operating hours, although designated attractions may also be closed off to the public during the ERT period. Exclusive ride time is often reserved for private corporate events, celebrity functions, season passholders, special ticketed events, members of the media, or amusement park enthusiast groups such American Coaster Enthusiasts.

In the past, Disney parks branded exclusive ride time as Extra Magic Hours, offered to guests staying in an on-site resort. Guests were given early access to the park or allowed to stay past normal operating hours to visit a limited number of attractions that operated during the period. This feature was retired in January 2021 in American parks and replaced with an option that only allows early entry. It remains operative at Disneyland Paris with the revised name of Moments de Magie en Plus (Extra Magic Time), as there is only a single hour of extra ride time now, compared to multiple hours in the past.
