= Lakemont Park =

Amusement park in Altoona, Pennsylvania

- Previously known as Boyertown USA

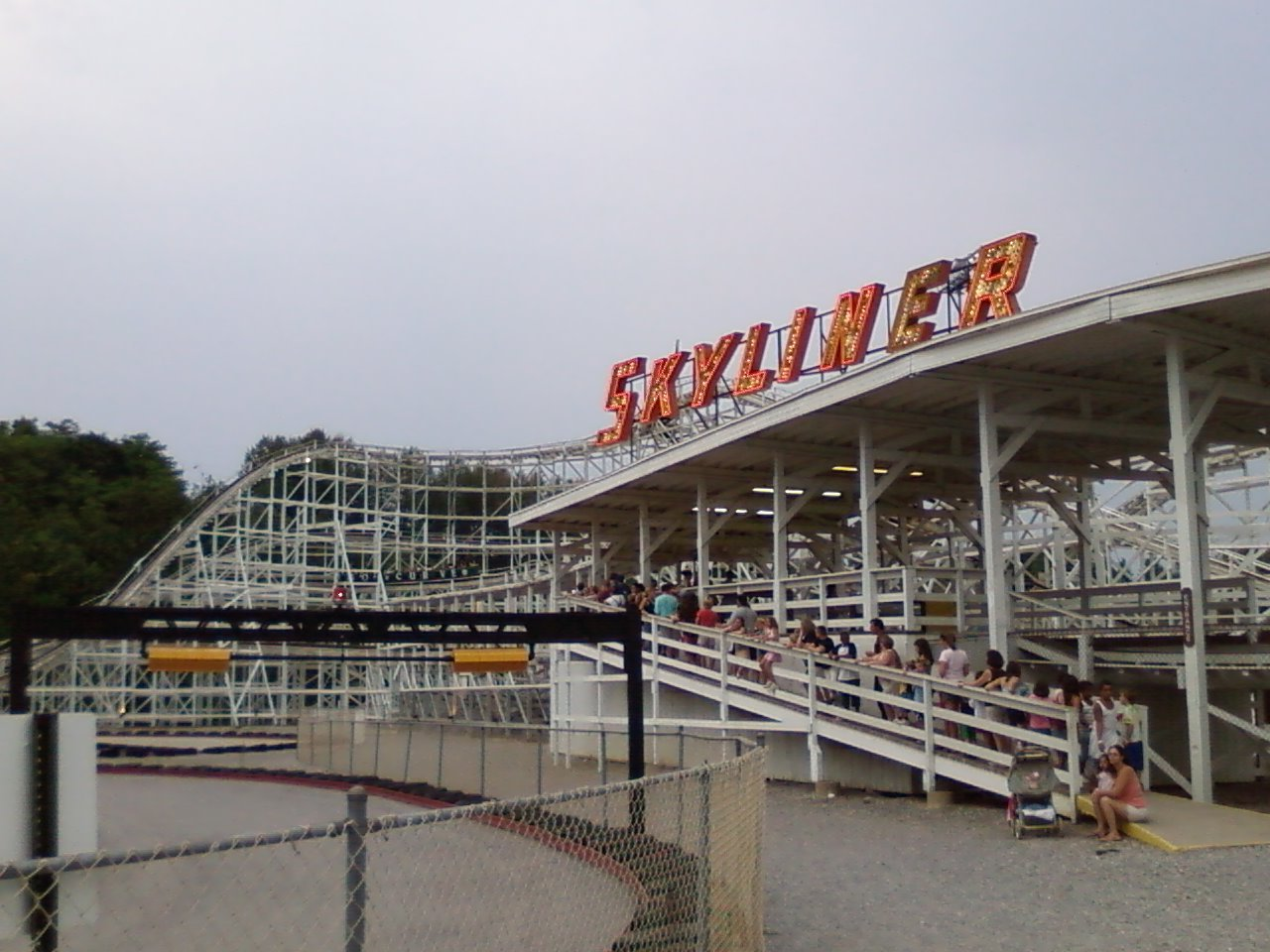
- Skyliner roller coaster
- Interactive map of Lakemont Park
- Location: Altoona, Pennsylvania, US
- Coordinates: 40.4717632°N 78.3954871°W
- Status: Operating
- Opened: 1894
- Owner: Lakemont Park Center, LLC
- Slogan: "Two great parks, twice the fun!"
- Operating season: May through Labor Day
- Area: 60 acres (24 ha)

Attractions
- Total: 15
- Roller coasters: 2
- Water rides: 0
- Website: Official website

Lakemont Park is an amusement park located in Altoona, Pennsylvania, United States. The park opened in 1894 as a trolley park and later added its first rides in 1899. It is the eighth oldest amusement park in the US and one of only thirteen still in operation that first opened as a trolley park. The park closed from 2017 to 2018 and reopened in 2019. Lakemont Park's amusement rides have been inactive since 2024.

Among Lakemont Park's most notable attractions is Leap-The-Dips, the world's oldest surviving roller coaster, which first opened in 1902. The historic coaster was designated a National Historic Landmark in 1996. During the winter holiday season, the park offers a drive-through holiday light display spanning 51 acres (21 ha), which operates from November through January.

== History ==
Lakemont Park opened in 1894 as a trolley park and later transformed into an amusement park when the first ride was added in 1899. It was donated to Blair County in 1937. The Boyer Candy Company purchased the park on May 23, 1986, and renamed it Boyertown USA. It was sold again on July 1, 1988, and remained in continuous operation through 2016.

Lakemont Park closed for the 2017 season, as many rides and attractions were undergoing maintenance. In 2018, Lakemont Park announced that it would remain closed for the season, with plans to reopen as a "family entertainment location with some amusements" in the summer of 2019. The park sold a lot of its former rides and attractions and successfully reopened in the summer of 2019. The park indefinitely ceased operations of their amusement rides in 2024 citing declining attendance and high insurance costs.

=== Lease dispute with Blair County (2025) ===
On August 29, 2025, the Lakemont Partnership, the organization leasing and operating Lakemont Park, filed a lawsuit against the Blair County Commissioners, alleging false accusations of lease violations and reputational harm. The lawsuit claims the county has threatened to end the partnership's lease, which runs through 2066. Additionally, the lawsuit reveals an offer of $800,000 from a sports complex to buy the lease from the partnership. The amount is much less than the millions of dollars in capital investments and debt the partnership hopes to recoup. The controversy stems from the park's recent closure of rides. The lease states the partnership must maintain the property as a public park and preserve the Casino, the Leap-The-Dips roller coaster, flower gardens, and memorials "as long as it is economically feasible". The partnership claims it "[continues] to meet its obligations under the lease" and needs "the court's guidance". According to the lawsuit, it is no longer financially feasible to operate the rides. In 2019, after partnership spent $2 million in upgrades, the COVID-19 pandemic caused the park to temporarily close. The lawsuit claims those significant expenditures followed by a cancelled season made it "difficult or impossible" to continue to maintain the rides.

== Rides and other attractions ==
Lakemont Park has several outdoor attractions.

=== Attractions ===
- Four batting cages
- 18-hole Keystone Falls Mini Golf
- 18-hole Rabbit Hole Mini Golf
- Four basketball courts
- Two volleyball courts
- Pavilions
- Playground

=== Roller coasters ===
Lakemont Park's roller coasters have been inactive since 2024.

| Ride | Manufacturer | Opened | Operational status | Description |
|---|---|---|---|---|
| Leap-The-Dips | Federal Construction Company | 1902 | Closed since 2023 | A wooden side-friction roller coaster with three four-seat cars. It is the last surviving side-friction coaster. Leap-The-Dips features 1,452 feet (443 m) of track and is 41 feet tall, with a largest drop of nine feet. The ride was closed for all but two weeks in 2005, because of maintenance. The ride was also closed from 1986 to 1998. |
| Skyliner | Philadelphia Toboggan Coasters | 1987 | Closed since 2023 | A wooden roller coaster. Skyliner was relocated from Roseland Park in Canandaigua, New York, where it was originally built in 1960. It was moved to build up the park for the failed Boyertown USA project. This marks one of the few instances of a wooden roller coaster being moved. |

== Former rides and attractions ==
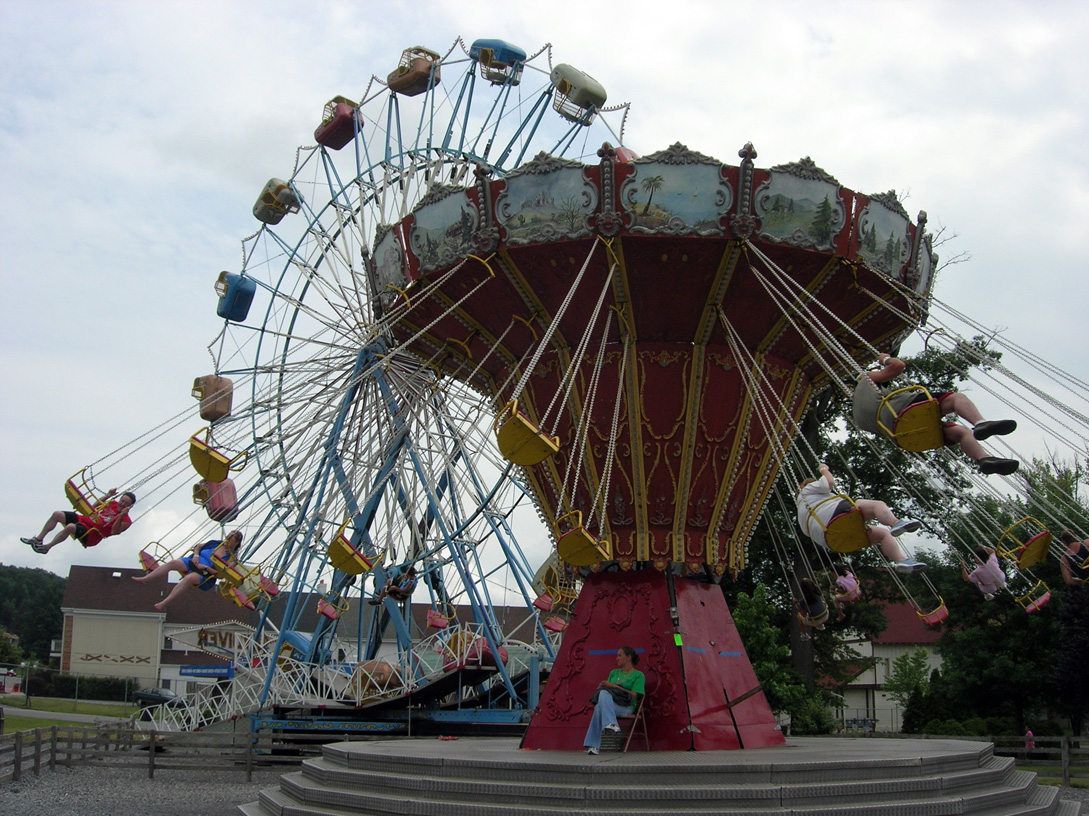
The German Swings, with Skydiver in the background

=== Former roller coasters ===
| Ride | Manufacturer | Opened | Closed | Description | Ref(s) |
|---|---|---|---|---|---|
| Gravity Road | Amandus Sink | 1894 | 1897 | A switchback railroad-style roller coaster built by Amandus Sink. The ride was torn down in 1897. | |
| Twister | Philadelphia Toboggan Company | 1927 | 1935 | A Herbert Schmeck wooden roller coaster. The ride was destroyed in a flood in March of 1935, and was removed a year later. | |
| Toboggan | Chance Rides | 1991 | 2016 | A portable Toboggan coaster. The ride featured four single cars. | |
| Lil' Leaper/Little Leaper | Allan Herschell Company | 1993 | 2023 | A standard Little Dipper kiddie coaster. | |
| Mad Mouse | Allan Herschell Company | 1993 | 2003 | A steel wild mouse coaster. The ride closed in 2003 due to increasing maintenance needs. | |

=== Water park ===
The water park closed in 2020 and has not opened since.

| Ride | Opened | Closed | Description | Ref(s) |
|---|---|---|---|---|
| Paddle Boats | Unknown | Unknown | | |
| Pool | Unknown | 2020 | Three-foot-deep pool | |
| Three water slides | Unknown | 2020 | | |
| Pirate's Cove | Unknown | 2017 | Small pirate ship with water cannons and palm trees | |
| Treehouse Activity Pool | 2019 | 2020 | Treehouse-themed pool with fountains | |

=== Former rides ===
- German Swings
- Tin Lizzy antique cars
- Motorway go-karts
- C.P. Huntington Train
- 4X4 Monster Trucks
- Skydiver

== Incidents at Lakemont Park ==
- On July 23, 1959, 12-year-old Frank Vestri drowned in the swimming pool area, despite a lifeguard having been on duty at the time.
- On September 2, 1991, a 17-year-old ride operator named Chris Whitfield was injured by the Little Leaper coaster. He lost his right leg after it was caught between the train and the lift chain. The accident was featured in a segment entitled "Roller Coaster Rescue" during the 4th season of the television series Rescue 911, which aired on September 29, 1992, on CBS.

== See also ==
- DelGrosso's Park – amusement park in Tipton, Pennsylvania
