= Flying Scooters =

Amusement ride

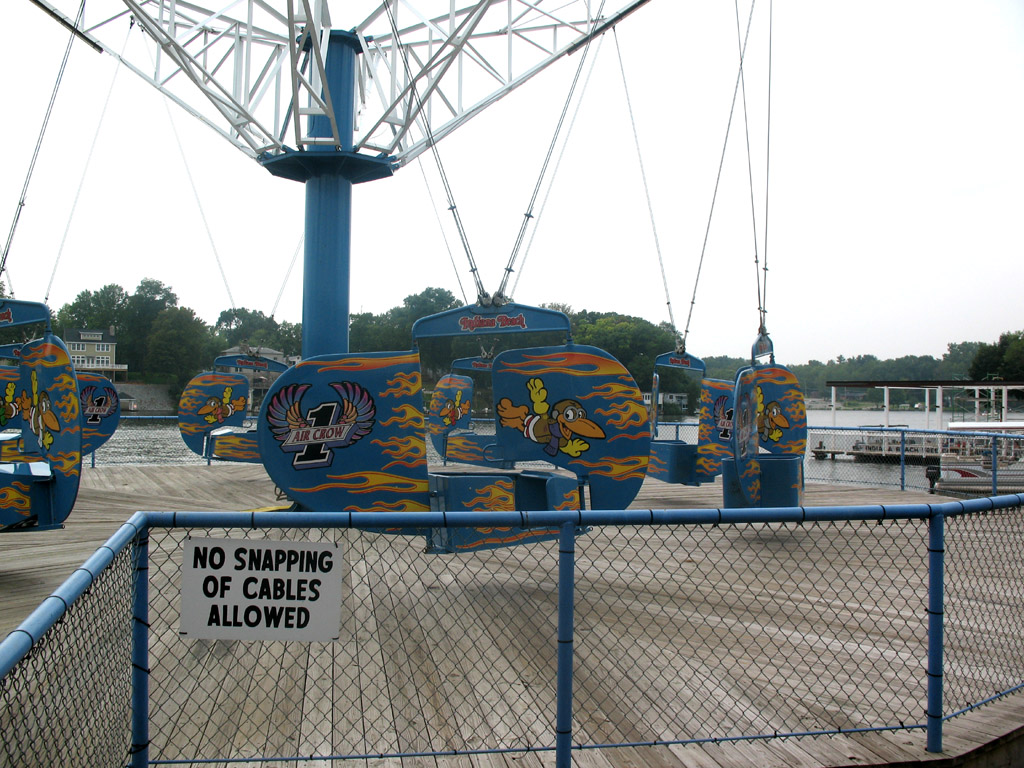
Air Crow at Indiana Beach. Note the "No snapping of cables" sign

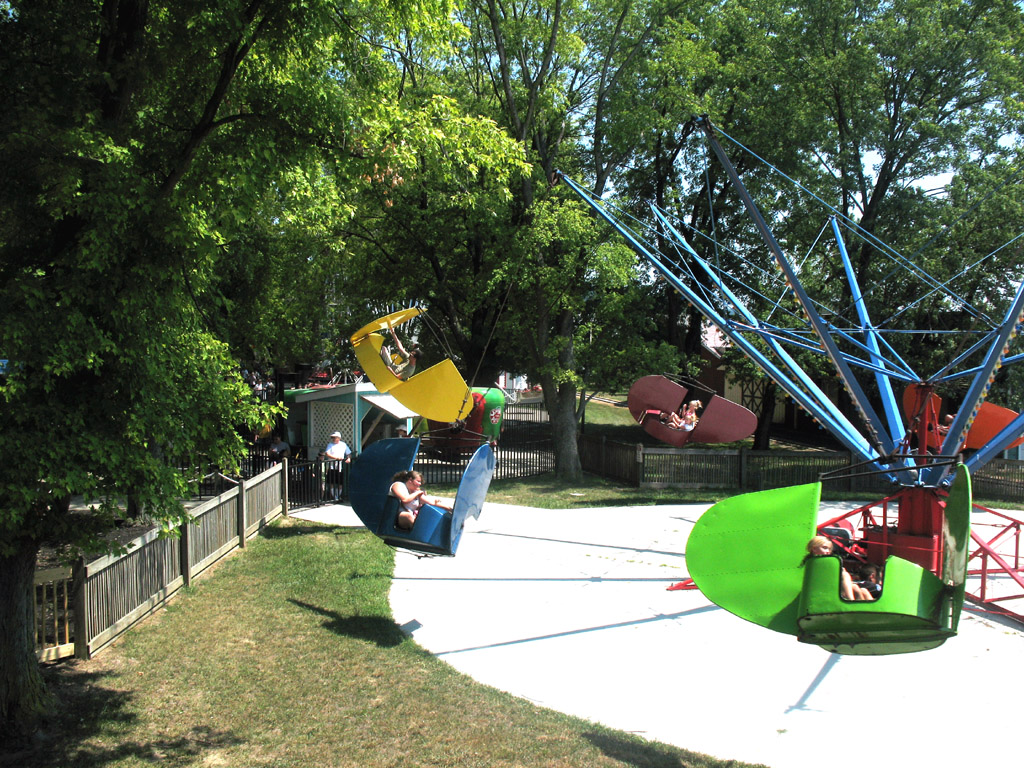
Flyers in operation at Stricker's Grove

Flying Scooters, also known simply as Flyers, is an amusement ride consisting of a center post with ride vehicles suspended from arms attached to the center post. The ride was developed in the 1920s and 1930s by Alvin Bisch and his partner, Ralph Rocco. They applied for a patent for a “Device to train aviators or for amusement purposes” in 1929. The first ride manufactured by the Bisch-Rocco Amusement Company was installed at Riverview Park (Chicago) in 1935.

In the early 2000s, Larson International revived the concept. In the early 2010s, Larson partnered with Majestic Manufacturing, Inc. to create a portable version of the ride.

When the ride is in operation, a motor causes the arms to spin, with centrifugal forces causing the ride vehicles to fly outwards. Each ride vehicle is equipped with a large rudder, allowing riders to control the motion of their vehicle. The minimum rider height requirement is usually 36 inches tall or more.

== Cable snapping ==
Although Flying Scooters are generally considered a mild ride, a skilled rider can "snap" the cables suspending the vehicle, and thus gain a more extreme and out-of-control experience. Snapping is caused by the cables slacking due to quick motions of the vehicle. Snapping is made easier on older and faster Flying Scooters rides such as the Flyer at Knoebels or others manufactured by Bisch-Rocco. Some newer models, such as those manufactured by Larson International, are designed to prevent snapping. Snapping is sometimes discouraged for maintenance and safety reasons, and in the case of some parks, snapping is punishable by the ride cycle being stopped early and the offending rider being removed from the ride.

== Installations ==
Name	Park	Location	Manufacturer	Opened	Status	Ref
Flyer	Knoebels Amusement Resort	United States	Bisch-Rocco	1972	Operating	
Flying Fish	Story Land	United States	Larson International	Unknown	Operating	
Flying Scooter	Bland's Park	United States	Bisch-Rocco	Unknown	Removed	
Flying Scooter	LeSourdsville Lake Amusement Park	United States	Bisch-Rocco	Unknown	Removed	
Flying Scooter	Waldameer & Water World	United States	Bisch-Rocco	1944	Removed	
Flying Scooters	Erieview Park	United States	Bisch-Rocco	Unknown	Removed	
Flying Scooters	Stricker's Grove	United States	Ray Evers	Unknown	Operating	
Hurricane	Lakeside Amusement Park	United States	Bisch-Rocco	Unknown	SBNO	
Flying Scooters	Whalom Park	United States	Bisch-Rocco	Unknown	Removed	
Rowdy Roosters	Canobie Lake Park; Palisades Amusement Park	United States	Bisch-Rocco	Unknown	Operating	
Mission Macaw; Formerly SS Stingray	Rides At Adventure Cove in Columbus Zoo	United States	Larson International	2008	Operating	
Seabreeze Flyers	Seabreeze Amusement Park	United States	Bisch-Rocco	C. 1944	Removed	
Spirit of Kitty Hawk	Frontier Village	United States	Bisch-Rocco	Unknown	Removed	
Falcon Flyer; Flying Circus	Wild Adventures; Celebration City	United States	Larson International	2010; Unknown	Operating	
Aerial Joy Ride	Hersheypark	United States	Spillman Manufacturing	1941	Removed	
Flying Aces	Lagoon Amusement Park	United States	Bisch-Rocco	1941	Operating	
Screaming Eagles	Fun Spot America (Kissimmee)	United States	Larson International	Unknown	Operating	
Dive Bombers	Santa's Workshop	United States	Bisch-Rocco	Unknown	Operating	
Flying Scooter	Bushkill Park	United States	Bisch-Rocco	1950	Removed	
Flying Scooters	Playland Park	United States	Bisch-Rocco	1950	Removed	
Flying Scooters	Geauga Lake	United States	Bisch-Rocco	1958	Removed	
Flying Eagles	Kings Dominion	United States	Bisch-Rocco	1975	Operating	
Eagle's Flight	Holiday World	United States	Bisch-Rocco	1976	Operating	
Flying Scooter	Conneaut Lake Park; Euclid Beach Park; Old Indiana Fun Park	United States	Bisch-Rocco	1997; Unknown; Unknown	Operating	
Flying Eagles	California's Great America	United States	Larson International	2002	Operating	
American Flyers; Formerly Phantom Phlyer	Lake Compounce; Kennywood; West View Park	United States	Bisch-Rocco	2003; 1995 to 1996; 1937 to 1977	Operating	
Frontier Flyers	Hersheypark	United States	Larson International	2003	Operating	
Air Crow	Indiana Beach	United States	Larson International	2004	Operating	
Tink's Flying School	Oakwood Theme Park	United Kingdom	Larson International	2004	Removed	
Mountain Gliders; Formerly Woodstock Gliders, Phantom Flyers; Formerly Flying Eagles, Flying Scooters	Carowinds; Kings Island; Coney Island	United States	Bisch-Rocco	2005; 1972 to 2004; 1940 to 1971	Operating	
Flying Scooters	Camden Park	United States	Larson International	2006	Operating	
Flying Aces	Idlewild Park	United States	Premier Rides	2007	Operating	
Dragon Flyer	Castle Park	United States	Larson International	2008	Operating	
Hornet's Nest	Six Flags Darien Lake	United States	Larson International	2012	Operating	
Thunderbirds; Formerly Flying Scooters	Eldridge Park; Fun Spot Amusement Park & Zoo; Fantasy Farm	United States	Bisch-Rocco	2012; Unknown; Unknown	Operating	
Lakeside Gliders	Michigan's Adventure	United States	Larson International	2013	Operating	
Screamin' Eagles	Six Flags Great Escape	United States	Larson International	2013	Operating	
Surfside Gliders	Knott's Berry Farm	United States	Larson International	2013	Operating	
Flying Scooters; Formerly French Quarter Flyers	Six Flags Great Adventure; Six Flags America	United States	Larson International	2026; 2014 to 2025	operating	
Lake Erie Eagles	Cedar Point	United States	Larson International	2014	Operating	
Honeybee Buzzers; Formerly Professor John's Flying Machines	Kentucky Kingdom	United States	Larson International	2014	Operating	
Winged Warrior	Frontier City	United States	Larson International	2014	Operating	
MT Buckets; Formerly Cedar Creek Flyers	Dorney Park & Wildwater Kingdom	United States	Larson International	2015	Operating	
Kong	Morey's Piers	United States	Larson International	2015	Operating	
Franklin's Flyers; Formerly Woodstock Gliders	Kings Island	United States	Larson International	2015	Operating	
Flying Eagles	Canada's Wonderland	Canada	Larson International	2016	Operating	
Flying Eagles	Valleyfair	United States	Larson International	2016	Operating	
Phoenix	La Ronde	Canada	Larson International	2016	Operating	
Woodstock Gliders	Worlds of Fun	United States	Larson International	2016	Operating	
Wonder Woman Flight School	Six Flags Over Georgia	United States	Larson International	2016	Operating	
Flying Scooter	Fox Creek Amusement Company	United States	Bisch-Rocco	2016	Operating	
The Mad Mocking Bird	Dollywood	United States	Larson International	2019	Operating	
Flying Circus	Celebration City	United States	Larson International	Unknown	Closed	
The Barnstormers	Guyton's Fun Junction	United States	Unknown	Unknown	Closed	

== See also ==
- Jacobs Jaycopter
