= Arnolds Park (amusement park) =

Amusement park

- Interactive map of Arnolds Park
- Location: Arnolds Park, Iowa, U.S.
- Coordinates: 43.3654°N 95.1375°W
- Status: Operating
- Opened: 1889
- Owner: Arnolds Park Amusement Park, Inc.
- Area: 12 acres (4.9 ha)

Attractions
- Total: 23
- Roller coasters: 3
- Water rides: 1
- Website: arnoldspark.com

Arnolds Park Amusement Park is a historic amusement park in Arnolds Park, Iowa. The park offers 23 rides on its 20 acres (81,000 m^{2}) site. Arnolds Park consists of a full-fledged amusement park plus Go-Karts, a West Lake Okoboji Excursion Boat Cruise and plenty of retail availability. Today, it is surrounded by several landmarks. The park is home to Legend, An ACE Coaster Landmark. Legend, which carried its first riders in 1927, is believed to be the 13th oldest wooden roller coaster in the U.S. In 2012, the amusement park was selected as one of the fifteen best in the Midwest region by Midwest Living magazine.

Arnolds Park offers picnicking, a catering service, an arcade, and live entertainment including school bands, dance groups and magic shows.

The park uses an all-day ride, go karts, and Queen II Ticketing or pay-by-ride options system. Admission to enter the park itself is free.

== Rides and attractions ==
Ride name	Attraction Type	Opening year	Manufacturer
Roller Coasters
Legend	Wooden Roller Coaster	1927 or 1930	Outdoor Amusement Enterprise, Inc.
Little Coaster	Kiddie Coaster	1999	Miler Manufacturing
Mad Mouse	Wild Mouse roller coaster	2019	Allan Herschell Company
Thrill Rides
Rock-O-Plane	Rock-O-Plane	1954	Eyerly
Roll-O-Plane	Roll-O-Plane	1960	Eyerly
Boji Falls Log Ride	Log Flume	2001	Arrow
Family Rides
Reckless			
Tipsy House			
Tilt-A-Whirl	Tilt-A-Whirl	1979	Sellner
Pirates Revenge	Pirate Ship	1990	Chance
	Dizzy Dragon	1977	Larson
Boji Bounce	Trampoline	2012	US Thrill Rides
Swinger	Swing ride	1980	S.D.C.
Octopus	Swing ride	1970	Schwarzkopf
Bumper Cars	Bumper Cars	1970	S.D.C.
Kiddie Rides
Jumpin’ Star	Jumpin’ Star	2008	Zamperla
Freddie The Fish	Bulgy the Whale	1952	Eyerly
El Paso Train	Train		Zamperla
Kiddie Boats	Boat ride	1955	Allan Herschell Company
Dizzy Dragons	Dizzy Dragons	1979	Larson
Long Lines Limited Train	Train		Unknown
Carousel	Carousel	1915	Chance Rides
Attractions
The Beach	Lakeside Beach	-	-
Extreme Water Sports	Jetskis	-	-
Queen II	Excursion Boat	-	-
