= Leap-The-Dips =

United States historic place

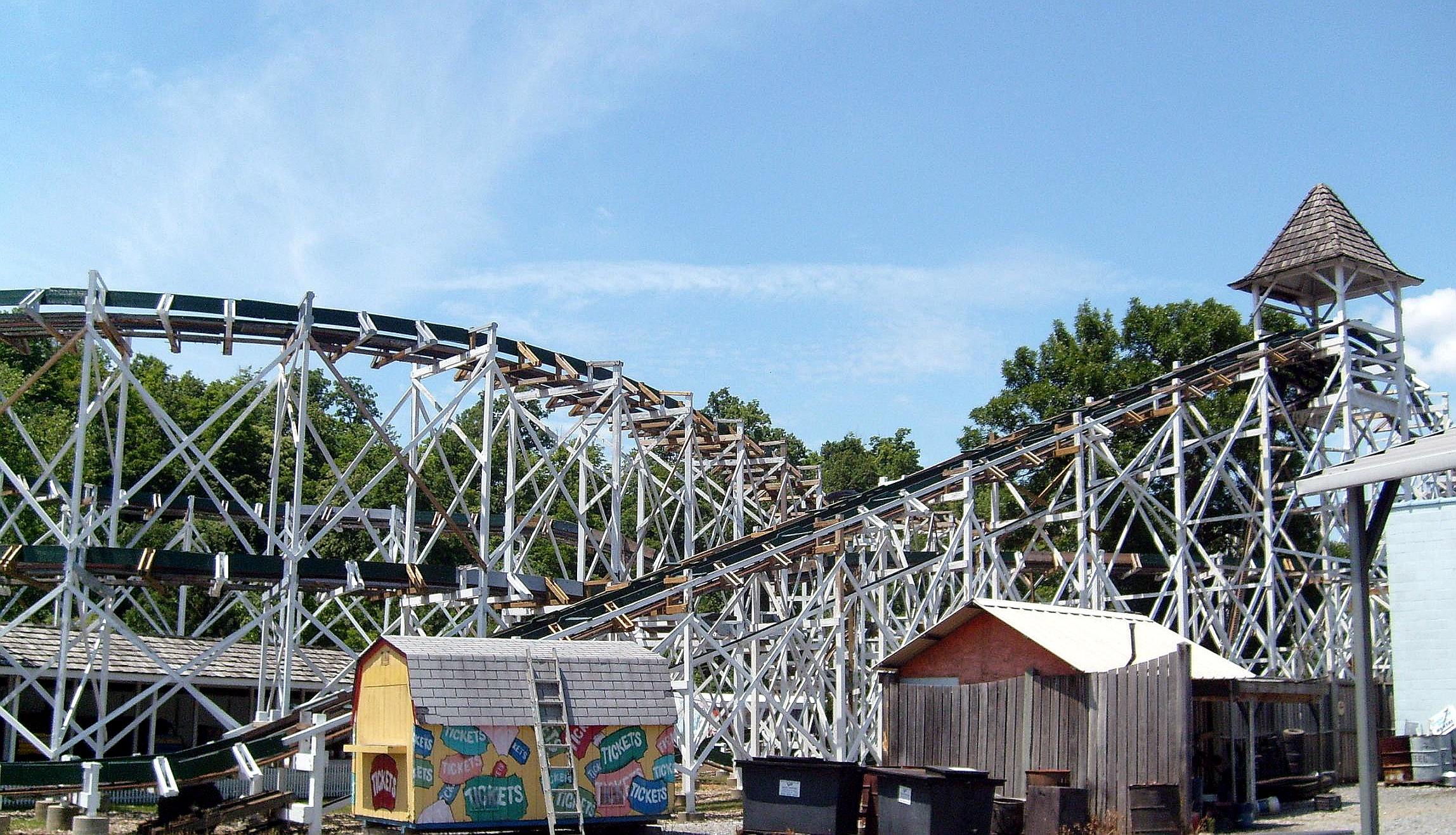
- Leap-The-Dips in 2007

Lakemont Park
- Location: Lakemont Park
- Coordinates: 40°28′15″N 78°23′48″W
- Status: Closed
- Opening date: June 2, 1902 (124 years ago)

General statistics
- Type: Wood – Side-friction
- Manufacturer: Federal Construction Company
- Designer: Edward Joy Morris
- Height: 41 ft (12 m)
- Drop: 9 ft (2.7 m)
- Length: 1,452 ft (443 m)
- Speed: 10 mph (16 km/h)
- Duration: 1:00
- Max vertical angle: 25°
- Trains: Unknown number of trains with a single car; riders arranged 2 across in 2 rows for a total of 4 riders per train
- Leap-The-Dips at RCDB

- Leap-the-Dips
- U.S. National Register of Historic Places
- U.S. National Historic Landmark
- Pennsylvania state historical marker
- Location within Pennsylvania Location within the United States
- Location: Logan Township, Blair County, Pennsylvania, U.S.
- Coordinates: 40°28′15″N 78°23′48″W
- Built: 1902
- Architect: Edward Joy Morris
- NRHP reference No.: 91000229

Significant dates
- Added to NRHP: March 15, 1991
- Designated NHL: June 19, 1996
- Designated PHMC: November 28, 2000

Leap-The-Dips is a wooden roller coaster located at Lakemont Park in Altoona, Pennsylvania. Built in 1902 by the Federal Construction Company and designed by E. Joy Morris, it is the oldest standing roller coaster in the world and believed to be the last surviving side-friction roller coaster of the figure-eight variety.

Leap-the-Dips operated continuously until 1985, when it closed after falling into disrepair. A fundraising campaign led to its restoration, with refurbishment efforts beginning in 1997 and ending with a grand-reopening in 1999. It was designated a National Historic Landmark in 1996 and received the Coaster Classic and Coaster Landmark awards from American Coaster Enthusiasts (ACE). Since 2024, the roller coaster has not been operating.

== History ==
Leap-The-Dips was designed by Edward Joy Morris and constructed by the Federal Construction Company. It opened to the public in 1902 at Lakemont Park. Its figure-eight design was common on side friction roller coasters constructed in the early 1900s, reaching peak popularity in the Roaring Twenties. Leap-The-Dips is one of the few coasters to survive from the era and is considered the oldest remaining roller coaster in the world.

In 1985, the attraction closed as a result of structural integrity concerns and lack of maintenance funds. A fundraising effort initiated by the American Coaster Enthusiasts organization led to the formation of the Leap-The-Dips Foundation, which accepted private donations and worked with eight local banks along with the Progress Fund to save the roller coaster from demolition.

Restoration began in 1997, utilizing carpentry techniques that were performed during its original construction, with over seventy percent of the original wood remaining intact. Leap-The-Dips officially reopened to the public on May 31, 1999.

Prior to its restoration by P. Joseph Lehman, Inc., Consulting Engineers, the roller coaster was added to the list of National Register of Historic Places in 1993. Several years later in 1996, it was designated a National Historic Landmark.

Following its reopening, ACE awarded Leap-The-Dips two awards, the Coaster Landmark Award and the Coaster Classic Award.

In early 2017, it was announced that Lakemont Park would undergo a complete restoration and transformation that would require the park to remain closed for one season; and announced that it would remain closed during the 2018 season with plans to reopen as a "family entertainment location with some amusements" in the summer of 2019. The park opened in 2019. The coaster has not been operational since 2023; the park claimed financial constraints forced them to suspend operation of their amusement rides.

== Description and design ==
Leap-The-Dips occupies a rectangular area measuring 84 by 229 feet (26 m × 70 m) on the grounds of Lakemont Park. The track is arranged in a figure-eight layout and mounted on wooden trestles. The entry and exit station is an open, hipped-roof pavilion, and cars are stored in a nearby shed when not in use.

The track's form has been altered very little since its original construction, with portions of the track – mostly wood – being replaced by steel in areas of exceptionally high wear, along with the conversion of the lift chain to steel. The lift mechanism includes a ratchet system to prevent cars from rolling backwards in the event of a chain failure. The ride cars resemble sleighs featuring four flanged wheels underneath and two unflanged wheels projecting to each side. The track traverses two and a half circuits of a figure-eight, passing through the trestle structure at different levels. Although the ride is quite tame by modern standards with a height of 41 feet (12 m) and speed of 10 mph (16 km/h), it remains a popular attraction due to its historical significance.

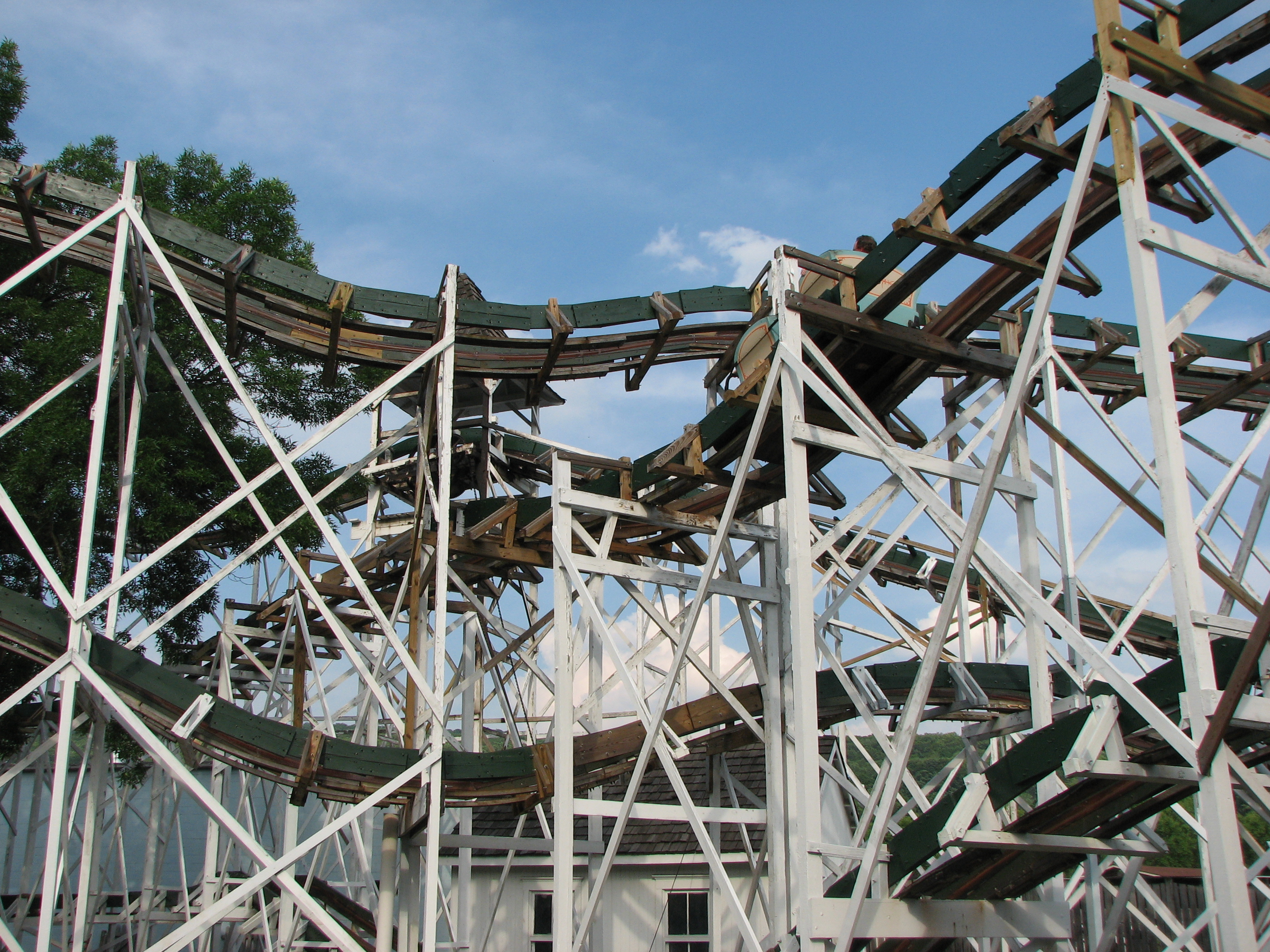
Tracks crossing tracks in the trestles

Side friction roller coasters were an early innovation in roller coasters which enabled them to run at greater speeds and without a brakeman. Extra wheels were mounted on the sides of the cars to guide their movement on the track. This design became obsolete after World War I when side friction was supplanted by under-track mechanisms, which offered better vehicle security and support for greater speeds.

There have been roller coasters similar to Leap-The-Dips in other parks in the past, including an identical Leap the Dips at Mounds State Park in Anderson, Indiana, which closed in 1929. Very few side friction roller coasters survived into the 1980s, and Leap-the-Dips was believed to be the last remaining figure-eight model of its kind still in operation.

== See also ==
- Amusement rides on the National Register of Historic Places
- List of National Historic Landmarks in Pennsylvania
- National Register of Historic Places listings in Blair County, Pennsylvania
