= Montaña Suiza =

Steel scenic railway roller coaster

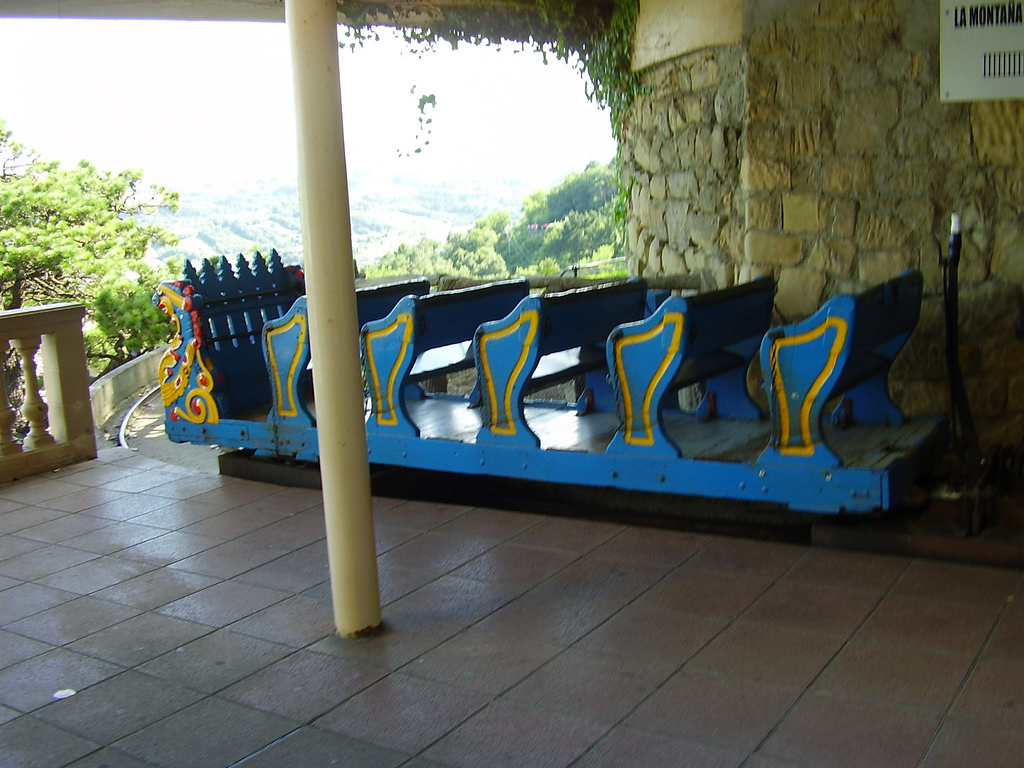
- The leading car of a train of Montaña Suiza.

Monte Igueldo Amusement Park
- Location: Monte Igueldo Amusement Park
- Coordinates: 43.320677°N 2.010657°W
- Status: Operating
- Opening date: 1928

General statistics
- Designer: Erich Heidrich
- Track layout: Terrain
- Lift/launch system: Cable-lift
- Height: 32 ft (9.8 m)
- Length: 1,312.3 ft (400.0 m)
- Speed: 31 mph (50 km/h)
- Inversions: 0
- Duration: 1:30
- Restraint style: None
- Trains: 2 trains with 2 cars; riders arranged 2 across in 5 rows for a total of 20 riders per train
- Montaña Suiza at RCDB

Montaña Suiza ("Swiss Mountain" in English) is a steel scenic railway roller coaster located at Monte Igueldo Amusement Park, on the coast at San Sebastián, Spain. It was designed and built by German engineer Erich Heidrich and opened at the site in 1928. It is the oldest steel roller coaster still operating in the world.

The ride was built with wooden running rails in a trough, like usual scenic railways. The trough is partially set into the landscape and is of concrete construction. The ride lacks the traditional supporting trestles of scenic railways. Instead, the track runs in depressions set into the ground and along the top of a coastal wall at one point. The running rails were changed to steel at an unknown later date.

The roller coaster operates with two trains, each of which are composed of two 2x5 person cars. The cars are wooden in construction and ride on steel bogies, like the scenic railways at Margate, UK, Great Yarmouth Pleasure Beach, UK and Luna Park, Melbourne. A brakeman rides on the front of the second car of each train to control its speed.

== Videos ==
- Onride, from the rear car, the ride operator is between the cars
- Onride, first seats
