= Wildcat (Frontier City) =

Wooden roller coaster

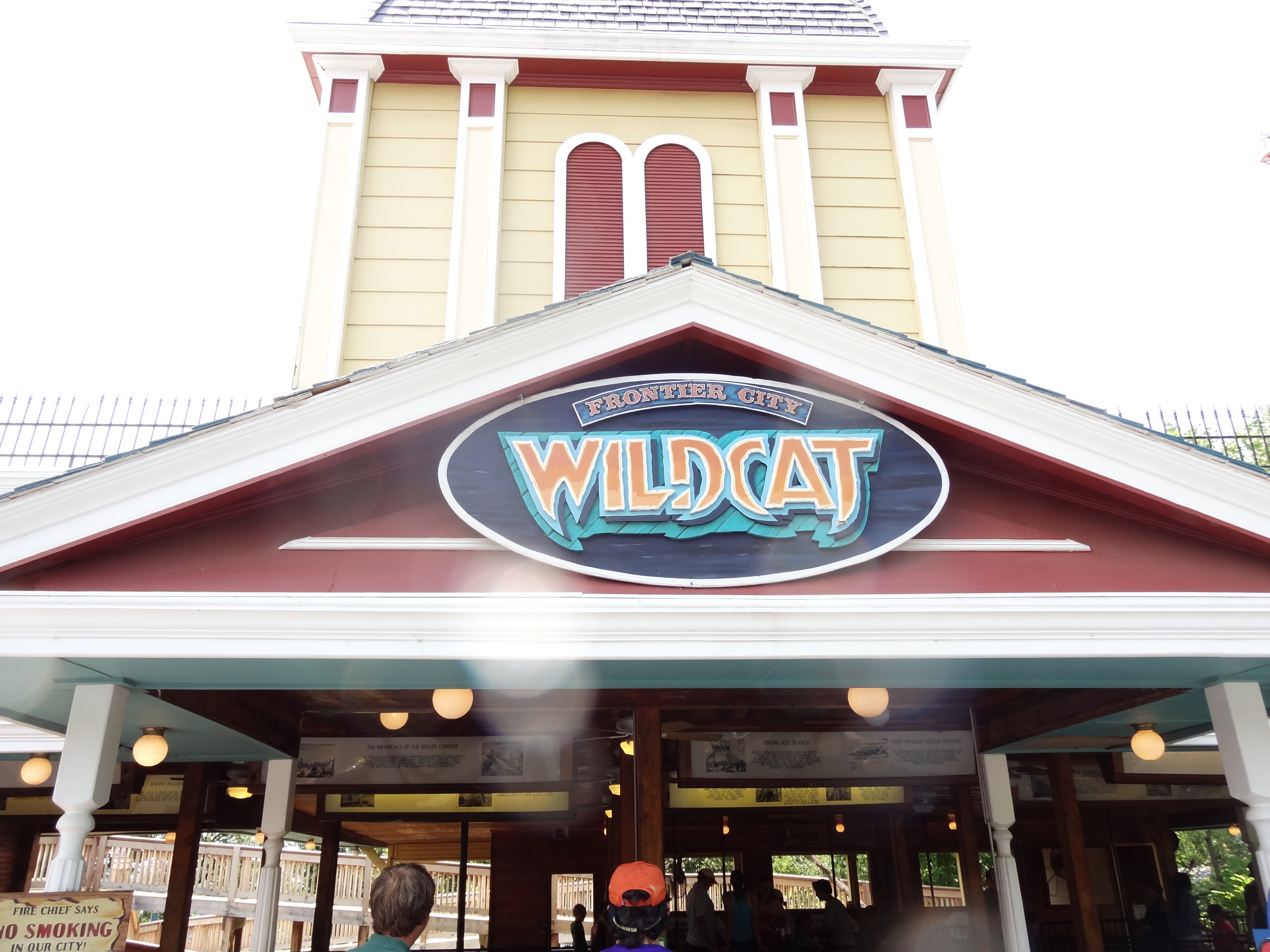

Frontier City
- Coordinates: 35.5828415°N 97.4420955°W
- Status: Operating
- Opening date: April 20, 1991
- Cost: $2 million

Fairyland Park
- Coordinates: 38.991°N 94.558°W
- Status: Removed
- Opening date: 1968
- Closing date: 1977

General statistics
- Type: Wood
- Manufacturer: National Amusement Devices
- Designer: Aurel Vaszin; Edward Leis
- Model: Wooden roller coaster
- Track layout: Out and back
- Lift/launch system: Chain lift hill
- Height: 75 ft (23 m)
- Drop: 65 ft (20 m)
- Length: 2,653 ft (809 m)
- Speed: 46 mph (74 km/h)
- Duration: 2:10
- Height restriction: 42 in (107 cm)
- Trains: 2 trains with 3 cars; riders arranged 2 across in 3 rows for a total of 18 riders per train
- Fast Lane available
- Wildcat at RCDB

Wildcat is a wooden roller coaster located at Frontier City in Oklahoma City, Oklahoma. Manufactured by National Amusement Devices, it originally opened at Fairyland Park in 1968, but following the park's closure in 1977, it was placed into storage and re-opened at Frontier City on April 20, 1991. The ride was modified and rebuilt by Philadelphia Toboggan Coasters for the 1991 reopening.

== History ==
=== Fairyland Park (1968–1990) ===
In 1968, Wildcat opened at Fairyland Park in Kansas City, Missouri as the park's biggest ride, an attempt by its owners to stay competitive with other parks. The park was closed in 1977 due to extensive storm damage and the opening of the nearby Worlds of Fun in 1972. Wildcat sat abandoned with many other attractions from the park.

=== Frontier City (since 1990) ===
In 1990, Wildcat was removed from the abandoned Fairyland Park and moved to Frontier City. Re-construction of the roller coaster began in June 1990, and major modifications were made to the track in order to fit the area it was placed in.

The queue house features a "chicken exit" that guests can take if they chicken out during the last minute.

In 1999, the original two trains used for the coaster were replaced with PTC trains for the 1999 season. Sometime before the 2004 season, one of the trains was removed for unknown reasons, reducing the coaster to strictly one-train operation.

Wildcat was given new trains for the 2021 season.

== Incidents ==
On July 26, 2021, a train became stuck on Wildcat's lift hill, and a park guest entered the restricted area climbing over a handrail and up the Wildcat lift with the intention of delivering water to riders stuck on the train. After being spotted, operators completely shut down the ride, and all riders were evacuated from the train. The park guest was banned for five years from all Six Flags parks, with officials stating that the situation was under control and that his actions were "unsafe and unwarranted" despite his intentions.
