= Switchback Railway =

Former roller coaster at Coney Island, Brooklyn, New York

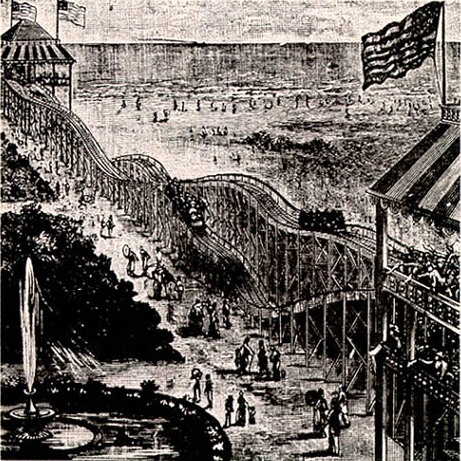
- The original Switchback Railway at Coney Island

Coney Island
- Location: Coney Island
- Park section: Coney Island Cyclone Site
- Coordinates: 40.574°N 73.978°W
- Status: Removed
- Opening date: June 16, 1884

General statistics
- Type: Wood
- Manufacturer: LaMarcus Adna Thompson
- Designer: LaMarcus Adna Thompson
- Model: Lift Packed
- Track layout: Gravity pulled coaster
- Lift/launch system: gravity
- Height: 50 ft (15 m)
- Drop: 43 ft (13 m)
- Length: 600 ft (180 m)
- Speed: 6 mph (9.7 km/h)
- Duration: 1:00
- Max vertical angle: 30°
- Capacity: 1600 riders per hour
- G-force: 2.9
- Switchback Railway at RCDB

The original Switchback Railway was the first roller coaster at Coney Island in Brooklyn, New York City, and one of the earliest designed for amusement in the United States. The 1885 patent states the invention relates to the gravity double track switchback railway, which had predicated the inclined plane railway, patented in 1878 by Richard Knudsen. Coney Island's version was designed by LaMarcus Adna Thompson in 1881 and constructed in 1884. Thompson's motivations to develop the roller coaster alledge to come from his disgust with current the cultural rise of hedonistic amusements like saloons and brothels. It appears Thompson based his design, at least in part, on the Mauch Chunk Switchback Railway which was a coal-mining train that had started carrying passengers as a thrill ride in 1827.

For five cents, riders would climb a tower to board the large bench-like car and were pushed off to coast 600 ft (183 m) down the track to another tower. The car went just over 6 mph (9.7 km/h). At the top of the other tower the vehicle was switched to a return track or "switched back" (hence the name).

This track design was soon replaced with an oval complete-circuit ride designed by Charles Alcoke and called the Serpentine Railway. In 1885 Phillip Hinkle developed a lift system which appeared in his ride called Gravity Pleasure. The Gravity Pleasure also featured cars in which the passengers could face forward instead of in the awkward bench-like seats of the first two roller coasters. The next year, Thompson patented his design of coasters that included dark tunnels with painted scenery. Thompson built many more roller coasters under the name "The L.A. Thompson Scenic Railway" across the United States. Some of these operated until 1954.

== Other rides ==
There was also a switchback railway at the Melbourne Centennial Exhibition in 1888.
