= LaMarcus Adna Thompson =

American inventor and businessman (1848–1919)

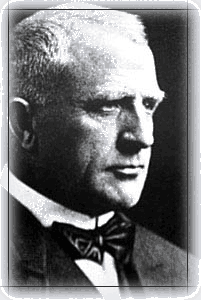
- LaMarcus Thompson
- Born: March 8, 1848; Jersey, Ohio
- Died: May 8, 1919 (aged 71); Glen Cove, New York, U.S.

LaMarcus Adna Thompson (March 8, 1848 – May 8, 1919) was an American inventor and businessman most famous for developing a variety of gravity rides and roller coasters.

== Early years ==
Thompson was born in Jersey, Licking County, Ohio on March 8, 1848. His parents were Adna Thompson (father), and Nancy D. Thompson (mother). He had a brother named Olvid. In his adolescence, he became a skilled carpenter. In 1873 he began operating a grocery store in Elkhart, Indiana. There he began designing a device to manufacture seamless stockings and tights for women. He made a fortune in that business, but failing health forced him to quit.

== Father of the gravity ride and the roller coaster ==
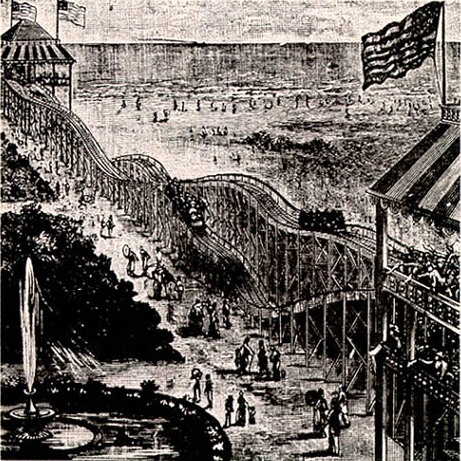
Thompson's Switchback Railway 1884.

Thompson is best known for his early work developing roller coasters and for inventing the scenic railway genre of rides. He is known as the "Father of the American Roller Coaster" and is often also called the "Father of the Gravity Ride". Over his lifetime, Thompson accumulated nearly thirty patents related to roller coaster technologies. An example is the patent granted December 22, 1884, for the Gravity Switch-back Railway. Thompson's work built upon an earlier patent for an "Inclined Plane Railway", filed in 1878 by Richard Knudson.

Thompson's breakthrough ride was the "Gravity Switchback Railway", which opened at Coney Island in 1884. A single (6 mph) ride cost 5 cents. Thompson's motivations to develop the roller coaster allege to come from his disgust with current the cultural rise of hedonistic amusements like saloons and brothels. In 1887, along with designer James A. Griffiths, he opened the Scenic Railway on the Boardwalk in Atlantic City, N.J. Thompson's scenic railway concept initially was intended to give riders a scenic view of the surrounding landscape; later, Thompson created elaborate painted backgrounds and scenes so that riders would feel like they were touring the Swiss Alps or other foreign landscapes.

Thompson was managing director of the L. A. Thompson Scenic Railway Company, 220 West 42nd St., incorporated in 1895. Thompson's scenic railways were immensely popular during the first and second decade of the 1900s, and his company operated six major scenic railways at Coney Island alone during that time. Dozens of scenic railways operated throughout the U.S. and in Europe. Eventually, the scenic railway was eclipsed by faster and more thrilling roller coaster rides made possible by improvements in roller coaster safety technology.

== Death ==
Thompson died at his home, Thompson Park, Glen Cove, Long Island, on May 8, 1919, at age 71.
