= Conneaut Lake Park =

Summer resort and event venue

- Previously known as Exposition Park

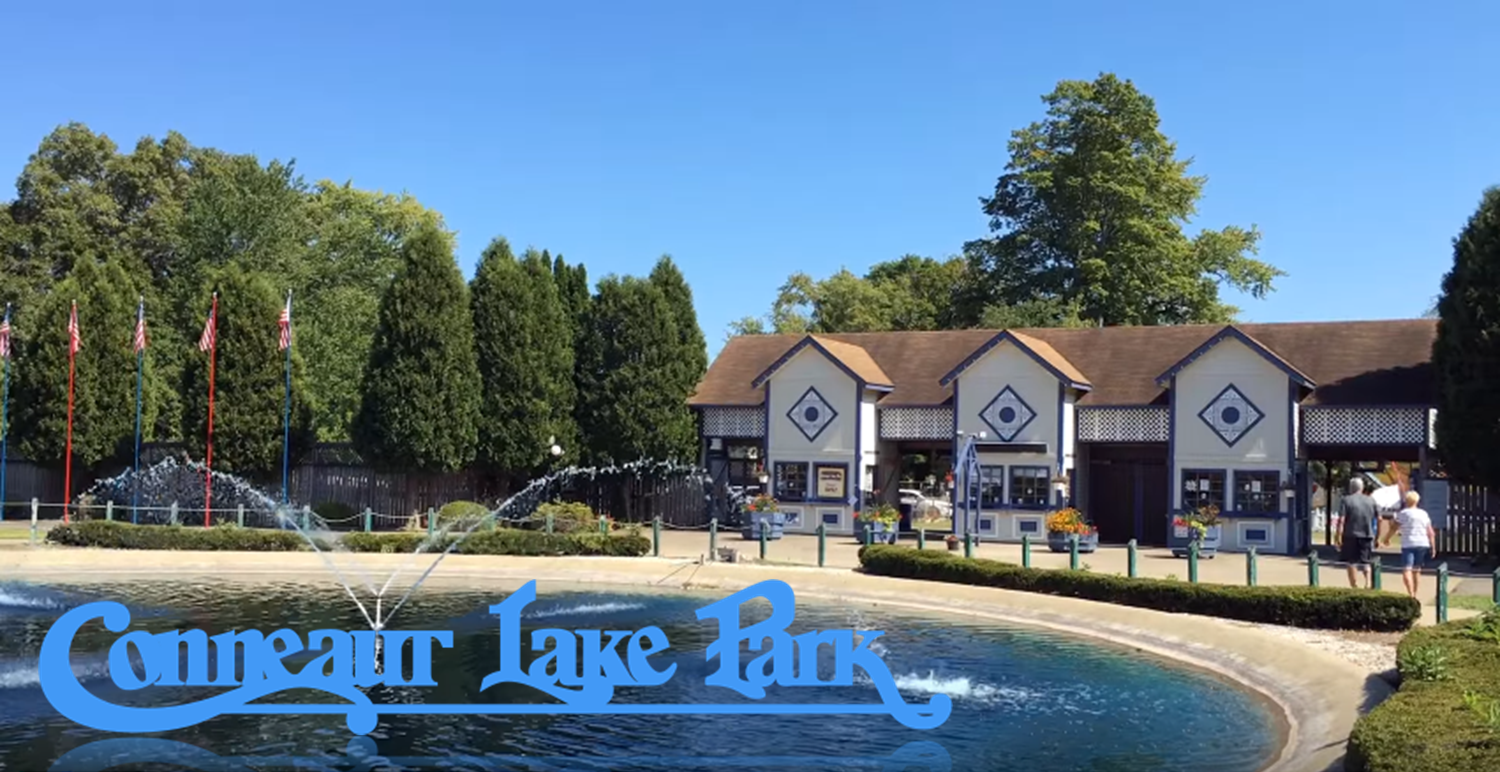
- Interactive map of Conneaut Lake Park
- Location: Conneaut Lake, Pennsylvania, United States
- Coordinates: 41.63556°N 80.315°W
- Opened: 1892
- Owner: Keldon Holdings, LLC Todd Joseph Fenstermacher
- Operating season: May to October
- Area: 200 acres (0.81 km^{2})

Attractions
- Total: 12
- Roller coasters: 1

Conneaut Lake Park /ˈkɒniˌɔːt/ is a summer resort and event venue located in Conneaut Lake, Pennsylvania, United States. It has long served as a regional tourist destination, and was noted by roller coaster enthusiasts for its classic Blue Streak coaster, which was classified as "historic" by the American Coaster Enthusiasts group in 2010. Conneaut Lake is Pennsylvania's largest natural (glacier) lake, and is a popular summer destination for recreational boaters due to there being no horsepower limit on the lake.

== History ==
=== Exposition Park ===
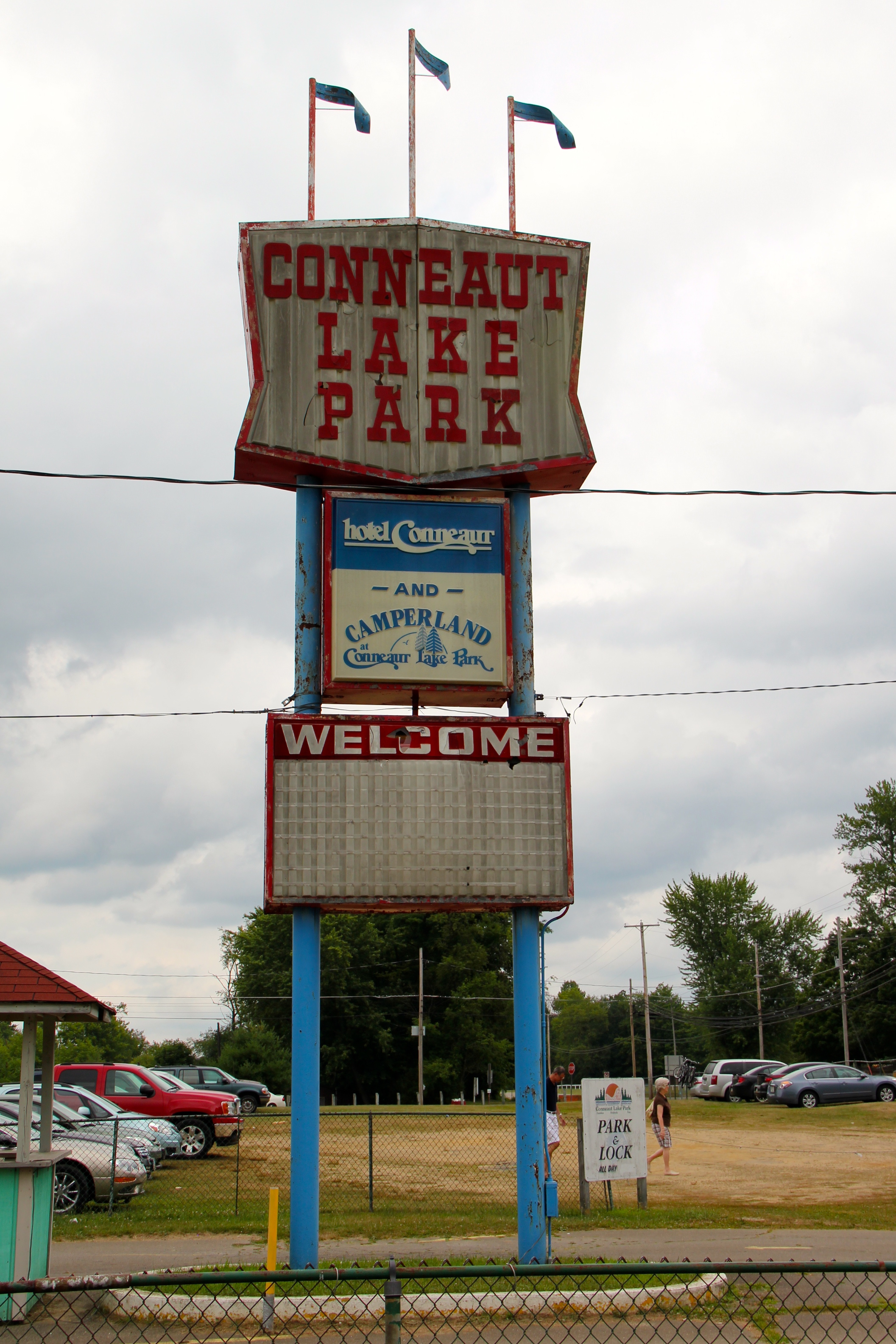
Former park sign in 2012

Conneaut Lake Park was founded in 1892 as Exposition Park by Col. Frank Mantor as a permanent fairground and exposition for livestock, machinery, and industrial products from Western Pennsylvania. Prior to this time, 7 acres of land on which the park is located were purchased in 1877 by Aaron Lynce for use as a boat landing. Col. Mantor's company, the Conneaut Lake Exposition Company, purchased an additional 175 acres of adjacent land, 75 of which were given to Mr. Lynce as payment for his parcel.

During its early years, buildings at Exposition Park included a dance hall, a convention hall (for lectures), and a bathhouse. Several of the structures from Lynce's landing were also retained, including a farmhouse on the property that was converted to a hotel. The park's first mechanical ride, a carousel, opened in 1899, and was soon joined by other rides and a midway.

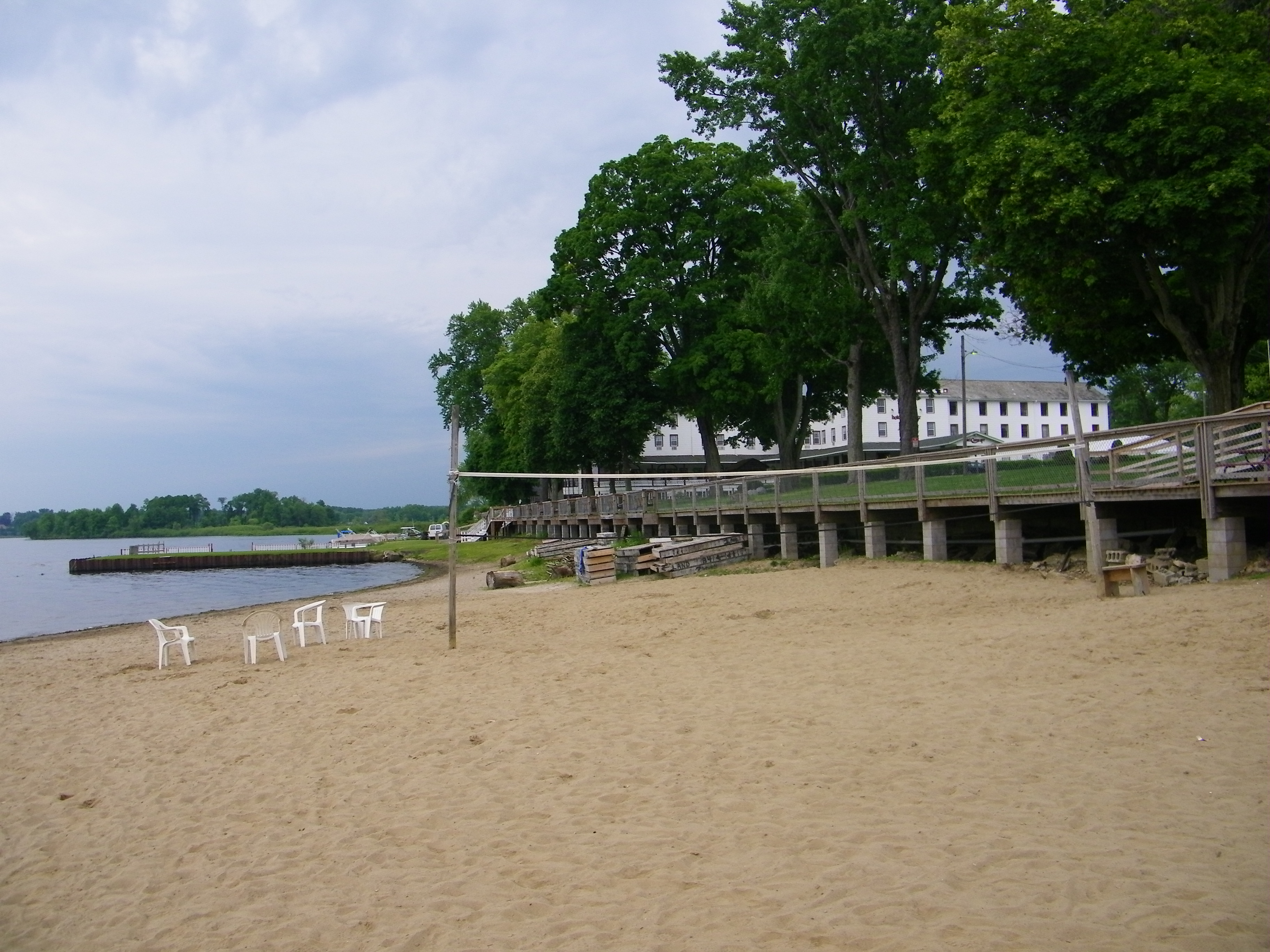
Beach in 2014

Ownership of the park transferred to the Pittsburgh & Shenango Valley Railroad in 1901, during which time several hotels were built on the property. Originally accessible only by boat or train, trolley service was extended to the park in 1907. With its lakefront presence, hotels, and remote location, the park became a popular resort destination. Although many of the park's original buildings were lost in a fire in 1908, new concrete block replacements were constructed, including the Dreamland Ballroom.

=== Name change and growth ===
The park was renamed "Conneaut Lake Park" in 1920 to reflect a move toward more amusements and rides. Rides added over these years included a Tumble Bug, a bumper car ride, and a Figure Eight roller coaster called "Three Way Figure Eight Toboggan Slide" (later renamed Jack Rabbit). In 1938, the park's signature roller coaster, Blue Streak, was added.

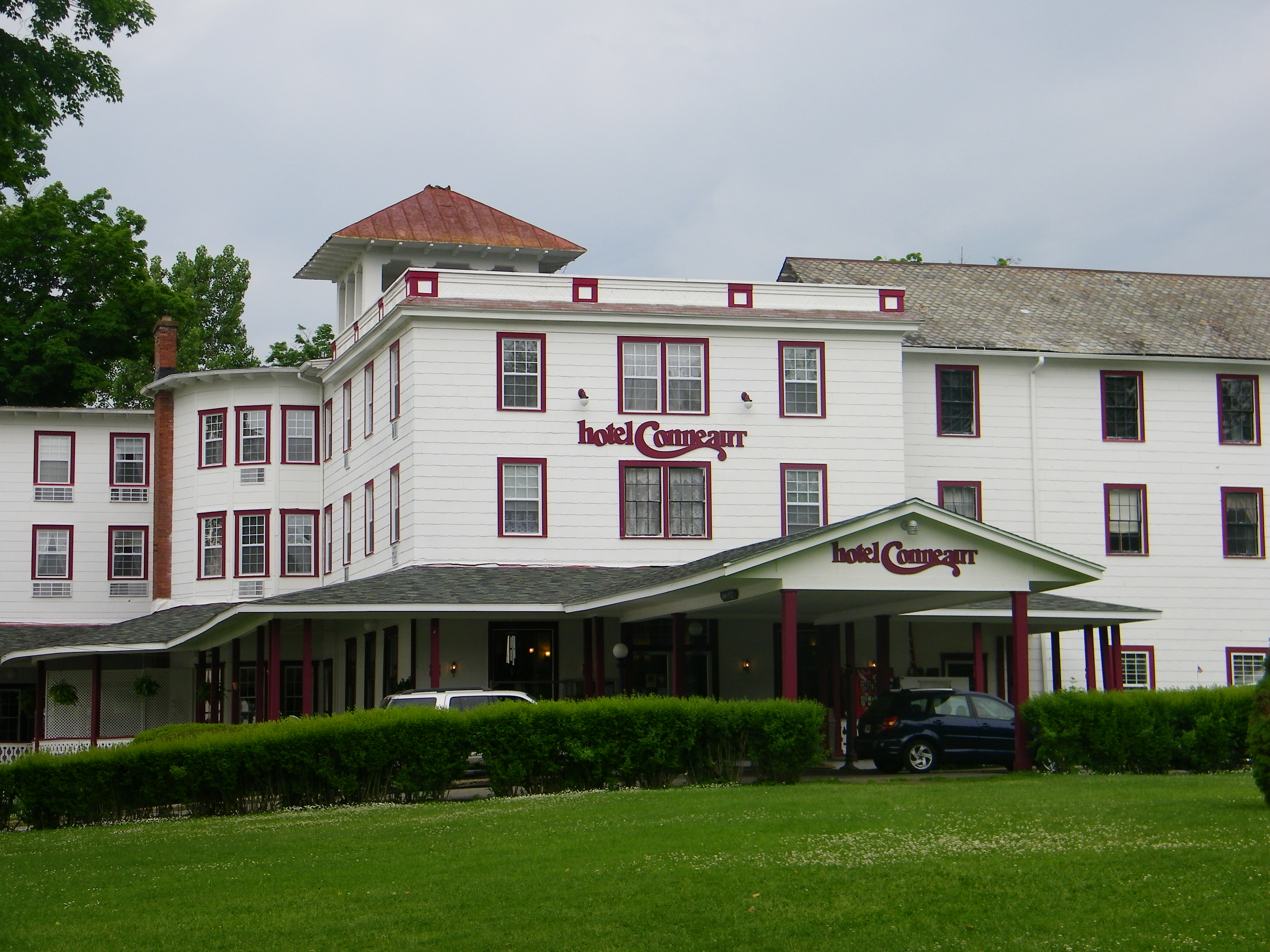
Hotel Conneaut in 2014

In 1943, a large portion of a hotel on the properties, Hotel Conneaut, was destroyed in a fire. The ghost of Elizabeth, a bride who supposedly died in the fire, is said to now haunt the hotel.

Facing competition from corporate-owned theme parks, the park added a jungle cruise ride and other new attractions in the 1960s. As trolley service had been discontinued, the park's management began to focus on directing automobile traffic to the park. "Fairyland Forest," a walk-through attraction, was constructed across the highway from the park's main entrance. Using a combination of fairy tale characters and animals to help attract families and appeal to young children, many similar attractions existed across the country at that time. Although popular, the area eventually fell into neglect and closed in 1985. It was replaced with a camper lot called Camperland in 1986.

=== Ownership changes and decline ===
By the 1990s, a series of ownership changes had taken their toll on the park. A 1974 takeover of the park by Dr. John and Mary Flynn had saddled the park with $750,000 in debt (equal to $4,896,255 today), and expansion slowed. Charles Flynn, long-time associate of New York City mayor Ed Koch and son of Dr. Gene, decided to leave politics and become actively involved in the family business. Initially, this change in management was able to invigorate the park. In the early 1980s, rides such as the Paratrooper and Yo-Yo were added. The waterfront was improved. Along the park's midway, a waterslide tower was added, which proved popular. Several other attractions, including a miniature golf course and a karaoke stage were added.

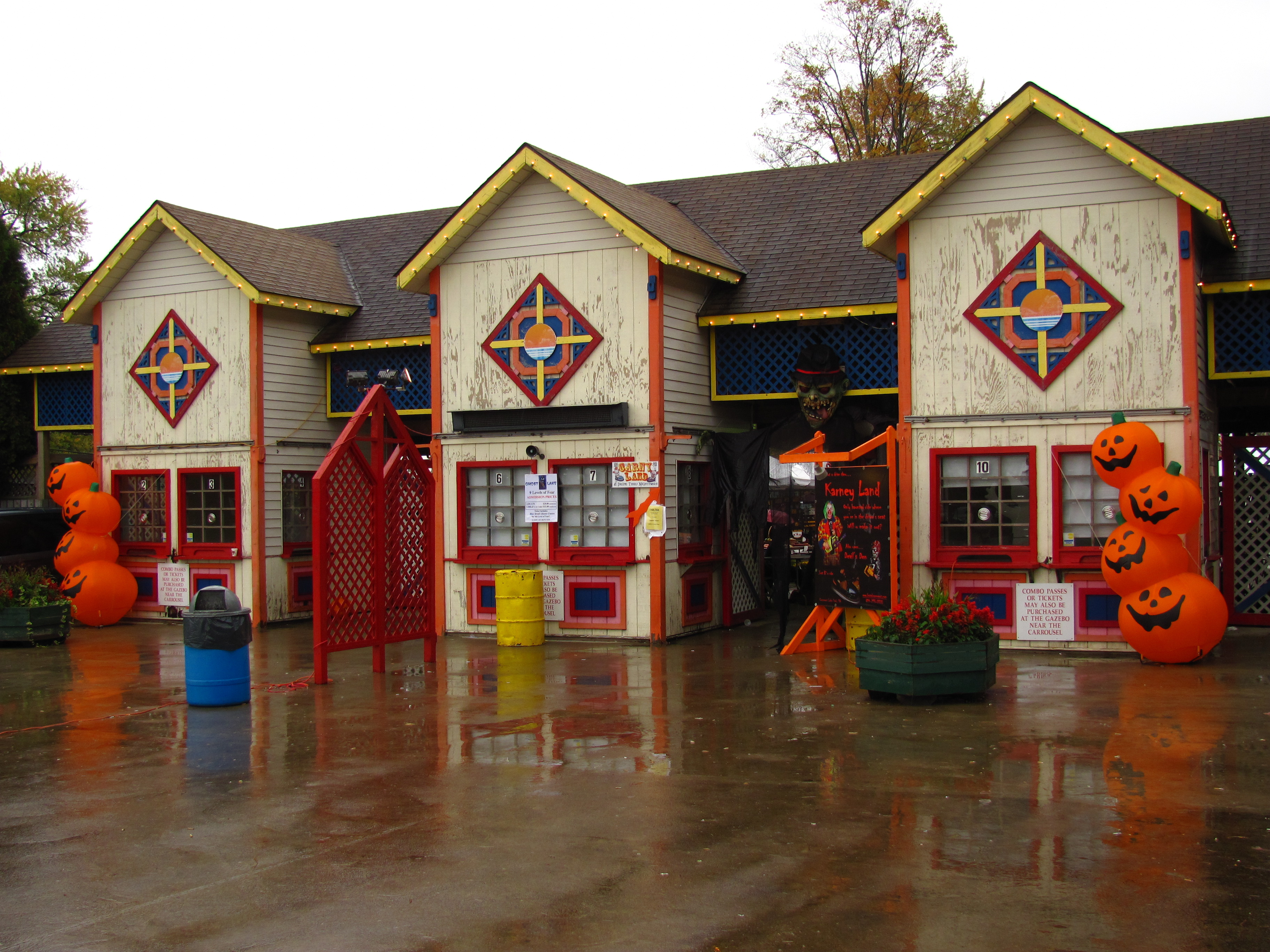
Entrance gates during October 2011

For most of its history, Conneaut Lake Park functioned as a real-life community within an amusement park, as local traffic and waterfront cottages were interspersed with the amusement rides. Park Avenue and Comstock Street, the park's main walking paths, were shared by both patrons and vehicles alike. In an effort to remain competitive, the decision was made to enclose the park for the 1990 season. For the first time in its history, admission would be charged. In a letter to customers explaining the changes, Flynn stated, "Traditional parks are dropping like flies and it's time we all realize that we have to take steps now and save our park before its too late to do anything about it."

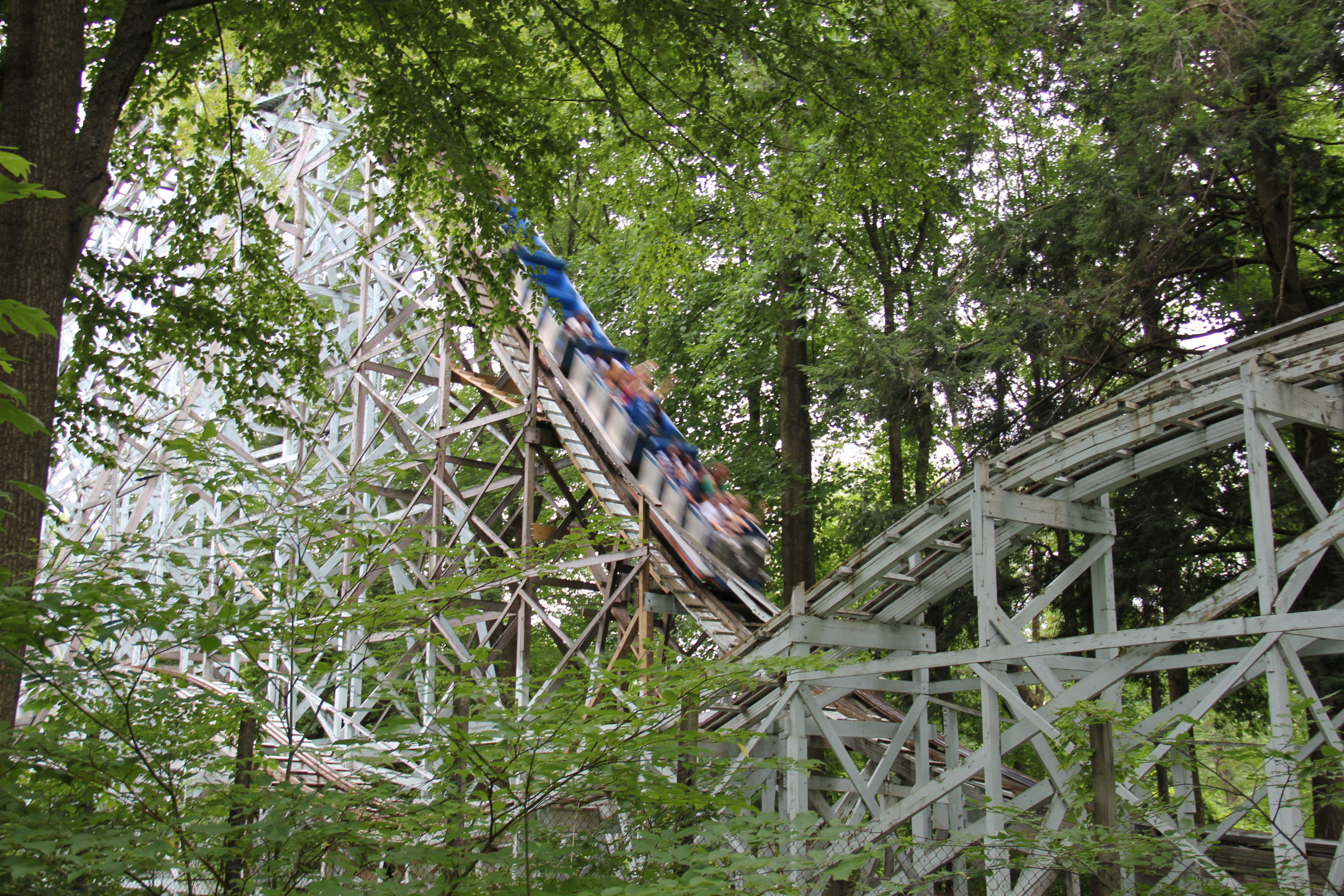
First drop of Blue Streak in 2012

The new gated park format, coupled with a rainy summer, led to a decline in attendance in the 1990 season. In an effort to raise capital, several rides were sold off. After another disastrous season in 1991, a decision was announced: the park, with the exception of the water park, would be leveled and a new family entertainment complex would be built on the property. The new family entertainment complex would focus on special events, concerts, group picnics, and non-ride activities, such as batting cages, mazes, and sports activities. The Blue Streak roller coaster, which required an estimated $100,000 in repairs, would be scrapped.

As some of the park's rides were auctioned off, a group of four local businessmen made an effort to purchase as many of them as possible. This group went on to purchase the park from the Flynn family in an attempt to preserve it as a traditional amusement park. Although nearly $1 million was spent in upgrading and refurbishing the park, attendance continued to dwindle, in part due to a public perception that the park had closed altogether. The plans for the family entertainment center never came to fruition.

In 1995, the owners filed for bankruptcy and the park did not open for the season. However, by the 1996 season, a group called Summer Resorts, Inc., under the leadership of Gary Harris, completed a purchase of the park. Although Harris arrived at Conneaut Lake Park with a history of criminal charges, residents were optimistic that the park could be saved under his leadership. The park reopened on July 4, 1996, but new problems arose in 1997 when Harris was convicted of tax evasion. To help extricate himself from his legal difficulties, Harris gave the debt-ridden park to the Conneaut Lake community in 1997, but later filed a lawsuit claiming that he held a 99-year lease on the park grounds and retained ownership of several rides. When Harris lost the lawsuit in 2001, park ownership reverted to a court-appointed trustee.

=== Early 2000s and rebirth ===
The park began the new century under the oversight of a non-profit corporation, The Trustees of Conneaut Lake Park. During this time, the park experienced a renewed interest, driven in part by roller coaster and amusement park enthusiast groups. Several of the park's rides, including The Devil's Den and Blue Streak, were repaired by volunteers. In August 2010, the park received $50,000 in funds from a contest sponsored by Pepsi for use in restoring Blue Streak.

Several fires destroyed buildings on the property, including a fire in 2008 that destroyed the Dreamland Ballroom, and a fire on August 1, 2013, that destroyed the dockside restaurant and the beach front building.

=== Timeline ===
==== 1890s ====
- 1892: Exposition Park opened.

==== 1900s ====
- 1902: Three Way Figure Eight Toboggan Slide roller coaster opened.
- 1908: A large portion of the midway, Three Way Figure Eight Toboggan Slide, a bowling alley and the park's ballroom were destroyed in a fire.
- 1909: Dreamland Ballroom opened, replacing the original ballroom lost in the 1908 fire. Scenic Railway roller coaster opened.

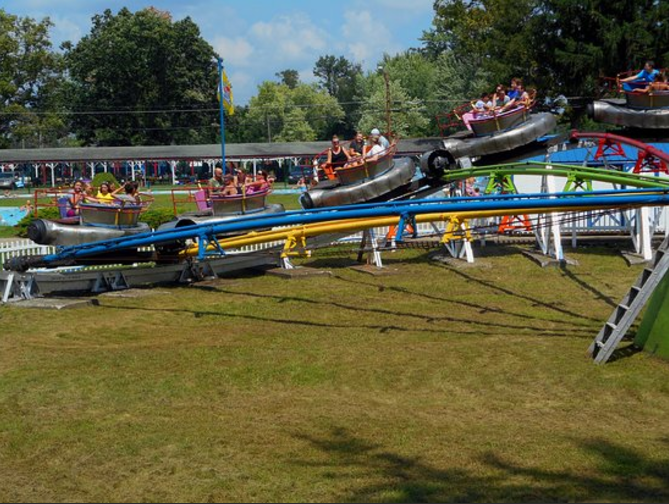
The park's historic Tumble Bug ride in 2017

==== 1920s ====
- 1920: Park was renamed Conneaut Lake Park.
- 1925: Tumble Bug ride was installed.
- 1925: Temple of Music opened.

==== 1930s ====
- 1935: Beach Club bar opened.
- 1936: Three Way Figure Eight Toboggan Slide (then known as Jack Rabbit) roller coaster closed.
- 1937: Scenic Railway roller coaster closed.
- 1938: Blue Streak roller coaster opened.

==== 1940s ====
- 1946: Temple of Music was destroyed by fire.
- 1949: Tilt-A-Whirl opened. A man was killed on Blue Streak.

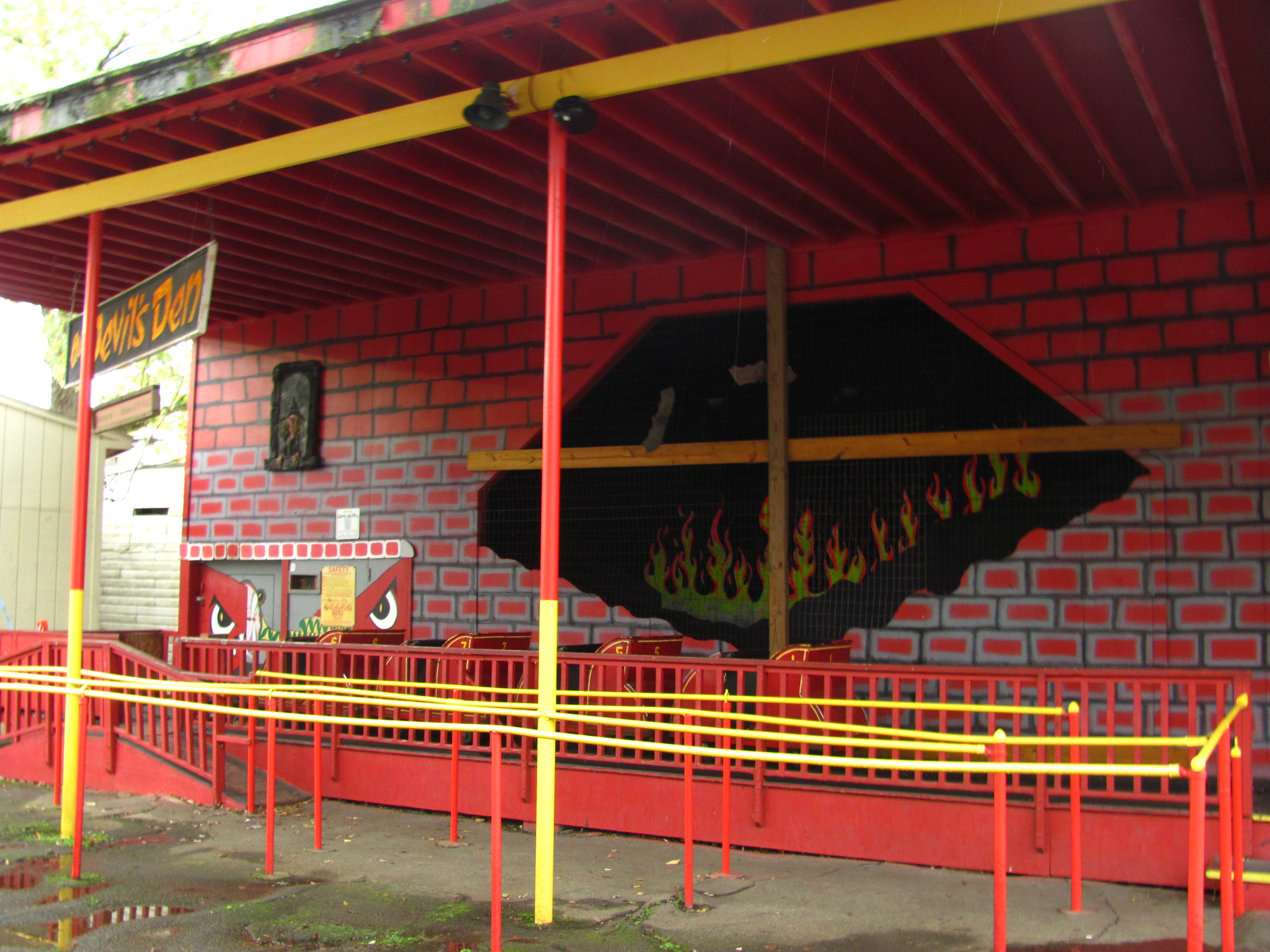
The Devil's Den in 2011

==== 1950s ====
- 1959: Ultimate Trip Scrambler ride opened.

==== 1960s ====
Blue Streak received new NAD Century Flyer trains, replacing its original trains from 1938.

- 1961: Fun House opened in former bowling alley. Wild Mouse roller coaster opened.
- 1968: The Devil's Den opened.

==== 1970s ====
- 1973: Dracula's Cave (Pit of Death) opened on the former site of the Cuddle-Up.
- 1974: Dr. John Flynn and Mrs. Mary Gene Winslow Flynn, son-in-law and daughter of Dr. Winslow, buy out the other partners, saddling the park with $750,000 in debt.
- 1975: Fun House closed. The Scrambler was moved into the gutted building, black lights, strobes, and loud music are added, and it was renamed the Ultimate Trip.
- 1976: Hell Hole rotor ride opened.

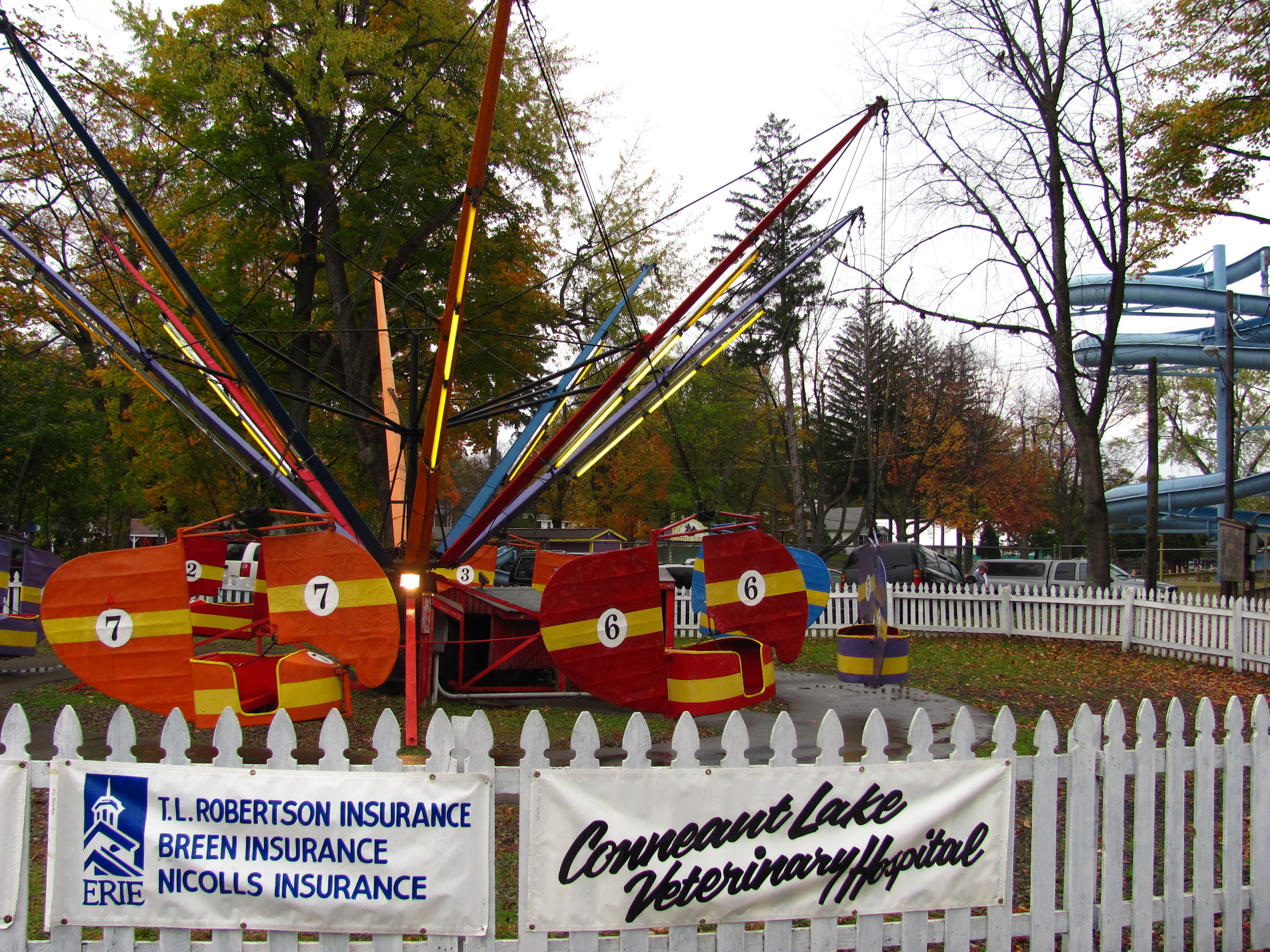
Flying Scooters in 2011

==== 1980s ====
- 1981: Charles Winslow Flynn, son of Dr. and Mrs. Flynn, took over operation of the park.
- 1985: Dracula's Cave (Pit of Death) closed; the building was converted to locker rooms and showers for the water park. Fairyland Forest closed.
- 1986: Camperland opened on the site of Fairyland Forest. Cliffhanger Falls was built.

==== 1990s ====
- 1990: New front gate constructed. Wild Mouse roller coaster closed.
- 1991: Connie Otter's Kiddie Cove and Otter Creek Adventure River were built behind Cliffhanger Falls, creating the water park Splash City.
- 1992: The Devil's Den was renamed Dr. Moriarity's Wild Ride. Conneaut Lake Park celebrated its 100th anniversary. At the end of the season, it was announced that many rides would be removed and Blue Streak would be demolished. Hell Hole was removed. The Flynn family sold the park.
- 1993: Local businessmen purchased many of the rides at auction to keep Conneaut Lake Park as an amusement park. Management lost $125,000 in operations.
- 1994: Lost $800,000.
- 1995: The park failed to open due to bankruptcy.
- 1996: The park was purchased by Gary Harris. It reopened on July 4, although Blue Streak did not reopen with the rest of the park.
- 1997: Former owner Garry Harris went to prison for tax evasion. The non-profit Trustees of Conneaut Lake Park group was established to take ownership of the park. Blue Streak was renovated and the park purchased four rides from the now-closed Old Indiana Fun Park: Super Round-Up, Bumper Cars, Sky Thriller, and Turbo. Turbo was never installed due to a dispute over ownership. An eight-tub model of the Flying Scooters ride was also added.
- 1999: The Trustees of Conneaut Lake Park dwindled to one member. The Conneaut Lake Park Management Group also began to operate Conneaut Lake Park. Conneaut Lake's annual Fall Pumpkin Fest was moved to the park. The park also purchased a Roll-O-Plane ride and opened it.

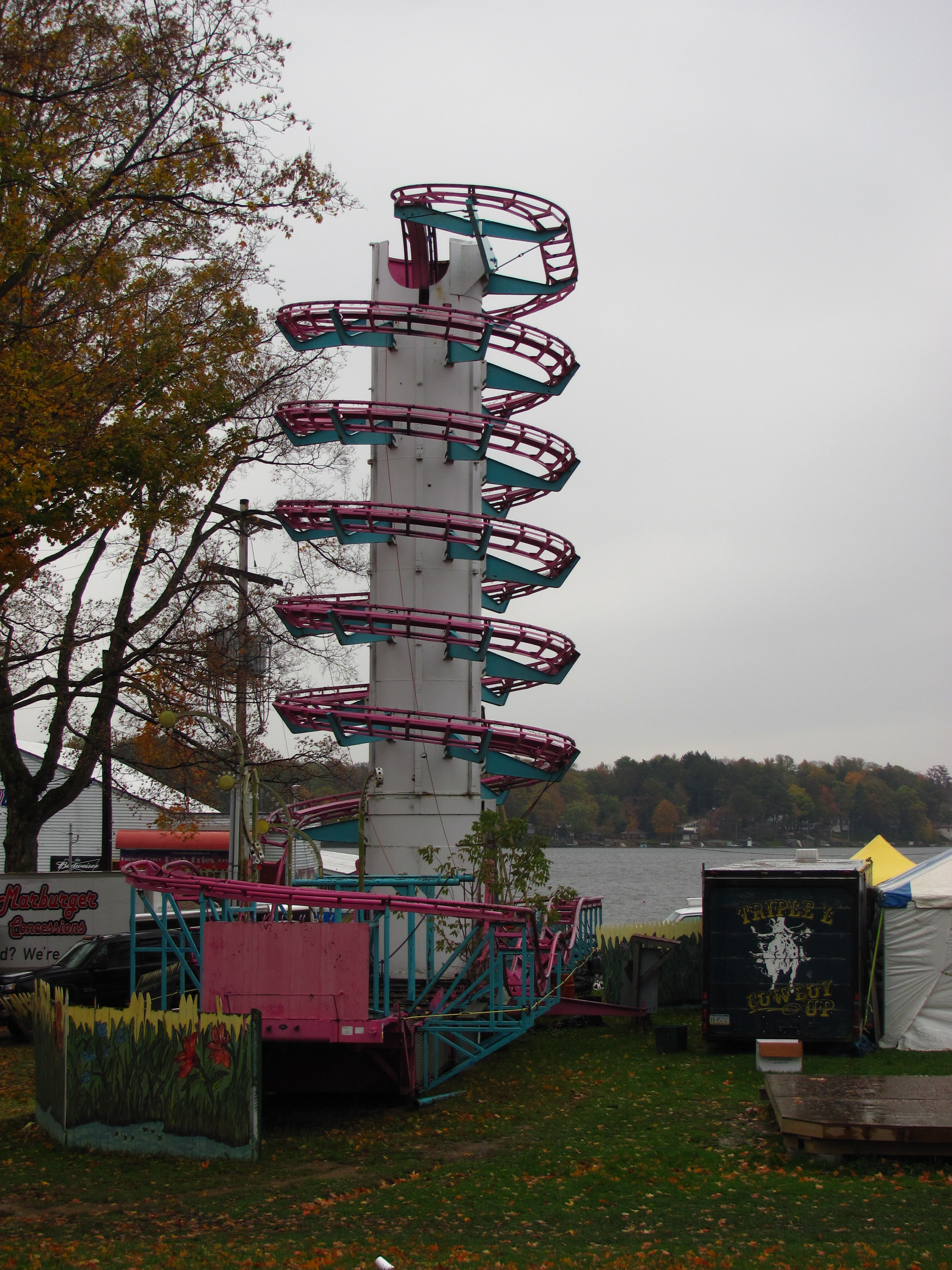
Toboggan in 2011

==== 2000s ====
- 2000: On June 28, the Conneaut Lake Park Management Group was ousted from the park, and it was closed for four days before the trustees assumed control again.
- 2001: Gene Rumsey and Mary Ellen Rebrassier managed Conneaut Lake Park for the season. Dr. Moriarity's Wild Ride was restored to its original name, The Devil's Den. Witch's Stew ride opens.
- 2002: The original 1938 trains were put back onto Blue Streak, sending the NAD Century Flyer trains from the 1960s into retirement. The park purchased and opened the Toboggan roller coaster.
- 2003: The park was approved to open the day before Memorial Day when Lake View Ford loaned Conneaut Lake Park the money it needed to open. A new board of trustees was formed on July 15. The park hosted its first annual "Holiday in the Park" event in December. A book, The Ghosts of Hotel Conneaut and Conneaut Lake Park, was written, sparking ghost hunts, television coverage, and events such as the annual Spiritual Expo at Conneaut Lake Park. Gene Rumsey resigned as park manager at the end of the season.
- 2004: Griffin Motors loaned Conneaut Lake Park the money it needed to open. Mary Ellen Rebrassier, CEO, was replaced with Don Kaltenbaugh on June 16. Tim Kaider resigned as chairman of the board of trustees and Abe Finton assumed the position. Ultimate Trip is removed.
- 2005: The park attempted to introduce a tiger animal attraction, but after a lengthy public protest from a Pittsburgh-based animal rights group, Voices for Animals, and a petition with several thousand signatures from the park's patrons, it was withdrawn later in the season. The board of trustees was ordered by Judge Vardaro to open the park for the season without borrowing any money. Don Kaltenbaugh resigned and more board members were added, including George Deshner, Dick Williams, David Gordan, and chairman Terry Deitz. Tom Cholak and Harold Thornton were hired as managers of the park. The park leased the Beach Club, Camperland, and multiple games in order to get money to open the park for the season. Trevor Samios and John Raucci were hired as Event Coordinators for the park. A new book, Images of America: Conneaut Lake Park, was published by Michael E. Costello and Arcadia Publishing, sparking renewed interest in the park. In August, the park, still under custody of the Crawford County court, had its 12-member operating board dissolved due to its failure to file a required financial report two months earlier. The park management was awarded to former school principal George Deshner and local humane society operator LeRoy Stearns.
- 2006: The Flynn house, where the Flynn family lived when they owned the park, was demolished in a controlled burn. Conneaut Lake Institute began its "Brick-by-Brick" fundraising campaign to raise funds to repair the park's ridable miniature railroad. In order to open Conneaut Lake Park in 2006, the park borrowed $250,000 against the sale of the Flynn house and 3.3 acres (13,000 m^{2}) of valuable lakefront property. The Yo-Yo ride was dismantled after sitting idle for 3 years, and was subsequently sold. The Witch's Stew ride was reintroduced. The Bessemer and Lake Erie Miniature Train reopened to the public on July 2. The park's historic Tumble Bug ride reopened to the public on July 8. Conneaut Lake Park continued to operate without a board of trustees. Deshner and Stearns announced that the park lost approximately $400,000 that season. In an attempt to pay off a large portion of the park's debt, Stearns tried to sell 3.6 acres (15,000 m^{2}) of lakefront property. The ferris wheel was retired at the end of the season. This would be the last year the Toboggan coaster operated.
- 2007: On May 22, it was announced that the resort would not open for the 2007 season due to lack of funds. The Trustees of Conneaut Lake Park had earlier attempted to raise funds through the sale of tokens, but were unsuccessful. The trustees then sought a six-figure gift to open the park, but finding no donors, announced the park would not open. $2 million in debt, the park was unable to borrow the funds needed to open.
- 2008: On February 1, the Dreamland Ballroom was destroyed by a fire. On April 6, the bowling alley collapsed. In April several scenes from the 2009 movie The Road were filmed at the park, including near the ruins of the Dreamland Ballroom.
- 2009: The resort opened on Memorial Day weekend. The amusement park opened in its entirety later in the summer.

==== 2010s ====
- 2010: The park opened with all but 4 rides functional: Blue Streak, Roll-O-Plane, Toboggan and Super Round-Up. Splash City opened on July 4. The coaster convention from ACE (American Coaster Enthusiasts) was held at the park on June 23, and Blue Streak was declared a historic coaster. An arson fire destroyed Kiddieland's restrooms. From September 2 through September 6, Blue Streak was open. The Skydiver ride closed, and was removed from the park.
- 2011: The Trustees of Conneaut Lake Park and Swank's Steel City Shows entered an agreement to assume operations for the 2011 season. Under the agreement, four new portable attractions were installed, including Jitterbug, Fun Slide, Go Gator, and Jumpin' Star. The Roll-O-Plane ride was removed from the park. After Labor Day, Swank's Steel City Shows ended the agreement with the Trustees of Conneaut Lake Park and removed their attractions and equipment. Splash City closed this season, and remained closed for six years.
- 2012: The amusement park opened on Labor Day with the following attractions in operation: Carousel, Tilt-A-Whirl, Flying Scooter, Bessemer and Lake Erie Miniature Train, Music Express, The Devil's Den, Witch's Stew, Trabant, all Kiddieland rides, and the Pony Track.
- 2013: A fire destroyed the Beach Club and Dockside Pavilion on August 1. On August 3, the new attraction, Hostile Hostel, a walk-through dark ride, opened. An opening ceremony for it was held during the filming of the pilot episode of a show titled Mission Amusement. Two women were injured while riding Blue Streak.
- 2014: The park opened on May 23. The park considered the possibility of a tax sale in September, as it owed more than $910,000 in overdue property taxes. Toboggan was removed from the park in September and put up for sale. Witch's Stew, Music Express, and the Kiddie Carousel were also put up for sale. All rides put up for sale were not sold, and remained in operation the following year, with the exception of the Toboggan, which was dismantled. In December, after many failed attempts of trying to appeal a Sheriff's sale of the park (with the sale then scheduled for December 5), the park filed for bankruptcy to stop the sale. The Super Round-Up ride was also removed from the park.
- 2015: The park opened on May 22. Despite Chapter 11 bankruptcy proceedings, the courts allowed the trustees to secure loans to open the park. The park listed 11 operating rides, plus 11 more in Kiddieland. A new pump and spout was added to the Front Gate Fountain early in the season.
- 2016: Splash City opened for the first time in six years. Several areas throughout the park were cleaned up and reopened, including the area next to Tumble Bug and the entrance to Splash City. A concessions stand was bought and placed in Splash City across from the entrance to Lazy River. The first drop of Blue Streak was re-tracked.
- 2017: The park opened on May 27 for its 125th anniversary, along with Splash City. The picnic shelters on Reed Avenue were demolished to make room for a parking lot. A new entrance for the park was constructed across from the parking lot.
- 2018: The park opened on May 26. The second drop of Blue Streak was re-tracked, and Tumble Bug was repainted. The park also announced the addition of a Ferris Wheel for the 2019 season.
- 2019: The park opened with two new rides and numerous improvements. A regular-sized Ferris Wheel was installed the end of the midway facing the lake, and a small Ferris Wheel was completely refurbished and returned to Kiddieland after an absence. Splash City's buildings and Kiddieland's carousel and boat ride received new roofs. The Bessemer and Lake Erie Miniature Train and Bumper Cars received new theming, the midway asphalt was patched, several rides and buildings were repainted, and work continued on Blue Streak. The season also saw a successful collaboration between EPACC, employees, and volunteers.

==== 2020s ====
- 2020: The park did not open for the season due to the COVID-19 pandemic.
- 2021: On March 2, U.S. Bankruptcy Court Judge Jeffery A. Deller approved the sale of Conneaut Lake Park to Keldon Holdings, LLC for the amount of $1,200,000. Keldon was ultimately the only bidder for the property. The sale was estimated to cover 60% of the park's remaining liabilities. On March 17, the new ownership announced that "blighted wood" was being removed, and that the safety of unspecified rides was being evaluated. Tumble Bug was placed into storage with the intention of returning to operation in 2022, before it was deemed beyond repair. Blue Streak was also announced to be closed for the year. Tilt-a-Whirl and Octopus were installed.
- 2022: On January 4, 2022, while Blue Streak was being demolished, a controlled burn used to dispose of the discarded wood spread to the portion of the coaster which was still standing. The coaster was destroyed in the fire, and completely demolished. No announcement of the coaster's closure had been made prior to its demolition. In March 2022, the Splash City water park was also demolished.
- 2023: Go-Karts track opens.
- 2024: The Devil's Den, Tilt-a-Whirl, Carousel, Go-Karts, Octopus, Stunt Jump, Spider Mountain, a rock wall, Jumbo Jumper, and Mini Train, as well as several haunt attractions, reopen for Conneaut Lake Park's two Halloween events, Ghost Lake and Pumpkin Fest.
- 2025: Little Dipper reopens for Pumpkin Fest following a refurbishment after several years of inactivity.
- 2026: Kiddie Turtles ride is purchased by and moved to Knoebels Amusement Resort in Elysburg, Pennsylvania. Former Bumper Cars building is demolished and remains of Pratrooper are removed. Octopus ride is removed. A new Scrambler ride is purchased and given the name The Ultimate Trip after the park's 1959 iteration of the ride. Ghost Lake is rebranded to Phantom Park.

== Current rides and attractions ==
=== Rides and attractions ===
Name	Year installed	Manufacturer	Description
Carousel	1914	T. M. Harton/D. C. Muller	An upcharge 1914 carousel manufactured by T. M. Harton, with hand-carved figures made by D. C. Muller. At one time, it featured a 1924 Artizan XA band organ, as well as a lion figure that previously operated on nearby amusement park Waldameer & Water World's former antique carousel. Operates during the summer and Pumpkin Fest.
Go-Karts	2023	Unknown	An upcharge go-kart ride. Operates during the summer, as well as during Pumpkin Fest and Phantom Park.
Jumbo Jumper	2024	Unknown	An air pillow. Operates only during Pumpkin Fest.
Little Dipper	1950	Allan Herschell Company	A steel children's roller coaster. Operates only during Pumpkin Fest. Notable for being the oldest operating steel coaster in the United States.
Mini Train/Kiddy Train	2024	Unknown	A miniature train ride for small children. Operates only during Pumpkin Fest.
Rock Wall	2024	Unknown	A climbing rock wall. Operates only during Pumpkin Fest.
Stunt Jump	2024	Unknown	A jumping attraction. Operates only during Pumpkin Fest.
The Devil's Den	1968	Pretzel Amusement Ride Company	A gravity-powered dark ride. Operates only during Pumpkin Fest and Phantom Park.
The Ultimate Trip	2026	Eli Bridge Company	An enclosed Scrambler ride. Operates only during Pumpkin Fest and Phantom Park. Named after the previous iteration of the ride which operated at the park from 1959 to 2004.
Tilt-a-Whirl	2021	Sellner Manufacturing	A Tilt-A-Whirl ride. Operates only during Pumpkin Fest and Phantom Park.

== Former rides and attractions ==
=== Roller coasters ===
Name	Year installed	Year removed	Manufacturer	Description
Blue Streak	1938	2022	Ed Vettel	A wooden out-and-back roller coaster. Received the ACE Coaster Classic and Coaster Landmark awards in 2010. Operated inconsistently for decades and last operated in 2019.
Go Gator	2011	2011	Wisdom Rides	A steel children's roller coaster
Jack Rabbit	1902	1936	Frederick Ingersoll	A wooden roller coaster. Originally opened as "Three Way Figure Eight Toboggan Slide". Extensively damaged by a fire on December 2, 1908, but was repaired and reopened.
Scenic Railway	1909	1937	T. M. Harton	A wooden out-and-back roller coaster. Parts of it may have been reused in the construction of Blue Streak.
Toboggan	2002	2014	Chance Rides	A steel Toboggan roller coaster
Virginia Reel	1911	1920	Unknown	A wooden spinning roller coaster (Virginia Reel)
Wild Mouse	1961	1990	B.A. Schiff & Associates	A steel Wild Mouse spinning roller coaster

=== Dark rides ===
Name	Year installed	Year removed	Manufacturer	Description
Crazy Maze	1950	1961	Unknown	Walkthrough attraction
Dracula's Cave/Pit of Death	1973-1974	1985	Unknown	Dark ride
Fun House	1961	1975	Unknown	Walkthrough attraction
Hostile Hostel	2013	Unknown	Unknown	Walkthrough attraction
Pretzel	Unknown	1966	Pretzel Amusement Ride Company	Dark ride

=== Rides and attractions ===
Name	Year installed	Year removed	Manufacturer	Type
Bessemer and Lake Erie Miniature Railway	1968	2020-2021	Allan Herschell Company	Scenic train ride
Bumper Cars	1997	2020-2021	S.D.C.	Bumper cars
Calypso	1972	1980	Mack Rides	Calypso
Caterpillar	Unknown	Unknown	Allan Herschell Company	Caterpillar
Cuddle-Up	Unknown	Unknown	Unknown	Cuddle-Up
Dodg'ems/Dodgem	1923	Unknown	Unknown	Bumper cars
Ferris Wheel	2019	2020-2021	Eli Bridge Company	Ferris wheel
Flying Cages	Unknown	Unknown	Unknown	Flying cages
Flying Coaster	Unknown	Unknown	Aeroaffiliates	Flying Coaster
Flying Scooters	Unknown	1980	Bisch-Rocco	Flying Scooters
Flying Scooters	1997	2020-2021	Bisch-Rocco	Flying Scooters
Hell Hole/Hell-Hole	1976	1992	Unknown	Rotor
Jungle Cruise/Jungle Cruise Ride	1962	Unknown	Unknown	Boat ride
Mini Golf in the Park	Unknown	Unknown	Unknown	Miniature golf course
Moon Rocket	Unknown	Unknown	Allan Herschell Company	Moon Rocket
Music Express	2001	Unknown	Ramagosa	Music Express
Octopus	2021	2025	Eyerly Aircraft Company	Octopus
Original Carousel	1899	Unknown	Unknown	Carousel
Original Ferris Wheel	1949	Unknown	Unknown	Ferris wheel
Paratrooper	1981	2019	Frank Hrubetz & Company	Paratrooper
Roll-O-Plane	1999	2011	Eyerly Aircraft Company	Roll-O-Plane
Sea Dragon	Unknown	Unknown	Chance Rides	Swinging ship
Sky Thriller	1997	Unknown	HUSS Park Atttractions	Ranger
Skydiver	Unknown	Unknown	Chance Rides	Skydiver
Spider Mountain	2024	2025	Unknown	Inflatable climbing and sliding attraction
Super Round-Up/Round Up	1997	Unknown	Frank Hrubetz & Company	Round-Up
Tilt-A-Whirl	1949	2020-2021	Sellner Manufacturing	Tilt-A-Whirl
Trabant	1997	2024	Chance Morgan	Trabant
Tumble Bug/Swamp Bug	1925	2020-2021	Traver Engineering Company	Tumble Bug
Twister	Unknown	Unknown	Allan Herschell Company	Twister
Ultimate Trip	1959	2004	Eli Bridge Company	Scrambler
Witch's Stew	2001	2020-2021	Watkins	Tempest
Yo-Yo/Yo Yo	1981	Unknown	Chance Rides	Yo Yo/Swing Ride

== Splash City ==
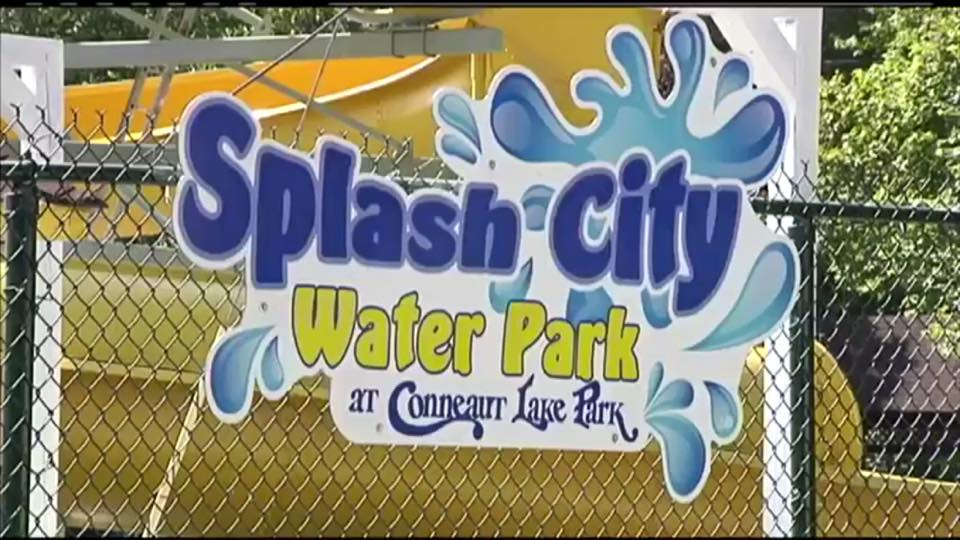
Splash City entrance sign in 2016

=== Former Splash City attractions ===
Name	Year installed	Year removed	Type	Description
Cliffhanger Falls	1986	2022	Water slides	Two 415-foot-long water slides. To get to the top, riders climbed several sets of stairs, up a 48-foot-tall tower.
Connie Otter's Kiddie Cove	1991	2022	Children's pool	A children's splash pool with three attractions. These included a small water slide, a waterfall, and a fountain in the center of the pool. It was located directly behind Cliffhanger Falls.
Otter Creek Adventure River	1991	2022	Lazy river	A 160,000 gallon lazy river ride, with other water effects including a mushroom sprinkler and waterfall.

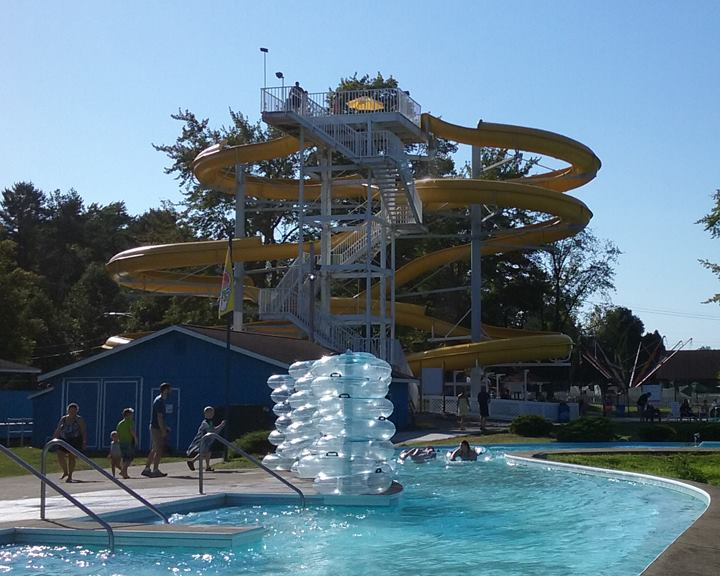
Otter Creek Adventure River and Cliffhanger Falls in 2017

Splash City was a water park located in the middle of the park. It contained three attractions: Cliffhanger Falls, a pair of water slides; Connie Otter's Kiddie Cove, a children's area; and Otter Creek Adventure River, a lazy river. There were also two decks on the island of the lazy river for sunbathing. They could be accessed by a bridge on the right end of the lazy river. The slides were added in 1986, and the rest of the water park was added in 1991. Splash City operated from 1986 to 1994, 1996–2006, and 2009–2010. The water park sat idle from 2011 to 2016. In October 2015, the park announced Splash City would be reopening in 2016. On May 28, 2016, Otter Creek River Adventure reopened to the public. On August 6, 2016, both Cliffhanger Falls and Connie Otter's Kiddie Cove reopened to the public. In March 2022, Splash City was demolished. Only a portion of the Cliffhanger Falls water slide remained standing, which was later torn down.

== Kiddieland ==
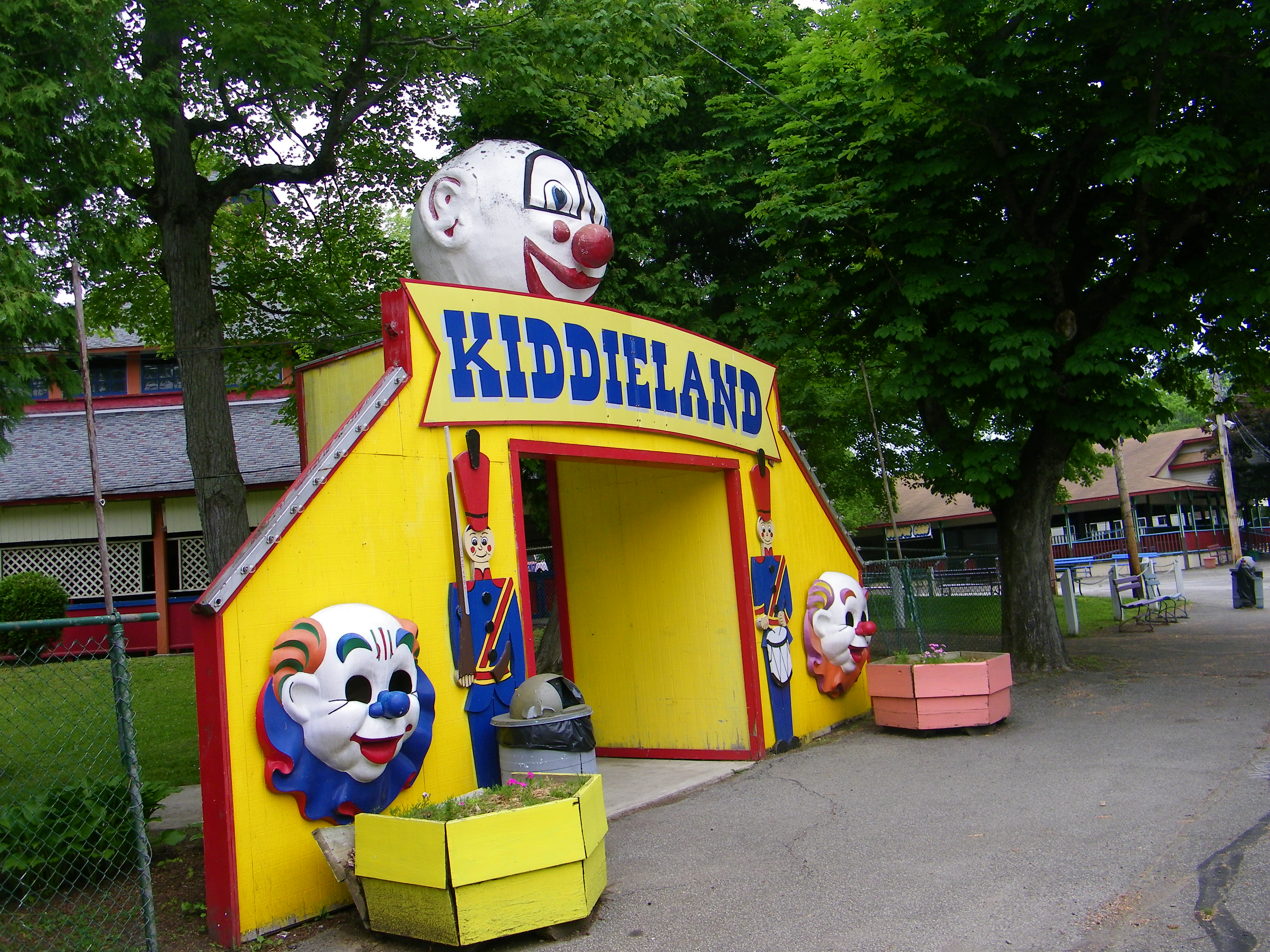
Kiddieland entrance in 2014

Kiddieland was a small, enclosed section of the park, containing rides specifically for children. It was located behind the Carousel and across from the Witch's Stew and Trabant. The original Kiddieland restrooms were destroyed by an arson fire in 2010. They have since been rebuilt.

The Kiddieland section of the park also offered pony rides in a small, circular, tethered track known as Pony Track.

=== Former Kiddieland rides ===
Name	Years of operation	Manufacturer	Type	Notes
Boats/Boat Ride	Unknown	Unknown	Miniature spinning ride	
Dune Buggy	Unknown	Unknown	Miniature spinning ride	
Fairyland Forest	Unknown	Unknown	Walkthrough attraction	
Fun Slide	Unknown	Unknown	Slide	
Jeeps/G.I. Joe Jeeps/Beetle Bailey Jeeps	Unknown	Allan Herschell Company	Miniature spinning ride	
Hot Pursuit	Unknown	Unknown	Miniature spinning ride	
Jitterbug	Unknown	Unknown	Miniature spinning ride	
Jolly Caterpillar	1978 or later–2017 or earlier	Allan Herschell Company	Miniature spinning ride	Previously operated at West View Park in West View, Pennsylvania until the park's 1977 closure
Jumpin' Star	Unknown	Unknown	Miniature dropping ride	
Kiddie Carousel/Kiddieland Carousel	1969–1991, 2002–unknown	Allan Herschell Company	Miniature carousel	
Kiddie Ferris Wheel	Unknown	Unknown	Miniature Ferris wheel	
Pony Parade	Unknown	Unknown	Miniature spinning ride	
Pony Track	Unknown	Unknown	Pony ride	
Saturn Shuttle	Unknown	Unknown	Miniature spinning ride	
Stunt Jump	Unknown	Unknown	Air pillow	
Swings	Unknown	Unknown	Swings	
Tot-Gun	Unknown	Unknown	Miniature spinning ride	
Tubs-O-Fun/Tubs of Fun	Unknown	Unknown	Miniature spinning ride	
Turnpike Cruiser	Unknown	Unknown	Miniature car ride	
Turtle/Kiddie Turtles	Unknown	R. E. Chambers Company	Miniature spinning ride	Has since been moved to Knoebels Amusement Resort in Elysburg, Pennsylvania
Water Otters	Unknown	Unknown	Miniature spinning ride	
