= Toboggan (roller coaster) =

Roller coaster model

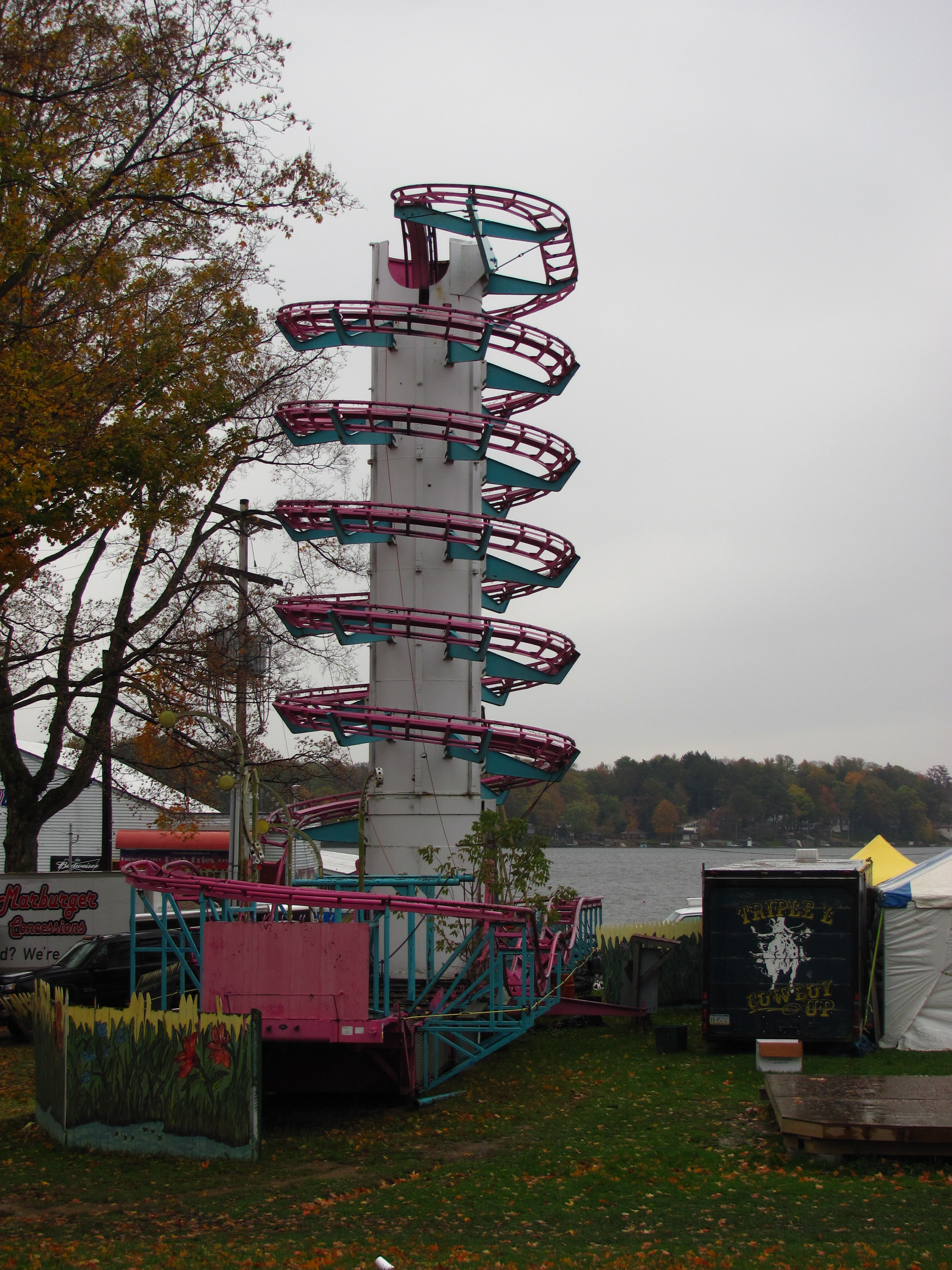
- A disused Toboggan at Conneaut Lake Park
- Status: Discontinued
- First manufactured: 1969
- No. of installations: 32
- Manufacturer: Chance Industries
- Height: 45 ft (14 m)
- Length: 450 ft (140 m)
- Riders per vehicle: 2
- Toboggan at RCDB

Toboggan at Little Amerricka

A Toboggan is a portable roller coaster model that was produced by Chance Rides (then Chance Industries) from 1969 to the mid-1970s. The coaster features a small ride vehicle which can hold a maximum of two people. The ride stands 45 feet tall with a track length of 450 feet.

== History ==
The coaster was invented by Walter House of Amarillo, Texas. Chance acquired the manufacturing rights and began producing it in 1969. The coaster was designed to be a carnival ride, fitting on two trailers, but several units were purchased by amusement parks where they were set up as permanent attractions. When the ride was first sold in 1969, it had a price tag of $35,000. Chance built 32 Toboggans, four of which still operate as permanent attractions at amusement parks. A few can also be found at traveling carnivals throughout the world.

== Ride experience ==
Riders sit in an enclosed car. The car climbs vertically inside a hollow steel tower, then spirals back down around the outside of the same tower. Each vehicle has a single rubber tire with a hydraulic clutch braking system that governs the speed of the vehicle as it descends the tower. The rubber tire engages a center rail that begins halfway through the first spiral. There is a small section of track at the base of the tower with three small dips and two turns to bring the ride vehicle back to the station. A typical ride cycle lasts approximately 70 seconds.

== Installations ==
The following is a list of parks and traveling carnivals that are known to have operated a Chance Toboggan.

Ride name	Park/carnival	Years operated	Notes
Toboggan	Adventureland	1973-1979	Sold to Moreno's Park, a traveling carnival in 1979
Space Moon	Animália Park	2023-present	Purchased from Moreno's Park
Toboggan	Arnolds Park	1998	Sold to Grand Prix Amusements in 1998
Swiss Toboggan	Boblo Island Amusement Park	1969-1978	
N/A	Cal Expo Amusement Park	1975-1979	
Toboggan	Casino Pier	1970	
Toboggan	Central Pier Arcade & Speedway	1972-1984	Featured in the movie The King of Marvin Gardens
Toboggan	Clacton Pier	2009	Purchased from Great Yarmouth Pleasure Beach
Toboggan	Conneaut Lake Park	2002-2006	Purchased from a traveling carnival in Texas. Remained SBNO until 2014, when it was dismantled and its remains left in a parking lot. It remained there until 2022.
Arctic Cat	Crystal Beach Park	1974	
N/A	Deggeller Shows	N/A	Sold to Lakemont Park
Earthquake McGoon's Brain Rattler	Dogpatch USA	1969-73	Sold to Seven Peaks Water Park Duneland
Toboggan	Family Kingdom Amusement Park (then known as Grand Strand Amusement Park)	1968-1970s	
N/A	Familyland	1972-1982	
Toboggan	Funtown Pier	1970s	
Toboggan	Ghost Town Village	1980	
Toboggan	Grand Prix Amusements	1999-2005	Purchased from Arnolds Park in 1998
Toboggan	Great Adventure Amusement Park	1978	
Toboggan	Great Yarmouth Pleasure Beach	1993-2000	Sold to Clacton's Pier
Toboggan	Hersheypark	1972-1977	One of two identical Toboggans which operated at the park
Toboggan	Hersheypark	1972-1977	One of two identical Toboggans which operated at the park
Toboggan	Huaycha Centro Recreativo	2022-present	Purchased from Lakemont Park
Swiss Toboggan	In The Game Funtrackers	1978-1984	
Toboggan	Jenkinson's Boardwalk	1980s	
Toboggan	Lakemont Park	1991-2016	Previously operated with Deggeller Shows. SBNO from 2017 to 2018.
N/A	Landgraf France	N/A	Operated for a season at Luna Park La Palmyre
Swiss Toboggan	Little Amerricka	1993-present	Purchased from Seven Peaks Water Park Duneland
N/A	Merimbula's Magic Mountain	N/A	
Zeppelin	Moreno's Park	N/A	Purchased from Adventureland in 1979
Toboggan	Old Chicago	1975-1980	
Toboggan	Palace and Casino Amusements	N/A	
Star Wars	Parc Avenue	N/A-2003	
Toboggan	Parc Belmont	1970s-1983	
Toboggan	Parque de Diveriones Anita Nueva Aventura	2015-present	
Toboggan	Playland Park	N/A-1979	
Toboggan	Queens Park	1970-1972	
Swiss Toboggan	Santa's Village Amusement and Water Park (then known as Santa's Village)	1971-N/A	
Toboggan	Seven Peaks Water Park Duneland (then known as Enchanted Forest)	N/A-1990	Purchased from Dogpatch USA, sold to Little Amerricka
Toboggan	Shaheen's Fun-O-Rama Park	N/A	
Swamp Buggy	Six Flags AstroWorld	1970-1972	
Toboggan	Skerbeck Family Carnival	N/A-2022	
Toboggan	Sportland Pier	1966-1970	
Toboggan	Stewart Beach Park	1980s-1989	
Toboggan	Trimper Rides	1970s-2009	
N/A	Upper Peninsula State Fair	N/A	
N/A	Xingqinggong Park	N/A	

== See also ==
- Skydiver (ride) – Ferris wheel variant using passenger vehicles similar to the Toboggan
