= Toboggan (Conneaut Lake Park) =

Former roller coaster at Conneaut Lake Park

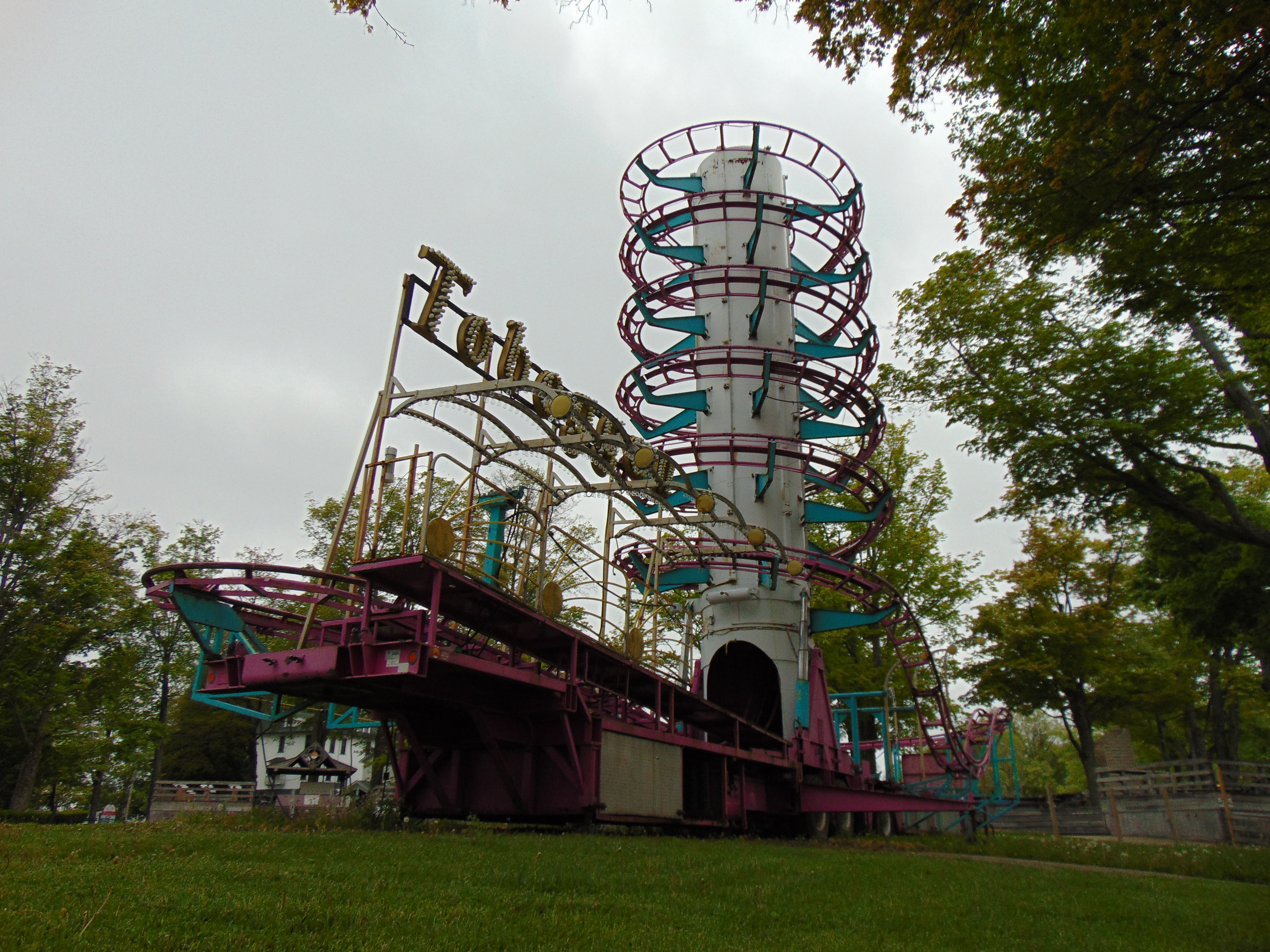

Conneaut Lake Park
- Location: Conneaut Lake Park
- Coordinates: 41.634141°N 80.313679°W
- Status: Removed
- Opening date: 2002
- Closing date: 2006

General statistics
- Type: Steel
- Manufacturer: Chance Rides
- Model: Toboggan
- Height: 45 ft (14 m)
- Length: 450 ft (140 m)
- Duration: 1:10
- Toboggan at RCDB

Toboggan was a steel roller coaster located at Conneaut Lake Park in Conneaut Lake, Pennsylvania. Purchased from a previous owner in Texas, the ride opened at the park in 2002, where it operated until 2006. It was located near the midway area of the park, close to the site of the former Dreamland Ballroom. After standing inactive for eight years, the roller coaster was dismantled and moved into storage following the 2014 season.

== Ride experience ==
The coaster was a portable Toboggan manufactured by Chance Industries. It featured a small car that can hold two people, which climbed vertically inside a hollow steel tower then spiraled back down around the same tower. There was a small section of track at the base of the tower with a few small dips and two turns to bring the car back to the station. Each vehicle had a single rubber tire with a hydraulic clutch braking system that governed the speed of the vehicle as it descended the tower. The rubber tire engaged a center rail that began halfway through the first spiral. The ride stood 45 feet tall with a track length of 450 feet. A typical ride lasted approximately 70 seconds.
