= Toboggan (Lakemont Park) =

Former roller coaster in Altoona, Pennsylvania

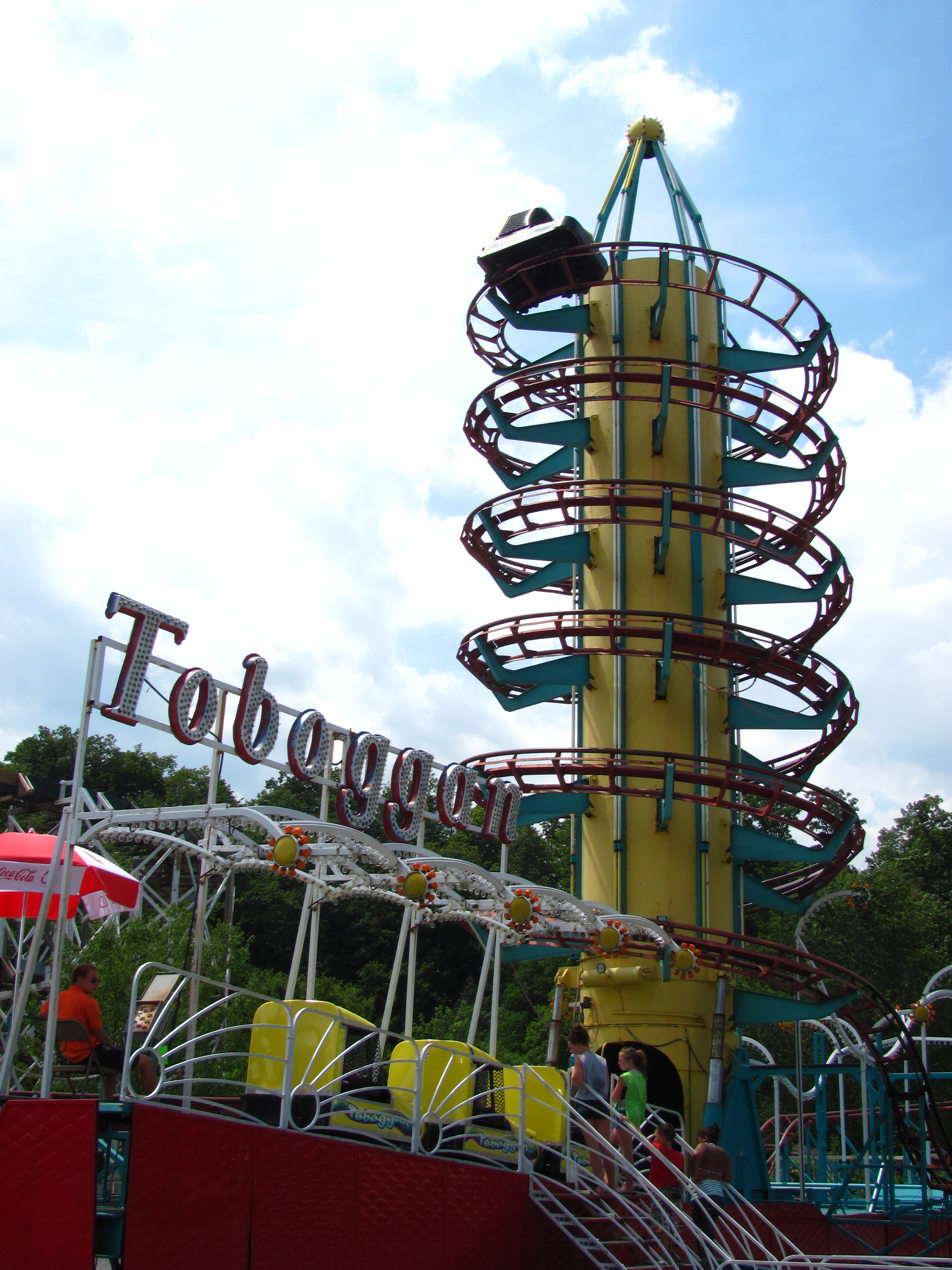

Lakemont Park
- Location: Lakemont Park
- Coordinates: 40.47118°N 78.39606°W
- Status: Removed
- Opening date: 1991
- Closing date: 2016

General statistics
- Type: Steel
- Manufacturer: Chance Rides
- Model: Toboggan
- Height: 45 ft (14 m)
- Length: 450 ft (140 m)
- Trains: 4 trains with a single car; riders arranged 2 across in a single row for a total of 2 riders per train
- Toboggan at RCDB

Toboggan was a steel roller coaster located at Lakemont Park in Altoona, Pennsylvania. It was a portable steel coaster built by Chance Rides, and was one of many of their Toboggan installations across the United States. This specific Toboggan had previously traveled in Florida with Deggeller Shows before it opened at Lakemont Park. It operated at Lakemont Park from 1991 to 2016, and remained standing but not operating until 2018. It was eventually sold to Huaycha Centro Recreativo in Peru, where it reopened in 2022 under the same name and has operated there ever since.

== Ride experience ==
The ride featured an enclosed car which, after climbing up a 45 foot vertical lift inside a hollow steel structure, spun downward on a continuous helix around the structure, before it turned, went over two small airtime hills, and turned again, back into the station. One ride cycle lasted approximately 70 seconds and the ride contained 450 feet of track.
