= Zipper (ride) =

Amusement ride invented by Joseph Brown

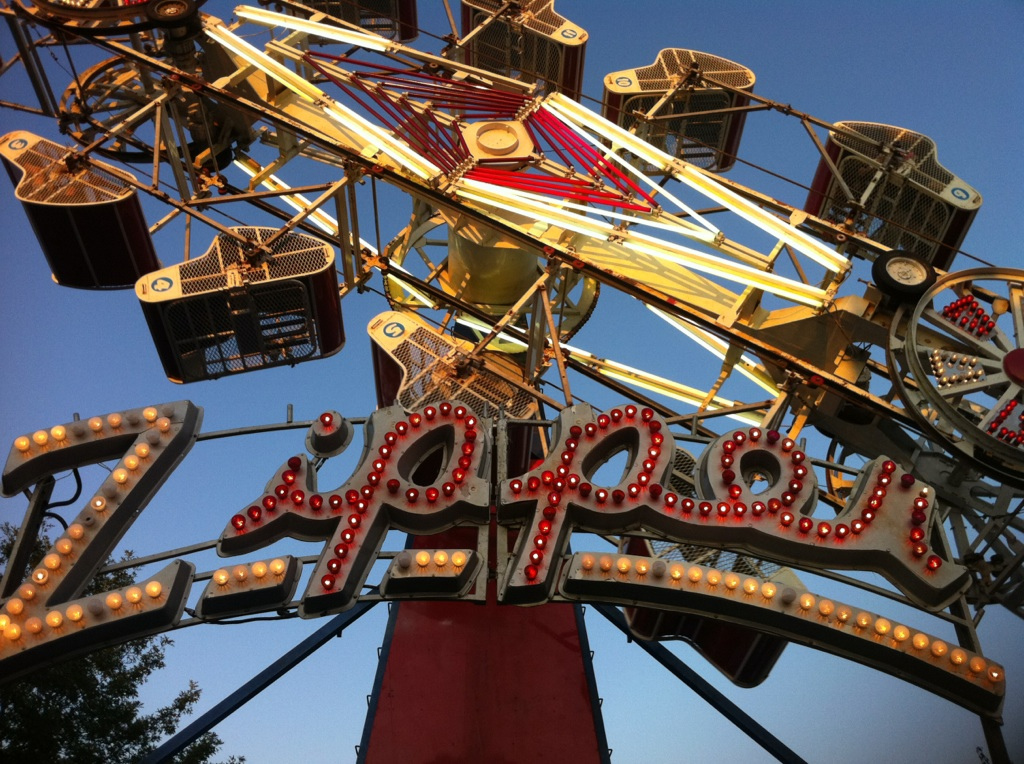
Zipper operating at Kent Island, Maryland

The Zipper is an amusement ride designed by Joseph Brown under Chance Rides in 1968. Popular at carnivals and fairs in the United States, Canada, Australia, Mexico and New Zealand, it features strong vertical G-forces, numerous spins, and a noted sense of unpredictability. Chance Rides had manufactured the ride continuously from 1968 to 2001. In 2015, Chance built a Zipper for Skinner's Amusements. Since its debut, 222 models were produced. Only one of these was specifically designed for an amusement park, Galaxyland, at the West Edmonton Mall in Edmonton, Alberta, Canada. However, it was eventually removed due to frequent breakdowns as this ride was not designed for full-time operation. In 2025, Chance Rides announced they were resuming production on several rides including the Zipper.

Most models of the Zipper follow a similar basic format: A long, rotating, oblong boom with a cable around its edge that pulls 12 cars around the ride. Except at peak times, most operators will only fill half of the cars at one time with riders. Like most carnival equipment, the ride is designed to be portable; it can be disassembled onto a truck and transported from site to site.

Though a staple of amusement parks and carnivals, the original models of this ride garnered a reputation for being unsafe due to their rough nature, and a series of deaths on the rides in the late 1970s after car doors came unlatched led to a series of revisions, primarily restructuring of the door lock system. Nevertheless, the ride has amassed a cult following over its decades in operation, and was named by Popular Mechanics as one of the strangest amusement park rides in the world.

== History ==
The Zipper was created by Joseph Brown under Chance Rides in 1968 in Wichita, Kansas, and registered under patent 3,596,905 in 1971. The ride's basic design was based on an earlier ride called The Swooper, invented in 1928, which also featured a series of cars being pulled along a cable around an oblong framework. The central difference between The Swooper and the Zipper was the ability of the Zipper's frame to rotate as the cars travel along it by cable.

== Description ==
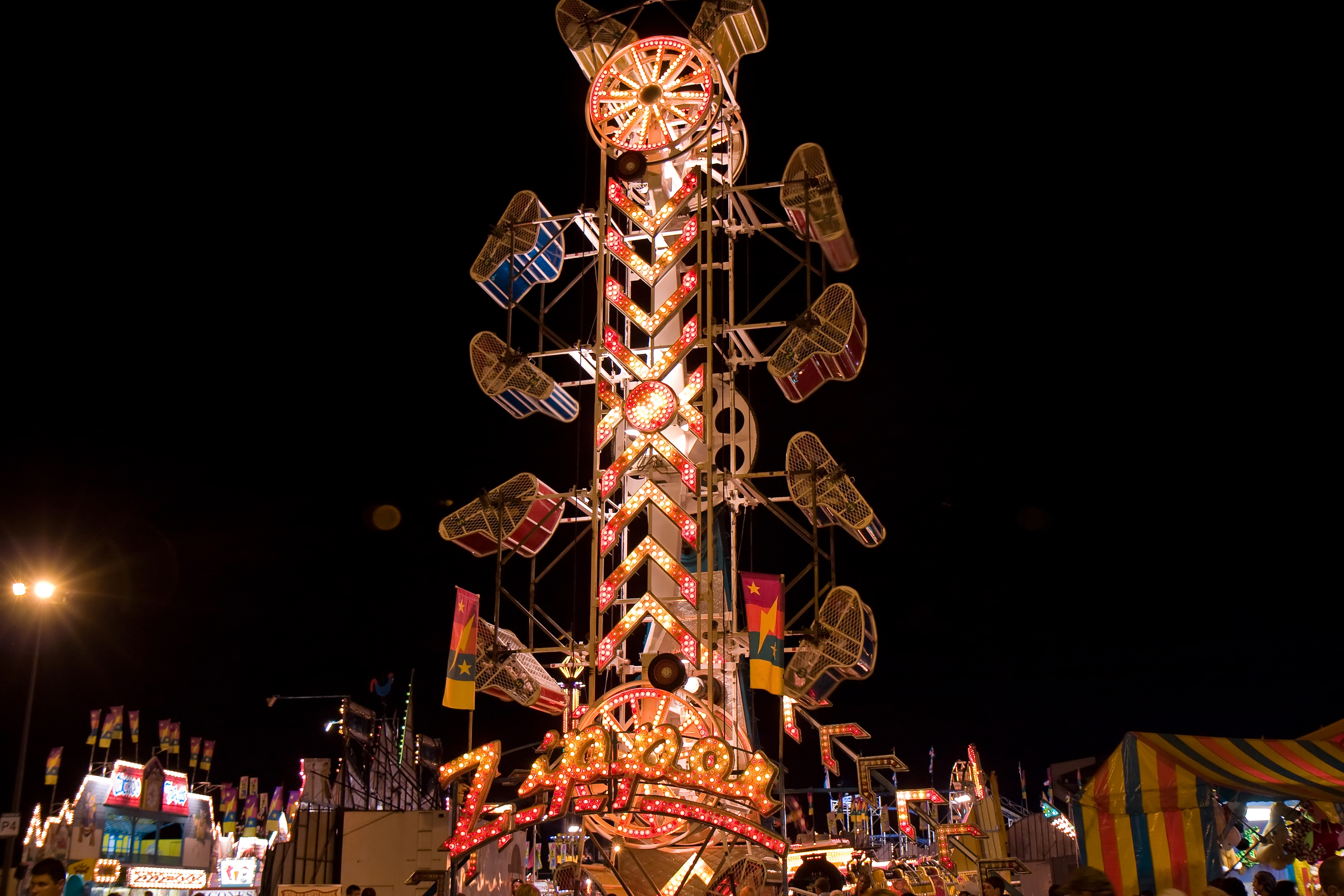
Zipper operating at night

The Zipper has a long oblong frame (the boom) that rotates like a Ferris wheel, with free-flipping cars suspended on off-center axes that move around the sides of the boom via a pulley system. Each passenger capsule is essentially a bench seat that snugly fits two people, built into a compartment of metal mesh contoured to protect the riders' entire bodies. The odd, apostrophe-shaped capsules, spaced evenly along the perimeter of the boom, look very much like the rows of interlocking teeth on a zipper, the characteristic for which the ride was named.

The passenger capsules travel around the perimeter of the boom at 4 revolutions per minute (rpm), allowing the compartments to flip at each end of the boom. The boom itself rotates at 7.5 rpm in the same direction as the pulley system. This combined but offset rotation provides each capsule with a unique experience. These rides rotate both clockwise and counter-clockwise, and most are run with several rotations in each direction constituting one ride.

The restraint system for the riders are a lap bar and bars to hang on to. Not holding on to this bar when the ride suddenly jerks can cause a rider's head to hit the door in front of them.

== Safety issues and revisions ==
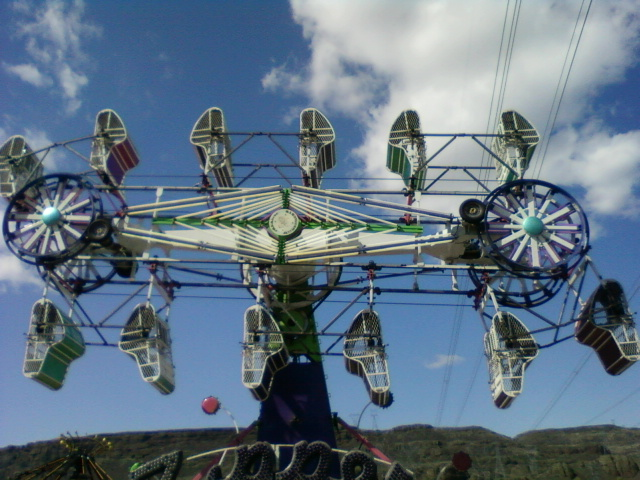
Original 1970s Zipper on its horizontal side

The first fourteen Zippers manufactured spun at much higher speeds than modern models. The boom rotated at 11 rpm and the cable system at 7 rpm. These first-generation rides kept the passenger compartments spinning on their axes constantly, creating unsafe g-forces and causing impact-related injuries such as whiplash, bruises and back injuries. The safety hazard was quickly discovered and the mechanical rpms were permanently lowered to current speeds.

On September 7, 1977, the U.S. Consumer Product Safety Commission issued a public warning, urging carnival-goers not to ride the Zipper after four deaths occurred due to compartment doors opening mid-ride. The safety restraints being attached to the door itself, riders are left unrestrained whenever the door is open. The four victims all died after falling from their compartments. The failure was traced to original spring-close latches on the doors wearing out and not being replaced. Compartments on currently operating Zippers are secured using the original latch, a redundant latch approved by the CPSC, and a large R-Key pin as a second backup.

Despite these new safety features, the same scenario was repeated in July 2006 in Hinckley, Minnesota, when two teenage girls were ejected from their compartment as the door swung open. Their door was apparently not properly closed by the operator who admitted to local law enforcement that he had not inserted the safety pin (R-Key) before starting the ride. Both of the victims, Erica Matrious and Breanna Larsen, survived the incident despite facing some serious injuries.

Many newer models of the ride have solved this problem by completely restructuring the door lock system, also eliminating the need for an R-key. These newer models have also increased the weight of the compartments, reducing the spinning, which decreases pressure on the door latches.

Zipper operators are encouraged to employ a "no single rider" policy. The manufacturer's concern was that a person riding alone might turn sideways in the seat and remove their legs from underneath the lap bar, risking serious injury as the capsule spun. The manufacturer sent out a bulletin to Zipper owners in 1995 pointing out the risk.

== Ride specifications ==
Duration

- Ride duration (recommended): 2 minutes
- Ride duration (maximum): 2.5 minutes

Dimensions

- Maximum height: 56 feet (17.1 m)
- Total ride weight: 43,000 pounds (19,500 kg)

Passenger detail

- Number of passenger compartments: Anywhere ranging from 4 to 16 seats
- Passengers per seat: 2 adults or 3 children
- Maximum passenger weight per seat: 500 pounds (227 kg)
- Total passengers: Maximum 24 adults or 36 children (12-seat Zipper)
- Maximum total passenger weight: 4,080 pounds (1,851 kg) (12-seat Zipper)
- Height requirement: 48 Inches (122 cm)

Mechanical speed

- Boom: 7.5 RPM (formerly 11 RPM, see above)
- Cable: 4.0 RPM (formerly 7 RPM, see above)

Direction of travel

- Boom: travels clockwise or counter-clockwise
- Cable: travels clockwise or counter-clockwise

Power requirements

- Boom drive: Electro-hydraulic
- Cable Drive: Electro-hydraulic
- Power rating: 54 horsepower (40 kW)
- Suspension type: Air ride

== In popular culture ==
In 2012, a documentary titled ZIPPER: Coney Island's Last Wild Ride was made, dealing with the ride's eventual removal at Coney Island and the economical reasons behind it.

Recording artist Michael Jackson operated a Zipper at his Neverland Ranch. He claimed to hold the world record for riding the longest at 35 minutes during the early 2000s. After Jackson's death in 2009, the ride—among several others—was auctioned with his estate, and began traveling with carnivals across the country, advertised as a piece of history.

In Diary of a Wimpy Kid: Dog Days, Greg Heffley rides a version of the Zipper called the "Cranium Shaker". The ride also appears in the movie version, as well as the Poptropica island, Wimpy Boardwalk island, but the ride is different from its book counterpart, as it is instead modeled after a Booster amusement ride. The Booster ride used during filming was the now-defunct "Revelation" at Playland in Vancouver, Canada, as there were no Zipper-based amusement rides in the Vancouver area, where the film was shot.

== See also ==
- Skydiver (ride)
- Swing ride
- Rock-O-Plane
