= Blue Streak (Conneaut Lake) =

Former roller coaster located in Pennsylvania, USA

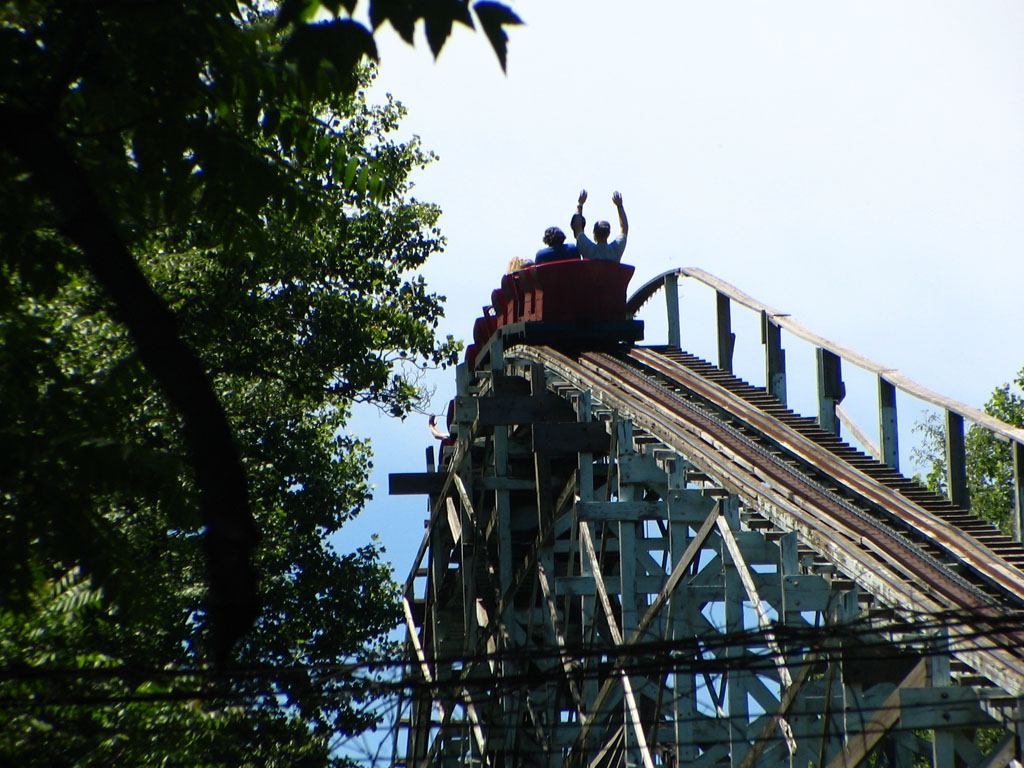
- The ride at the top of the lift hill in 2006

Conneaut Lake Park
- Location: Conneaut Lake Park
- Coordinates: 41.6349°N 80.3180°W
- Status: Removed
- Opening date: May 23, 1938
- Closing date: 2019

General statistics
- Type: Wood
- Designer: Ed Vettel
- Model: Out-and-back
- Height: 78 ft (24 m)
- Length: 2,900 ft (880 m)
- Speed: 50 mph (80 km/h)
- Inversions: 0
- Duration: 2:20
- Trains: Single train with 3 cars; riders arranged 2 across in 3 rows for a total of 18 riders per train
- Blue Streak at RCDB

Video

Blue Streak was a wooden roller coaster built in 1938 at Conneaut Lake Park in Conneaut Lake, Pennsylvania. It was the only wooden coaster operating in the park, as well as the largest. Blue Streak followed an out and back design. It was the 17th oldest wooden roller coaster in the United States, and it was one of two shallow coasters designed by Edward Vettel still in operation in 2019. Blue Streak opened in 1938, and operated inconsistently until 2019. It stood out of operation until 2022, when it was destroyed in a fire during demolition.

== History ==
Blue Streak underwent major renovations in 1997, 2002, and 2010.

The ride opened in 1938 with two Vettel trains. In the mid-1960s, these trains were retired and replaced by two National Amusement Devices (NAD) Century Flyer trains. In 2002, one of the Vettel trains was returned to service, replacing the NAD trains. In 2010, the ride returned one of the NAD trains to operation. The other NAD train was lost in the 2013 Beach Club fire, as it was being stored in the basement of the Beach Club. The Vettel train was removed from operation in 2011, pending repairs and restraint updates. It was stored in the station on display until the ride's demolition. The turnaround section of track was also rebuilt in 2011. For the 2016 season, the first drop was repaired and re-tracked. In 2018, the second drop was repaired and re-tracked. The ride received salvaged lumber from the Geauga Lake Raging Wolf Bobs coaster.

Blue Streak was open and closed many times throughout its existence. The dates are as follows:

- Originally opened: May 23, 1938
- Closed: 1995–1996
- Reopened: May 17, 1997
- Closed: 2007–September 1, 2010
- Reopened: September 2, 2010
- Final closure: Closed after the 2019 operating season. Stood out of operation from 2020–2022.

On June 24, 2010, the American Coaster Enthusiasts donated a plaque that declared Blue Streak a Coaster Classic and a Coaster Landmark.

On January 4, 2022, during demolition of the ride, Blue Streak caught on fire.

== Ride experience ==
Upon leaving the station, the train immediately entered a tunnel in the shape of an “S" and began a 78 foot (24 m) climb up the lift hill. The train plummeted down the first drop, reaching up to a top speed of 50 mph (80 km/h), and went into a straightaway section of track. The straightaway was followed by two medium size hills, then a turnaround section that featured a slight dip as it turned the train back towards the station. The train then followed four smaller camel back hills, providing airtime, then entering the brake run and making a 180 degree turn back into the station.

== Awards ==
Golden Ticket Awards: Top wood Roller Coasters
Year									1998	1999
Ranking									25	–
Year	2000	2001	2002	2003	2004	2005	2006	2007	2008	2009
Ranking	–	–	–	–	–	–	–	–	–	–
Year	2010	2011	2012	2013	2014	2015	2016	2017	2018	2019
Ranking	–	46	44	33	30	35	38	37	37	40
Year	2020	2021	2022	2023	2024	2025	2026			
Ranking	N/A	35	–	–	–	–	–			

== Incidents ==
- On July 24, 1949, a 40-year-old man was killed after falling 20 feet (6.1 m) from the ride. Park officials stated that the safety restraints were not properly secured.
- On October 29, 2013, two women were injured after riding the roller coaster. Reports have said that they may have hit their faces on the lap bar during their ride.
