= Mattel City =

Upcoming theme park in the United States

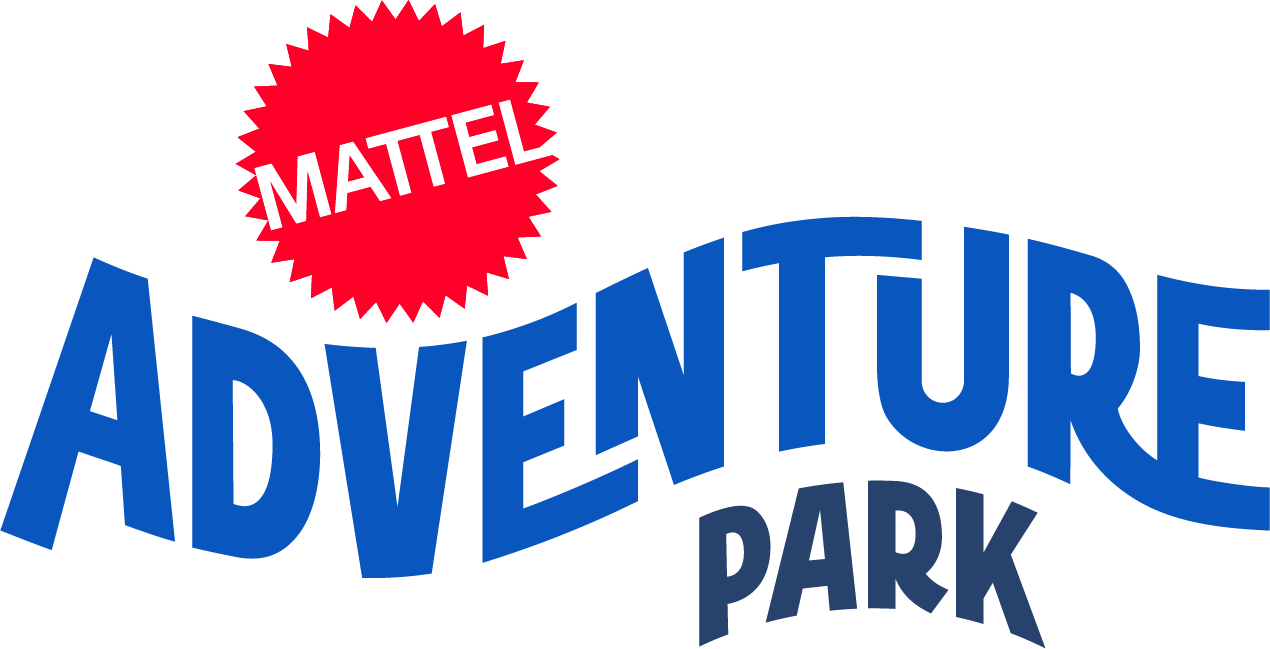
- Interactive map of Mattel City
- Location: VAI Resort, Glendale, Arizona, United States; Bonner Springs, Kansas City, Kansas, United States
- Coordinates: 33°31′15″N 112°16′0″W
- Status: Under construction
- Opens: Arizona: 2027 (planned); Bonner Springs: 2031 (planned)
- Owner: Epic Resort Destinations
- Operated by: VAI Resorts (Arizona); Epic Resort Destinations (Kansas)
- Website: Mattel City; Mattel Adventure Park

Mattel City and Mattel Adventure Park are upcoming theme parks under construction in Glendale, Arizona, a suburb in the metropolitan area of Phoenix, as well as in Bonner Springs, Kansas. In Phoenix, it is planned to be an addition of the nearby VAI Resort. It will be the first real-world attraction to feature properties adapted from toys and games manufactured by Mattel, as well as Arizona's first fully themed indoor/outdoor amusement park. The Arizona park is currently planned to open in 2027, while the Bonner Springs park is currently planned to open no later than 2031.

== History ==
Mattel Adventure Park under construction in September 2026

The park was first announced in 2021 with an opening date in 2022, which was pushed back to 2023 and later 2024. In November 2024, the park's opening was delayed again, until 2025, because construction of the Barbie Beach House and Hot Wheels roller coasters was taking longer than expected. Construction of Twin Mill Racer was stopped due to a billboard sitting directly in the path of the rollercoasters planned layout.

In February 2025, the park in Glendale, Arizona was announced to open in late 2025, but by September of that year, the mention of the opening window was removed from the park's website due to lengthy construction progress. As of June 2026, the park is expected to open in 2027.

The Mattel website had a livestream camera to show the construction of the park.

A second park location in Bonner Springs, Kansas was originally planned for a 2026 opening. Its opening has since been set to no later than May 2031 under a development agreement with the City of Bonner Springs. Vertical construction is required to start by October 2027.

Four further Mattel Adventure parks are being developed, with a targeted overall completion by 2034.

In November 2026, the large billboard preventing the continued construction of Twin Mill Racer was taken down after VAI took full control of the Mattel theme park.

On 16 November 2026, during the week of IAAPA Expo in Orlando, VAI Resort announced the Mattel theme park in Glendale would be renamed Mattel City.

In November 2026 the Bonner Springs Planning Commission approved a 180-acre preliminary plat for Destination KCK, the development project that includes Mattel Adventure Park. The plan is scheduled for final approval before the Bonner Springs City Council in December 2026.

== Areas and attractions ==
The park will feature two Hot Wheels-themed roller coaster rides, called Bone Shaker and Twin Mill Racer. Bone Shaker will reach a maximum height of eighty-four feet. During the November 2026 IAAPA Expo in Orlando, three additional rollercoasters were announced for the park. The first new rollercoaster announced was the Monster High thrill rollercoaster, North America's first 360-degree free-spinning coaster. The next coaster is the Barbie surf ride. Themed around the Mattel Barbie dolls, this free-spinning rollercoaster will look like it is surfing giant waves back and forth. The third rollercoaster announced at the IAAPA Expo was a Masters of the Universe intense thrill coaster themed around Skeletor's legendary fortress. This rollercoaster will be the third Tilt Coaster in North America.

Other attractions include a 4D theater attraction and accompanying fully-themed beach house based on Barbie, a complex featuring several kiddie rides themed to Thomas & Friends, including a train ride aboard Thomas the Tank Engine, and a miniature golf course with props based on classic Mattel games like Uno and Pictionary. During the November 2026 IAAPA Expo in Orlando, four additional rides were announced. The first ride was Magic 8 Ball Remix, a family friendly spinning ride with energetic music. The second ride was the Masters of the Universe Drop Tower Experience, where riders rise up, tilt straight down, and plunge into a freefall towards the bottom of Castle Grayskull. The third ride was the Rock 'Em Sock 'Em Knockout Swing. The worlds tallest S&S Screamin' Swing will soar 132 feet and have a max speed of 68 MPH. The fourth ride was the Hot Wheels Monster Trucks: Immersive Dark Ride, joining Mega Wrex and Tiger Shark on an epic island adventure where you race through caverns and simulated environments.

All confirmed attractions (as of November 2026) are listed below.

=== Roller coasters ===
Ride	Year opened	IP
Hot Wheels Bone Shaker: The Ultimate Ride	TBA	Hot Wheels
Hot Wheels Twin Mill Racer	TBA	Hot Wheels
Barbie Surf Ride	TBA	Barbie
Masters of the Universe: Intense Thrill Coaster	TBA	Masters of the Universe
Monster High: Thrill Rollercoaster	TBA	Monster High

=== Other rides and attractions ===
Ride	Year opened	IP
He-Man vs. Skeletor Laser Tag	TBA	Masters of the Universe
Masters of the Universe Drop Tower Experience	TBA	Masters of the Universe
Barbie Beach House	TBA	Barbie
Barbie Flying Theatre	TBA	Barbie
The Barbie Rooftop	TBA	Barbie
Hot Wheels Unleashed 4D Ride	TBA	Hot Wheels
Hot Wheels Monster Trucks: Immersive Dark Ride	TBA	Hot Wheels
Hot Wheels Party Pit Stop	TBA	Hot Wheels
Hot Wheels Go-Karting: Raceway	TBA	Hot Wheels
Hot Wheels Speed Challenge	TBA	Hot Wheels
Hot Wheels Go-Karting: Junior Raceway	TBA	Hot Wheels
Thomas Adventure Train: Treasure Hunt	TBA	Thomas & Friends
Thomas & Friends: Party Station	TBA	Thomas & Friends
Bertie's Bus Stop	TBA	Thomas & Friends
Bulstrode's Stormy Voyage	TBA	Thomas & Friends
Flynn's Firefighting Academy	TBA	Thomas & Friends
Harold's Helicopter Tour	TBA	Thomas & Friends
Sodor Balloon Ride	TBA	Thomas & Friends
Dockside Play Park	TBA	Thomas & Friends
Uno! Wild Climb	TBA	Uno
Mattel Games Mini Golf	TBA	Mattel Games
KerPlunk Drop Tower	TBA	KerPlunk
Magic 8 Ball Remix	TBA	Magic 8 Ball
Rock 'Em Sock 'Em KNOCKOUT SWING	TBA	Rock 'Em Sock 'Em Robots

== Location ==
The Mattel City will be located just south of State Farm Stadium, home to the Arizona Cardinals, at the new VAI entertainment resort (formerly called Crystal Lagoons Island Resort), which will span sixty acres and cost $1 billion total. The concept for the theme park was developed in coordination with the resort's plan for expansion, whose opening will coincide with the opening of the park.

Mattel Adventure Park will be located just west of the Kansas Speedway as part of a 180-acre development called Destination KCK in the Kansas City area in Bonner Springs, Kansas.
