= Skydiver (ride) =

Carnival ride

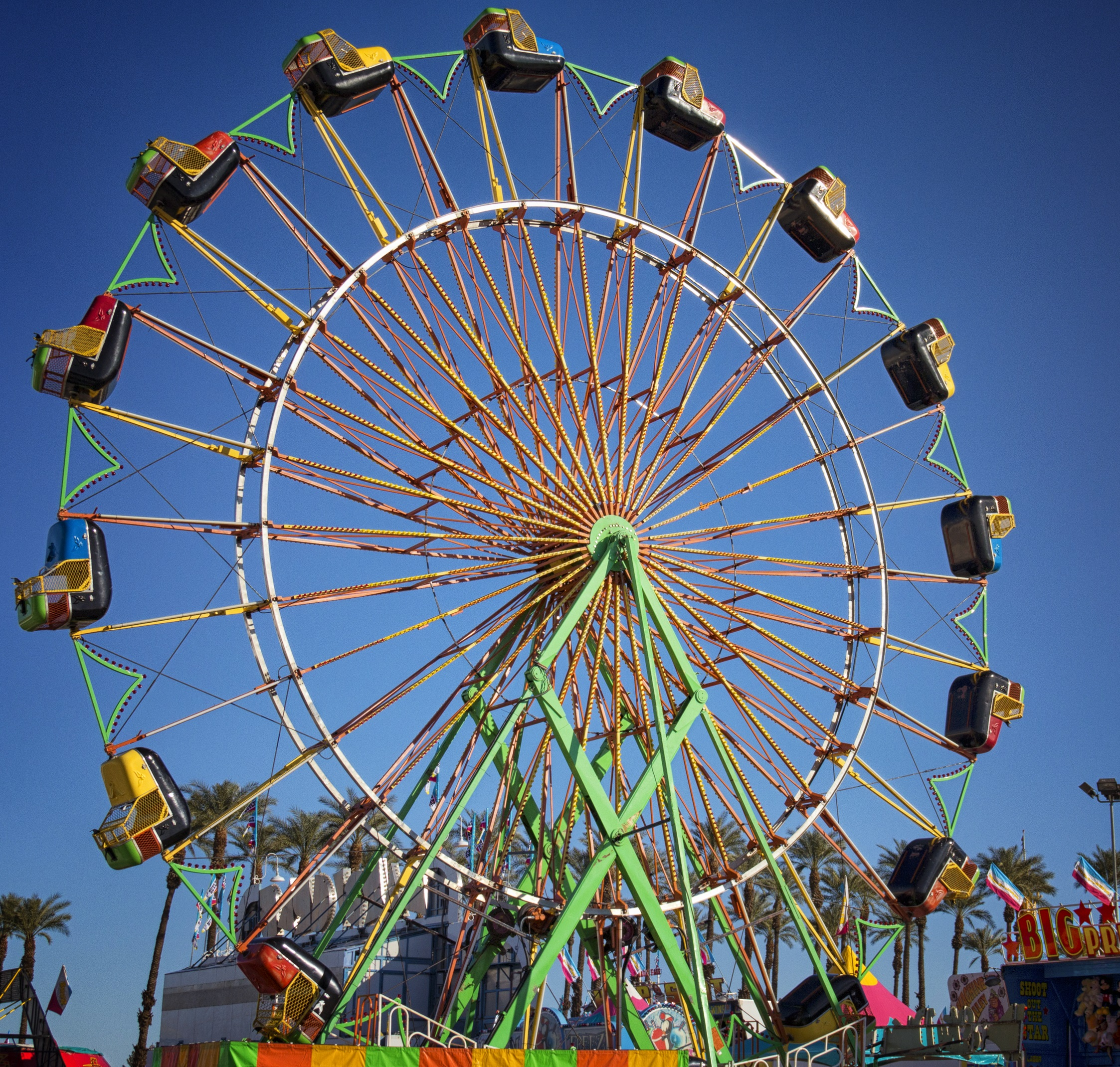
- A Skydiver in 2013 at the Riverside County Fair and National Date Festival, California
- Status: Discontinued
- Manufacturer: Chance Rides
- Vehicles: 16
- Riders per vehicle: 2

The Skydiver is an amusement ride produced from 1965 to 1987 by Chance Rides, an American manufacturer based in Wichita, Kansas.

Skydiver cars are mounted on a circular frame – like a Ferris wheel – that spin on a front-back axis similar to an aileron roll. As the ride required two trailers to transport, it was less popular than the Zipper, a similar but smaller ride also manufactured by Chance Rides.

== See also ==
Toboggan (roller coaster) – portable roller coaster model by Chance Rides
