= Chance Rides =

American amusement ride manufacturer

Chance Rides, LLC
- Type: Private
- Industry: Amusement ride manufacturing
- Founded: Chance Manufacturing: 1961; Chance Rides Manufacturing: 2002
- Headquarters: Wichita, Kansas, United States
- Key people: Harold Chance, Richard (Dick) Chance, Michael Chance, John Chance, Aaron Landrum
- Products: Roller coasters, thrill rides, family rides, gentle rides
- Subsidiaries: Chance Morgan
- Website: chancerides.com

Chance Rides is an American roller coaster and amusement ride manufacturer. Originally founded in 1961, the current company was formed on May 16, 2002, when the former Chance Industries Inc. emerged from bankruptcy. The main office and manufacturing facility are located in Wichita, Kansas.

== History ==
Chance Manufacturing was incorporated in 1961 by Richard H. (Harold) Chance. Harold Chance had been involved in the amusement business since 1946, building small trains for the Ottaway Amusement Company. He designed a 2 ft (610 mm) narrow gauge replica of the C. P. Huntington, a well-known steam locomotive built in 1863 for the Central Pacific Railroad. Titled by the same name, Chance's C. P. Huntington is the company's most successful product line. In 1967, Chance began producing Starliner Trams under the subsidiary Chance Coach. In 1970, Chance acquired the assets of the Allan Herschell Company. Richard G. Chance (Dick Chance) assumed control of the company and formed Chance Industries, Inc. in 1985 to oversee the various divisions – Chance Rides, Chance Coach, and Chance Operations. In December 1986, Chance then acquired Bradley & Kaye, a ride manufacturer specialized in children's rides and carousel figures.

=== Modern era ===
For several years, Chance Rides Manufacturing products were sold under the brand Chance Morgan. In 2011, the company reintroduced the Chance Rides brand which encompasses Chance Morgan Coasters, Inc. and Chance Rides Manufacturing. On September 17, 2011, trade publication Amusement Today presented Chance Rides with the Golden Ticket Award for Supplier of the Year, in honor of the company's 50th anniversary.

In 2023, Chance Rides was sold to Missouri-based private equity firm Permanent Equity.

== Products ==
=== Trains ===
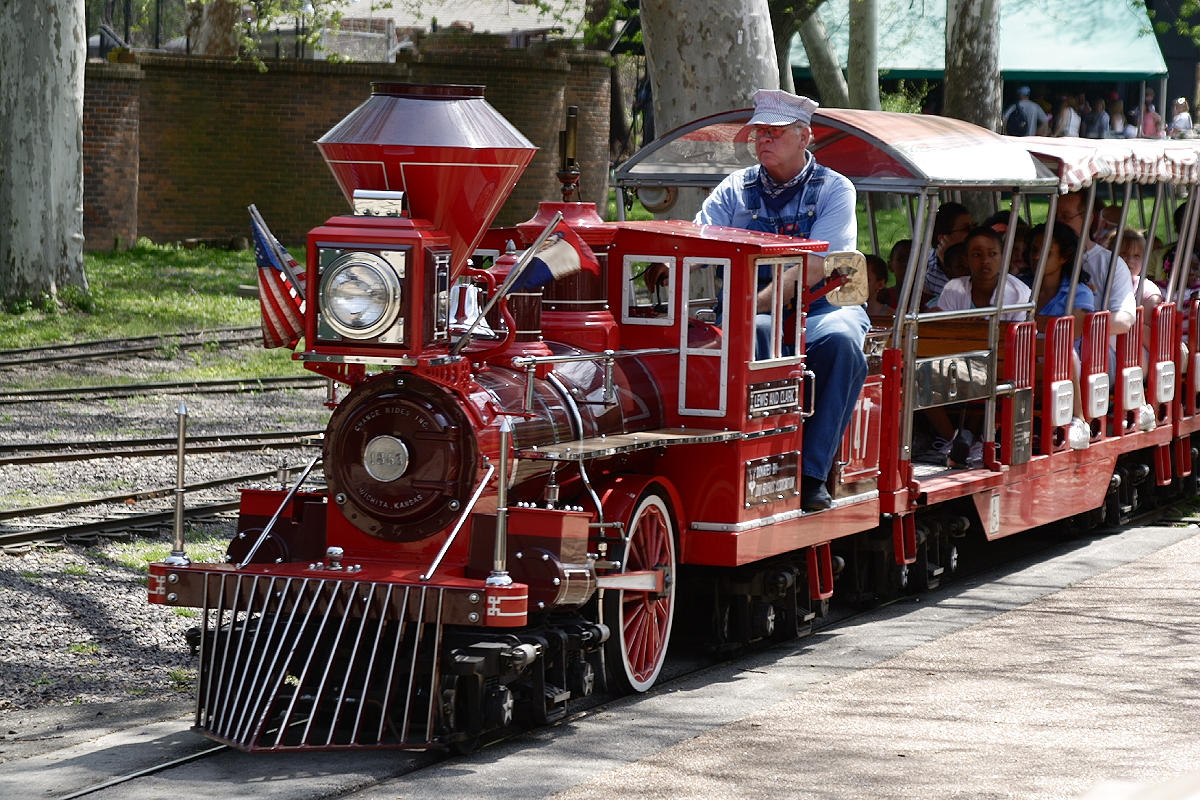
C.P. Huntington train at Saint Louis Zoo.

Chance Rides began to fabricate their 2 ft narrow gauge C. P. Huntington locomotive in 1961. These locomotives can be powered by gasoline, diesel, propane or electric motors; as of 2025, only the electric model is being offered. Its drive wheels are not powered, but roll on the rails while fake side rods reciprocate in and out of fake cylinders. Power is instead provided by the front and rear trucks.

With more than 400 examples built as of 2022, the C. P. Huntington has become the most popular park train since the Allan Herschell Company merged into Chance Industries in 1970 and production of the S-24 Iron Horse train ceased. Locomotives and coaches can be customized in a variety of ways.

=== Carousels ===
Chance Carrousels (deliberately spelled with two "R"s) were introduced in 1971 following the acquisition of the Allan Herschell Company the previous year. Chance modified the Herschell design giving it a more ornate style. After Chance purchased Bradley & Kaye in December 1986, Chance was able to use the molds and manufacturing rights to 62 carousel figures produced by Bradley & Kaye owner, David Bradley. He had carefully reproduced prized carousel animals from famous carvers over the previous 20 years and new molds were cast at the Chance facility under his direction, until Bradley died in 1988. These famous reproductions with spectacular detail have been included on Chance carrousels since the late 1980s. With the merger of the D. H. Morgan line of carousels, some of the unique Morgan figures have been added to the collection as well. All Chance Rides carousel figures are made from fiberglass. By 2013, Chance had produced over 300 carousels, making it the largest carousel manufacturer in the United States.

=== Ferris wheels ===
The first Ferris wheel from Chance, the Astro Wheel, was sold to showman Don Franklin and debuted at the 1967 Iowa State Fair. It featured 16 cars with two passengers per car. The first park model, an 80-foot Giant Wheel, was built in 1975 at Valleyfair amusement park in Minnesota. It features 18 cars holding four passengers per car and is still in operation. The Giant Wheel/Century Wheel was introduced in various sizes in both park and portable models in 1988.

In 2006, Chance worked with Ronald Bussink Professional Rides of Switzerland and Dutch Wheels BV, a division of Vekoma Rides, to produce larger wheels such as the Niagara SkyWheel which stands 53.3 m (175 ft) tall. It features 42 air-conditioned cars seating eight passengers per car. According to Chance Rides director Angus Jenkins, the larger wheels are known as observation wheels as opposed to Ferris wheels, since they carry riders in enclosed cars rather than in open seats.

On October 19, 2012, Chance Rides announced a long term license agreement with Bussink Design GmbH for the exclusive rights to manufacture and sell the R80XL Giant Wheel in North America. Chance Rides will market the R80XL, which is over 250 ft (76 m) tall, under an affiliate company, Chance American Wheels. The first R80XL wheel was manufactured by Maurer German Wheels in Munich, Germany, and was delivered to the city early in 2013. The first U.S. version built by Chance was the Capital Wheel at the National Harbor, Md. It opened May 23, 2014. Chance Rides/Chance American Wheels will continue to manufacturer and sell R60 wheels in North America under an exclusive license from Dutch Wheels BV.

Notable wheels include:

- The Great Escape Giant Wheel (1989)
- I-X Center Ferris wheel (1992) 125-foot (38 m) tall. It was the world's tallest indoor wheel when it opened. Relocated in 2023 to Canton Football Hall of Fame Village.
- Hersheypark Ferris wheel (1996)
- Clementon Amusement Park Giant Ferris Wheel (1997)
- Niagara SkyWheel (2006)
- Myrtle Beach SkyWheel (2011)
- Seattle Great Wheel (2012)
- Capital Wheel (2014)

=== Roller coasters ===
Chance Manufacturing's first coaster was the Toboggan, a portable ride in which a small vehicle climbed vertically up a tower then spiraled back down around the same tower. The ride was invented by Walter House of Amarillo, Texas, and Chance acquired the manufacturing rights and started producing it in 1969. It was designed to be a carnival ride, fitting on two trailers, but several units were purchased by amusement parks where they were set up as permanent attractions. Chance manufactured 32 of these units, two of which still operate at a permanent park. In 1998 Chance introduced the Big Dipper children's coaster. With the integration of the D. H. Morgan line into Chance Rides in 2001, the company acquired track manufacturing technology and the ability to offer a variety of coaster designs. D. H. Morgan was an offshoot of Arrow Development, original developer of tubular steel track, first used on Disney's Matterhorn Bobsleds attraction. In 2006, Chance formed an alliance with Vekoma. Chance Rides represented Vekoma in North America and manufactured the steel track for select projects. On October 17, 2012 Chance Rides and Vekoma discontinued their agreement to produce rides together for the North American market.

==== List of roller coasters ====
As of 2023, Chance Rides has built 44 roller coasters around the world.

Name	Model	Park	Country	Opened	Status	Ref
Toboggan	Toboggan	Trimper's Rides	United States	Unknown	Removed	
Toboggan	Toboggan	Adventureland	United States	Unknown	Removed	
Toboggan	Toboggan	Jenkinson's Boardwalk	United States	Unknown	Removed	
Toboggan	Toboggan	Great Adventure Amusement Park	United States	Unknown	Removed	
Star Wars	Toboggan	Parc Avenue	France	Unknown	Removed	
Toboggan	Toboggan	Playland Park	United States	Unknown	Removed	
Toboggan	Toboggan	Old Chicago	United States	Unknown	Removed	
Swiss Toboggan	Toboggan	Boblo Island	Canada	Unknown	Removed	
Toboggan	Toboggan	Shaheen's Fun-O-Rama Park	United States	Unknown	Removed	
Toboggan	Toboggan	Central Pier Arcade & Speedway	United States	Unknown	Removed	
Toboggan	Toboggan	Funtown Pier	United States	Unknown	Removed	
Toboggan	Toboggan	Family Kingdom Amusement Park	United States	Unknown	Removed	
Toboggan	Toboggan	Sportland Pier	United States	1966	Removed	
Swamp Buggy	Toboggan	Six Flags AstroWorld	United States	1970	Removed	
Toboggan	Toboggan	Parc Belmont	Canada	1970	Removed	
Toboggan	Toboggan	Casino Pier	United States	1970	Removed	
Toboggan	Toboggan	Queens Park	United States	1970	Removed	
Swiss Toboggan	Toboggan	Santa's Village AZoosment Park	United States	1971	Removed	
Toboggan	Toboggan	Hersheypark	United States	1972	Removed	&
Arctic Cat	Toboggan	Crystal Beach Park	Canada	1974	Removed	
Unknown	Toboggan	Cal Expo Amusement Park	United States	1975	Removed	
Swiss Toboggan	Toboggan	In The Game Funtrackers	United States	1978	Removed	
Toboggan	Toboggan	Stewart Beach Park	United States	1980	Removed	
Toboggan	Toboggan	Ghost Town Village	United States	1980	Removed	
Toboggan	Toboggan	Lakemont Park	United States	1991	Removed	
Wild & Wooly Toboggan; Formerly Toboggan; Formerly Earthquake McGoon's Brain Rattler	Toboggan	Little Amerricka; Seven Peaks Water Park Duneland; Dogpatch USA	United States	1993; 1989 to 1990; 1969 to 1988	Operating	
Joust	Big Dipper	Dutch Wonderland	United States	1998	Operating	
Woodstock Express; Formerly Big Dipper	Big Dipper	Michigan's Adventure	United States	1999	Operating	
Gold Rush	Big Dipper	Wild Adventures	United States	1999	Removed	
Toboggan	Toboggan	Grand Prix Amusements; Arnolds Park	Canada	1999; 1998	Removed	
Wile E. Coyote's Grand Canyon Blaster	Big Dipper	Six Flags Over Texas	United States	2001	Operating	
Toboggan	Toboggan	Conneaut Lake Park	United States	2002	Removed	
The Joker Funhouse Coaster; Formerly Wile E. Coyote Canyon Blaster	Big Dipper Custom	Six Flags Over Georgia	United States	2004	Operating	
Toboggan	Toboggan	Clacton Pier; Great Yarmouth Pleasure Beach	United Kingdom	2009; 1993 to 2000	Removed	
Lightning Run	Hyper GT-X Coaster	Kentucky Kingdom	United States	2014	Operating	
Toboggan	Toboggan	Parque de Diversiones Anita Nueva Aventura	Mexico	2015	Operating	
Family Roller Coaster	Big Dipper Custom	Wildlife World Zoo	United States	2016	Operating	
Nickelodeon Slime Streak	Big Dipper Custom	Nickelodeon Universe Theme Park inside the American Dream Meadowlands	United States	2019	Operating	
Toboggan	Toboggan	Parque de la Huaycha	Peru	2022	Operating	
Space Moon; Toboggan	Toboggan	Animalia; Adventureland	Brazil; United States	2023; 1973 to 1979	Operating	
Hot Wheels Boneshaker: The Ultimate Ride	Family	Mattel Adventure Park (Arizona)	United States		Delayed	
Hot Wheels Twin Mill Racer	Hyper GT-X Looping Coaster	Mattel Adventure Park (Arizona)	United States		Delayed	
Hot Wheels Boneshaker: The Ultimate Ride	Family	Mattel Adventure Park (Kansas)	United States		Delayed	
Hot Wheels Twin Mill Racer	Hyper GT-X Looping Coaster	Mattel Adventure Park (Kansas)	United States		Delayed	

== Current models ==
- 20 ft (6.10 m) Carrousel
- 28 ft (8.53 m) Carrousel
- 28 ft (8.53 m) Double Decker Carrousel
- 36 ft (10.97 m) Carrousel
- 36 ft (10.97 m) Double Decker Carrousel
- 50 ft (15.24 m) Grand Carrousel
- Aviator
- Century Wheel
- DGW35 Gondola Wheel
- DGW45 Gondola Wheel
- Electric Cars
- Electric, Diesel, or Gas C.P. Huntington replica 2 ft (610 mm) narrow gauge miniature train
- Family Coaster
- Freestyle
- Giant Wheel
- Hypercoasters 150 to 300 feet (45.72 to 91.44 m) Mamba, World's of Fun
- Hyper GT-X Coaster Lightning Run, Kentucky Kingdom
- Pharaoh's Fury
- GXL200* 200 ft (60.96 m) Observation Wheel
- R60 Giant Wheel
- R80XL Giant Wheel
- Revolution 20
- Revolution 32
- Tramstar HD
- Tramstar LFT
- UniCoaster
- Unicoaster 2.0
- Wipeout
- Yo Yo
- Zipper

== Past models ==
- Alpine Bobs (also available in Rock and Roll/Swingin' Safari/Thunder Bolt themes)
- Astro Wheel
- Casino (variation of the Trabant)
- Chaos
- Falling Star
- Flying Bobs (originally by Herschell)/Thunderbolt (rethemed Bobs)
- Inverter
- Music Fest (variation of the Flying Bobs)
- Observation Tower
- Olympia Bobs (originally by Herschell)
- Pump-It Handcar
- Radar
- Rok-N-Rol (originally by Herschell)
- Rotor
- Sea Dragon (predecessor to the Pharaoh's Fury)
- Sidewheeler
- Skydiver
- Sky Wheel (originally by Herschell)
- Slingshot
- Space Shuttle
- Star Fighter
- Suspended Family Coaster
- Toboggan
- Trabant
- Tumbler (a lifting, double-wheel version of the Skydiver- was known as Wheel Barrow. Only one built)
- Turbo
- Twister
- Wagon Wheel (variation of the Trabant)
- Wagon Wheeler
- The Zipper
- Zumur
