= Launched Loop (Arrow Dynamics) =

Steel roller coaster

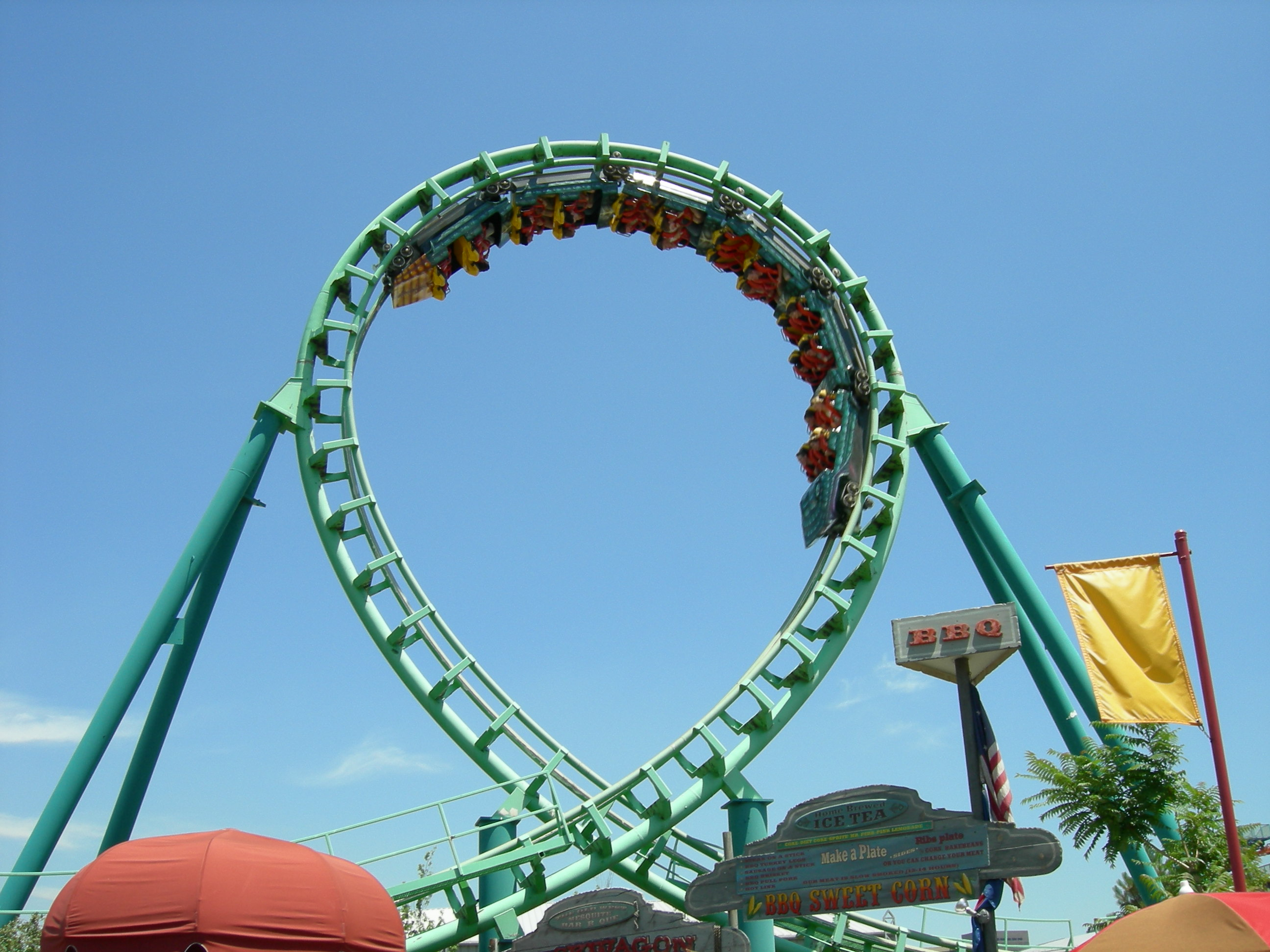
- Sidewinder at Elitch Gardens in 2006.
- Status: Discontinued
- First manufactured: 1977
- No. of installations: 8
- Manufacturer: Arrow Dynamics
- Height: 56.0 ft (17.1 m)
- Drop: 47 ft (14 m)
- Length: 635.0 ft (193.5 m)
- Speed: 45.0 mph (72.4 km/h)
- G force: 4.0
- Vehicle type: Roller coaster train
- Vehicles: 1
- Riders per vehicle: 4
- Rows: 2
- Riders per row: 2
- Duration: 1:06
- Inversions: 1
- Launched Loop at RCDB

A Launched Loop is a type of steel launched shuttle roller coaster manufactured by Arrow Dynamics. With 8 different installations, 7 of them being relocated at least once, the ride was introduced in 1977, with the last one opening in 1993.

== History ==
The first installation of a Launched Loop dates back to 1977 with the installation of Demon at Kings Island in Mason, Ohio. Two more also opened in 1977; Zoomerang at Boardwalk and Baseball in Haines City, Florida, and Black Widow at Six Flags New England in Agawam, Massachusetts. These were most likely built to rival Schwarzkopf's Shuttle Loop, which started being built the same year. In 1987, Demon at Kings Island became the first Launched Loop to be relocated, becoming Thunderbolt Express at Camden Park in Huntington, West Virginia. As of September 2019, only three Launched Loops operate: Revolution at Blackpool Pleasure Beach in Lancashire, England, Sidewinder at Elitch Gardens in Denver, Colorado, and Diamond Back at Frontier City in Oklahoma City, Oklahoma.

== Notable installations ==
- Lightnin' Loops was a combination of two different launched loop roller coasters with interlocking loops built for Six Flags Great Adventure in 1978. One track closed in 1987 and stood nonoperational until 1992 when the other track closed. The track that closed in 1987 was then relocated to Frontier City as Diamond Back as the other track was relocated to Six Flags America as Python, both opening in 1993.
- Demon at Kings Island, while not being the first built, was the first launched loop to open. The ride was then relocated to Camden Park as Thunderbolt Express where it operated until 1999.
- Revolution at Blackpool Pleasure Beach is the longest-operating launched loop, opening in 1979, and also is the only of its kind to not be relocated any time in its lifetime.

== Installations ==
| Name | Park | Opened | Closed | Status | Cite(s) |
|---|---|---|---|---|---|
| Afterburner Zoomerang | Fun Spot Park Boardwalk and Baseball | 1991 1977 | 2008 1990 | Closed Relocated | |
| Black Widow | Six Flags New England | 1977 | 1999 | Closed | |
| Boomerang | Tokyo Dome City | 1980 | 1984 | Closed | |
| Diamond Back Lightnin' Loops | Frontier City Six Flags Great Adventure | 1993 1978 | Operating 1986 | Operating Relocated | |
| Python Lightnin' Loops | Six Flags America Six Flags Great Adventure | 1993 1978 | 1998 1992 | Closed Relocated | |
| Revolution | Blackpool Pleasure Beach | 1979 | Operating | Operating | |
| Sidewinder Roaring Tornado | Elitch Gardens Magic Springs Theme and Water Park | 1990 1980 | Operating 1989 | Operating Relocated | |
| Thunderbolt Express Demon | Camden Park Kings Island | 1988 1977 | 1999 1987 | Closed Relocated | |
