= Revolution (Blackpool Pleasure Beach) =

Steel roller coaster at Pleasure Beach Resort

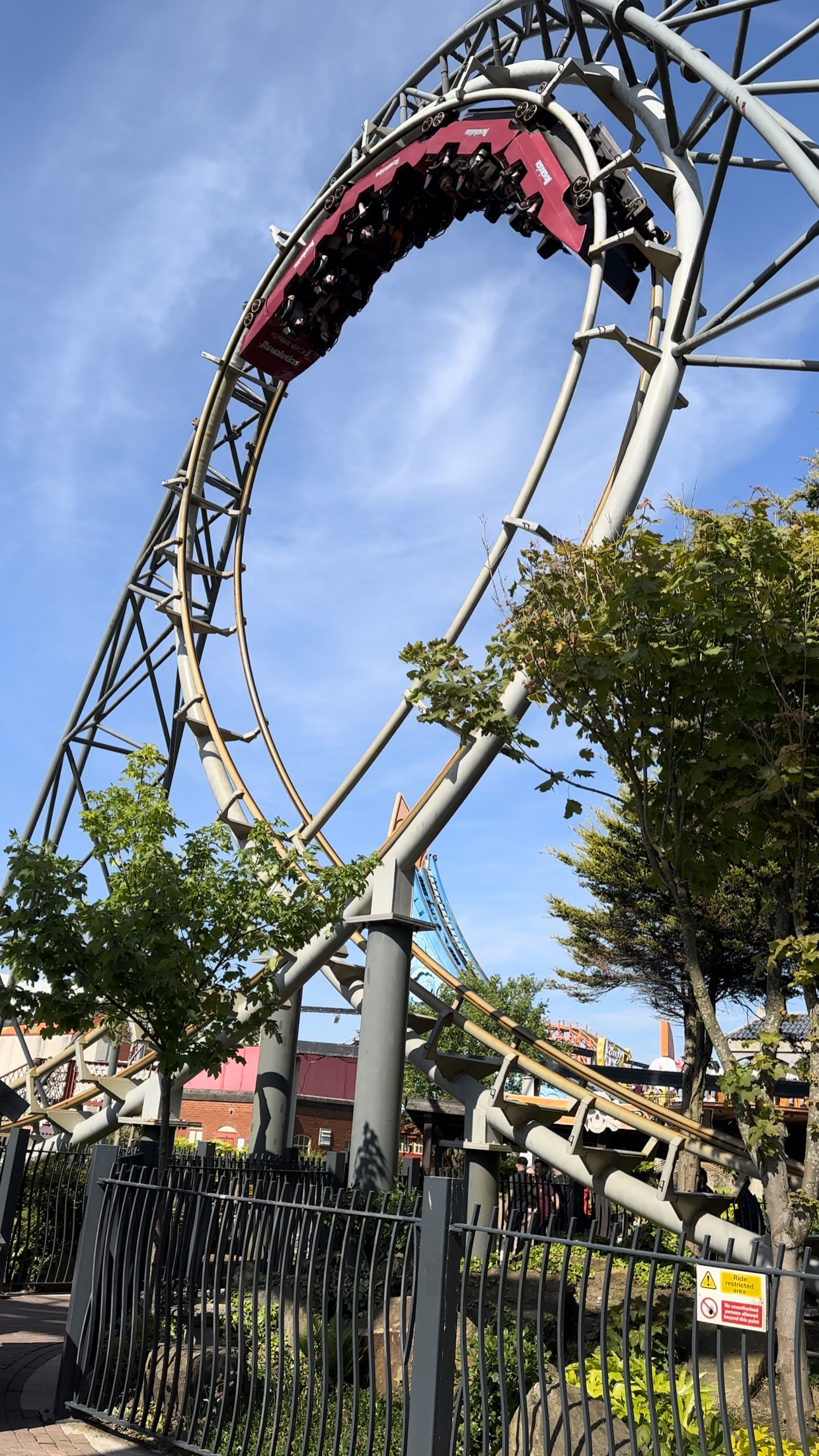
- Revolution's loop

Pleasure Beach Resort
- Location: Pleasure Beach Resort
- Coordinates: 53°47′24″N 3°03′19″W
- Status: Operating
- Opening date: 1979
- Cost: £1,000,000

General statistics
- Type: Steel – Shuttle – Launched
- Manufacturer: Arrow Development
- Model: Launched Loop
- Lift/launch system: Electric Winch Launch
- Height: 56 ft (17 m)
- Drop: 47 ft (14 m)
- Length: 635 ft (194 m)
- Speed: 45 mph (72 km/h)
- Inversions: 1 (traversed twice)
- Duration: 1:06
- Max vertical angle: 52°
- G-force: 4
- Height restriction: 50 in (127 cm)
- Trains: Single train with 4 cars; riders arranged 2 across in 2 rows for a total of 16 riders per train
- Revolution at RCDB

Revolution (formerly Irn-Bru Revolution) is a launched shuttle roller coaster at Pleasure Beach Resort (better known as Blackpool Pleasure Beach) in Blackpool, England. It was built by Arrow Development in 1979, and was the first European roller coaster to feature an inversion. Until the introduction of Infusion in 2007, it was the park's only inverting roller coaster.

It is one of only three Arrow Development shuttle coasters still in operation, the others being Diamond Back at Frontier City in Oklahoma and Sidewinder at Elitch Gardens Theme Park in Colorado.

== History ==
Revolution was designed by Arrow Development, with steel fabrication by Watson Steel. It cost £1,000,000, and is a Launched Loop coaster. It opened in 1979 as the first inverting roller coaster in Europe. It was initially painted red and white, with the Union Kingdom flag painted on the front and back.

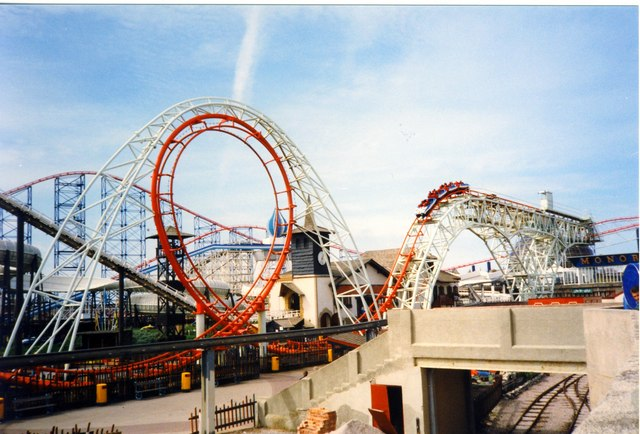
Revolution in its original colour scheme

In the 1990s, the ride was sponsored by Irn-Bru, and was known as Irn-Bru Revolution. It featured the Irn-Bru orange and blue colours during this time. The sponsorship ended in 2011, at which point the ride reverted to its original name.

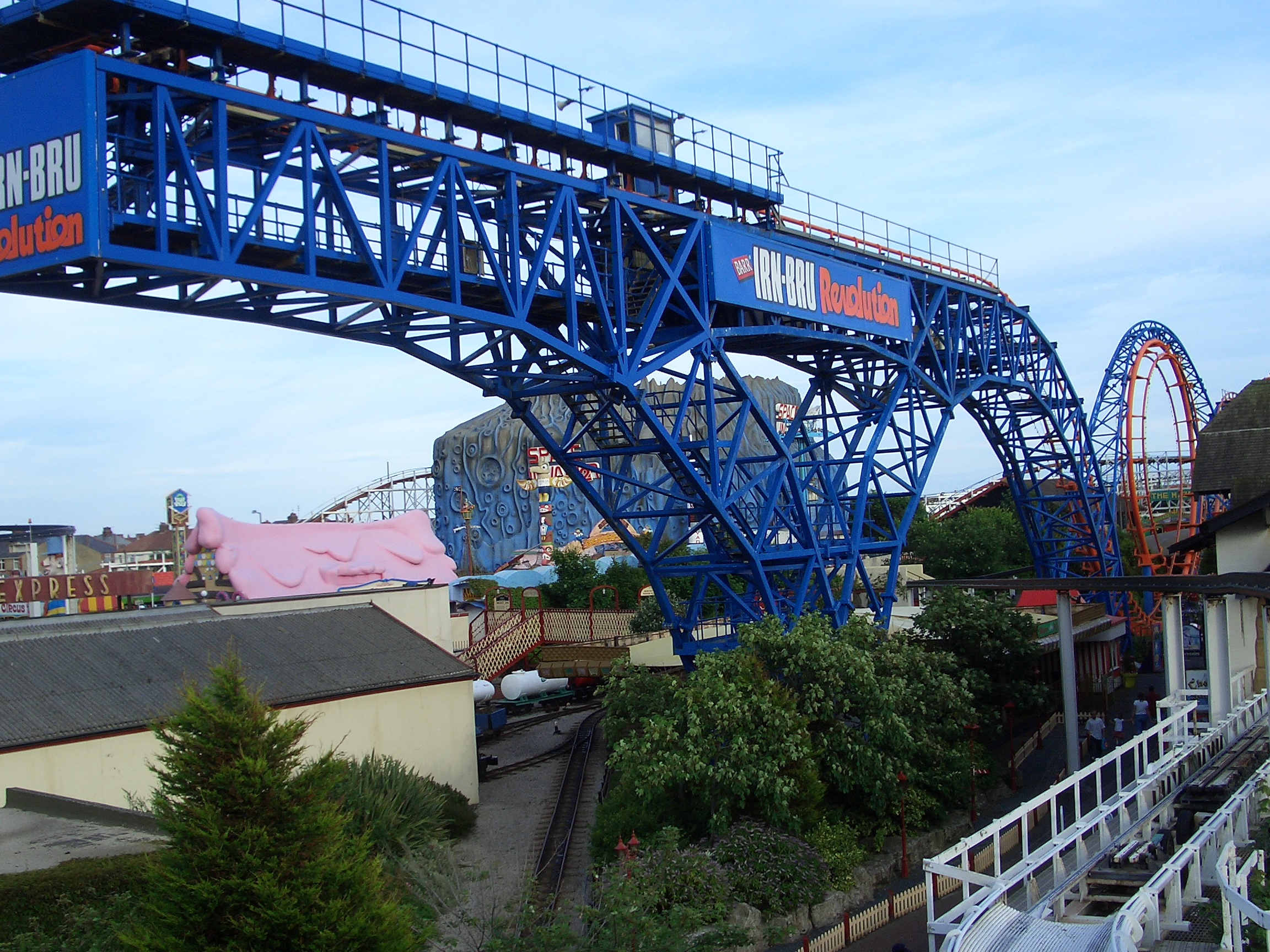
Revolution in its Irn-Bru colour scheme

In February 2012, the park confirmed that the ride would be closed for early parts of the season in order to be painted in a new colour scheme: grey and white. It received additional repainting for the 2017 season as well.

== Ride experience ==
The ride consists of two raised sections of track with a vertical loop in the centre. The train is launched from the first raised platform into the loop and up the second platform, where it repeats the process in reverse.

The ride is 17 metres (56 ft) tall, and features a drop of 14 metres (47 ft). It has top speeds of 72 km/h (45 mph), and is 194 metres (635 ft) long. It has a maximum vertical angle of 52 degrees, and subjects riders to 4 Gs.

The ride has a single train with four cars. Each car has two rows that seat two riders, for a total of 16 riders per train.

== In popular culture ==
- The ride was featured on the BBC show Jim'll Fix It when a group of Cub Scouts ate their lunch whilst riding the roller coaster.
- The ride was featured in a 2007 commercial for Irn-Bru soft drinks when a group of goths drank Irn-Bru whilst riding the coaster, resulting in them being completely drenched by the drinks.
