= Camden Park Mound =

Adena burial mound in West Virginia, US

- Location within West Virginia Location within the United States
- 38°23′51″N 82°31′50″W
- Type: Burial mound
- Location: Huntington, West Virginia, U.S.

History
- Built by: Adena Native American's

Site notes
- Public access: Camden Park

The Camden Park Mound, is an Adena Native American burial mound located in the center of Camden Park, in Huntington, West Virginia. A second mound once sat just east of the park, but was later demolished during the construction of the Ohio-and-Big Sandy Railroad. The mound being the third largest in West Virginia, was believed to have been built between around 1000 B.C. and A.D. 1 by Mound builders. Several other mounds were set throughout Huntington and its tri-state area, others were leveled by the creation of main roads throughout the city.

The mound is the center of the park warping its original design, resulting in local Huntingtonians believing it to have cursed the park.

== See also ==
- Adena culture
- Mound builders
- Prehistory of West Virginia
