= Ohio Valley Electric Railway =

Railway in West Virginia and Kentucky

- Ohio Valley Electric Railway car #103

Overview
- Headquarters: Huntington, West Virginia, U.S.
- Locale: Huntington, West Virginia, Ashland, Kentucky, and Ironton, Ohio
- Dates of operation: 1900–1937

Technical
- Track gauge: 4 ft 8 1/2 in (1,435 mm) standard gauge
- Electrification: Overhead lines
- Track length: 32 miles (51 km)

The Ohio Valley Electric Railway was a street railway and interurban system that ran between Huntington, West Virginia, and Ashland, Kentucky. The system was also connected by ferry to Ironton, Ohio.

== History ==
The Ohio Valley Electric Railway was incorporated in West Virginia on August 28, 1899, and, backed by Senator Johnson N. Camden, bought out the Consolidated Light and Railway Company of Huntington, the Ashland and Catlettsburg Street Railway, and the Ironton and Petersburg Street Railway. Operations began in 1900, new track connected the West Virginia and Kentucky segments of the line, and the combined properties became known as the Camden Interstate Railway Company. The railway established Camden Park in 1903.

In 1908, the company changed its name back to the Ohio Valley Electric Railway. Street railway operations ceased in 1937.
