= Bayern Kurve =

Roller coaster-like amusement ride

The Bayern Kurve is a roller coaster-like amusement ride that moves a train around a banked circular track, gaining speed as the ride progresses. It is made in both a portable and park model and originally debuted in 1965. It was invented by German engineer Anton Schwarzkopf.

During the ride, riders sit in one of the sixteen bobsled-themed cars that travel at a high speed around a circular single-hilled track. Riders start in an upright position and as the cars pick up speed, they tilt inward toward the center of the ride. This ride is also known for its loud horn which is similar to that of a diesel train engine that blasts its loud roar when the ride reaches maximum speed. Also akin to a train, the seamed track creates the same rail "click-clack" railway sound, particularly at the lower section of track in the front. Additionally, the ride has a distinct whine that increases with speed due to its tire/blade drive.

While the ride was originally manufactured by Schwarzkopf, a similar version known as the Olympic Bobs was also manufactured by Chance Rides.

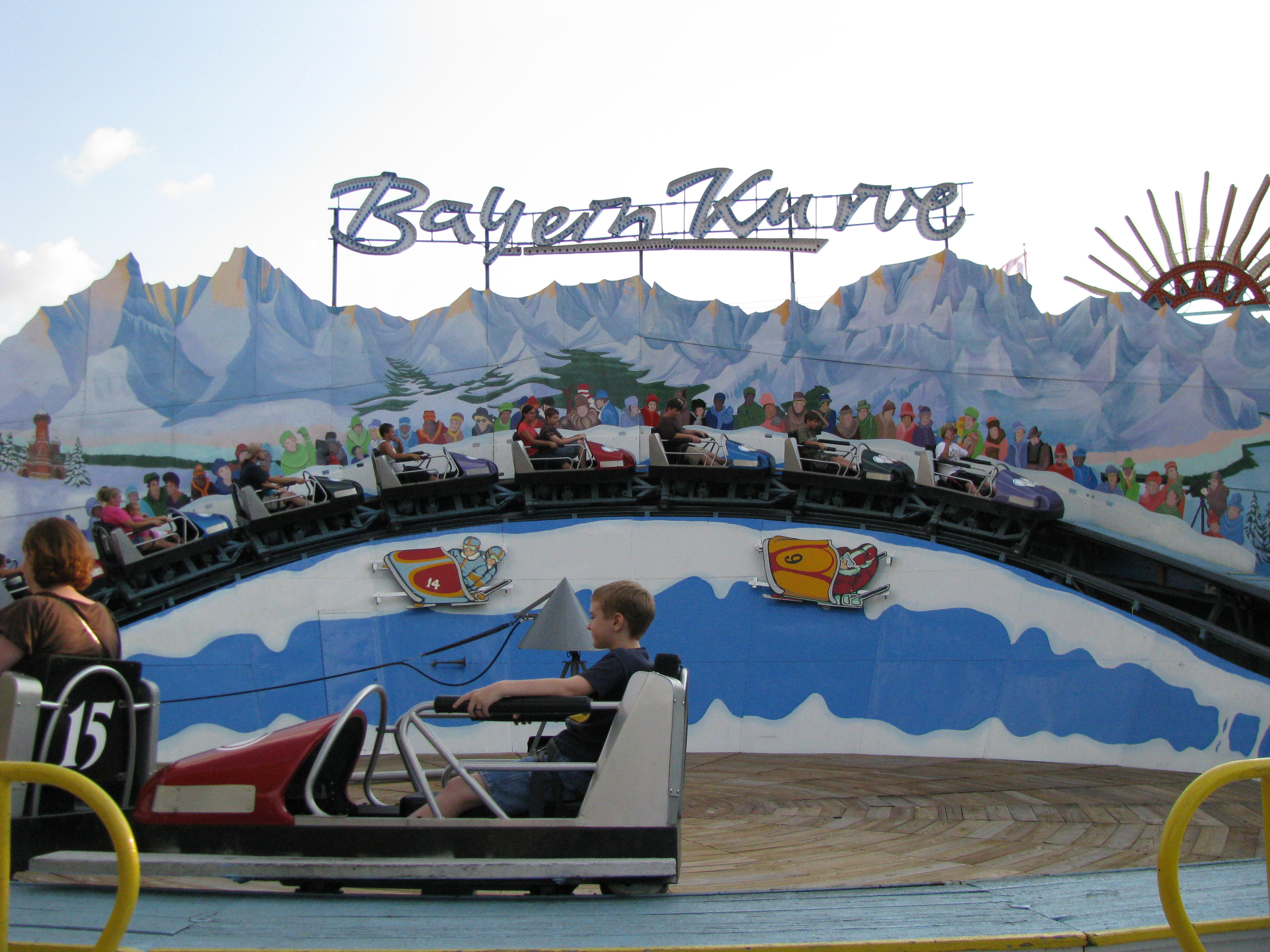
In front of Kennywood's ride during the day

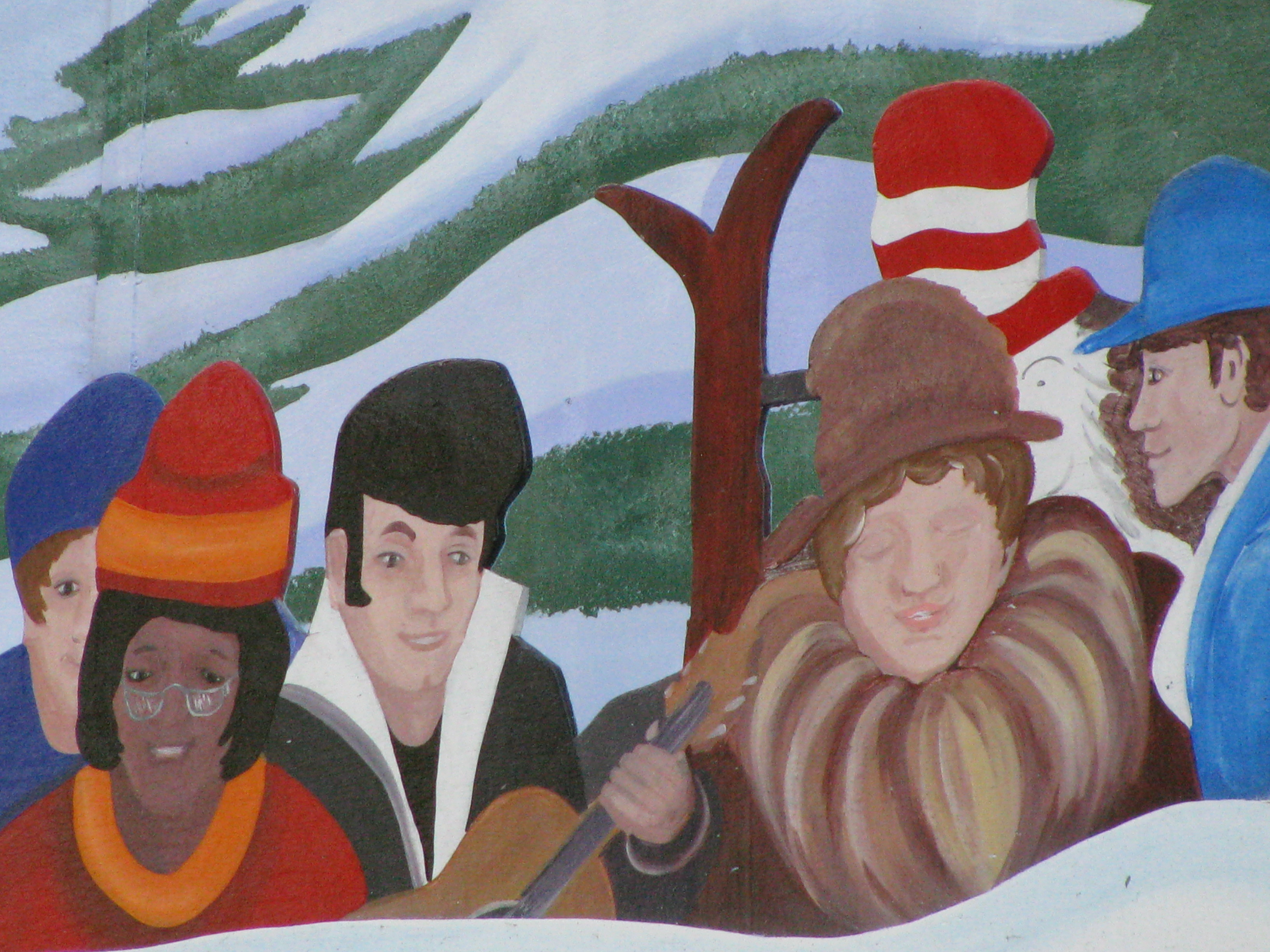
Kennywoods Cat in the Hat and Elvis characters on the backdrop

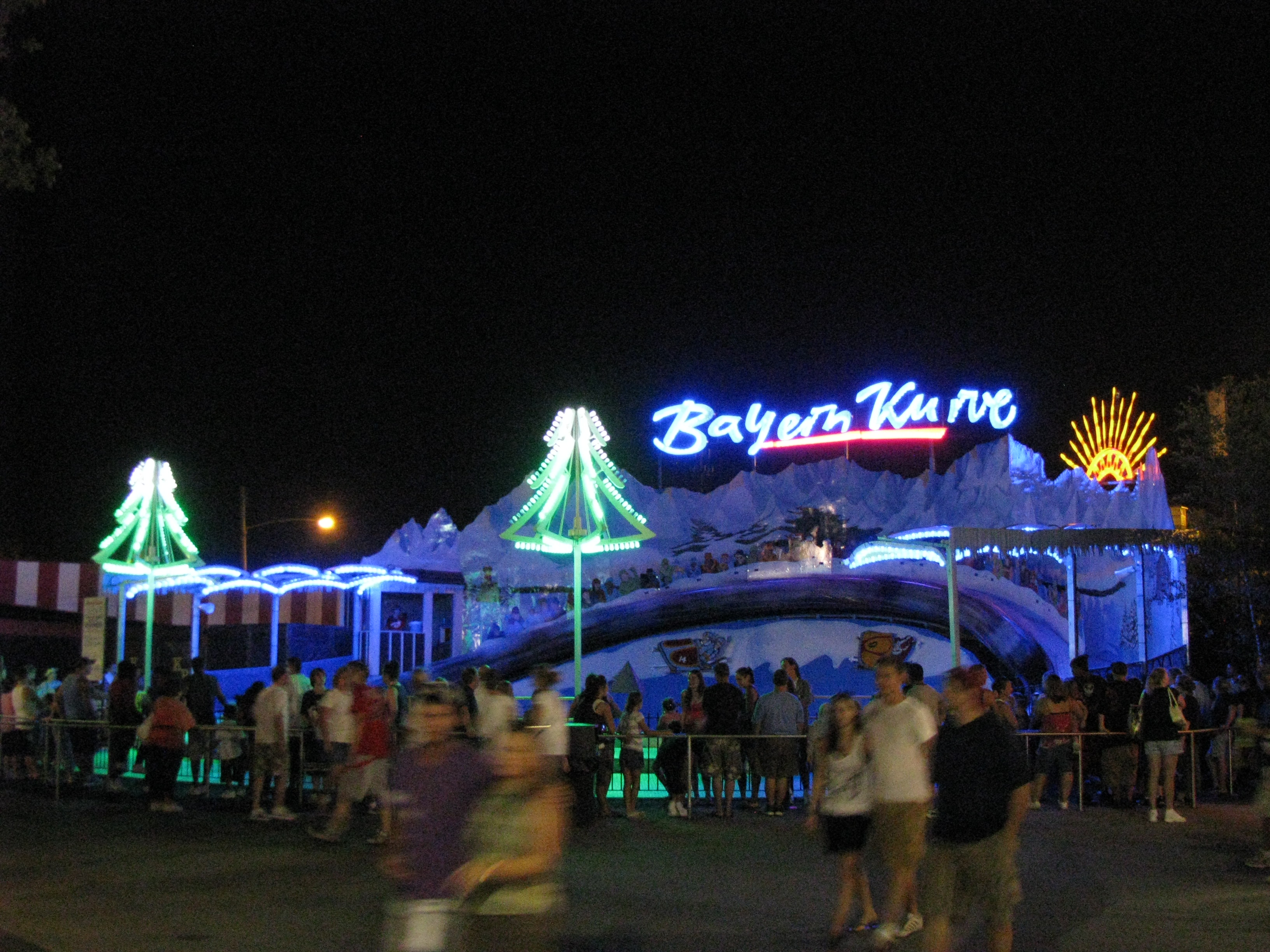
Overview of Kennywood's ride at night

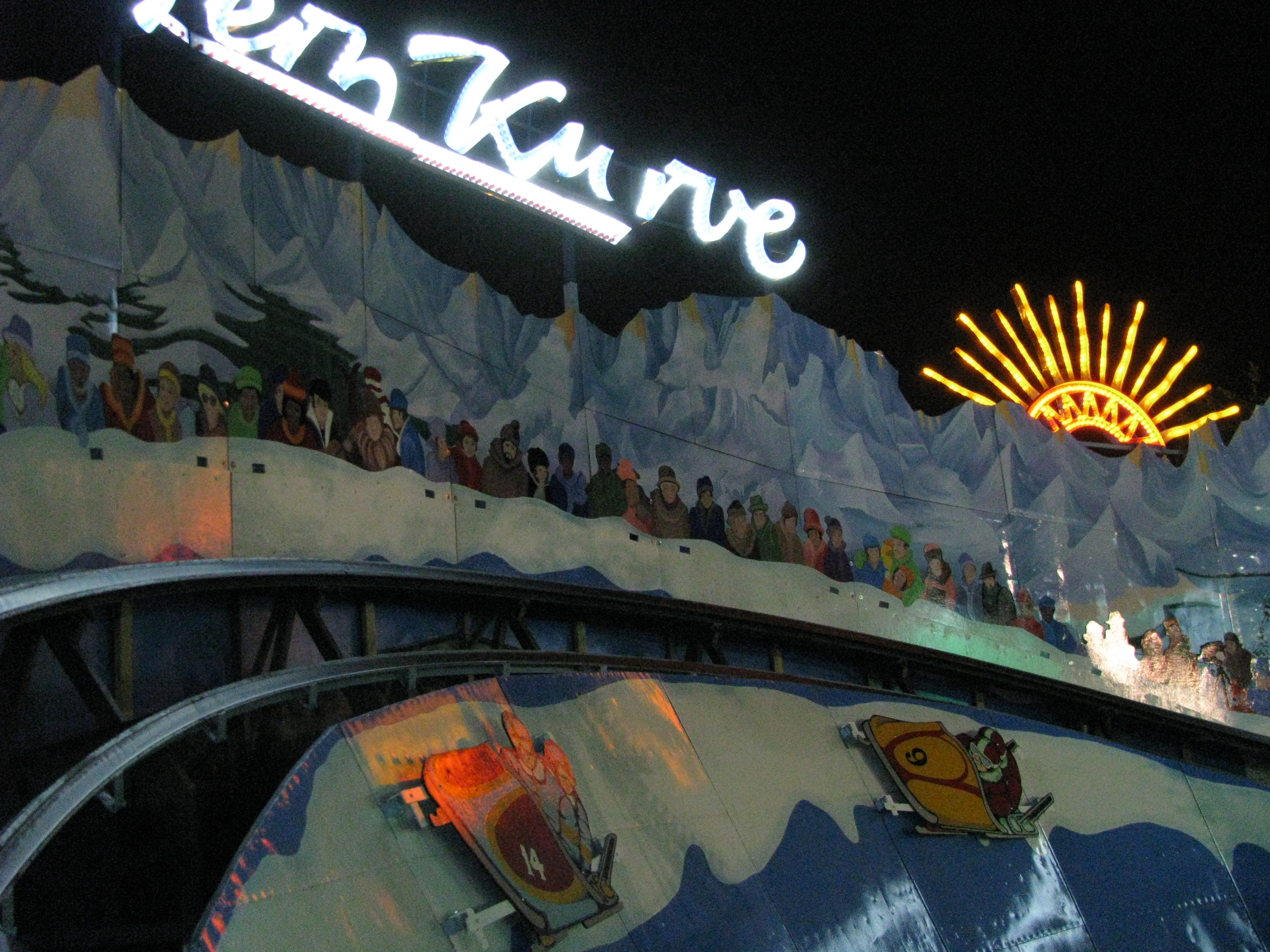
On ride at Kennywood at night

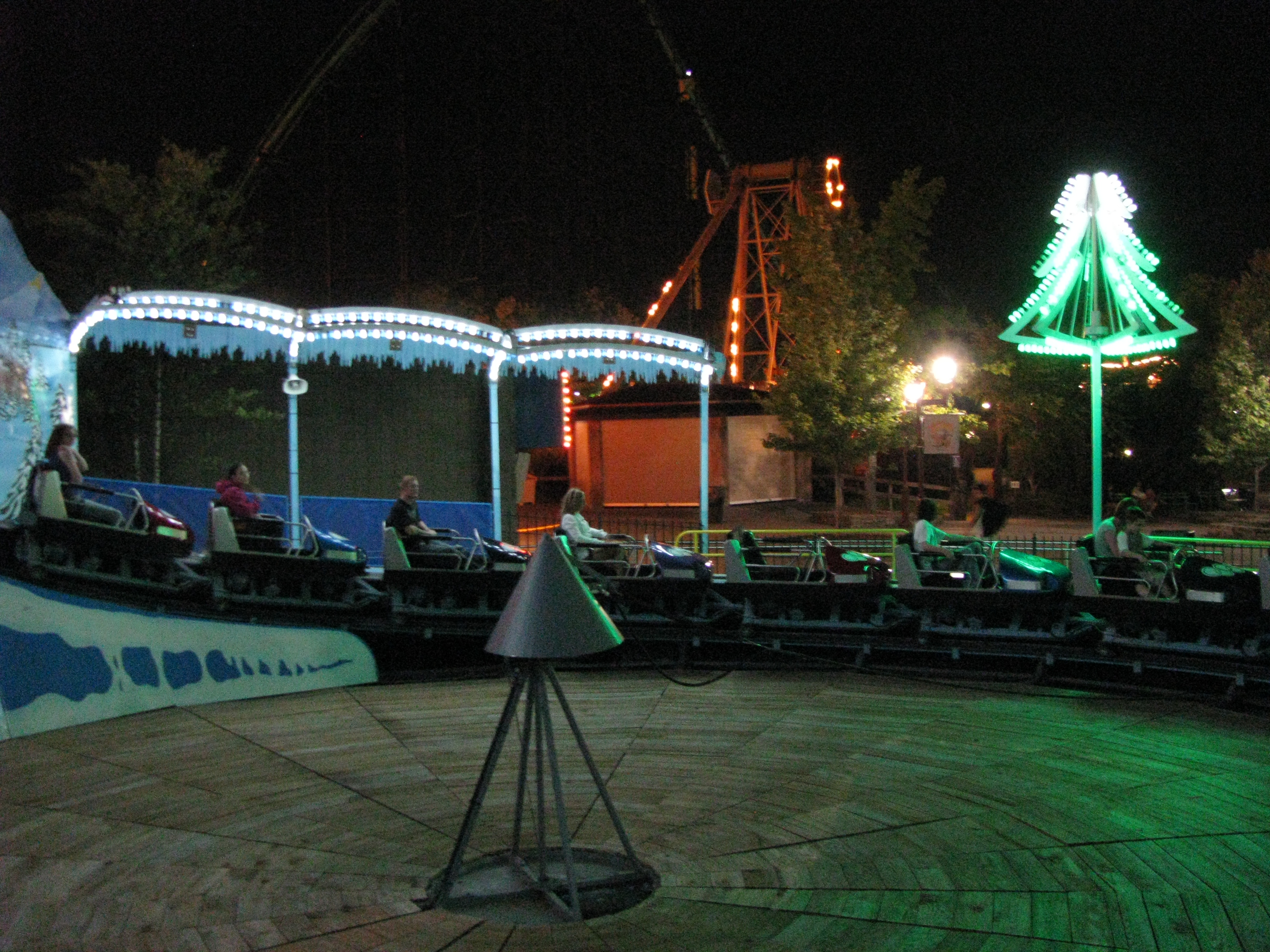
On ride at Kennywood looking across

== Specifications ==
- There are 16 cars capable of holding 2 passengers each, making the maximum capacity 32 riders.
- Theoretically this ride can thrill a maximum of 900 riders per hour.
- The entire ride weighs approximately 29 tons.
- The outer diameter of the ride is approximately 21 meters.
- The portable version of this ride is transported by 3 trailers.
- The absolute top speed is claimed to be approximately 75 mph (120 km/h), but it is typically run at about 25 mph (40 km/h) in most parks.

== Appearance ==
Although Bayern Kurves have been known to be re-themed on occasion, they are famous for their original Olympic bobsled appearance. The ride has a backdrop painted to look like mountain scenery with spectators looking down at the track. Originally there was a strip of lights running beneath the spectators. There is a lighted sign that reads "Bayern Kurve" and flashing sun mounted above the mountains and sometimes there are chasing lights added to edge the tops of the mountains. There are lighted Olympic rings mounted on the mountains below the track with a wooden bobsled figure on each side of the rings. The sixteen cars were each built with headlights and in some cases, the front of each car had the flag of a different nation painted on the front. The loading platform is surrounded by a railing with the Olympic rings in it and has a lighted, scalloped awning above it in parts. Also, there are lighted trees on poles in the loading platform. As mentioned above, this ride has been re-themed on numerous occasions and certain features are occasionally added or removed.

== Installations ==
The following is a partial list of Bayern Kurve installations.

| Name | Park | Opened | Closed | Notes |
|---|---|---|---|---|
| Bayern Kurve | Knoebels Amusement Resort | TBD | Under construction | Being constructed from two separate rides. One was previously a Bayern Kurve at Fun Spot with the other being a Swiss-Bob from Amusements of America. Ride is undergoing technical/operational changes before opening, with work ongoing as of 2026. |
| Bayern Kurve | Thomas Bozec (Schausteller from France) | Unknown | Open | |
| Bayern Kurve | Kiener (Schausteller from France) | Unknown | Open | |
| Bayern Kurve | Charly Schweig (Schausteller from Belgium) | Unknown | Open | |
| Bayern Kurve | Kennywood | 1994 | 2020 | Took four-year hiatus from park before returning in 2009. Kennywood announced the ride's removal in November 2020. Acquired by California's Great America to be stripped for parts. |
| Berserker | California's Great America | 1976 | Open | Previously known as Yukon Yahoo. |
| Cortina Jet | Lauwers, hired Godefroid-Schram (Schausteller from Belgium) | Unknown | Open | |
| Bayern's Curve | Canada's Wonderland | 1981 | 2000 | As of 2008, the ride was allegedly shipped to Kings Dominion where it sat in storage. |
| Bayern Kurve | Geauga Lake | 1974 | 1980 | |
| Bayern Kurve | Six Flags New England | Unknown | 1997 | Removed following the 1997 season to make way for the Island Kingdom waterpark. |
| Bayern Kurve | Kings Island | 1973 | 1982 | Relocated to Wonderland Sydney. Appears ride model was replaced during or prior to 1981. |
| Bayern Kurve | Fun Spot | Unknown | 2007 | Possibly opened 2002. Standing but not operating in 2008 when rest of the park was open. Removed from property between 2011 and 2015. Possibly relocated from Six Flags New England. |
| Bayern Kurve | Cedar Point | 1970 | 1984 | Relocated to Valleyfair. |
| Bayern Kurve | Rocky Glen Park | 1984 | 1987 | Located in Moosic, PA; Park closed in 1987 and ride auctioned in August 1988 |
| Bayern Kurve | Valleyfair | 1985 | 1997 | Relocated from Cedar Point. |
| Bayern Kurve | Parque de la Ciudad | 1982 | Closed | |
| Concorde | Playcenter | Unknown | Closed | |
| Cortina Jet | Tykkimäki | Unknown | Closed | |
| Flower Jet | Adventureland | Unknown | Closed | Video footage of this ride can be seen in Chaka Khan's "Love of a Lifetime" (1986) music video as the video was shot in the park at the time the ride was in operation. Ride opened 1979 or earlier. |
| Grand Prix | Blackpool Pleasure Beach | Unknown | Closed | |
| Luv Machine | Funtown Splashtown USA | Unknown | Closed | |
| Mount Kilimanjaro | Kings Dominion | 1976 | Closed | Removed in the 1980s after ridership declined. |
| Olympic Bobs | Coney Island (Cincinnati, Ohio) | 1968 | 1969 | Olympic Bobs variant manufactured by Chance Rides. Cost the park $100,000. Replaced with Galaxi. |
| Pony Express | Bobbejaanland | 1976 | 1996 | |
| Sierra Twist | Six Flags Magic Mountain | 1973 | Closed | Formerly Swiss Twist. Closed in 2007 or 2008. Scrapped in 2008 |
| Skyline Express | Skyline Park | 1999 | 2016 | 2 Loop variant manufactured by BHS. |
| Swiss Bob | Six Flags Great Adventure | 1974 | 1979 | Ride appears to have been added late in planning stages and was not included on original park map. Relocated within park in 1975. Replaced with nearly identical model in 1980. |
| Swiss Bobsled | Six Flags Great Adventure | 1980 | 1991 | Replaced nearly identical model that closed in 1979, sans the themed backdrop. Refurbished in 1990 and removed in 1991. Ride appears to have been intended to be relocated within the park for the 1992 season, but was never re-assembled. |
| Wild Bull, The | Carowinds | 1979 | 1998 | Featured minimal rodeo theming in the center and no backdrop. |
| Wizard's Fury | Wonderland Sydney | 1985 | Closed | Relocated from Kings Island. Closed in 2001 or 2002. Ride demolished 2002 but the structure it passed through remained in place. Ride pad reused for Galleon's Graveyard. |
| Yukon Yahoo | Six Flags Great America | 1976 | 1991 | Ride previously known as Delta Flyer. |
