= Twister III: Storm Chaser =

Roller coaster at Elitch Gardens

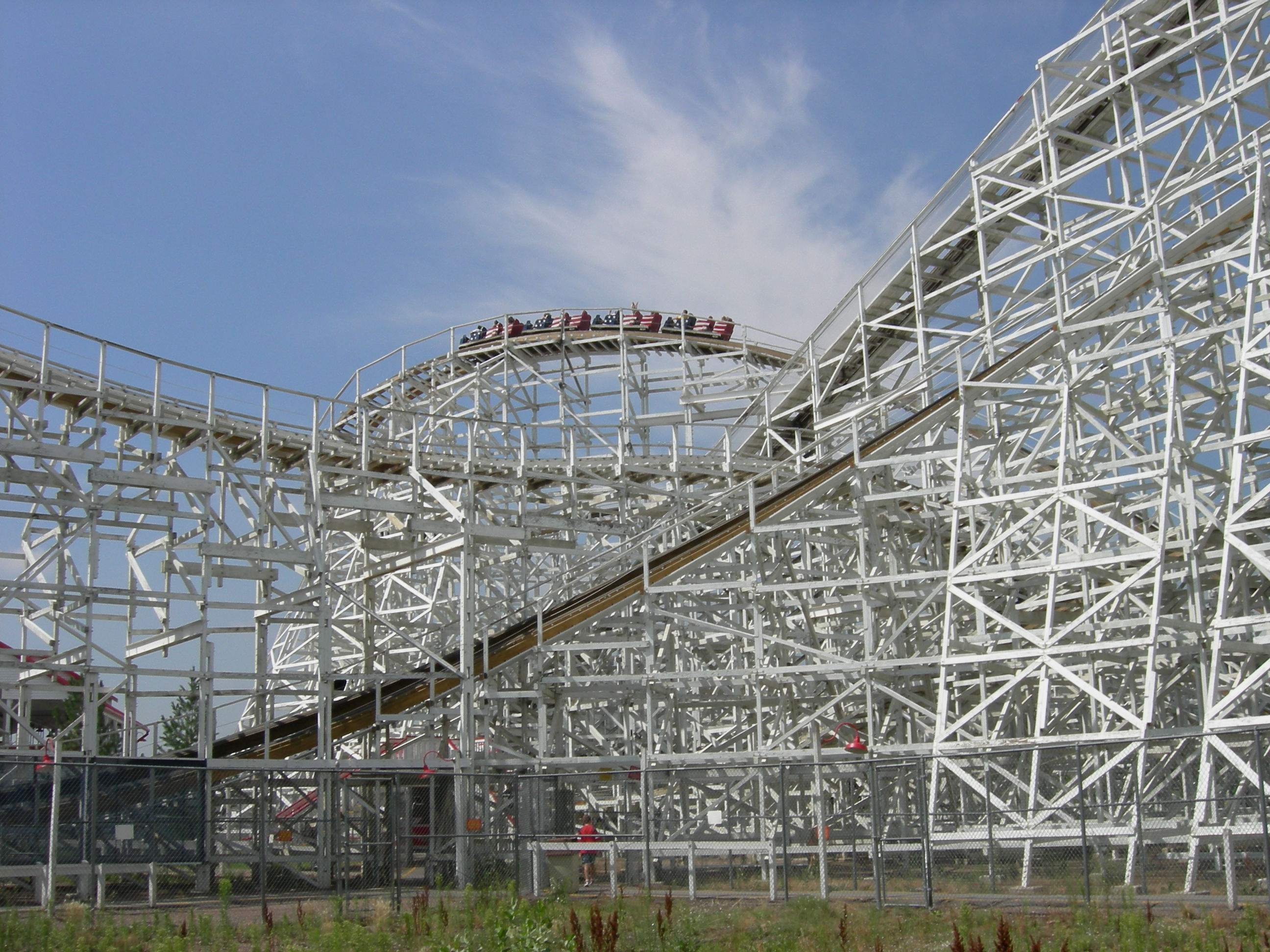
- Twister III: Storm Chaser, the ride is based on the original Elitch Gardens' Mr. Twister roller coaster.

Elitch Gardens
- Location: Elitch Gardens
- Coordinates: 39°44′47″N 105°00′52″W
- Status: Operating
- Opening date: May 27, 1995

General statistics
- Type: Wood
- Manufacturer: Hensel Phelps Construction
- Designer: John Pierce
- Model: custom
- Track layout: Twister
- Lift/launch system: Chain lift hill
- Height: 100 ft (30 m)
- Drop: 91 ft (28 m)
- Length: 4,640 ft (1,410 m)
- Speed: 55 mph (89 km/h)
- Inversions: 0
- Duration: 2:17
- Max vertical angle: 56°
- Capacity: 360 riders per hour
- G-force: 3.1
- Height restriction: 48 in (122 cm)
- Trains: 2 trains with 3 cars; riders arranged 2 across in 3 rows for a total of 18 riders per train
- Twister III: Storm Chaser at RCDB

Twister III: Storm Chaser is a wooden roller coaster located at Elitch Gardens in Denver, Colorado.

This is a custom-built wooden coaster based on the original Mr. Twister coaster, located at Elitch Gardens before the park was moved to its new location in 1995. The roller coaster was designed by John Pierce, who also designed the famous defunct The Rattler wooden roller coaster at Six Flags Fiesta Texas. It was constructed by the Hensel Phelps Construction Co. The trains were made by the Philadelphia Toboggan Coasters company.

In 2023, "Twister II" was renamed "Twister III: Storm Chaser" after being refurbished in the off season.

The motto for the ride is "Built wilder the second time around!"

== Layout ==
=== Queue ===
Riders venture through the queue area as it winds through the middle of the coaster's layout. Once riders head into the station area, there are paintings of the original Elitch Gardens' roller coasters hanging on the wall below the boarding area. Riders then board the Philadelphia Toboggan Coasters trains.

=== Ride Experience ===
Leaving the station, adjacent to the railroad tracks, the track makes a right hand turn to the 100-foot-tall (30 m) lift hill. From the lift hill, riders can view other rides at the park, as well as the Downtown Denver skyline. Leaving the lift hill, trains snake around a swooping 10-foot (3.0 m) drop, mimicking the drop on the original Mister Twister. This is followed by a 90-foot (27 m) drop to the ground, and a rise up into a big turnaround, and another drop. After the second drop, the track goes through a double up type element wrapping around the first drop turn, before making another drop and hill and descending into the big helix. Upon leaving the helix, there is a slight straight segment before dropping to the left, entering a tunnel in the structure of the second turnaround. From the tunnel, a straight segment precedes another turnaround that leads into the final brakes.

Overall, the layout of Twister III has similarities to the Mister Twister, but a noticeable difference is the helix entry. While Mister Twister went down the second drop and into the helix right away, Twister III leaves the second drop and goes up a double up hill, then makes another drop and rise, and enters the helix near the station. Because of this, the entrance to the tunnel does not cross over the second climb.

== Notes ==
Upon opening, Twister II utilized the trains from the original Mister Twister, which had been transported from the old park location to the new one for use on the newly-built coaster. These trains were constructed by Philadelphia Toboggan Coasters (PTC) and consisted of five 2-bench cars with single-position lap bars (known colloquially as "buzz bars"). For the 2003 season, these trains were replaced with new trains of four 3-bench cars from PTC with individual ratcheting lap bars. These trains had a new American flag theme, and the fronts of the trains also got Six Flags 45th anniversary emblems painted on them to celebrate the chains' anniversary. The height restriction was lowered from 52 to 48 inches tall, in keeping with most other wooden coasters. For the 2018 season, the trains were shortened to have only 3 cars each.
