= Afterburner (Fun Spot) =

Steel roller coaster

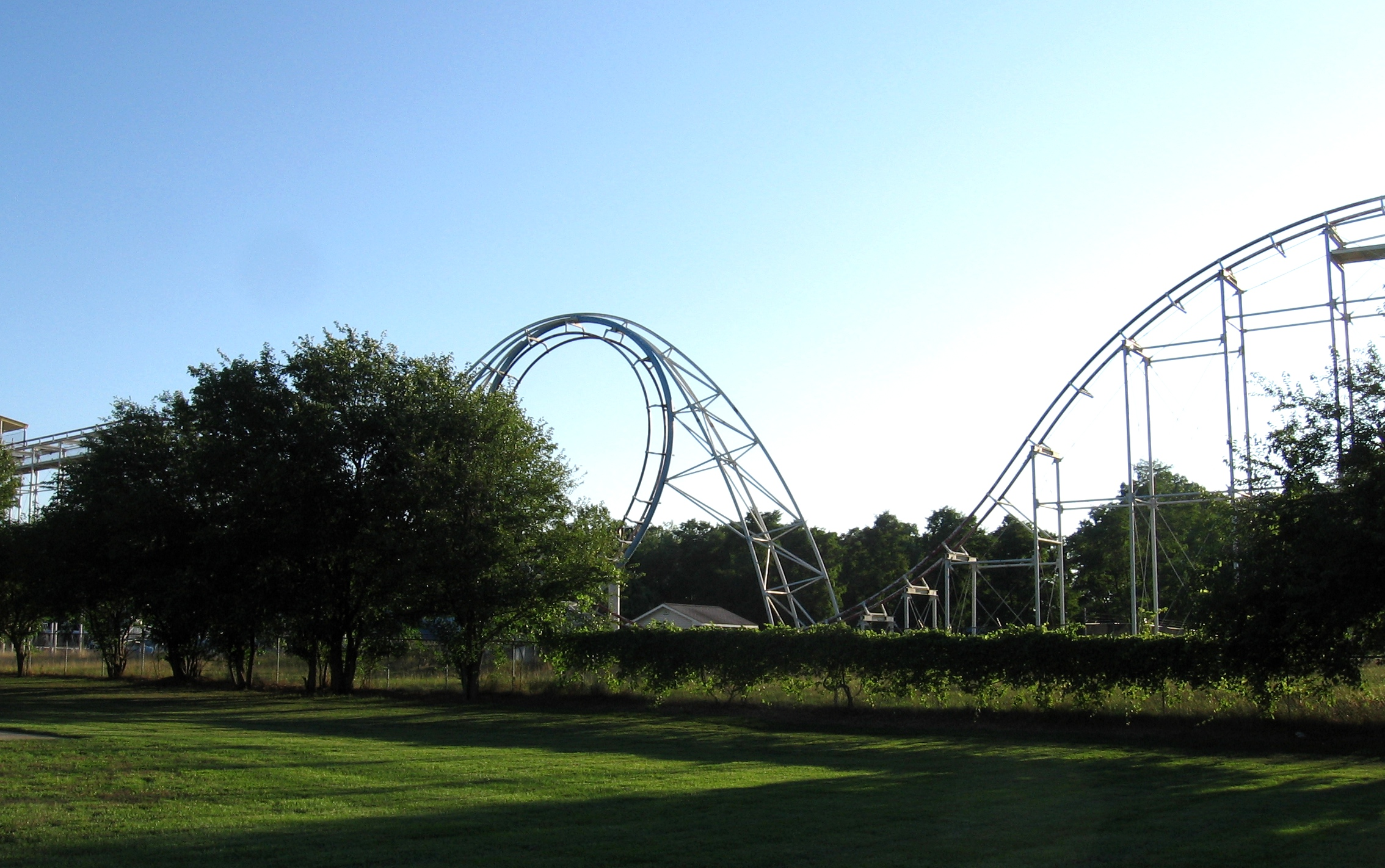
- Afterburner

Fun Spot Amusement Park & Zoo
- Coordinates: 41°40′36.98″N 85°1′52.44″W
- Status: Removed
- Opening date: 1991
- Closing date: 2008

Boardwalk and Baseball
- Coordinates: 28°13′46.4″N 81°38′37.8″W
- Status: Removed
- Opening date: 1977
- Closing date: 1990

General statistics
- Type: Steel – Launched – Shuttle
- Manufacturer: Arrow Development
- Designer: Arrow Development
- Model: Launched Loop
- Track layout: Launched Loop
- Lift/launch system: Electric motor launch
- Height: 56 ft (17 m)
- Drop: 47 ft (14 m)
- Length: 635 ft (194 m)
- Speed: 45 mph (72 km/h)
- Inversions: 1
- Duration: 1:06
- G-force: 4
- Height restriction: 48 in (122 cm)
- Afterburner at RCDB

Afterburner was a roller coaster that operated at Fun Spot Amusement Park & Zoo in Angola, Indiana.

== History ==
From 1977 to 1990, it was known as "Zoomerang", first at Circus World, then at its short-lived replacement, Boardwalk and Baseball. Both parks were located in Haines City, Florida. The coaster is the original prototype of Arrow Development's "Launched Loop" shuttle style coaster. It was also notable for formerly using an elevator to transport disabled passengers to the loading platform.

It was the only operating roller coaster with an inversion in the state of Indiana until 2008 when Steel Hawg opened at Indiana Beach. On March 25, 2009, due to the Great Recession, it was announced that Fun Spot Amusement Park & Zoo would never reopen, sealing the fate of Afterburner.

Afterburner was taken down in early 2017 and its train, launch sleds, controls, brakes, roof and sections of staircases were sent to Frontier City in Oklahoma, where they are used on the Diamond Back coaster.
