= Fun Spot Amusement Park & Zoo =

Amusement park in Angola, Indiana, US (1956–2008)

- Interactive map of Fun Spot Amusement Park & Zoo
- Location: Angola, Indiana, United States
- Coordinates: 41.676462°N 85.029787°W
- Status: Defunct
- Opened: 1956
- Closed: 2008
- Owner: Lee Wright
- Slogan: Where Tigers Meet
- Operating season: June through August (now closed)
- Area: unknown

Attractions
- Total: 30
- Roller coasters: 3
- Water rides: 1

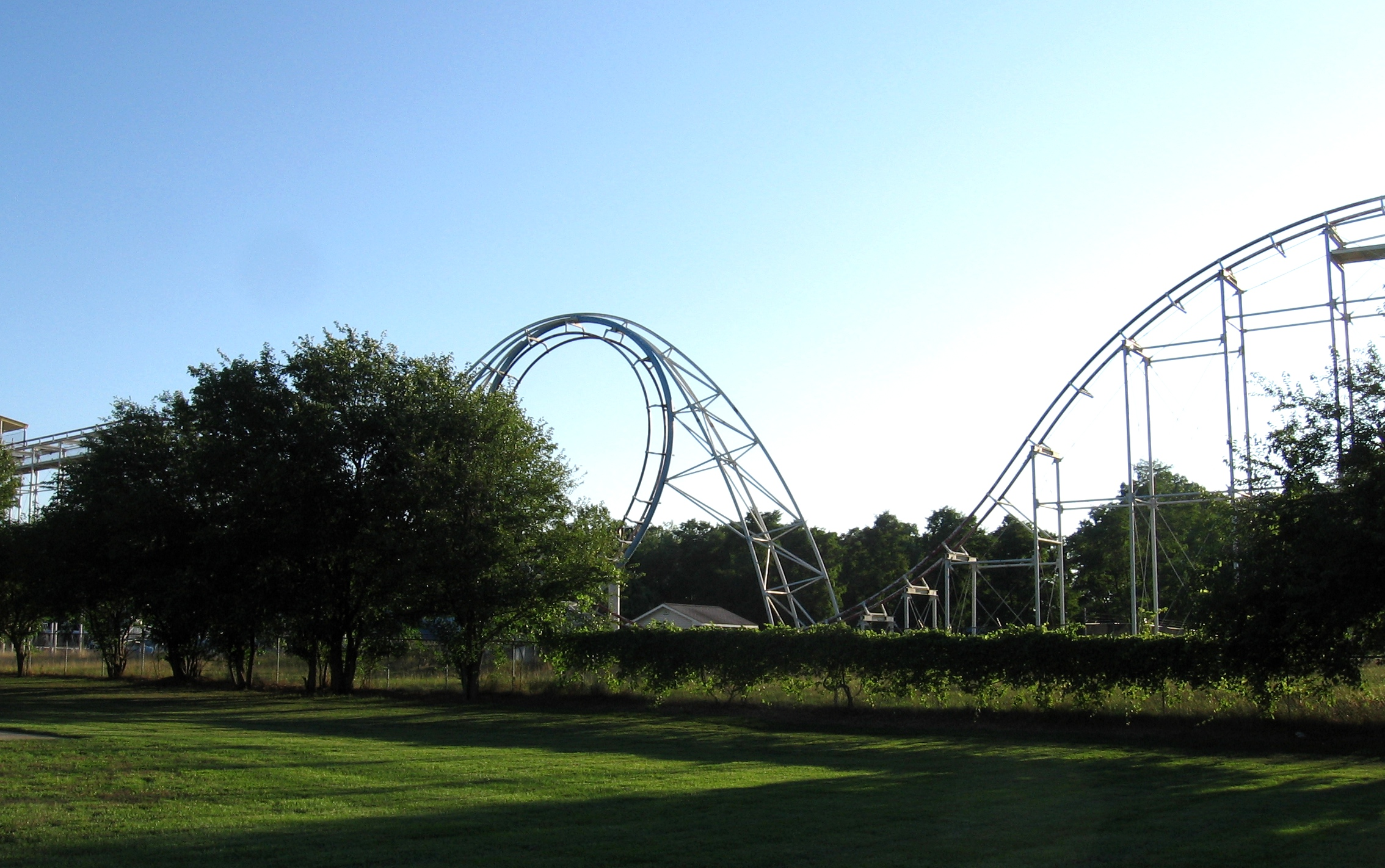
Afterburner rollercoaster

Fun Spot Amusement Park & Zoo was an amusement park located in Angola, Indiana. Although it was small in comparison to parks in neighboring states (such as Cedar Point and Michigan's Adventure), it remained one of the largest parks in the region throughout its existence. It also once boasted the only operating roller coaster (Afterburner) with an inversion in the state of Indiana, until Steel Hawg at Indiana Beach opened in 2008. The park closed in 2008, and on March 25, 2009, it was announced that it would not reopen due to financial issues caused by the Great Recession.

== List of Attractions ==
Name	Manufacturer	Model	Opened	Closed	Details	Ref
Afterburner	Arrow Development	Launched Loop	1991	2008	Original Arrow Development Launched Loop prototype. Relocated from defunct Boardwalk and Baseball. Scrapped in February 2017.	
Calypso	Heinrich Mack GmbH & Co KG	Calypso	2007	2008	Relocated from LeSourdsville Lake Amusement Park, relocated to Holiday World & Splashin' Safari after park closure.	
Flying Scooters	Bisch-Rocco	Flying Scooters		2008	Relocated from LeSourdsville Lake Amusement Park, relocated to Eldridge Park	
Scrambler	Eli Bridge Company	Scrambler		2008		
Balloon Race	Zamperla	Balloon Race		2008		
Space Train				2008	Part of Kiddieland.	
Zyklon	Pinfari	Zyklon Z47	1990	2008	Relocated from Morey's Piers, relocated to Santa's Village AZoosment Park after park closure. Remained standing but not operating at Fun Spot from park closure through 2012.	
Tilt-a-Whirl		Tilt-a-Whirl		2008		
Bumper Cars		Bumper Cars		2008		
Granny Bugs				2008	Part of Kiddieland.	
Troika	HUSS	Troika		2008		
Willie the Whale	Richard Kishel	Concrete Sculpture		2008	A concrete sculpture of a whale, originally located at original location of Indianapolis Zoo and then former water park Boogie Mountain. At one point for sale for $1,500. After leaving Fun Spot in 2015, it spent some time at Indianapolis Museum of Art before being relocated to Foster Park in Kokomo, Indiana.	
Bouncy Room				2008	Part of Kiddieland.	
Kiddie Ferris Wheel	William F. Mangels Company	Miniature Ferris Wheel	2007	2008	Part of Kiddieland.	
Pony Carts	William F. Mangels Company	Pony Carts		2008	Part of Kiddieland.	
Tubs of Fun				2008	Part of Kiddieland.	
Kiddie Swings			2007	2008		
Carousel		Carousel		2008	Part of Kiddieland.	
Chariot Race				2008	Part of Kiddieland. Tracked ride with "horse drawn" carriages. Also referred to as solely "Chariot".	
Ferris Wheel		Ferris Wheel		2008		
Go Karts		Go Karts		2008		
Waterslides				2008		
Sea Dragon	Chance Rides	Sea Dragon (Swinging Ship)		2008		
Paratrooper	Frank Hrubetz & Co., Inc.	Paratrooper		2008	Last ride remaining on property. Present as of at least 2017.	
Roundup	Frank Hrubetz & Co., Inc.	Round-Up		2008		
Glass House				2008		
Wetboats	William F. Mangels Company	Miniature Boat Ride		2008	Part of Kiddieland.	
Hampton Cars	Hampton			2008	Part of Kiddieland.	
Little Dipper Safari Coaster	Allan Herschell Company	Kiddie Coaster / Little Dipper	2002	2008	Part of Kiddieland. Relocated from Adventureland Amusement Park in Indiana, relocated to Bell's Kiddieland in Oklahoma, but never operated there. Standing but not operating at Fun Spot from park closure through 2013.	
Sky Fighter	Grover Watkins	Rockets		2008	Part of Kiddieland.	
Kiddy Swings		Kiddie Swings		2008	Part of Kiddieland.	
Turtles		Kiddie Tumble Bug		2008	Part of Kiddieland.	
Bayern Kurve	Anton Schwarzkopf	Bayern Kurve	2002	2007	Remained standing but not operating after ride, and ultimately park, closed.	
Bulgy the Whale	Eyerly Aircraft Company	Bulgy the Whale		2008	Part of Kiddieland.	

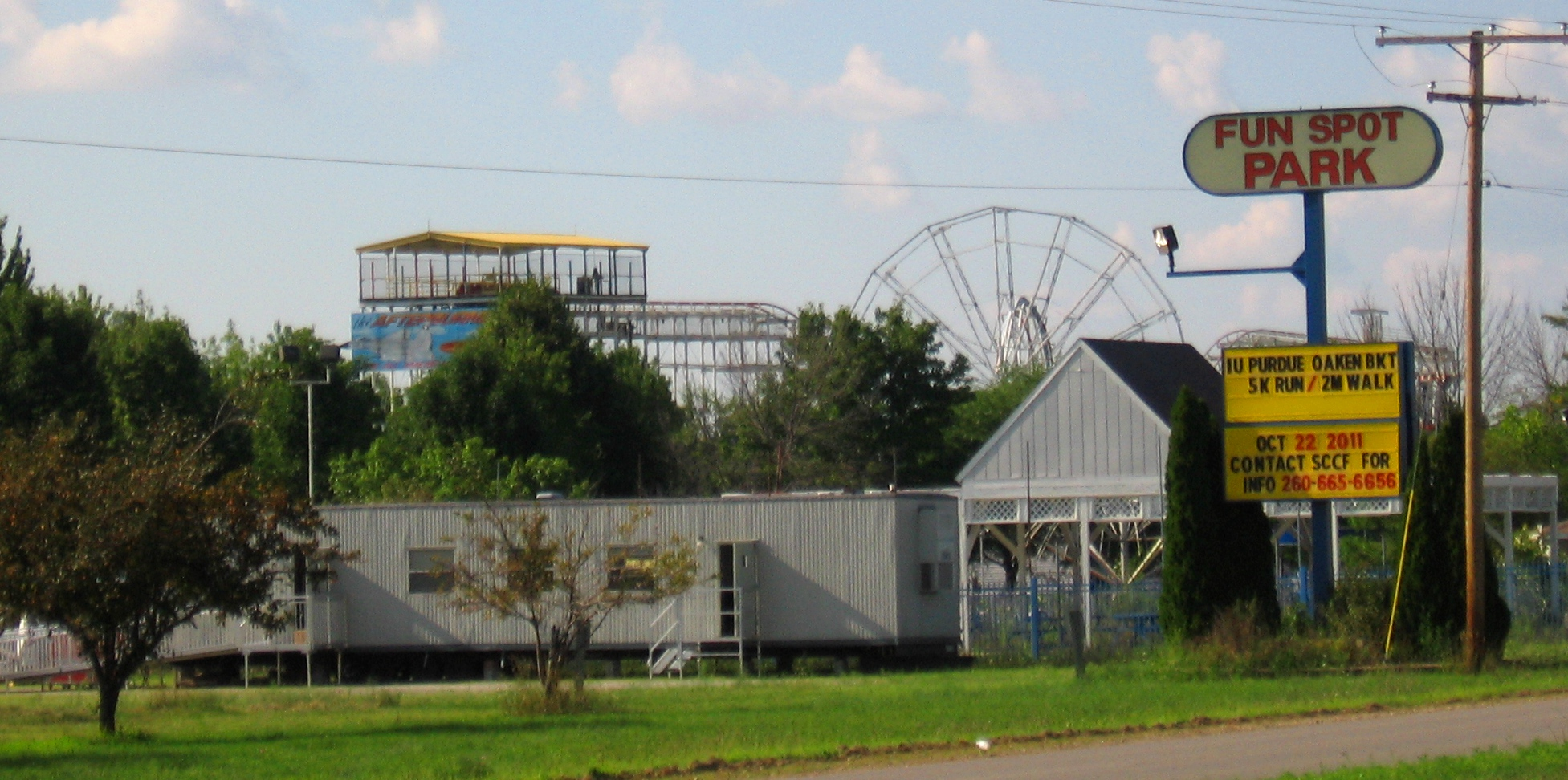
Fun Spot as it appeared in 2011
