= Camden Park (amusement park) =

Amusement park in West Virginia, US

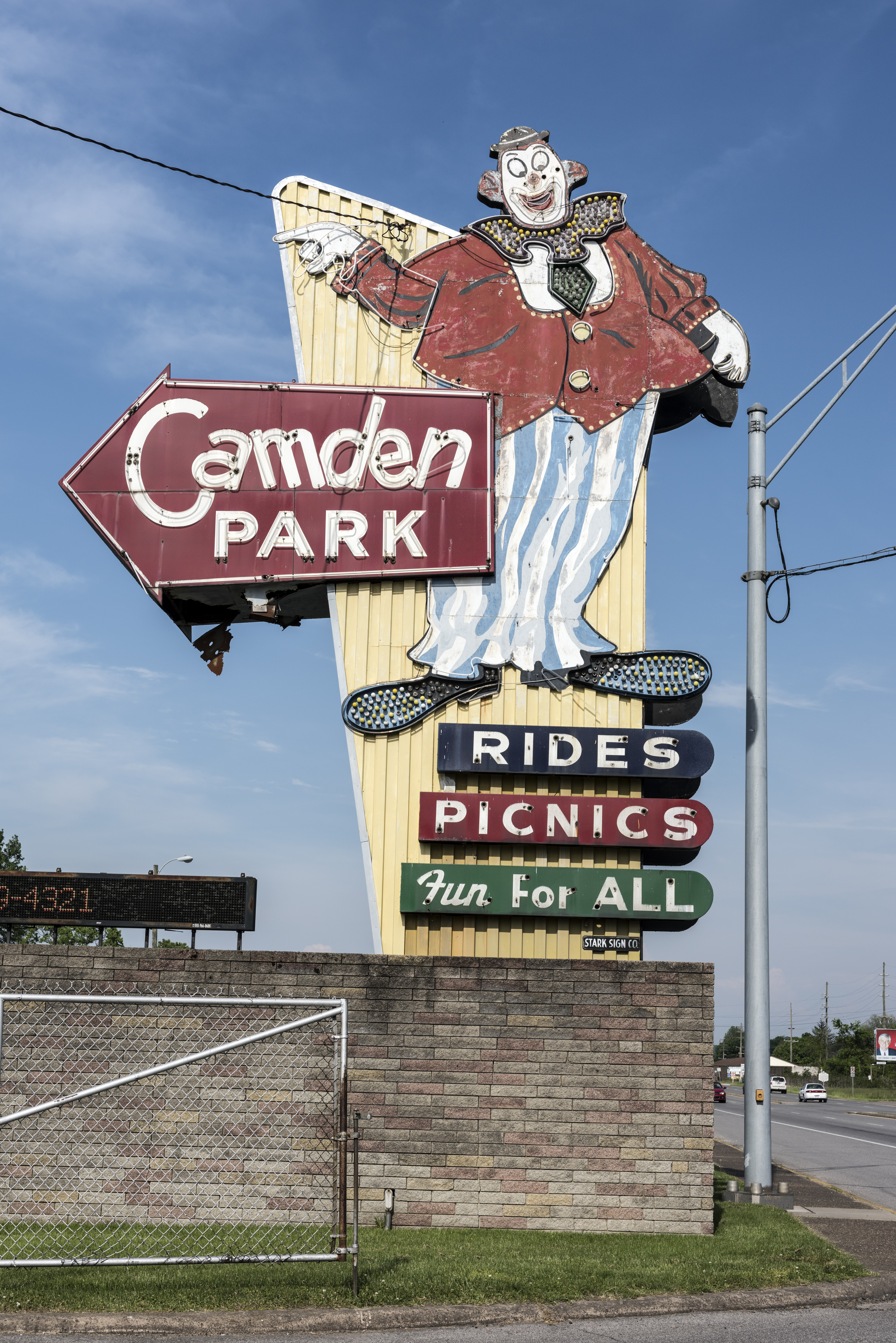
- This happy clown has greeted visitors to Camden Park for several decades.
- Interactive map of Camden Park
- Location: Huntington, West Virginia, U.S.
- Coordinates: 38°23′51″N 82°31′50″W
- Opened: 1903
- Owner: Boylin Family
- Slogan: First in Fun Since 1903!
- Operating season: May - October
- Area: 26 acres (110,000 m^{2})

Attractions
- Total: 25 Operating
- Roller coasters: 3
- Water rides: 2
- Website: Camden Park

Camden Park is a twenty-six acre amusement park located near Huntington, West Virginia. Established in 1903 as a picnic spot by the Camden Interstate Railway Company, it is one of only thirteen trolley parks that remain open in the United States. Whereas most trolley parks were located at the end of trolley lines, Camden Park is unusual in that it was built where riders traveling between Huntington and nearby cities would stop to change lines. Not long after opening, the park soon gained a carousel and other roadside attractions. Camden Park is West Virginia's only amusement park. The park is home to more than thirty rides and attractions, including a full-size traditional wooden roller coaster, the Big Dipper, and several other vintage rides.

Over the years, Camden Park has featured a swimming pool, a roller rink, and even a small zoo. Today, the park hosts a variety of events throughout the year, including live musical performances as part of the "Hot Summer Nights" concert series. Other events include the "Children's Festival," "Coca-Cola Days," and the "Halloween Spooktacular." The park is typically open 4 days a week from late May to early August, with a more limited schedule in late August, and select dates in September and October.

== History ==
Camden Park was established as a picnic spot by the Camden Interstate Railway Company in 1903, and named after former West Virginia Senator Johnson N. Camden. As steamboat traffic gave way to intercity trolleys, the park was located near the mouth of Twelvepole Creek, where riders traveling between Huntington, Ceredo, Kenova, Ashland, and Coal Grove would stop to change lines.

The first amusement park ride, a carousel, was built around 1903; the park owners consider this to be the official date of the park's founding, celebrating the park's eightieth anniversary in 1983, and centennial in 2003; promotional materials produced in 2013 describe the park as having provided "110 years" of fun. About 1912, the park's first roller coaster was added. Described as the "new sensation," the attraction featured a tall hill, a spiraling section, and several dips of various lengths.

Eustace Via purchased Camden Park from the Ohio Valley Electric Railway in 1916, and operated the park until the end of World War II, adding various rides and attractions. The park was subsequently sold to a group of investors, including Harry Nudd, who operated the park. Deeming the original roller coaster unsafe, the owners demolished it in the summer of 1957. Nudd obtained plans for what became the Big Dipper, a new wooden roller coaster that opened in the summer of 1958.

Children enjoying the Umbrella Car ride.

The park subsequently came into the hands of J.P. Boylin, whose family continues to operate the park and its attractions. Many of the attractions are vintage amusement park rides, such as the carousel, The Whip, Tilt-A-Whirl, Paratrooper, Dodgem Cars, and Scrambler. The park also features a miniature railway with a covered bridge, a vintage Pretzel Haunted House ride, swan-shaped pedal boats, a miniature golf course, arcade games, shooting galleries, and a restaurant. The park once featured a roller rink, and a paddleboat attraction known as the Camden Queen, which took riders on a short excursion up the Ohio River.

In the center of the park is an Indian mound, once used as a picnic area, but now heavily grown over with trees. Many large sycamores formerly lined the park's midway, but these appear to have been cut down in the 1990s.

== Major rides and attractions ==
=== Roller coasters ===
Name	Image	Manufacturer	Opening year	Type	Description
Big Dipper		National Amusement Devices	1958	Wooden	Camden Park's most famous attraction, a traditional wooden roller coaster built in 1958. The ride replaced an earlier roller coaster that had been built on the same site about 1912, and which was demolished in 1957. The Big Dipper features original Century Flyer cars with working headlights, and a classic figure-eight track design. The ride's name refers to a big dip measuring almost the full height of the roller coaster after the first turn. A second, shallower dip leads into an unlit tunnel, from which the cars emerge shortly before returning to the pavilion to let off passengers. The Big Dipper is one of only three National Amusement Devices roller coasters still in operation; one of the other two is Camden Park's miniature roller coaster, the Lil' Dipper. American Coaster Enthusiasts lists the Big Dipper as an "ACE Coaster Classic."
Lil' Dipper	None	National Amusement Devices	1961	Wooden	A miniature wooden roller coaster with steel supports.
Slingshot	None	SBF Visa Group	2016	Steel	A figure eight roller coaster with spinning cars and Camden Park's latest ride that opened in May 2016.

=== Other rides ===
Ride	Year opened	Manufacturer	Description
Paratrooper	1965	Hrubetz	A classic amusement park ride featuring ten cars, each large enough for two adults or three children. Each car is suspended from a framework that can be raised and lowered as the cars circle the ride, so that the cars continually rise and fall as they travel. The cars pivot above a canopy, giving the impression of a parachute or umbrella. Camden Park's Paratrooper ride is located on the south side of the park, adjacent to U.S. Route 60, and west of the carousel. During the 1980s and 1990s, each car sported a different color of metallic paint, with a yellow interior. In recent years, the exteriors have been repainted metallic blue.
Carousel	1907	Philadelphia Toboggan Company	An ornate merry-go-round, featuring undulating horses and stationary seats. The park's current carousel celebrated one hundred years of operation in 2007.
Haunted House	1919	Pretzel Amusement Ride Company	A dark ride inspired by ghost stories, monster movies, and mad scientists. The narrow, winding corridors feature sudden and unexpected lights and noises, luminescent paint and models, and animated props. The ride is said to be one of only two gravity-fed Pretzel rides remaining in the United States.
Camden Princess	1999	Zamperla	A customized Rockin' Tug.
Log Flume	1983	Hopkins	A basic log flume ride, featuring two-seated cars molded in the shape of logs; each car can hold from two to six passengers. The cars float down a winding channel surrounded by tall grass, cat-tails and other wetland plants, and are pulled up two hills, from which they rapidly descend, resulting in large splashes. Camden Park's log flume was constructed in 1983, as part of the park's 80th anniversary celebration. The ride is located in the northeastern portion of the park, and typically has the park's longest lines on hot summer days.
Miniature Train	1980	Crown Metal Products	A miniature railroad, featuring a replica steam locomotive and four cars with wooden bench seating and one fully open side. In the 1980s and 1990s, the cars were decorated in a wild west theme, and each was named for a city made famous in western folklore, including Dodge City and Tombstone. The ride begins near the midway, and circles the northeastern portion of the park, passing through a covered bridge before turning for home. Until the 1980s, the wild west theme was portrayed with life-sized dioramas of Indian attacks on settler cabins; as the train passed, riders heard and saw gunfire from the rifles, and saw fallen settlers and panicked housewives. The dioramas were removed in the 1990s, but recently a Hatfield–McCoy motif has been added in their place.
Kite Flyer	2001	Zamperla	A ride in which the riders lie flat and experience a sensation similar to hang-gliding.
Tilt-A-Whirl	1990	Sellner Manufacturing	A classic ride, featuring seven gondolas attached by center pivots to an undulating floor. As the ride speeds up, the gondolas turn in a circle around the center pivot, sometimes picking up enough speed to fling riders against the backs of their seats.
Flying Scooters	2006	Larson International	A ride consisting of a center post with ride vehicles suspended from arms attached to the center post.
Skyliner	1970s	Hopkins	A chairlift ride, which gives two or three riders an aerial view of the park. Riders board and get off again in the center of the park, just south of the miniature railroad tracks. The ride parallels the southern path of the railroad tracks, and overlooks the miniature golf course and part of the parking lot. In the 1980s and 1990s, the ride was painted bright orange, but since that time it has been repainted in lime green.
Swan Lake	1970s	Hopkins	A paddleboat ride located in the northern end of the park, between the log flume and the Tilt-A-Whirl. The boats are shaped like giant swans.
The Rattler	2018	SBF Visa Group	Riders are suspended from an overhead axis and go through dual swinging and spinning motions.
The Whip	1924	William F. Mangels	A classic flat ride, built at Coney Island by William F. Mangels; one of a handful still in existence. Another is the Kiddie Whip featured among Camden Park's children's rides.

- West Virginia Adventure Golf - An 18-hole miniature golf course, designed by Castle Golf, featuring various West Virginia-themed landscapes, including a grist mill, covered bridge, cabin, chapel, and various animatronic figures. One hole depicts a shootout between the Hatfields and the McCoys. The course is located on the site of an earlier miniature golf course, and the former Thunderbolt Express.
- Mound Builder Pavilion - a covered outdoor picnic area and stage where live musical performances are featured. The pavilion is named for the park's Camden Park Mound.

=== Kiddie Land ===
Ride	Year opened	Manufacturer	Description
Junior Whip	1930	William F. Mangels	A miniature Whip ride located near the park entrance, together with other children's rides.
Dune Buggies	1980	Unknown	A set of miniature cars that follow a preset track.
Skyfighter	1945	Allan Herschell Company	A children's airplane ride.
Handcars	1950	Unknown	A series of hand-powered sledges that travel along a path of winding rails. This ride is adjacent to the park entrance.
Boat ride	1941	Allan Herschell Company	A miniature boat ride designed for younger children; the two-seater gondolas appear to be floating in water.
Pony Carts	1957	S.D.C.	A miniature, flat carousel-style ride for small children. This ride is located near the skyliner, just south of the miniature railroad.
Umbrella Car Ride	1950	Hampton	A flat, carousel-style ride for small children, featuring automobiles, trucks, motorcycles, and other vehicles.

== Former rides and attractions ==
- Bull's Eye – A roundup wheel ride that goes in diagonal directions. Formerly known as The Rainbow. It was closed following the 2016 season and replaced with Slingshot.
- Camden Park Zoo – located North of the train station; it was removed in the early 1970s.
- Caterpillar – a classic amusement park ride operated at Camden Park in the 1950s. The cars followed an undulating circular track. A similar Music Express-type ride, the Hot Cat, was featured at the park from the 1990s to 2011.
- Cloud 9 – located between the Little Dipper and the railroad tracks in the early 1980s.
- Dodgem Cars – a traditional bumper car ride from the 1940s; a series of center islands consisting of firmly anchored tire bumpers usually keeps traffic moving counter-clockwise, but cars can pass between the islands to engage one another and cause chaos. In the 1980s and 1990s, the cars were painted in glossy orange, yellow, green, blue, white, and black. Destroyed by an electrical fire in July 2013.
- Enterprise – a fast, looping, inverted "Ferris wheel"-like ride, featuring a mural of the Starship Enterprise from Star Trek: The Next Generation. The ride was closed in 1993, after a hydraulic malfunction resulted in injuries to more than fifty riders.
- Fun Slide – a tall, multi-lane slide that stood between the Little Dipper and the railroad tracks in the early 1980s. Riders climbed a long series of stairs, and slid down one of the lanes on a burlap mat. Camden Park's slide featured blue lanes, and its steps were painted brown.
- Hot Cat – a Music Express-type Caterpillar ride, the Hot Cat featured a train on an undulating circular track, half of which was enclosed in a darkened shed-like structure. The exterior was brightly lit with flashing lights, while loud music played both inside and out. The Hot Cat was a featured attraction at Camden Park from the 1990s to 2011, but was dismantled in 2012. It stood south of the Big Dipper, and west of the Paratrooper and Magic Rainbow.
- Hurricane – a classic Hurricane ride manufactured by Dartron Industries. Camden Park's Hurricane ride was painted blue with yellow cars, each adorned with the name of a famous hurricane from the 1950s or 1960s, including Audrey, Betsy, Beulah, Camille, Carol, and Hazel. The ride was a fixture of the park during the 1980s, and was located in the park's northeast corner, behind the log flume, and next to the Tilt-a-Whirl. It was replaced by the Kite Flyer.
- Miniature Golf – in the 1970s and 1980s, a miniature golf course was located north of the skating rink. This area was later occupied by the Thunderbolt Express. A new, 18-hole miniature golf course has opened in its place.
- Roller Coaster – Camden Park's first wooden roller coaster, originally described as the "new sensation." Riders were taken to the top of a tall hill, then sent down a gentle dip, and then into a counter-clockwise spiral, followed by an elliptical course featuring several smaller dips, and returning to the pavilion. Painted white, the roller coaster was complemented by a red-roofed tower adjacent to the top of the first hill. This ride was demolished in the summer of 1957, and construction began on the Big Dipper, which opened the following summer.
- Scrambler – an Eli Bridge ride in which riders are spinning in cars that look like they will crash into each other.
- Skydiver – a "looping ferris wheel" ride, opened in 2001 on the site of the former Camden Park skating rink. The ride was closed following the 2009 season, and was replaced by the Rockin' Tug, in a different location, for 2010.
- Spider – A classic amusement park ride, featuring eight arms, each with two independently spinning two-seater cars (larger Spiders sometimes featured four cars per arm). The cars traveled diagonally in a circle, and paused to let riders on and off at the lowest point, until all of the cars were occupied. This left some riders suspended at the ride's highest point, pointing upwards at the sky, and a large sycamore to the south of the Camden Park Mound. For many years, the Spider was located along the park's midway, between the restaurant and the Indian mound. It was closed and dismantled following a 2011 accident, in which one of the arms broke off and fell to the ground, injuring three riders. Camden Park's Spider was painted black, with white car interiors, and was usually illuminated after dark with yellow and white fluorescent tubes and clear incandescent bulbs; toward the end of its life, the yellow fluorescent bulbs were replaced by red.
- Tip-Top – a flat ride manufactured by Hrubetz featuring ten tub-like cars, each with two bench seats and a large, horizontal wheel in the center. The ride would spin and be propelled upward by compressed air. Each car would spin independently, and riders could influence the speed and direction of their spin by pulling or pushing against the wheel. In the 1980s this ride was located south of the Camden Park Mound, between the Scrambler and the Spider. The Flying Scooters ride has occupied this location since 2006.
- Thunderbolt Express – a shuttle roller coaster, originally known as Kings Island's Screamin' Demon ride. The Screamin' Demon was closed and sold in 1987, and reopened at Camden Park for the 1988 season, immediately north of the skating rink, on land that had previously been used as a miniature golf course. As the Thunderbolt Express, the ride operated until 1999, when it was closed following a circuit board malfunction. The ride never re-opened, and was dismantled in 2004 after falling into disrepair.
- Yo-Yo – a classic amusement park ride, featuring a series of swings suspended on long chains from a rotating upper carousel. This ride was located south of the Big Dipper, immediately west of the Paratrooper and Magic Rainbow rides during the late 1980s. Camden Park's was painted yellow, with black and white trim. The same type of ride had previously been operated at Camden Park in the late 1970s.

== Popular culture ==
- Camden Park is a location in the video game Fallout 76.
- One of Camden Park's rides makes an appearance in the opening titles to the TV adaptation of the podcast My Brother, My Brother and Me. The hosts of the show, Justin McElroy, Travis McElroy, and Griffin McElroy are natives of Huntington, and have made reference to the theme park in their podcast.
- Camden Park appears in the opening credits of the found-footage horror film, The Houses October Built.
