= Sidewinder (Elitch Gardens) =

Steel roller coaster

- Previously known as Roaring Tornado at Magic Springs & Crystal Falls
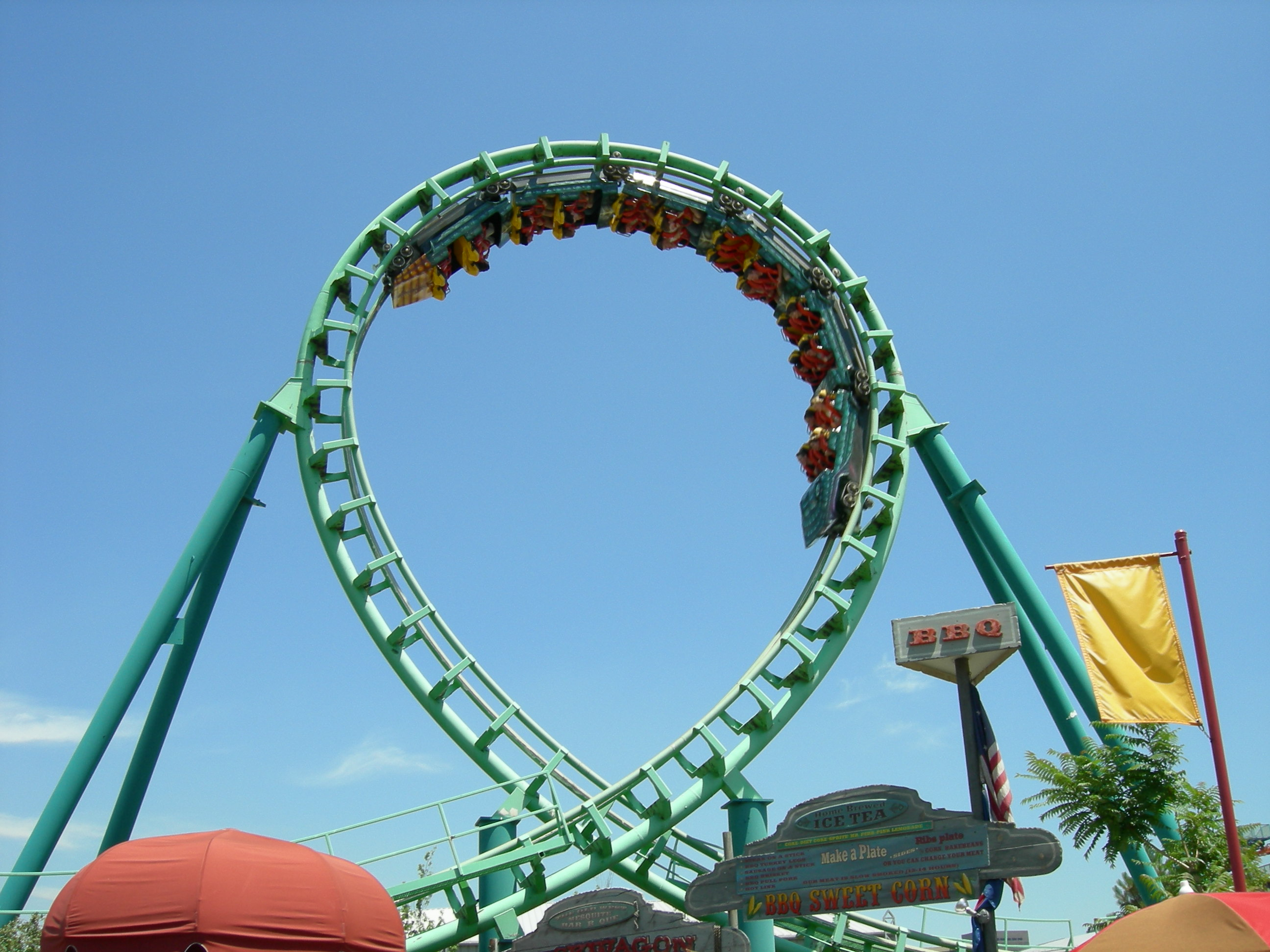
- Sidewinder's Loop

Elitch Gardens
- Coordinates: 39.748614°N 105.012612°W
- Status: Operating
- Opening date: May 27, 1995

Magic Springs & Crystal Falls
- Coordinates: 34.519°N 93.016°W
- Status: Removed
- Opening date: 1980
- Closing date: 1989

General statistics
- Type: Steel – Launched – Shuttle
- Manufacturer: Arrow Dynamics
- Designer: Arrow Dynamics
- Model: Launched Loop
- Track layout: Shuttle Loop
- Lift/launch system: Launch
- Height: 56 ft (17 m)
- Drop: 47 ft (14 m)
- Length: 635 ft (194 m)
- Speed: 45 mph (72 km/h)
- Inversions: 1 (traversed twice)
- Duration: 1:06
- Max vertical angle: 47°
- Capacity: 400 riders per hour
- G-force: 4.0
- Height restriction: 48 in (122 cm)
- Trains: Single train with 6 cars. Riders are arranged 2 across in 2 rows for a total of 24 riders per train.
- Sidewinder at RCDB

Sidewinder is a steel roller coaster located at Elitch Gardens in Denver, Colorado.

This is a fairly simple coaster that takes rides through one loop. Instead of starting from the ground, riders have to ascend stairs fifty feet up to the loading station. The train is launched down a hill, goes into the loop, then ascends a slope opposite of the station with a braking section. The train repeats the layout backwards, and returns to the station.

Before being operated at Elitch Gardens this roller coaster was at the Magic Springs & Crystal Falls amusement park as the Roaring Tornado. The coaster operated at the original Elitch Gardens from 1990 to 1994, then was relocated to the current Elitch Gardens in 1995.

It is one of only three Arrow Dynamics launched loop coasters to be operating around the world, the others being Diamond Back at Frontier City, and the Revolution at Blackpool Pleasure Beach.

The ride has received new paint for the 2010 season, and is now more of a lime green than the darker shade it has been since being repainted from its original white.

In 2014, riders were trapped after mechanical issues stopped the ride.

In 2025, the ride was reopened after two years of closure.
