= Elitch Gardens Theme Park =

Amusement park in Denver, Colorado, US

- Previously known as Elitch Zoological Gardens (1890–1900); Elitch Gardens (1900–1998, 2006–present); Elitch Gardens – The Great Escape (1996–1999); Six Flags Elitch Gardens (1998–2006); Elitch Gardens Theme and Water Park (2011–present)
- Interactive map of Elitch Gardens Theme Park
- Location: 2000 Elitch Cir. Denver, Colorado, United States
- Coordinates: 39°45′2″N 105°0′40″W
- Status: Operating
- Public transit: RTD: at Ball Arena–Elitch Gardens
- Opened: 1890–2014, (original 1890–1994); 1995 (current 1995–2014); 2015–present
- Owner: KSE Radio Ventures, LLC (2015–present)
- Operated by: Premier Parks, LLC (2015–present)
- Operating season: May–October (theme park) Summer (water park)
- Area: 65 acres (260,000 m^{2}) total

Attractions
- Total: 40
- Roller coasters: 6
- Water rides: 2
- Website: http://www.elitchgardens.com

Elitch Gardens Theme & Water Park, colloquially known as Elitch's (formerly known as Elitch Zoological Gardens, first and second incarnation of Elitch Gardens, Elitch Gardens – The Great Escape and Six Flags Elitch Gardens), is an amusement park in Denver, Colorado. It is owned by KSE Radio Ventures, LLC and operated by Premier Parks, LLC. It is open April through October.

== History ==
=== Gurtler era (1994–1995) ===
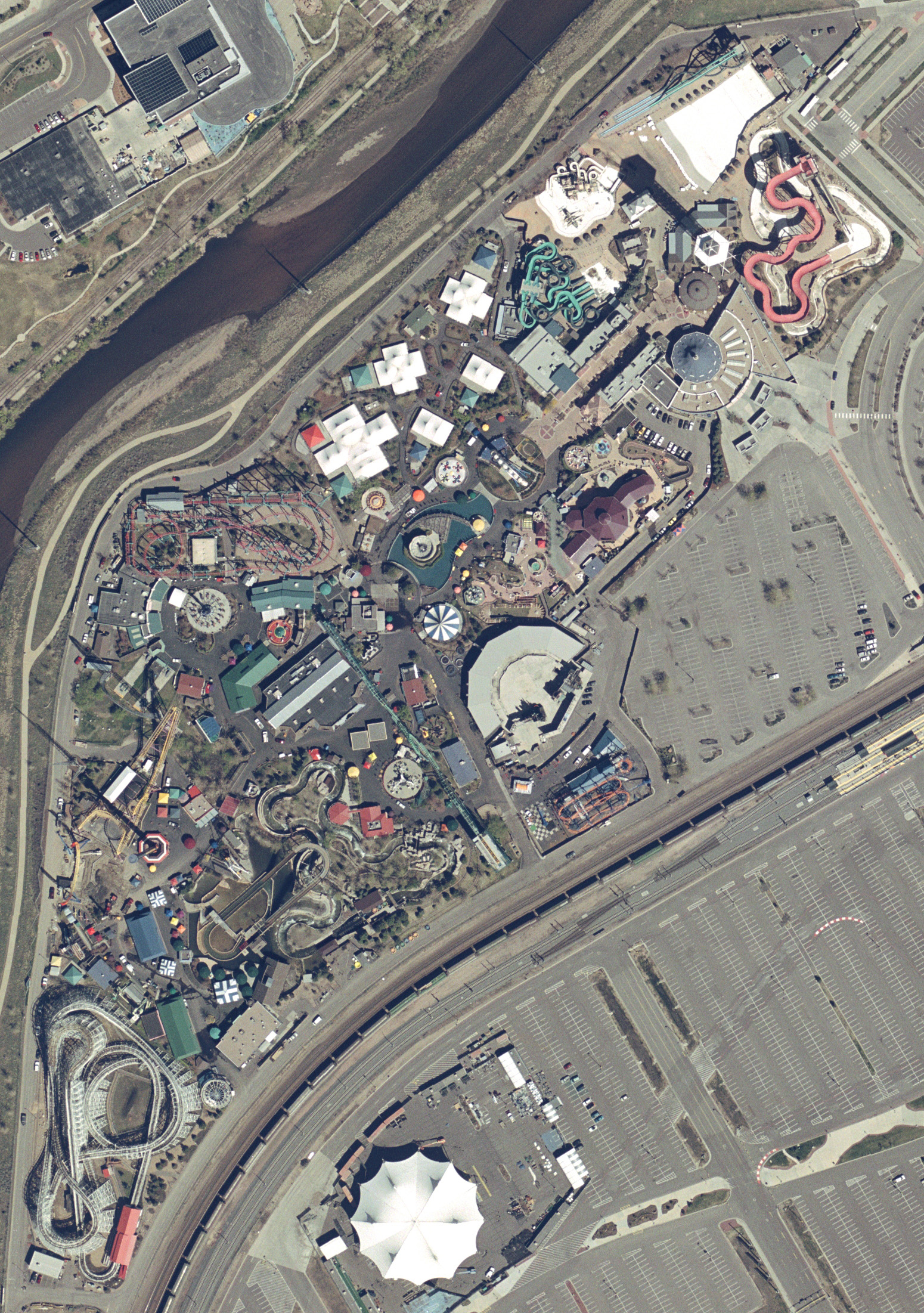
Satellite view from April 2004 (top of image faces north). New Half Pipe coaster under construction. (Lower left corner).

As space was getting scarce at the original location of Elitch Gardens at 38th Avenue and Tennyson Street, the Gurtler family and their financial partners purchased a 67.7-acre (274,000 m^{2}) plot of land in the Platte River valley near downtown Denver for $6.1 million in June 1994. $90 million was spent relocating some rides from the original park and construction of the new park, funded by a mix of public and private dollars and various loans.

On October 1, 1994—the end of the 1994 season—the original park closed permanently and a majority of the rides were moved to the new property, which opened on May 27, 1995. Attendance was about one million the first year there, lower than the expected 1.2 million. Some notable rides at the park's opening were the original Carousel and Sidewinder roller coaster, relocated from the old park; and a new version of the Mister Twister, the Twister II.

In October 1996, the Gurtler family and its partners sold the park to growing theme park operator Premier Parks for $65 million.

=== Premier era (1996–1998) ===
Premier noted the lackluster figures the new park had in its first two seasons, which resulted in new additions for the park's third season in 1997. The first and most notable addition that year was the park's third roller coaster, Mind Eraser, a Suspended Looping Coaster by Vekoma. The next big addition was Tower of Doom, an Intamin freefall ride that stands at 220 feet (67 m). Also added was the park's 700-seat Trocadero Theater, named after the famous ballroom and dance hall at the original park. The price tag for these additions came to a total of $28 million.

Throughout this short era, the park had "The Great Escape" as a surname underneath the park's name in its logo, like most of its sister parks at the time, (Darien Lake, Riverside Park, and The Great Escape)

In April 1998, Premier Parks purchased the Six Flags Theme Parks from Time Warner. With this acquisition, Premier re-branded some of their other parks as new Six Flags theme parks as part of a deal made between Time Warner and Premier. Elitch Gardens was one of these parks, with many notable changes to be made.

=== Six Flags era (1999–2006) ===
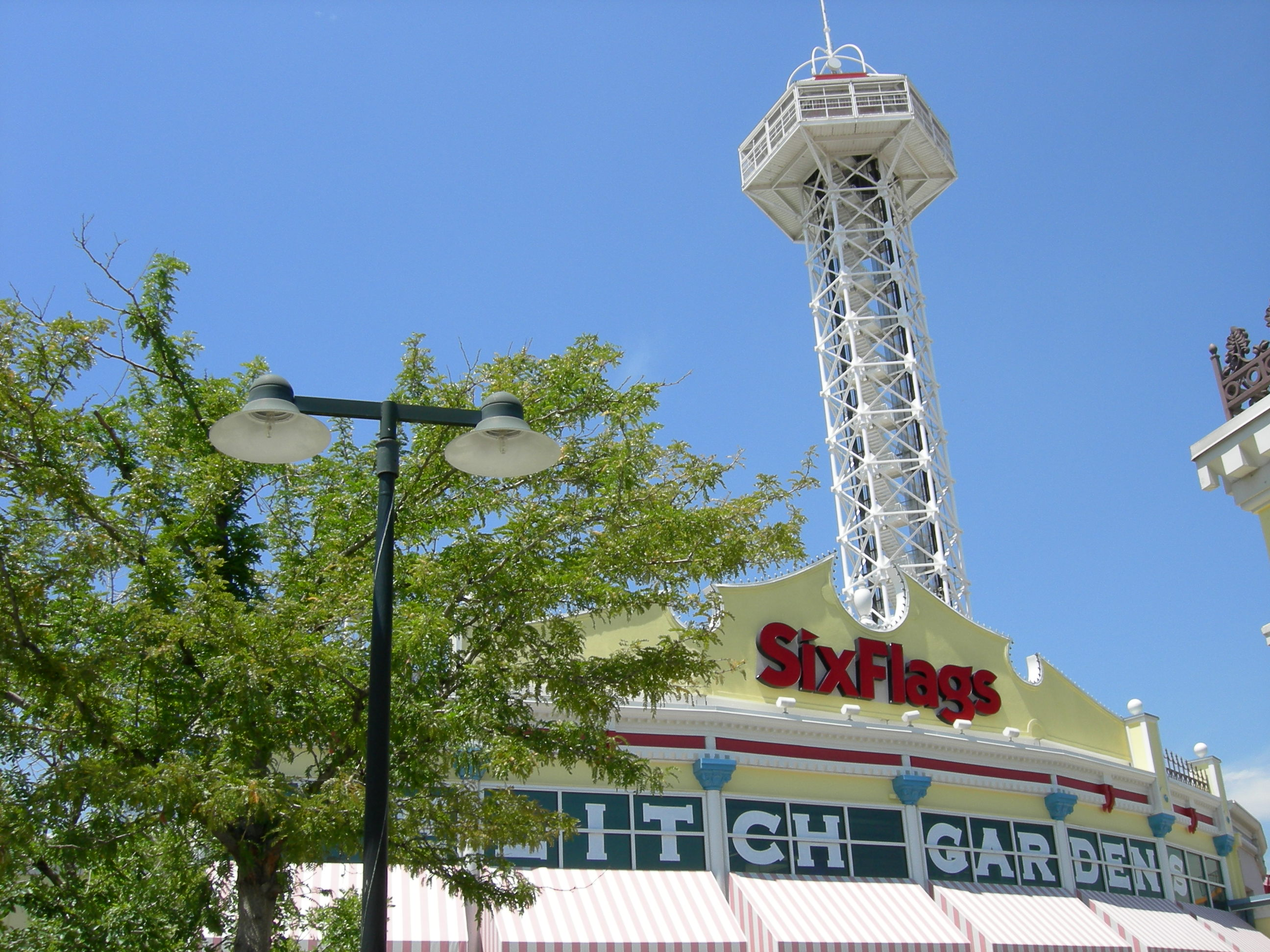
The main entrance of Six Flags Elitch Gardens

Numerous additions came in 1999 when the park was officially rebranded Six Flags Elitch Gardens. The first and most notable addition as a Six Flags theme park was Boomerang: Coast to Coaster. Various Warner Bros. properties, including the Looney Tunes and DC Comics franchises, were also introduced, including costumed characters and shows.

From 1999 to 2001, other additions, such as the new Looney Tunes Movietown area of the park, as well as water rides and flat rides were installed.

In 2002, the park added Flying Coaster, a suspended steel flying roller coaster. It was a prototype model, and suffered from numerous operational glitches. It ceased operation in 2008, and was eventually sold to Luna Park in Coney Island in 2010, where it was installed in 2011 after being refurbished and updated by ride manufacturer Zamperla.

In 2004, the park installed the Half Pipe coaster, one of three operating in the United States.

In 2005, Six Flags removed Chance-Morgan Chaos flat rides for safety reasons. The same year, the park added a vertical water slide called Edge to its Island Kingdom water park.

Also in 2005, control of Six Flags was obtained by Washington Redskins owner Daniel Snyder, in a proxy fight following a shareholder revolt, which led to Kieran Burke being ousted as CEO. Snyder installed friend and former ESPN executive Mark Shapiro as the company's new CEO.

The park faced a grim future in 2006 when Shapiro announced that the company would sell off six of its properties. Costumed workers and entertainment workers were laid off as a part of cost-cutting.

As of May and June 2026, since the acquisition of the operation rights from Premier Parks, LLC. and the re-introduction of Six Flags Darien Lake by Six Flags as of 2018 and 2019, Elitch Gardens is one of the former Six Flags theme parks that has not yet to be re-acquired by Six Flags since Premier Parks, LLC owns the park following its sale in 2006.

=== PARC Management era (2006–2010) ===
In October 2006, Six Flags announced that Elitch Gardens, along with six other parks, would be sold for a total of $312 million. The agreement saw them sell the properties to PARC Management, who in turn sold them to CNL Lifestyle Properties. CNL would then lease them back to PARC Management under a 52-year triple-net lease.

Immediate changes under the new management included the removal of all Looney Tunes and DC Comics branding and dropping Six Flags from the park's name reverting to the Elitch Gardens name. In late October 2006, a new ProSlide Bowl water slide, named RipQurl, was added for the 2006 season. In 2008 a new interactive dark ride, Ghost Blasters, opened. It takes guests through a dark mansion haunted with ghosts. Using light guns, guests have the opportunity to extinguish the ghosts while competing against one another as digital counters keep track of the scores. Alongside the new rides, the park hosts a summer concert series which has included Raven-Symoné, Metro Station, Sara Evans, and Lee Ann Womack. It also has live entertainment shows, such as "Survivor Live!", and "Sea Lion Splash!" The ones for 2010 were "Rocknation: Don't Stop Believin'", "Bob the Builder Live: Let's Recycle!", "120 Rockin' Years at Elitch's" and "Laser Rocks". During October it has haunted houses and a Trick or Treat Trail.

=== CNL Lifestyle Properties era (2011–2014) ===
However, after less than three years into the 52-year contracts, CNL terminated their agreements with PARC Management in November 2010. The move came after, according to their 2010 SEC filings, PARC defaulted on their lease obligations on the properties. In early 2011, CNL appointed Herschend Family Entertainment as the new operators of the park, along with Darien Lake.

On March 8, the park announced three new rides, Tube Top (a Proslide Tantrum waterslide) in Island Kingdom Family Water Park, Rockin' Tug, and Tike Bikes both in the newly transformed kid's area, KiddieLand.

In 2013, the park's operation was transferred from Herschend Family Entertainment to CNL Lifestyle.

=== Premier Parks LLC era (2015–present) ===
On June 5, 2015, the park was purchased by an investment team made up of Revesco Properties, Kroenke Sports Entertainment, and Second City Real Estate. Operation remained under the control of Premier Parks, LLC.

Due to the growing concerns of the COVID-19 pandemic, Elitch Gardens announced a delay of the 2020 season operations. On July 31, 2020, with the ongoing pandemic, the park announced that the park will not operate at all for the remainder of 2020. The cancellation is the first time in 130 years, that the park closed down for an entire season, with the park's entire 130th season instead being deferred to 2021.

=== Future of Elitch Gardens ("The River Mile" redevelopment) ===
In March 2018, the owners of Elitch Gardens, Revesco, revealed the redevelopment plan for the theme park. Elitch Gardens was considered to be aging and in need of relocation, and considered to be a "donut hole" surrounded by the denser center of the city.

On December 17, 2018, the Denver City Council voted 12–0 in favor of giving Revesco Properties permission to begin the project.

No further details, including a permanent closing date for Elitch Gardens or relocation have been announced. However, there are rumors that it will relocate. As of 2025, Elitch Gardens is still operating for the season.

In June 2025, Kroenke Sports Entertainment acquired Revesco Properties' interest in the River Mile development, making KSE the sole owner of the property. KSE said that Elitch Gardens and Meow Wolf will continue to operate at their current sites, KSE said. Executive Vice President Mike Neary said the amusement park is a "rite of summer" for over a million visitors each year, and they intend to keep it that way and "better than ever."

== Entertainment & Events ==
In 1998, Six Flags' Fright Fest debuted at the park. The event was typically held at the end of the operating season (October) until 2006.

When the park was sold to PARC Management in 2006, a replacement event for Fright Fest named "Fall Family Fun Fest" added family oriented areas such as hay mazes and pumpkin painting, as well as haunted houses and trick or treat trails.

In 2007, "FrightFest" was reinstituted, but with a lack of space between the words "Fright" and "Fest" in order to avoid legal trouble with Six Flags. The event continued on for several years, including 2011–2014 when Herschend Family Entertainment managed the property. The park is currently managed by Premier Parks, LLC, who continues to host the event.

=== Island Kingdom Family Water Park ===
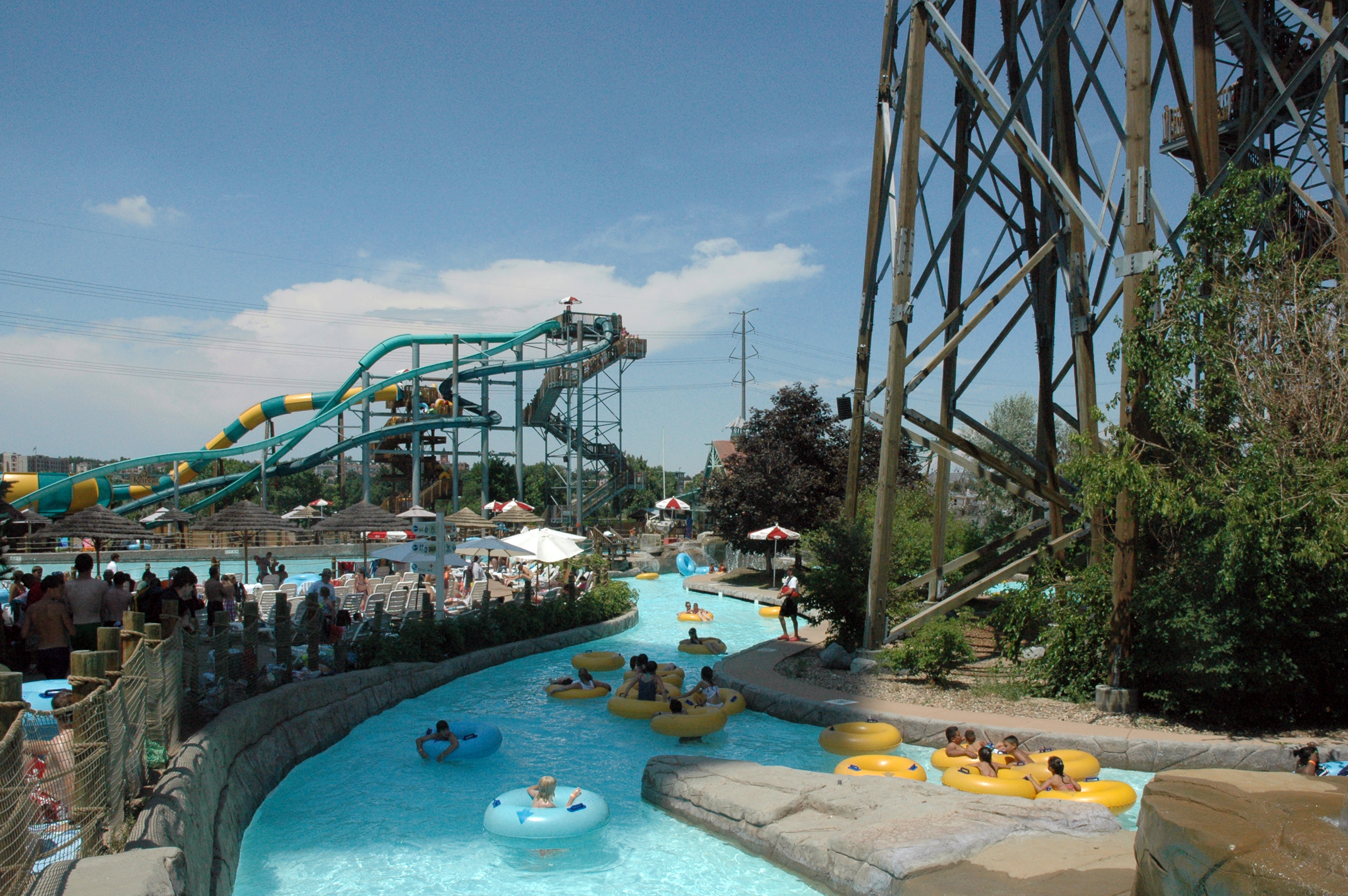
Island Kingdom in 2009

Island Kingdom is a 20-acre (81,000 m^{2}) family water park located next to the entrance of Elitch Gardens. It is open in Summer, and admission is included with admission to Elitch Gardens. It has several main attractions: a large tube slide tower, a family body slide tower, a family water playground, a large family raft ride, a half pipe water attraction, and a lazy river.

== Public transportation ==
Ball Arena–Elitch Gardens station, a light rail station served by Regional Transportation District (RTD), is located next to the park's entrance. It is served by the C, E, and W light rail lines.

== Rides ==
=== Roller coasters ===
Ride	Year opened	Manufacturer	Description
Twister III: Storm Chaser	1995	Hensel Phelps Construction	A John Pierce designed wooden coaster based on the original Elitch Gardens Mister Twister. The old coaster proved too costly to move with the park and was in bad condition. This coaster opened with the new park in 1995 as Twister II and was renamed after a 2023 renovation.
Sidewinder	1995	Arrow Dynamics	An Arrow Dynamics shuttle loop roller coaster. Moved from the original Elitch Gardens and originally built in 1980, it was relocated from Magic Springs and Crystal Falls park as the Roaring Tornado
Mind Eraser	1997	Vekoma	A Vekoma SLC (Suspended Looping Coaster). Riders are suspended below twisted track.
Boomerang	1999	Vekoma	A Vekoma Boomerang roller coaster. Formerly called Boomerang: Coast to Coaster.
Half Pipe	2004	Intamin	An Intamin Half Pipe Coaster. Two free-spinning pods of seating are propelled on a platform between two vertical towers, similar to the skateboard ramp of the same name.
Blazin' Buckaroo	2013	E&F Miler Industries	An E&F Miler family roller coaster. Relocated from Alabama Splash Adventure and operated as Marvel Mania from 1998 to 2011.

=== Thrill rides ===
Ride	Opened	Manufacturer	Description
Brain Drain	2014	Larson	A 7-story steel looping thrill ride that rocks forwards and backwards, gaining momentum to eventually follow through a series of forward and backward full loops, in which riders are fully inverted.
Hollywood & Vine	1995	HUSS	A Breakdance themed with 1980s-era futuristic cars, and named after the famous intersection of Hollywood and Vine in Hollywood, Los Angeles. Relocated from the old Elitch Gardens, it was formerly known as "Paradise" and originally built in 1987.
Sling Shot (upcharge attraction)	2006	HUSS	A 160-foot (49 m) reverse bungee attraction that rockets riders skyward at 70 mph (110 km/h). Available for a nominal additional fee. Previously located at Kentucky Kingdom.
Star Flyer	2017	Funtime	A swing ride that opened in spring 2017. Located next to Brain Drain and in the spot where Shake, Rattle and Roll used to occupy. The height is around 200-foot (61 m).
Tower of Doom	1997	Intamin	A 210-foot (64 m) Intamin drop tower that drops up to two groups of four people at a time. Originally installed with a third ride car, for a total capacity of 12 riders per cycle. One ride car and corresponding track have since been removed from service.
Turn of the Century	1999	Vekoma	A Wave Swinger with ancient Egyptian/Aztec paintings on it. Relocated from the old Elitch Gardens and originally built in 1973. It remained in storage until 1999.
XLR8R (upcharge attraction)	1996	Ride Entertainment Group	A 182-foot (55 m) Skycoaster that is available for a nominal additional fee.
Observation Tower	1995	Premier Rides	An observation tower 300 feet (91 m) tall with the observation platform at 250 feet (76 m). One of the seven new attractions to debut at the new park at 1995. Previously branded "Total Tower". It is permanently closed.

=== Family rides ===
Ride	Opened	Manufacturer	Description
Big Wheel	1995	Chance	A Giant Wheel model Ferris wheel ride over 100 feet (30 m) tall. The Big Wheel was restored in 2010, including the addition of a programmable LED lighting array, which has become a recognizable feature of the Central Platte Valley night skyline.
Carousel	1995	Philadelphia Toboggan Company	A fully restored 1920 Philadelphia Toboggan Company, PTC #51 merry-go-round featuring 76 hand-carved horses and 4 chariots. A 1909 Wurlitzer style #155 Military Band Organ (model nicknamed "Monster") provides the carousel's music.
Dragonwing	1998	Chance	A Chance Aviator with a dragon theme. First Aviator installation worldwide; prototype installation was rebuilt and reinstalled to final specifications after the first season of operation. Known as "Batwing," under Six Flags.
Meow Wolf's Kaleidoscape	2019	Sally Corporation/Oceaneering Entertainment Systems (OES)	A psychedelic shooting dark ride designed by the art group Meow Wolf It was new for the 2019 season and replaced Ghost Blasters.
Rockin' Tug	2012	Zamperla	A Rockin' Tug boat ride that rotates clockwise and counterclockwise while rocking back and forth.
Sea Dragon	1995	Morgan	A Viking longship that rocks back and forth. Relocated from the old Elitch Gardens. Riders experience high g-forces. Originally built in 1980.
Spider	1995	Eyerly	A classic Spider ride relocated from the old Elitch Gardens. Originally built in 1969. Relocated several times.
Tea Cups	1995	Zamperla	A Teacups ride relocated from a park in Germany. Originally built in 1988. One of seven rides to debut at the new park for 1995.
Tilt-A-Whirl	1995	Sellner	A Tilt-A-Whirl relocated from the old park. Originally built in 1957.
Troika	1995	HUSS	A Classic Troika ride relocated from the old Elitch Gardens. Originally built in 1976.

=== Kids' Rides ===
Ride	Opened	Manufacturer	Description
Al's Big Rig Trucking Co.	1997	Zamperla	A Convoy Trucks ride. Semi truck-themed cars follow a fixed track around and back to the station.
Balloon Race	1997	Zamperla	A Balloon Race ride. Riders sit in balloon-basket-themed cups that lift into the air and rotate around a central point.
Crazy Bus	1996	Zamperla	Riders sit in rows of a single bus-themed vehicle that rises into the air and falls, following a pair of parallel arms, experiencing positive and negative G-force.
Ding Dong Dock	1996	Allan Herschell Company	A Kiddie Boats ride. Boats rotate around a central column in a shallow pool of water, each having a bell for riders to ring by shaking a rope attached to a clapper.
E.G. Express	1998	Zamperla	A Rio Grande Train ride. A train-themed ride vehicle follows a set path along a rail and back to the station.
Jumping Jack	2005	Zamperla	A Jumpin' Star drop tower ride. Riders are launched upward, then downward repeatedly through pneumatic actuation.
KidSpin	2000	Zamperla	A Miniature version of the park's Teacup ride. The current theming features ride units as colored paint cans and a colorful painted backdrop.
Magic Bikes	2000	Hampton Amusements	A Mini Motorcycles ride. Riders sit atop motorcycle-themed vehicles that rotate around a central point, rotating up and backwards as if popping a wheelie. Themed music plays throughout.
Mouse House	2003	Sartori Rides	A Children's Bumper car ride.
Sunflower Swings	2005	Sartori Rides	A Mini Swings ride. Similar to Turn of the Century, Dragonwing and Star Flyer, except that the ride does not rise from the ground.

=== Water rides ===
Ride	Opened	Manufacturer	Description
Disaster Canyon	1995	O.D. Hopkins	A basic white water rafting ride by Hopkins. Built new in 1995, it opened with the new park. It opens around Memorial Day and closes before Labor Day.
Shipwreck Falls	1997	O.D. Hopkins	A Shoot-the-Chutes that ends in a massive splash. Other related parks operate Shoot-the-Chutes under the same name.

== Water Park Rides ==
Ride	Year opened	Description	Manufacturer
Acapulco Cliff Dive		Wavy Speed Slide	
Cannonball Falls		Two Enclosed Slides	
Castaway Creek		Lazy River	
Commotion Ocean		Wave Pool	
Gangplanks		Two river-run slides	
Hook's Lagoon		Water Playground	
Paradise Pipeline		Corkscrew Speed Slide	
Sun Plunge		Speed Slide	
Splashdown		Family Raft Slide	

== Past rides ==
Ride	Added	Closed	Description
Edge	2005	2014	Edge water slide that was added in 2005 has now been removed from the park. Some call it the water version of the half pipe roller coaster. Only lasting 10 years the Edge was a fairly new ride, it was sold with plans to relocate it to a different water park.
Shake Rattle and Roll	1995	2014	Shake Rattle and Roll, a Huss Top Spin originally known as the Avalanche, being one of the rides to debut at the opening of the relocated park downtown, was demolished due to its old age and frequent breakdowns.
Rainbow	1995	2010	After many years of being a favorite in the park, this Huss Rainbow was finally taken down due to waning popularity from an accident in 2008.
Western Round-Up (flat ride)	1995	2001	Relocated from a park in Germany and debuted at the new park, this Vekoma Sky Flyer ride was dismantled in 2001 due to major maintenance issues. Though reasonably popular, it was standing idle half the time. Originally built in 1985.
Holland Express	1995	1998	This classic Reverchon Himalaya ride was one of the rides moved from the original Elitch Gardens. As maintenance costs rose due to the ride's age, it was removed in 1998. A newer incarnation of the ride, the Thunderbolt, once filled its place Originally built in 1964 but was removed from the park in 2020.
Mine Shaft	1995	1998	This Chance rotor ride was removed due to the controversy over a similar ride at Six Flags Great America. Rather than modify the ride as many other parks did, Elitch Gardens dismantled it in 1999. Originally built in 1972 and traveled on carnival routes. It was also at the old Elitch Gardens for a short time.
Sky Ride	1995	1997	A standard Watkins aerial chairlift ride, it stood for two years until the opening of the Island Kingdom water park prevented it from remaining open. It was one of the rides moved from the original park and was built in 1965.
Run-Away Train	1995	1997	A Mack Blauer Enzian powered roller coaster, it was bought used from a park in Germany and was originally built in 1987. Upon inspection, the "hot rail" that powered the train was badly damaged. This ride only ran for two seasons and Mind Eraser now stands in its place.
Flying Coaster	2002	2007	A Zamperla "Volare" roller coaster that is the first of its kind in the United States. It was a beta version of the coaster design, which made maintenance excessively expensive. The roller coaster was refurbished by the manufacturer and installed at Coney Island.
Casino	1995	1998	This Wipeout/Trabant ride was another ride moved from the old park. Even though it was in good running condition, Elitch Gardens couldn't find room for it among the newer rides.
Chaos	1999	2010	A Chance-Morgan Chaos ride that flips its riders upside down while spinning and lifting in the air at the same time. Removed due to safety issues.
Cactus Coaster	1995	2011	An Allan Herschell Company "Little Dipper" kiddie coaster relocated to Frontier City as Wild Kitty in 2013.
Ghost Blasters	2008	2018	An interactive dark-ride built by Sally Corporation where riders would shoot ghosts and compete for the highest score. Closed in 2018 and re-themed by Meow Wolf for the 2019 season.
Thunderbolt	1996	2019	A Chance Alpine Bobs ride near the back of the park. Removed after the 2019 season.

== See also ==
- Incidents at CNL Income Properties parks
