= Vuoristorata =

Roller coaster at Linnanmäki in Helsinki, Finland

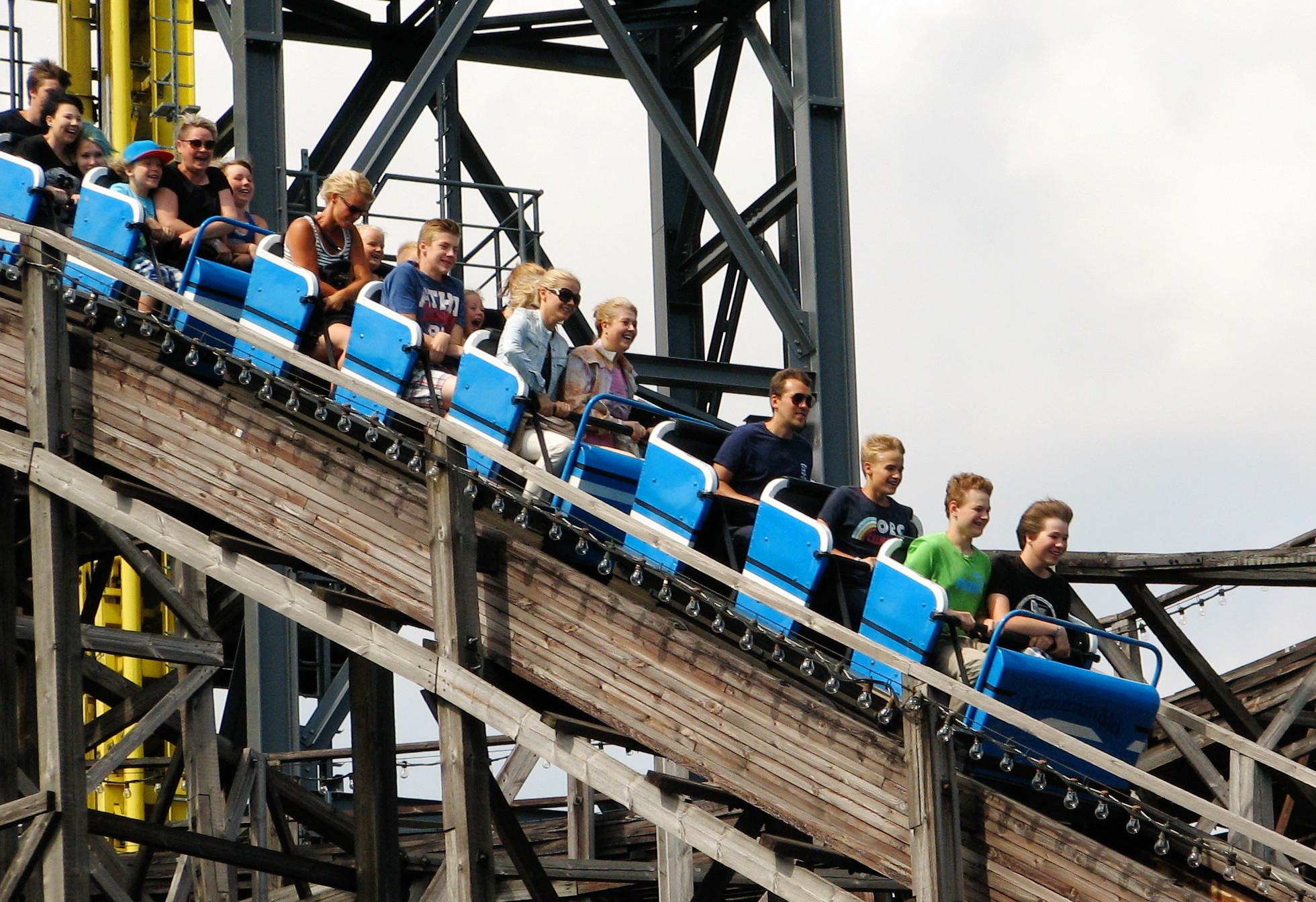

Linnanmäki
- Location: Linnanmäki
- Coordinates: 60°11′19″N 24°56′30″E
- Status: Operating
- Opening date: 13 July 1951; 74 years ago
- Cost: 48 million FIM (1951); 1.62 million EUR (in 2021 euros, inflation-adjusted)

General statistics
- Type: Wood – Side friction
- Manufacturer: Linnanmäki, led by Svend Jarlström
- Designer: Valdemar Lebech
- Lift/launch system: Cable lift hill
- Height: 24 m (79 ft)
- Length: 960 m (3,150 ft)
- Speed: 60 km/h (37 mph)
- Inversions: 0
- Duration: 2:15
- Capacity: 1,320 riders per hour
- Height restriction: 140 cm (4 ft 7 in)
- Trains: Usually 3 and up to 4 trains with 4 cars each. Riders are arranged 2 across in 3 rows, except for the brakeman's car at the back in 2 rows, for a total of 22 riders per train.
- Vuoristorata at RCDB

Vuoristorata (Finnish: [ˈʋuo̯ristoˌrɑtɑ]; lit. 'Rollercoaster') is a wooden roller coaster located at the Linnanmäki amusement park in Helsinki, Finland. It was built in the winter of 1950 by Linnanmäki's staff on the basis of drawings by Valdemar Lebech, a Danish builder specialising in fairground rides. The construction work was led by the Danish ride operator Svend Jarlström, who at the time owned most of Linnanmäki's rides. Opened on 13 July 1951, Vuoristorata was the largest roller coaster in the Nordic countries and the tallest in Europe at the time. Expected to last up to 15 years, it was originally designed as a temporary attraction for the amusement park, opened in 1950. One of the main reasons for its construction was to attract tourists from the 1952 Summer Olympics held in the city. Since then, its temporary status was renewed for extended periods, until it was eventually regarded as a permanent structure.

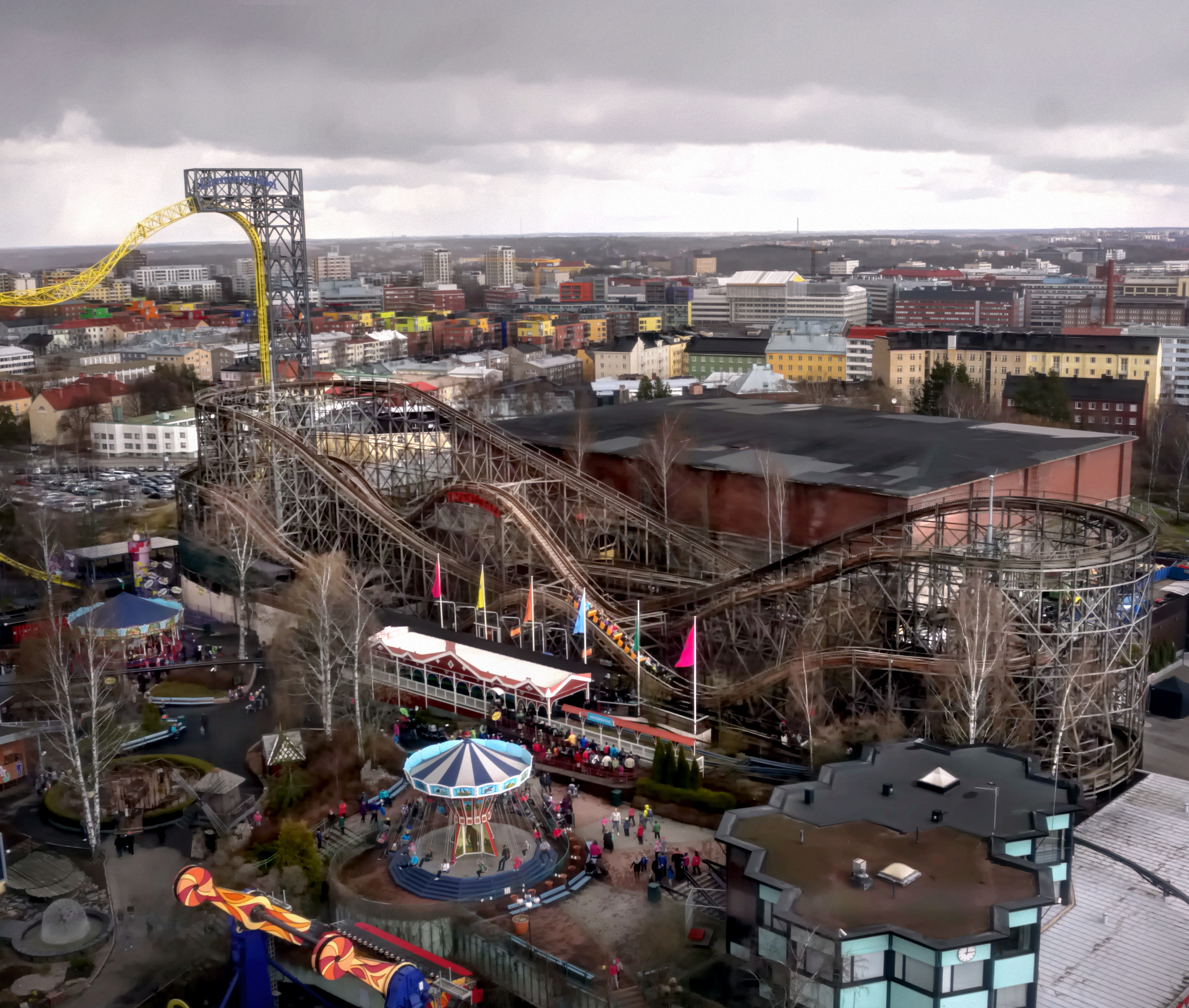
Vuoristorata as seen from Panoraama

Since its opening in 1951, Vuoristorata has been the most popular ride at Linnanmäki every year, with around 47,000 rides per season. It is the most famous amusement ride in Finland, and a symbol of the Linnanmäki park; even the old park logo had a shape representing the ascents and descents of Vuoristorata. Vuoristorata has never had a name other than the common noun used for roller coasters; Vuoristorata simply means "roller coaster" in Finnish (lit. vuoristo = mountain range, rata = track; "mountain range track").

Vuoristorata is a slightly larger copy of another roller coaster, Rutschebanen, opened in 1932 at Dyrehavsbakken in Denmark. Valdemar Lebech, who designed both of these among a number of other tracks, simply took the original blueprints of Rutschebanen, enlarged them for Linnanmäki and designed Vuoristorata. Back in the 1950s, Rutschebanen and Vuoristorata were the two tallest roller coasters in Europe; Vuoristorata is 108 metres longer at 960 m (3,150 ft) and two metres taller at 24 m (79 ft). Vuoristorata is also notable for being the last roller coaster in the world to have been built using side friction technology, which means that there are no inclines at the track's turns. Modern roller coasters also have up-stop wheels that hug the bottom of the rail, preventing the train from coming up off the track; Vuoristorata does not have such wheels.

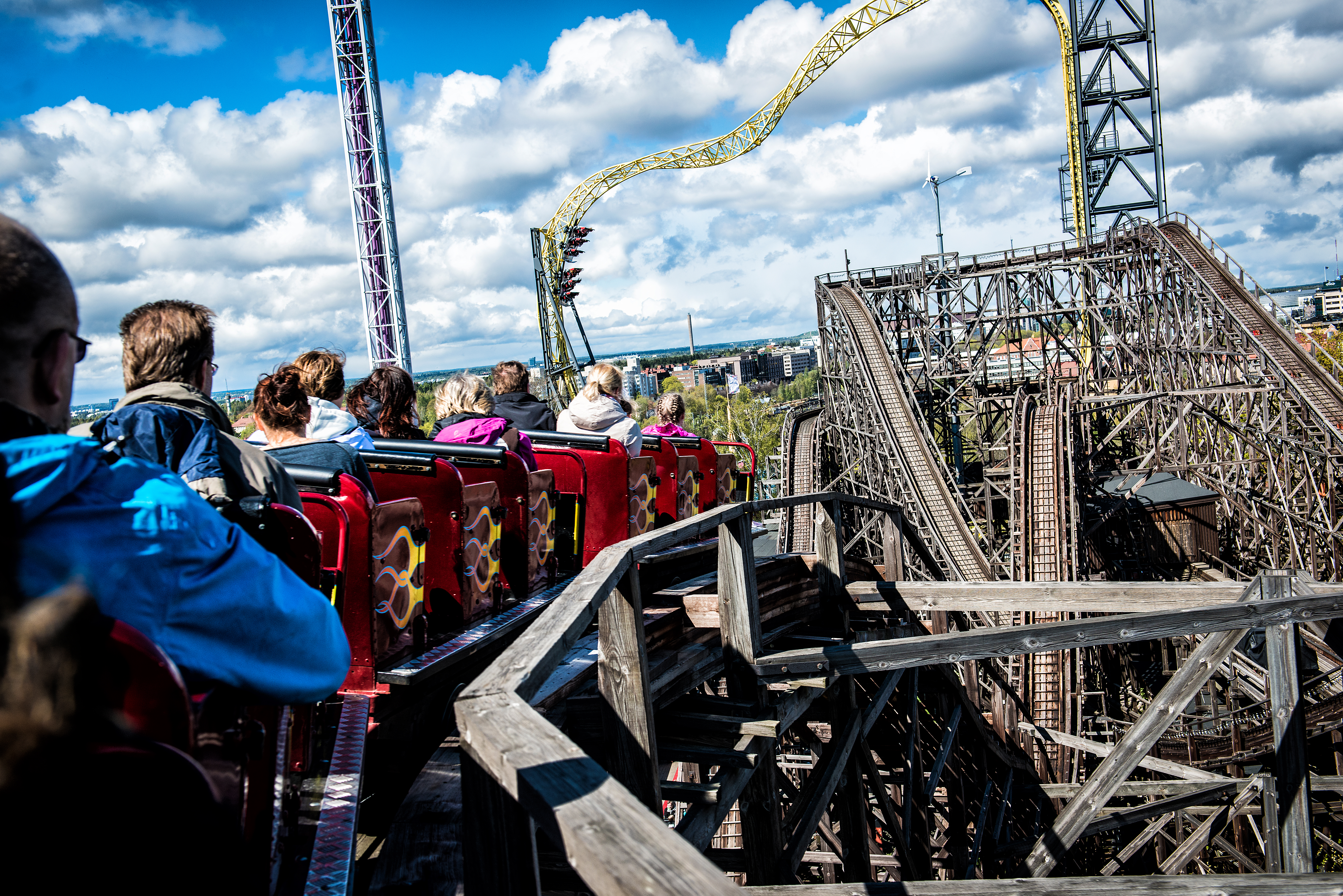
On Vuoristorata

On Vuoristorata, braking during the journey is carried out by a brakeman standing at the rear of the train. Vuoristorata is one of only six remaining operating roller coasters in the world still run by brakemen; four others are in Europe and one is in Australia. In the past, there used to be many such roller coasters in the world, but Rutschebanen at Dyrehavsbakken, for example, later got new trains with automatic brakes. In June 2021, Linnanmäki switched to gender-neutral job titles, as a result of which the former title "brakeman" (Finnish: jarrumies) is now called the "brakemaster" (jarrumestari). During the 2021 season, 16 people worked as brakemasters, including one female.

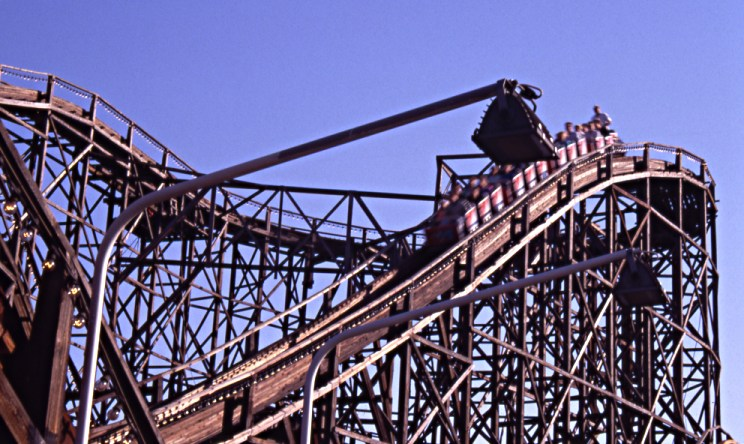
Vuoristorata's train going down a hill, with the brakeman standing at the back.

Over the decades, Vuoristorata has been carefully maintained. To ensure safety, all the wooden parts have been regularly replaced; by 2015, each part had been replaced at least five times. All that remains of the original structure from the 1950s are the oak-framed wooden cars. In order to preserve the original layout, subsequent restorations have been carried out carefully; although all the wooden parts are replacements, they are consistent with the original design and character of the track.

Since 2001, Vuoristorata has been among the few roller coasters in the world to have been awarded the ACE Coaster Classic status by the American Coaster Enthusiasts. As of 2022, only nine tracks in Europe and 30 in the world meet the requirements. The track must be of wooden construction, the safety bar must be one-piece and the same for both riders and lockable in only one position, there must be no cup seats or dividers between riders intended to prevent sliding, there must be no headrests on the majority of seats that would obstruct the view of upcoming drops and thrills, and no assigned seating; riders must be free to choose where they sit.
