= Tulireki =

Roller coaster in Linnanmäki, Helsinki, Finland

- Tulireki roller coaster at Linnanmäki.

Linnanmäki
- Location: Linnanmäki
- Coordinates: 60°11′17″N 24°56′17″E
- Status: Operating
- Opening date: April 29, 2004

General statistics
- Type: Steel
- Manufacturer: Mack Rides
- Model: e-Motion Coaster
- Lift/launch system: Chain lift hill
- Height: 54.2 ft (16.5 m)
- Length: 1,102.4 ft (336.0 m)
- Speed: 36 mph (58 km/h)
- Inversions: 0
- G-force: 3.5
- Tulireki at RCDB

Video

Tulireki (lit. 'Fire Sleigh') is a roller coaster located at Linnanmäki in Helsinki, Finland. It is Kalevala featured, just like Salama.
