= Pikajuna =

Roller coaster at Linnanmäki, Helsinki, Finland

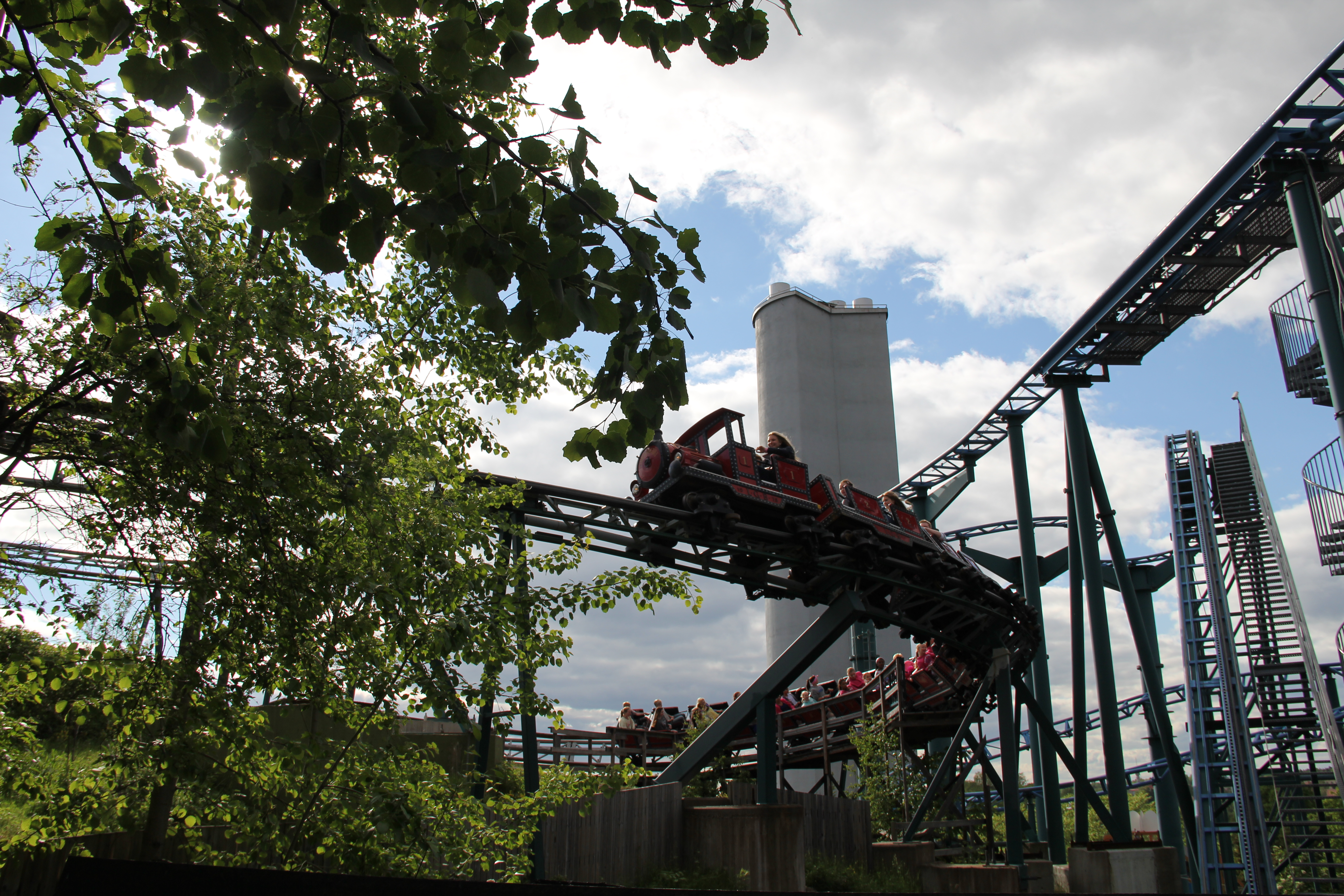

Linnanmäki
- Location: Linnanmäki
- Coordinates: 60°11′15″N 024°56′17″E
- Status: Operating
- Opening date: 1990

General statistics
- Type: Steel
- Manufacturer: Mack Rides
- Model: Powered Coaster
- Height: 7.0 m (23.0 ft)
- Length: 293.0 m (961.3 ft)
- Speed: 37 km/h (23 mph)
- Inversions: 0
- Duration: 1:35
- Pikajuna at RCDB

Pikajuna (lit. 'Express') is a powered roller coaster located at Linnanmäki in Helsinki, Finland. It was known as City Express during 1990–2003 seasons, but when Linnanmäki started a new naming policy in 2004, using only Finnish names for its rides, the ride was renamed Pikajuna. Pikajuna means "Express Train" in Finnish.
