= Vonkaputous =

Water roller coaster at Linnanmäki in Helsinki, Finland

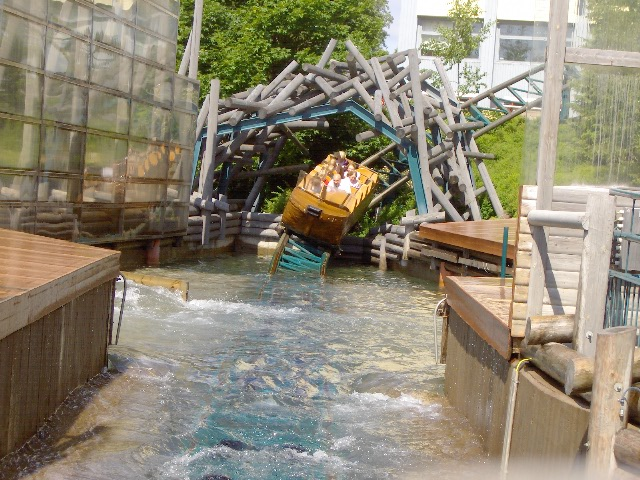
- Vonkaputous water coaster at Linnanmäki.

Linnanmäki
- Location: Linnanmäki
- Coordinates: 60°11′18″N 24°56′17″E
- Status: Removed
- Opening date: 12 May 2001
- Closing date: 22 October 2017
- Cost: 22,000,000 FIM (€4,600,000; inflation-adjusted)
- Replaced by: Taiga

General statistics
- Type: Steel
- Manufacturer: Premier Rides
- Designer: Werner Stengel
- Model: Liquid Coaster
- Height: 79 ft (24 m)
- Length: 1,082.8 ft (330.0 m)
- Speed: 37.3 mph (60.0 km/h)
- Inversions: 0
- Duration: 1:00
- G-force: 2.5
- Vonkaputous at RCDB

Vonkaputous was a water roller coaster located at Linnanmäki in Helsinki, Finland.

== Ride experience ==
In Vonkaputous, visitors rode in a roller coaster car appearing as a boat, seating 10 passengers in 5 rows. After leaving the station, the car descended into a 90 degree turn leading to the lift hill. After the lift hill, the right-hand first drop led through a tunnel with mist effect. After the left-hand second drop, the car splashed to the water. After the splash, the car slowly passed to the station through an S-turn.

== History ==
Vonkaputous was built by Premier Rides. It was situated in a mostly empty section of the amusement park, and only a small track ride called Hokkus Pokkus was relocated to make space for the new ride. Vonkaputous was built during the off-season 2000–2001 and opened on 12 May 2001, two weeks behind schedule. Total cost of the project was 22 million marks, which made Vonkaputous the most expensive ride investment in Linnanmäki's history at that time. Vonkaputous is the first Premier Rides roller coaster installed in Europe, and the second and last Liquid Coaster model to be built, alongside now-defunct Buzzsaw Falls at Silver Dollar City. Due to limited space, Vonkaputous did not have a free-floating river section but traveled on the track during the whole ride.

Like its counterpart in the US, Vonkaputous was repeatedly plagued with technical difficulties during its lifetime. For many years it was possible to operate the ride with only one car, despite having originally designed to have up to three cars running at the same time. This was mainly because of system glitches and the ride's interference-sensitive infrared sensors. Since it was not possible to operate Vonkaputous without water, there were two 160 kW pumps constantly circulating water when the ride was operating. Therefore the operational costs were high compared to the ride's capacity and the need for maintenance. Also, since Liquid Coaster is a discontinued model, limited spare part accessibility induced further problems.

In its last two seasons, the ride suffered from excessive downtime, and during its last season, Vonkaputous operated for only two months out of six months long season. Due to a technical trouble, Vonkaputous closed on 10 August 2017 and remained standing but not operating for the rest of the season. The roller coaster and all of the related structures were demolished during the off-season 2017–2018.

Amongst other areas of the park, the property where Vonkaputous stood was used for Intamin launch coaster called Taiga, which opened in 2019.
