= Linnunrata =

Roller coaster at Linnanmäki in Helsinki, Finland

- Previously known as Linnunrata eXtra (2015-2025) Linnunrata (2004–2015) and Space Express (2000–2003)
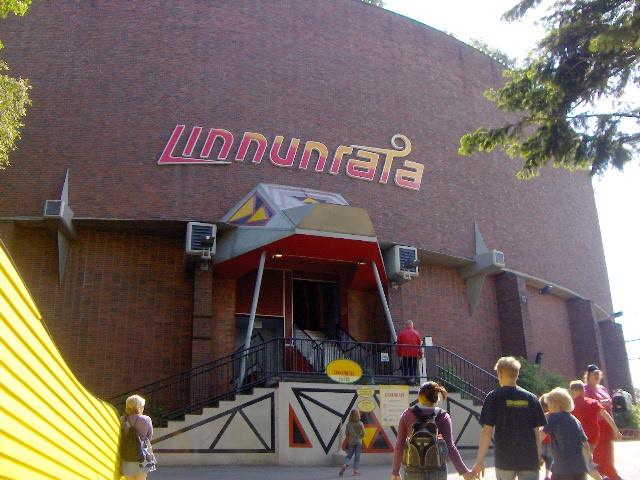
- Entrance to the Linnunrata roller coaster

Linnanmäki
- Location: Linnanmäki
- Coordinates: 60°11′16″N 24°56′24″E
- Status: Operating
- Opening date: 1 May 2000
- Replaced: Indiana's Adventure (formerly Safari)

General statistics
- Type: Steel – Enclosed
- Manufacturer: Zierer
- Designer: Werner Stengel
- Model: Force – Custom
- Height: 7 m (23 ft)
- Length: 300 m (980 ft)
- Speed: 40 km/h (25 mph)
- Inversions: 0
- Duration: 1:00
- Capacity: 800 riders per hour
- Height restriction: 120–195 cm (3 ft 11 in – 6 ft 5 in)
- Linnunrata at RCDB

Linnunrata (lit. 'Milky Way'; previously Linnunrata eXtra and Space Express) is an indoor roller coaster located at Linnanmäki in Helsinki, Finland. Originally in 2000–2003 it was known as Space Express, but when Linnanmäki started a new naming policy in 2004, using only Finnish names for its rides, the ride was renamed Linnunrata.

When inside, to get to the roller coaster, riders first walk through some space station-style corridors. The actual ride has an outer space style, starting by flashing bright LED lights. The track itself is lined with space-themed miniature models. The ride was renewed for the 2016 season, with the addition of virtual reality headsets that riders can wear on board if they wish. The name of the ride was changed to Linnunrata eXtra.

In 2018, two new options were added in addition to the original space adventure: Kauhujen taival (the Flight of Horrors) and Liitolentomatka (the Gliding Flight). When riders step on the ride, once they put on the headsets, they can choose the video they want.

The roller coaster is built inside the water reservoir of a former water tower, and for the time being is the only indoor roller coaster ride in Finland. The design and production was by APW Group.
