= Linnanmäki =

Amusement park in Helsinki, Finland

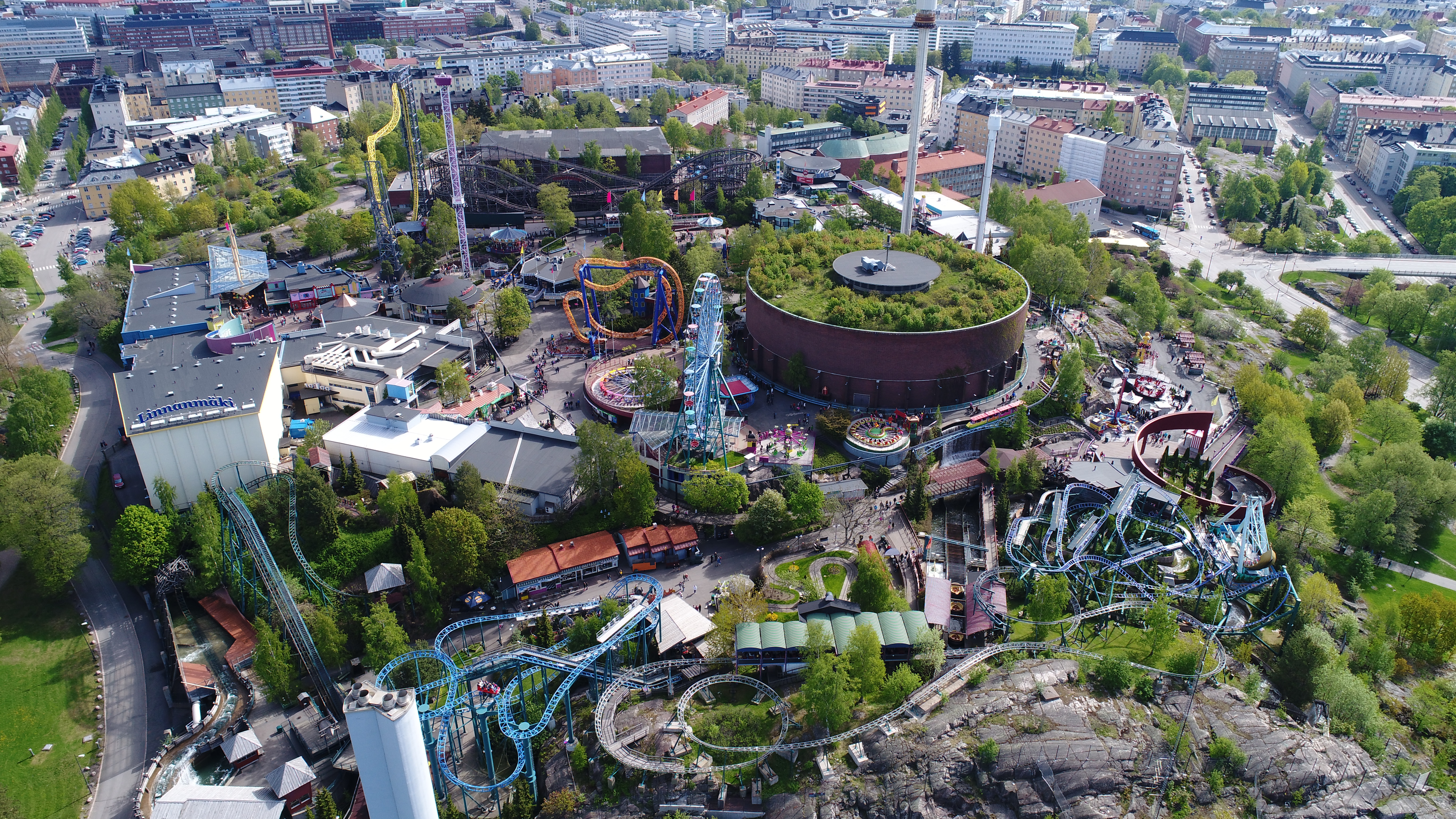
- Aerial view of Linnanmäki in 2017
- Interactive map of Linnanmäki
- Location: Helsinki, Finland
- Coordinates: 60°11′18″N 024°56′25″E
- Status: Operating
- Opened: 27 May 1950; 76 years ago
- Owner: Children's Day Foundation
- General manager: Satu Järvelä (2024–present)
- Operating season: April to October
- Attendance: approx. 1 million
- Area: 7.5 hectares (19 acres)

Attractions
- Total: 42 (as of 2026)
- Roller coasters: 8
- Water rides: 1
- Website: linnanmaki.fi

Linnanmäki (Swedish: Borgbacken, colloquially Lintsi, lit. 'Hill Of The Castle') is an amusement park in Helsinki, Finland. It was opened on 27 May 1950 and is owned by the non-profit Children's Day Foundation (Finnish: Lasten Päivän Säätiö, Swedish: Stiftelsen Barnens Dag), which operates the park to raise funds for Finnish child welfare work. In 2023, the foundation donated €4.5 million, and so far has donated a total of over €130 million to this cause.

Linnanmäki is the oldest and most popular amusement park in Finland. It has many rides of different types and sizes, and of the all Nordic amusement parks, Linnanmäki has the most rides in relation to the number of visitors. It also has other attractions, including arcades, games, kiosks, restaurants and an outdoor stage on which different performers appear in the summer. The park is open from spring to autumn; the opening day is around May Day and the closing is in the third week of October. Linnanmäki is visited by about a million guests annually. In August 2006, Linnanmäki received its fifty-millionth visitor. In terms of wristband prices, Linnanmäki is currently the most expensive amusement park of Finland.

== History ==
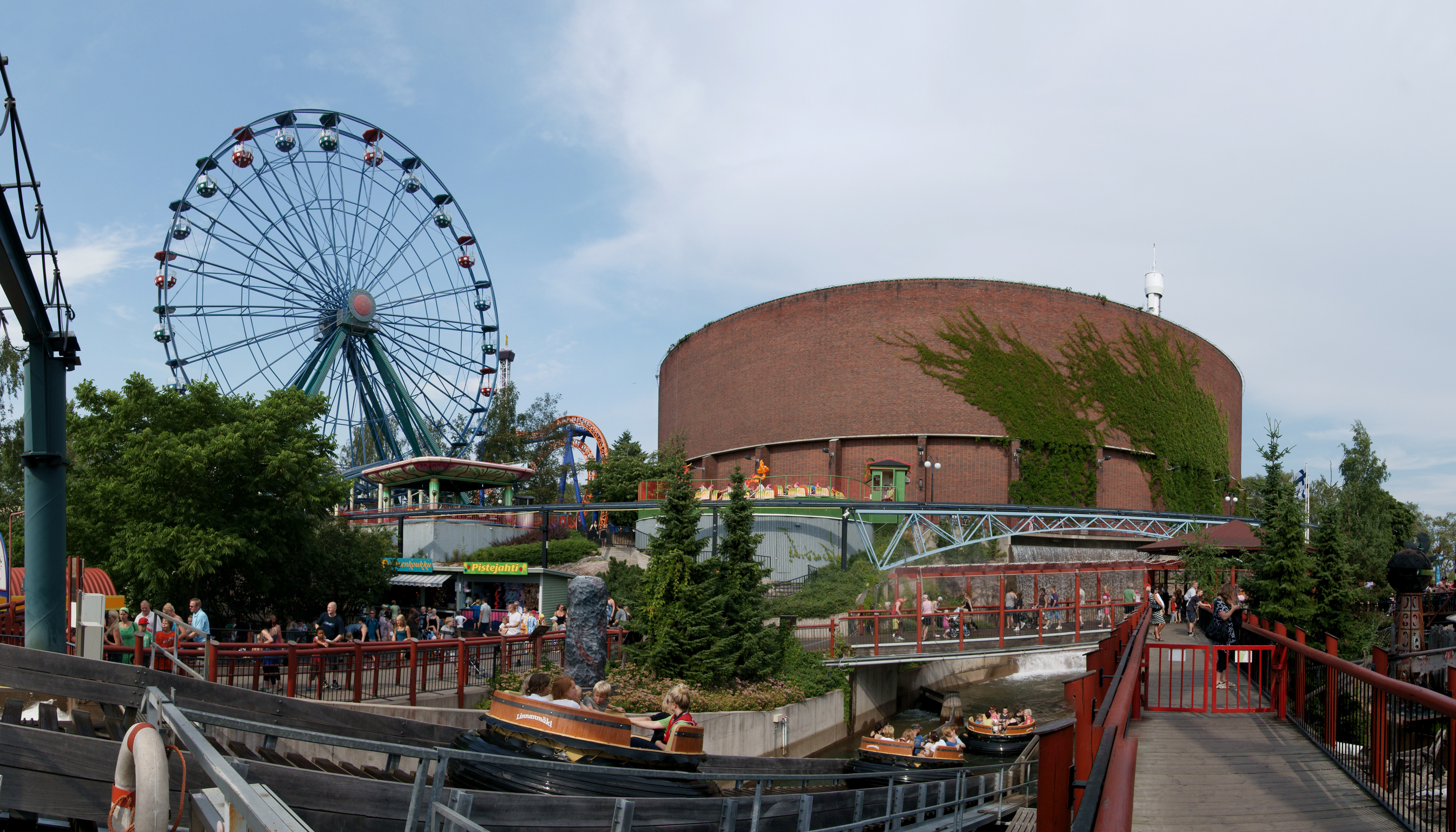
One of the former water towers houses an indoor roller coaster, Linnunrata eXtra.

In 1950, six Finnish child welfare organisations leased an area in the middle of a recreational zone in Helsinki, consisting of two parks, to establish an amusement park. Initially, the lease was granted for three years. However, in 1953, the city extended the lease and allocated 5.37 hectares (13.3 acres) for the park. Following the city plan approved in 1956, the amusement park was further expanded to over 7.2 ha (18 acres). In 1957, the welfare organisations formed the non-profit Children's Day Foundation, which continues to manage and develop the amusement park. Today, the site covers 7.5 hectares (19 acres).

Linnanmäki, as the amusement park is known, is built on a hill and takes its name from Vesilinnanmäki (lit. 'Water Castle Hill'), a name given by locals in the early 20th century due to the presence of two water towers built in 1876 and 1938, respectively. Although the towers were disconnected from the water grid in 2003 and are no longer operational, they are protected by the city's zoning plan and cannot be demolished. There have been plans to utilize the towers year-round in support of the amusement park's activities. The older, angular tower, located near the park's perimeter and the oldest water tower in Helsinki, currently serves as a maintenance and storage facility for the park. The newer, cylindrical tower, which dominates the park and its surroundings, houses an indoor roller coaster called Linnunrata.

== Accidents ==
Since its opening in 1950, Linnanmäki has had two fatalities related to ride accidents, both involving the Vuoristorata roller coaster and resulting from rider negligence. The first incident occurred in 1953 when the roller coaster's brakeman, who had finished his shift, sat in the front row for the final ride of the evening. He did not secure the safety bar, fell off, and was struck by the train. In 1985, a young male guest sitting in the front row managed to open the safety bar and stood up to wave to his friends. He then fell in front of the train and was run over.

== The park ==
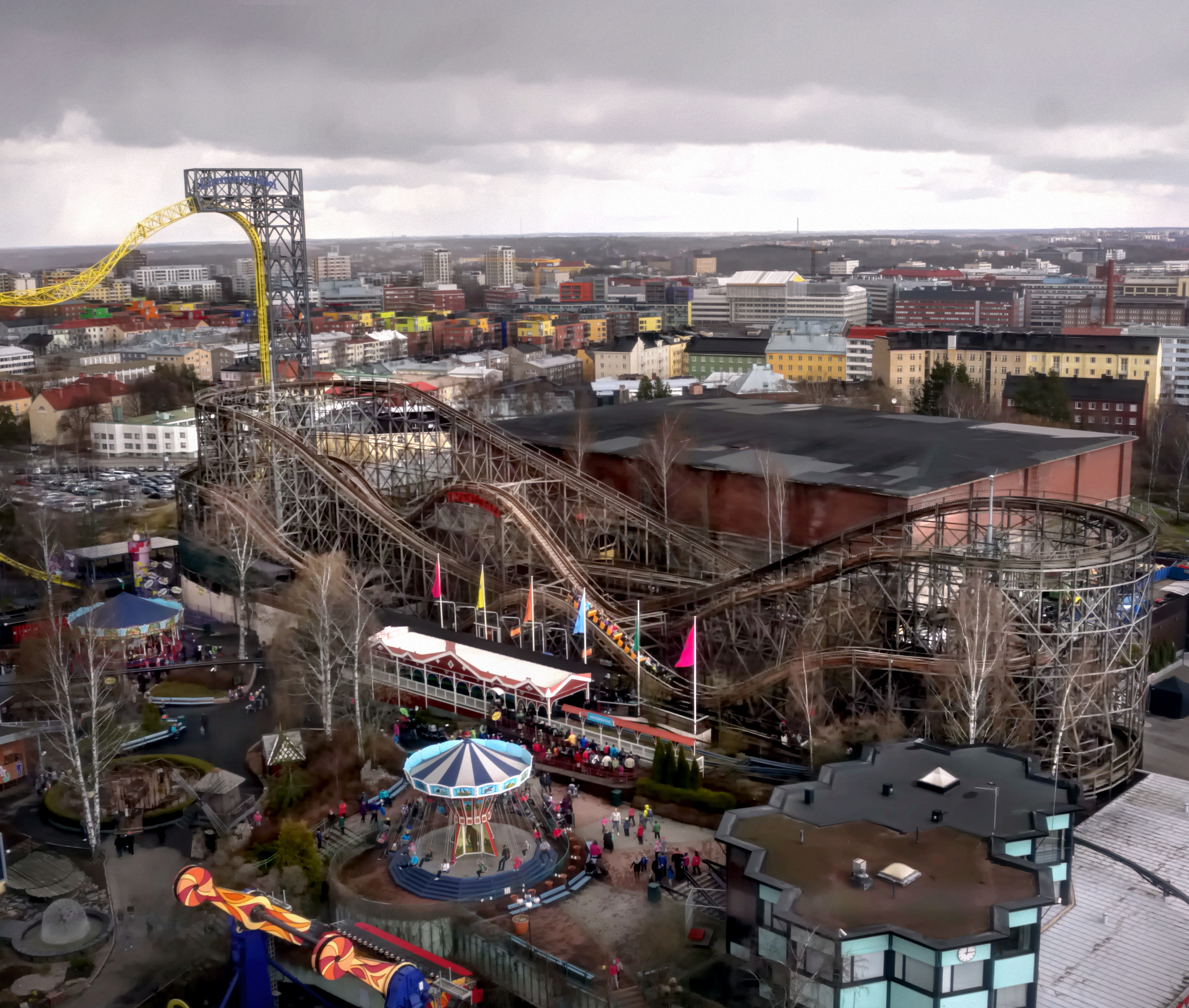
Vuoristorata, the main roller coaster, has been the most popular ride at Linnanmäki every year since its opening on 13 July 1951.

Linnanmäki is situated in the Alppila sub-district of Alppiharju, 2.5 km (1.6 mi) north of Helsinki's city centre, the capital of Finland. The park is located on a hill that offers a nice view of the city. The park has no distinct theming and is relatively compact and densely packed, with rides and attractions in close proximity to each other.

Beyond the amusement rides and attractions, the park is home to the Peacock Theatre (also spelt Peacock Theater), a historic venue built in 1950, renowned for its musical productions.

Visitors can also explore the Sea Life aquarium, the only Sea Life centre in the Nordic countries, which opened in 2002.

Linnanmäki operates from April to October, though the theatre and aquarium are open year-round. From 1996 to 2005, the park also housed Linnanmäen museo, a museum facility near the main entrance that hosted several exhibitions annually.

The park is easily accessible from the city centre by tram lines 3, 8, and 9, as well as bus line 23.

== Rides and attractions ==
Linnanmäki currently features 42 rides along with various non-ride attractions. The park's most iconic ride is Vuoristorata, a wooden roller coaster that opened in 1951. It is the most recognisable symbol of the park and was one of the first permanent rides constructed there. Technically, the oldest ride at Linnanmäki is Karuselli, a carousel built in Germany in 1896, which has been at Linnanmäki since 1954.

Linnanmäki has eight roller coasters, complemented by other major attractions, including three tower rides, a Ferris wheel, a river rapids ride, and several spinning rides. Linnanmäki also offers a variety of family-friendly and kiddie rides.

Formerly, admission to the park was free, but since March 2025, a €5 fee is charged for entry to the area (though admission is free for children under 3). Most rides require either a ride ticket or the more popular wristband. The wristband grants unlimited access to all rides for the entire day, subject to height restrictions. As of 2013, the wristband price is the same for all customers, regardless of age or height. Additionally, a season pass is available, providing customers with a personal wristband for each day of the season. Separate priority boarding tickets are also offered for Taiga and Swingi, allowing riders to skip the line through a dedicated entrance.

Linnanmäki hosts various events and festivals throughout the year, such as the popular iik!week horror festival and the traditional Valokarnevaali ("Carnival of Light"). These events are held in the autumn and have been organized since 2016 and 2006, respectively. Until 2019, the season's last day featured a grand fireworks display, but this has not been organized since 2020 due to concerns over responsibility.

=== Mermaid hall ===
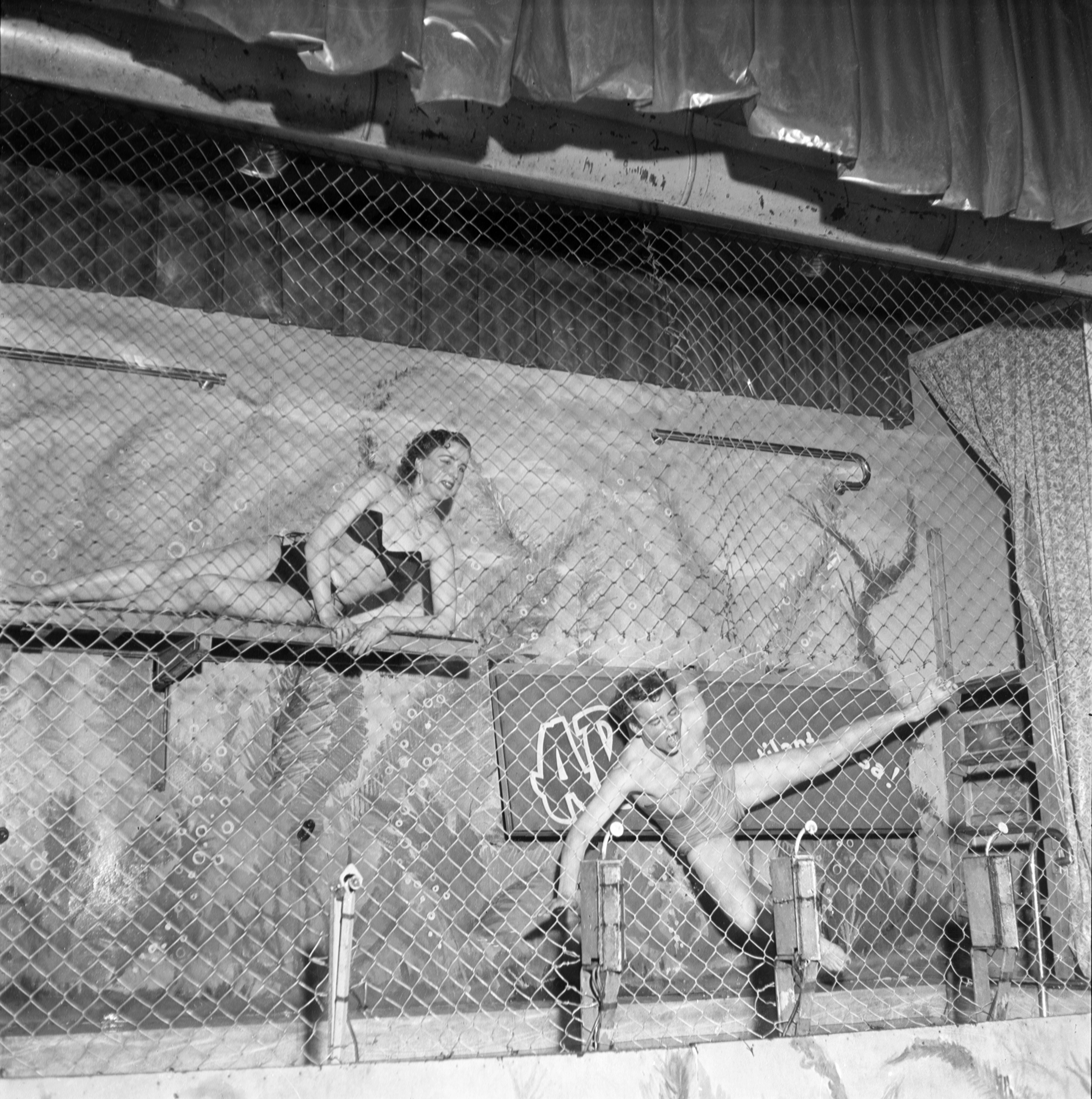
Linnanmäki mermaid hall. A male journalist, posing as a mermaid, is being dropped during a photoshoot in 1955.

Vedenneitohalli (English: Mermaid hall) was a popular dunk tank attraction at Linnanmäki from 1951 to 1980. Operated by Finnish fairground operator Lauri Seiterä and his wife Johanna, the attraction featured young female performers dressed in swimsuits, referred to as mermaids. The performers would lie on a platform above a water tank, shielded by a net. For a fee, visitors attempted to hit a target on a pole with a ball. If successful, the target's release mechanism would trigger, causing the performer to fall into the water.

In the 1970s, men were also included as performers after a women's organisation highlighted the issue of gender equality. In 1978, Naisasialiitto Unioni, a Finnish women's organisation, sent a letter to Linnanmäki's management, criticizing the attraction as demeaning to women. Consequently, the attraction was closed in 1980.

=== Current rides ===
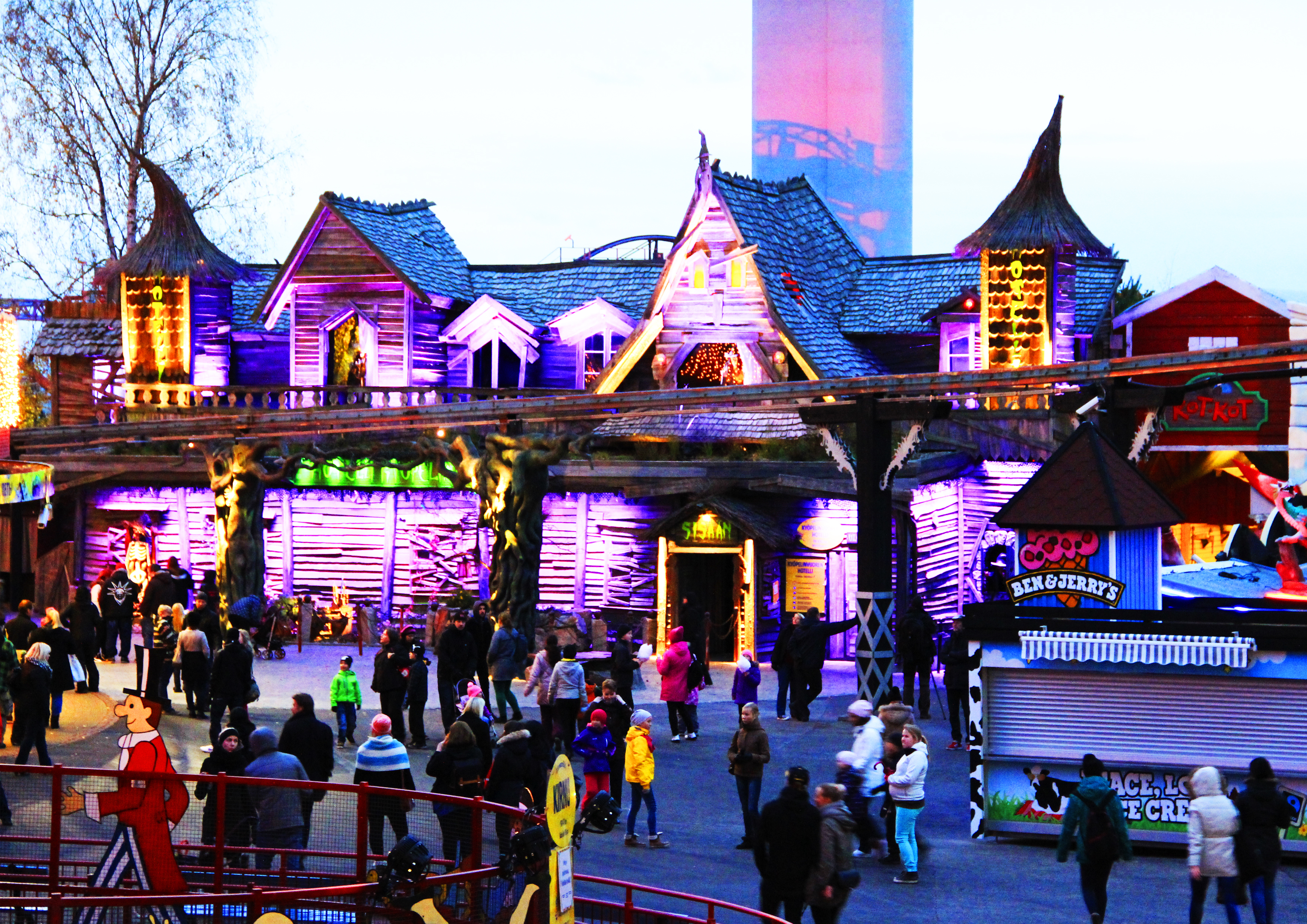
Kyöpelinvuoren hotelli, a dark ride at Linnanmäki.

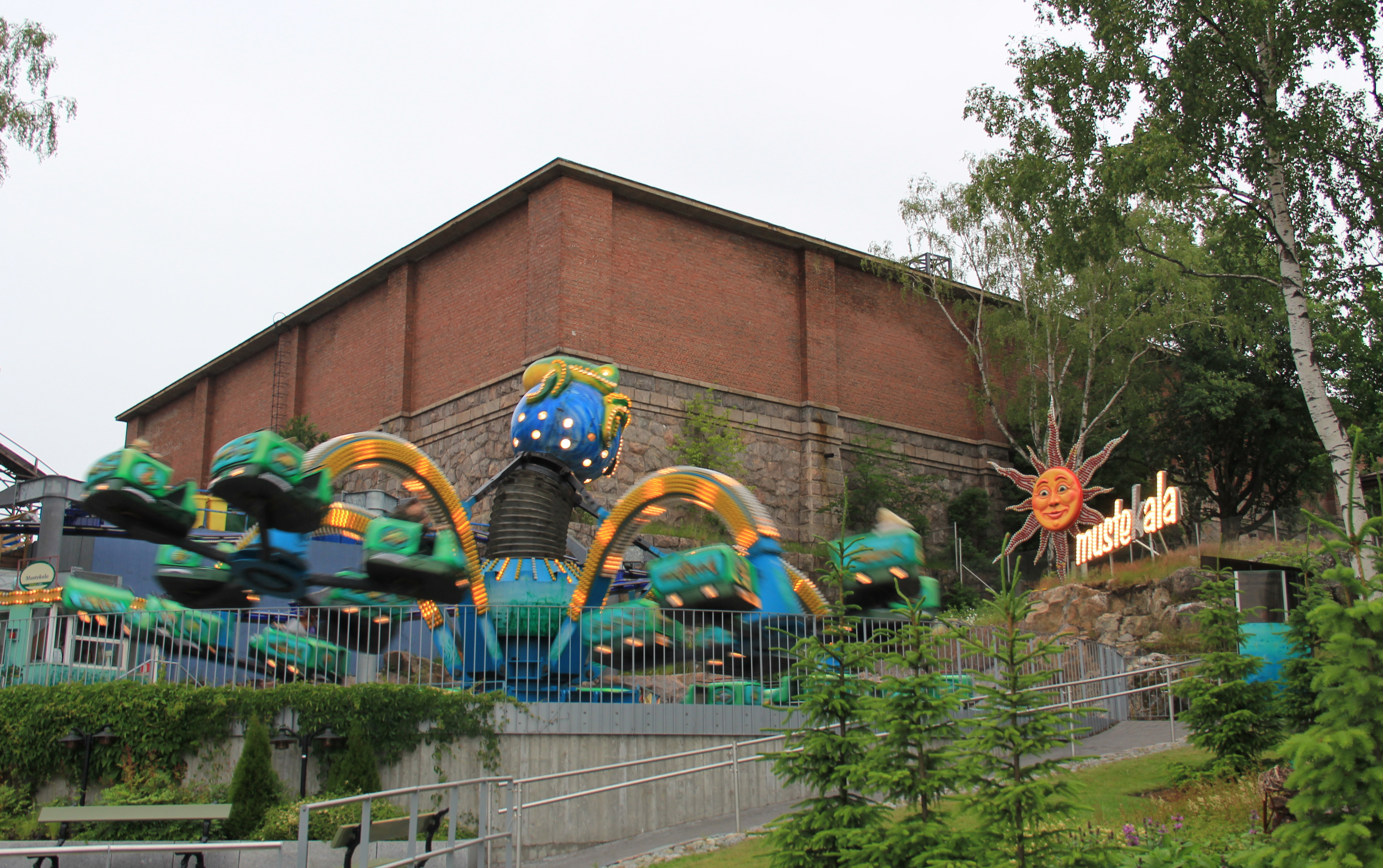
The older water tower, built in 1876, houses maintenance and storage facilities. Front: Mustekala ride (Polyp, Octopus)

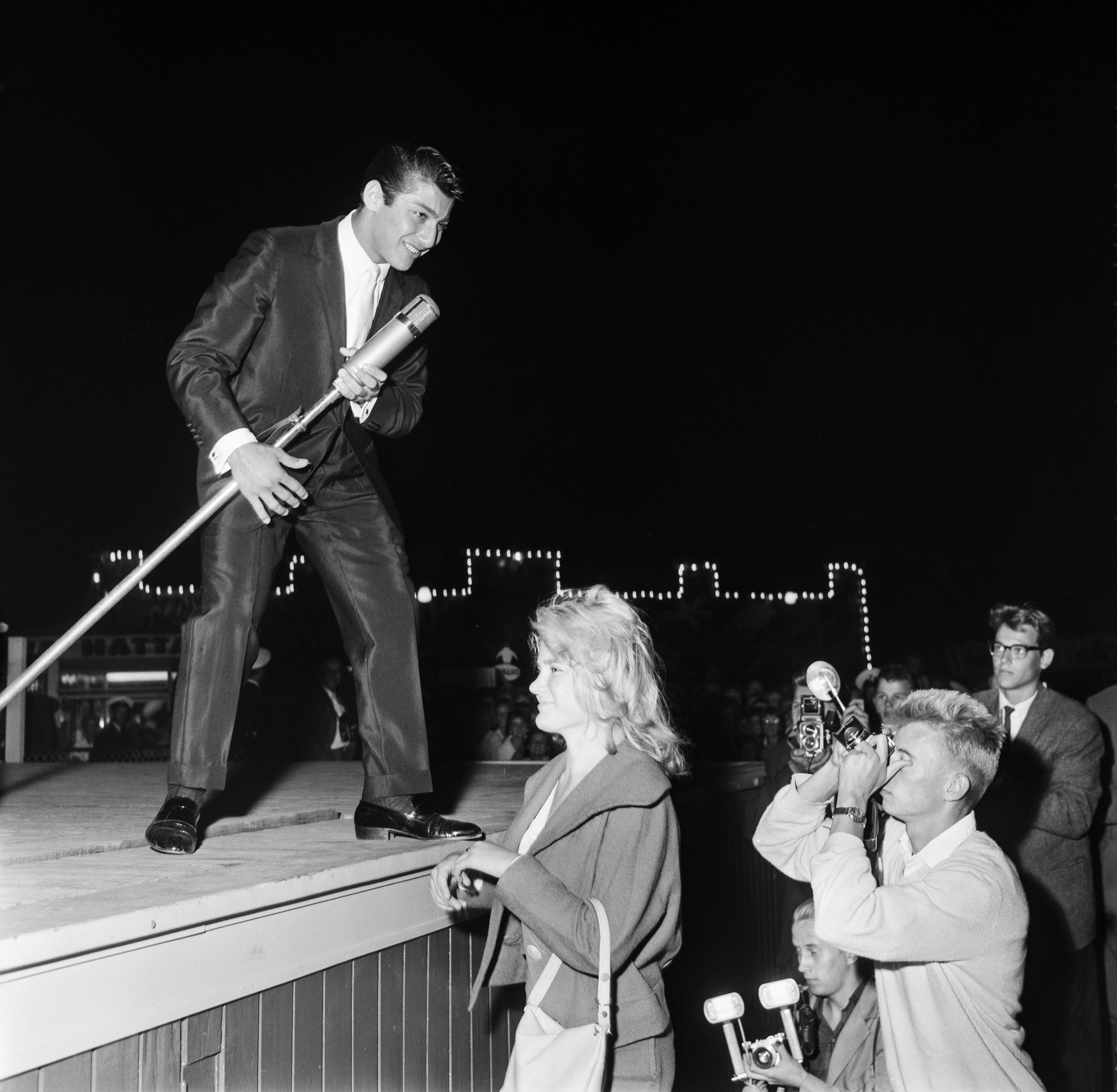
Paul Anka performing on the open air stage at Linnanmäki, 1959.

==== Roller coasters ====
Name	Manufacturer / Model	Type	Opened	Notes / Info
Kirnu	Intamin / ZacSpin	Steel roller coaster, 4th dimension	2007	First compact 4D roller coaster, first 4D roller coaster in Europe.
Linnunrata	Zierer / Force	Steel roller coaster, enclosed	2000	Custom coaster layout with theme design and construction by APW Group in the UK. Built inside a former water tower. Previously known as Space Express (2000–2003). During seasons 2016–2025, optional virtual reality headsets were added to enhance the experience, and the attraction was renamed Linnunrata eXtra. The former name was restored for the 2026 season.
Pikajuna	Mack Rides / Powered Coaster	Powered roller coaster	1990	Custom layout, train engine theme. Previously known as City Express (1990–2003).
Salama	Maurer Söhne / Xtended SC 3000	Steel roller coaster, spinning cars	2008	Custom layout, built above existing rapids ride. Theming by Farmer Attractions Development, UK.
Taiga	Intamin / LSM launched Coaster	Steel roller coaster, launched	2019	Launched custom roller coaster opened for the 2019 season. Taiga is the tallest (52 m, 171 ft), fastest (106 km/h, 66 mph) and longest (1,104 m, 3,622 ft) roller coaster in Finland. Taiga has two LSM launches, a top hat element and four inversions. The track is located mostly in the area where Vonkaputous once stood, but has elements above Pikajuna and Tulireki too. The station and queue building are constructed on the former site of Vekkula and Kotkot.
Tulireki	Mack Rides / e-Motion Coaster	Steel roller coaster	2004	First and only operating e-Motion Coaster model. The gimmick of the ride are cars mounted on a suspension allowing them to rock back and forth and side to side.
Ukko	Maurer Söhne / SkyLoop XT 150	Steel roller coaster	2011	Currently the second tallest and fastest roller coaster in Finland.
Vuoristorata	Linnanmäki	Wooden roller coaster, scenic railway	1951	Designed by Valdemar Lebech, one of seven operating roller coasters to feature brakemen. Vuoristorata has received Coaster Classic award (2001) and Roller Coaster Landmark designation (2025) from American Coaster Enthusiasts.

==== Major rides ====
Name	Manufacturer / Model	Opened	Notes / Info
Autorata	Gebrüder Ihle Bruschal / Autoskooter ES-GP	1981 (renewed 2007)	Bumper cars. Originally the ride had its own canopy, but it is now located beneath the ferris wheel, where it moved in 2007. This is the third bumper car ride at Linnanmäki.
Hurjakuru	Intamin / Rapids Ride	1998	Course is 370 metres (1,210 ft) long, features a 50 metres (160 ft) long tunnel and two water falls.
Kahvikuppikaruselli	Mack Rides / Tea Cups	2002	Tea cups carousel.
Kehrä	Emiliana Luna Park / Enterprise	2009	Enterprise ride made in Italy. The ride was closed from June 2023 to July 2024, when the ride was waiting for a spare part.
Kingi	Moser Rides / Mach Tower	2014	75 metres (246 ft) tall freefall tower, tallest amusement attraction in Finland.
Magia	Technical Park / Heavy Rotation	2017	Spinning ride with rising and rotating arm.
Maisemajuna	Gebrüder Ihle Bruschal / Monorail	1979	Monorail train circulating the park. Track length is 490 metres (1,610 ft). This is one of two operating Ihle Monorails and the only one that completes a full circuit. Previously known as Monorail (1979–2003).
Mustekala	Schwarzkopf / Monster III	1985	Octopus ride, moved to current location in 2010. Previously known as Polyp (1985–2003).
Panoraama	Intamin / Gyro Tower	1987	53 metres (174 ft) tall rotating observation tower. Previously known as Panorama (1987–2003). The gondola was refurbished for the 2020 season.
Raketti	S&S Power / Space Shot	1999	60 metres (200 ft) tall compressed air powered launch tower. Previously known as Space Shot (1999–2003).
Rinkeli	Technical Park / Ferris Wheel 32	2006	Ferris wheel, 32 metres (105 ft) in diameter, replaced old ferris wheel from 1964.
Swingi	Intamin / Gyro Swing	2024	Frisbee type pendulum ride. The ride is 24 metres (79 ft) high with a maximum swing height of 42 metres (138 ft), and it has a 40 passenger gondola. Replaced Kieputin (Top Spin).
Viikinkilaiva	Zierer / Viking	1981	Swinging ship ride, moved to current location in 2002. Previously known as Viking (1981–2003).

==== Family rides ====
Name	Manufacturer / Model	Opened	Notes / Info
Hepparata	Gebrüder Ihle Bruschal / Derby Reitparcours	1982	Galloping horse ride, moved to current location in 1998. Also known as Ratsastusrata (1982–1997).
HipHop	Moser Rides / Spring Ride 5+5	2000	Family tower ride, moved to current location in 2004.
Huristin	Zamperla / Crazy Bus	2025	Family swinging ride.
Hypytin	Zamperla / Sky Tower	2009	Family tower ride.
Karuselli		1954	Carousel originally built in Germany in 1896.
Keikutin	Zamperla / Rockin' Tug	2025	Flat tugboat ride.
Ketjukaruselli		1977	Swing carousel, moved to current location in 1998.
Kyöpelinvuoren hotelli	Gosetto / Dark Ride	2013	Dark ride, theming designed and produced by Farmer Attractions Development in the UK. Kyöpelivuoren hotelli replaced old Kummitusjuna (ghost train) attraction, and the facade was the only thing that was reused for the new attraction.
Lohikäärme	Zierer / Dragon	1998	Oriental themed carousel. Previously known as Dragon (1998–2003). Relocated from Planet FunFun where the ride operated 1991–1995.
Pellen talo	Gosetto / Fun House	2018	Transportable funhouse mounted on a 16-metre (52 ft) semitrailer. This temporary attraction is installed at the park until new Vekkula funhouse is built. After that the attraction is moved into a Finnish traveling funfair.
Poppis	Gosetto / Party Dance	2016	Carousel with joysticks to rotate the gondolas.
Propelli	Zamperla / Magic Bikes	2016	Carousel with gondolas that can be elevated by pedaling. One gondola is designed to be accessible by a wheelchair, and the lifting is operated using a hand crank.
Taikasirkus	WGH / Suspended Monorail	2005	Circus-themed dark ride. Produced by Rex Studios in the UK. It replaced Around the World, produced by APW Group in 1997, and uses the same track and cars.

==== Kiddie rides ====
Name	Manufacturer / Model	Opened	Notes / Info
Helikopteri	BN Performance Rides / Elitoys	2006	Helicopter themed tower ride.
Muksupuksu	Zamperla / Rio Grande	1967 (renewed 1997, 2007)	Kiddie train ride circulating the water tower on 215 metres (705 ft) long track. Current Zamperla train installed in 1997. Station renewed in 2007. Original track by Paul Scwingel from 1967. Previously known as Pienoisrautatie (1967–2003).
Pienoiskaruselli	Claudio Sartori	1966	Small carousel with automotive theme.
Pilotti	Technical Park / Baby Aviator	2010	Kiddie airplane ride.
Rekkaralli	Zamperla / Convoy	1995 (renewed 2019)	Convoy truck ride. Station and track were renewed and cars were repainted in 2019.
Rumpukaruselli	SBF Rides / Clown Cups	1991	Small carousel with music theme.
Vankkuripyörä	Zamperla / Mini Ferris Wheel	1996	Small ferris wheel with Western theme. Previously known as High Chaparral (1996–2003). Moved to current location in 2011.

==== Attractions ====
Name	Manufacturer	Opened	Notes / Info
Kammokuja	Rex Studios	2003	Walkthrough horror attraction, features 3D elements.
Motelli	Linnanmäki	2021	Walkthrough horror attraction, featuring live actors. Built inside the watertower in a space previously used for storage. Motelli is open only during the Iik!week horror festival in September and the Carnival of Light event in October.

=== Removed rides and attractions ===
Name	Manufacturer / Model	Opened	Closed	Notes / Info
Apollo	Claudio Sartori	1986	1997	Small carousel. Replaced by Pallokaruselli. Relocations: Tykkimäki (1998–2011), Wasalandia (2012–2016).
Around the World	WGH / Suspended Monorail	1997	2004	Dark ride, also known as Nukketalo (2004). Produced by APW Group in the UK. It was replaced by Taikasirkus, which uses the same building and cars.
Autorata		1950	1964	First bumper car ride at the park, also known as Radioautorata. Replaced by the second Autorata (1965). Relocated to Tivoli Seiterä (1965–?).
Autorata	Gebrüder Ihle Bruschal / Autoskooter ES-DL	1965	1980	Second bumper car ride at the park. Relocations: Kalajoki fairground (1982–1984), Tykkimäki (1986–2004). Replaced by the current Autorata.
Bensiiniautorata		1951	1953	Car circuit with gasoline-powered vehicles.
Breakdance	HUSS Maschinenfabrik / Breakdance	1988	2001	Replaced by Mustekala (Polyp), which was relocated to Brakedance's property due to the construction of the Sea Life aquarium and installation of Kahvikuppikaruselli. The ride was sold to a German showman Georg Sonnier.
Calypso	Schwarzkopf / Calypso II	1967	1974	Replaced by Enterprise. Relocations: Särkänniemi (1975–1984), Tykkimäki (1986–present).
Cinema	SimEx-Iwerks	1996	2019	4D virtual reality cinema. SimEx-Iwerks system was installed in 2005, original seats were relocated to Wasalandia (2006–2016). The film changed in every two years. Previously known as Virtuaaliteatteri (1996–2001), Lintsi-Kino (2002–2006) and Kino (2007–2015). Cinema closed for the season 2020 due to COVID-19 restrictions and it remained standing but not operating for the next two seasons. In 2022–2023 the space was used for live action theatre productions; a stage was built in place of the projection screen and speakers, and the signage was changed from Cinema to Pieni näyttämö ("Small Stage").
Cortina Jet	Schwarzkopf / Bayern Kurve	1970	1987	Replaced by Breakdance. Relocated to Tykkimäki (1988–2006). The ride was then bought by Nokkakivi where it was in storage. As of 2013, the ride is owned and operated by a showman Rene Lauwers in Belgium.
Enterprise	Schwarzkopf / Enterprise III	1975	1998	Replaced by Space Shot (Raketti). Relocated to Tykkimäki (1999–2017).
Flying Coaster	Eyerly Aircraft Company / Ski Jump	1969	1969	Replaced by Cortina Jet. This ride was rented from Gröna Lund to operate for one season.
Formularata	Ditta Soli Ernesto / Pista 45x18	1968	1995	Car circuit. Replaced by Virtuaaliteatteri (Kino). Relocated to Rocka al Mare funfair in Tallinn, Estonia (1996–2006).
Helsinki-pyörä	De Boer	1964	2005	Ferris wheel, previously known as Boston-pyörä (1964–1972). The ride was rented from a German funfair for the first two seasons, and the park bought it in late 1965. It was replaced by Rinkeli. Relocated to Tykkimäki (2007–present).
Hully Gully	Bennett / Satellite	1972	1972	Trabant style spinning ride. This ride was rented from Swedish Skoghs Tivoli to operate for one season.
Hully Gully	Claudio Sartori / Hully Gully	1984	1985	Small carousel. Replaced by Apollo. Relocations: Tykkimäki (1986–2008), Nokkakivi (2010–present).
Hurlumhei		1952	1959	Funhouse, the predecessor of Vekkula.
Ipanarata		1971	1989	Kiddie roller coaster, replaced by City Express (Pikajuna). The track was manufactured locally in Helsinki by Hakaniemen Metalli Oy.
Kapteeni Kidin merirosvolaiva		1970	1973	Pirate ship themed walkthrough area featuring a jungle gym.
Katapultti	Schwarzkopf / Katapult	1992	1993	First of five Katapult roller coasters built. This unit was a prototype, originally manufactured in 1980. It had been operating in at least three different locations before arriving at Linnanmäki. The ride operated for two seasons and then it was removed due to continuous technical problems and sold. Replaced by Top Spin (Kieputin).
Kieppi	HUSS Maschinenfabrik / Booster	2003	2016	Replaced by Magia. Kieppi was one of only three HUSS Boosters ever built, and the sole park model. The ride was sold to Löffelhardt, a company which operated it as Ghost Rider in funfairs around Germany. As Kieppi was a park model intended for permanent installation, the ride's base was modified and retrofitted on a semitrailer.
Kieputin	Eyerly Aircraft Company / Roll-O-Plane	1951	1977	Relocated to Särkänniemi, where it was in storage for some time.
Kieputin	HUSS Maschinenfabrik / Top Spin	1994	2022	Previously known as Top Spin (1994–2003). Repainted for the 2009 season. The ride was removed after the 2022 season and most of it was scrapped; some parts of the ride were sold abroad as spare parts. Replaced by Swingi.
Kikatti	Marcel Lutz / Baby Flug	1974	1987	Red Baron ride. The original ride was bought by Särkänniemi in 1974, but since the park did not open until 1975, the ride was rented to Linnanmäki to operate for one season as Mini-Avio. Next season, Linnanmäki bought the similar ride. In 1980, it was renamed Kikatti. After the 1987 season, the ride was sold to Ähtäri Zoo.
Kivikylä		1966	1969	A walkthrough area themed around the Flintstones. The pond in the middle of the area with small rowing boats was spared, and it was in place until Tulireki was built for the 2004 season.
Kotkot	Modern Products / Track Ride	1993	2017	Farmhouse themed kiddie track ride. Moved to its last location in 2001, cars and theming renewed in 2004. Previously known as Hokkus Pokkus (1993–2003).
Kummitusjuna		1950	2012	Ghost train attraction that was present at the park since the beginning. First version was imported from Denmark and owned by Svend Jarlström. In 1959, it was relocated to its most recent location. For 1973 the attraction was thoroughly renewed, new track system by Schwarkopf was installed and theming was painted by Willy Willumsen. During 1973–1977 it was known as Satujuna ("Fable Train"), and featured more family friendly theming. From 1978 onwards, the ghost train theming returned. The facade and theming were renewed for 1986, and the name changed to Kauhulinna ("Horror Castle"). Next facade update followed in 2006, and the name changed back to Kummitusjuna. The attraction was demolished after the 2012 season; only the facade was reused for the new dark ride.
Kuuputin	Manorplan Leisure / Stellar Swings	2003	2024	Small carousel with lunar theme. Replaced by Huristin.
Lasten maailmanpyörä	Claudio Sartori	1979	1995	Kiddie ferris wheel. Replaced by High Chaparral (Vankkuripyörä). Relocated to Nokkakivi (2007–present).
Lasten mustekala	Barbieri / Juvenile	1990	1996	Small carousel. Relocated to Tykkimäki (1997–present).
Loch Ness		1951	1953	Small carousel.
Merirosvolaiva	Modern Products / Junior Pirate Ship	1988	2024	Small swinging ship ride. Previously known as Pirate (1988–2003). Replaced by Keikutin.
Meteoriitti	Modern Products / Major Orbit	1990	1999	Small carousel. Replaced by HipHop. Relocated to Tykkimäki (2004–present).
Miniautot	Claudio Sartori	1978	2017	Kiddie bumper cars, moved to its last location in 2014. Replaced by Pellen talo. The ride was in storage, until it was sold at auction in 2022.
Mustekala	Schwarzkopf / Monster	1979	1984	Octopus ride. The ride was bought from Liseberg, where it operated 1968–1978. The ride was originally built for Expo 67 in Montreal. In 1985 it was replaced by Polyp (Mustekala). The ride was subsequently scrapped.
Naurutalo	Linnanmäki	1967	2002	House of mirrors. Originally located on the ground floor of a restaurant building in the middle of the park. For season 1992, the attraction was moved to the space under the office building. The mirrors are still present at the park, located in the underpass near the last Naurutalo location.
Octopus	Eyerly Aircraft Company / Octopus	1951	1954	Replaced by Suihkio.
Pallokaruselli	Zamperla / Samba Balloon	1997	2015	Replaced by Propelli. Relocated to an unknown foreign amusement park.
Pilvenpyörä	De Boer / Airborne	1962	1984	Paratrooper ride. This unit was a prototype, as Linnanmäki wanted a version of the ride that could be lowered to horizontal position for loading. Replaced by Rainbow (Sateenkaari). Relocated to Tykkimäki (1988–present).
Rotor	Ernst Hoffmeister / Rotor	1952	1959	Rotor ride. Also known as Cyclotrooni.
Round Up	Nijmeegs Lasbedrijf / Round Up	1961	1975	Relocations: Särkänniemi (1977–1985), Tykkimäki (1986–2002), Nokkakivi (2006–present).
Safari / Indiana's Adventure	Christian Hofmann	1983 / 1995	1999	Safari-themed dark ride built in the winter of 1982–1983 in a space of about 630 square metres (6,800 sq ft) cut out of a warehouse under the former water tower, featuring large sideways-moving cars with loudspeakers and mechatronic puppets seen along the track. The track was manufactured by the German animatronics company Christian Hofmann GmbH. The popularity of the ride, which in the early years attracted long queues, waned over the years, and part of the track was redesigned for the 1995 season as Indiana's Adventure, an Indiana Jones-themed dark ride, by APW Group. Soon, however, popularity began to wane again, and in 1999 it faced its final season. In 2000, the ride was replaced by an indoor roller coaster Space Express (since renamed to Linnunrata eXtra). All the animatronics were sold abroad, and the cars were in storage at the park for some time.
Salaisuuksien talo	Sparks Creative	1989	1996	Funhouse featuring audiovisual effects, later known as Ihme ja kumma (1995–1996). It was replaced by Around the World (Nukketalo) in 1997. Partly relocated to Tykkimäki under the name Mysteerio (1997–2015).
Sateenkaari	HUSS Maschinenfabrik / Rainbow	1984	2009	Previously known as Rainbow (1984–2003). The ride was removed after 2009 season and it was in storage for a few years, but it was ultimately scrapped in 2014. The sun face was saved and it is on display at the park.
Sokkelo	Linnanmäki	2007	2011	Glass maze walkthrough, replaced by a gift shop.
Suihkio	Kaspar Klaus / Roto-Jet	1955	1986	Replaced by Mustekala. Relocated to Tykkimäki (1987–2011). Subsequently scrapped.
Sukelluskello HA-1	Budgast	2014	2019	4D virtual reality attraction. Previously known as Haipeli (pre-opening) and Haihyökkäys (2014). The attraction closed for the season 2020 due to COVID-19 restrictions, and it did not open after that. The attraction has since been removed.
Troika	HUSS Maschinenfabrik / Troika	1974	1974	Relocated to Särkänniemi (1975–present). This ride was bought by Särkänniemi in 1974, but since the park did not open until 1975, the ride was rented to Linnanmäki to operate for one season.
Vauhtihirviö	Linnanmäki	1950	1952/57	Tilt-a-whirl ride. There were two identical rides at the park, named Vauhtihirviö 1 (operated 1950–1952) and Vauhtihirviö 2 (1950–1957).
Vedenneitohalli		1951	1980	A dunk tank. A popular attraction where spectators could throw balls at a pole that caused a mermaid performer to fall into water. It was closed in 1980 because it was considered degrading to women.
Vekkula	Linnanmäki	1961	2017	Funhouse, original concept designed and built by Linnanmäki. The last facade designed and built by Rex Studios in 1995. Demolished after 2017 season due to the building to be in a condition beyond repair. Will be replaced by new Vekkula elsewhere in the park.
Vonkaputous	Premier Rides / Liquid Coaster	2001	2017	Second and last water roller coaster built by Premier Rides, first Premier Rides roller coaster built in Europe. Demolished after the 2017 season due to technical unreliability and excessive downtime.

== Gallery of images ==
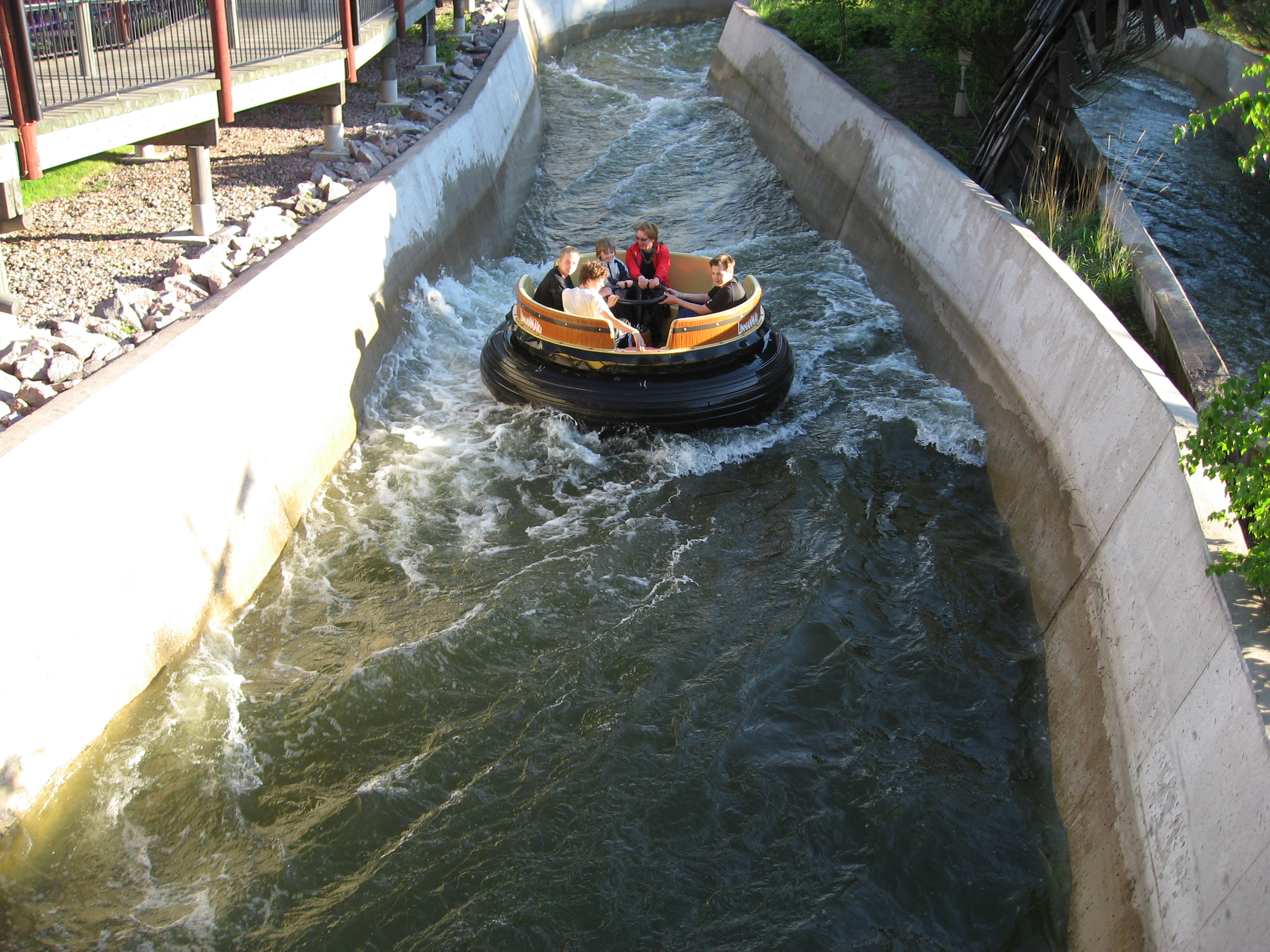
Hurjakuru

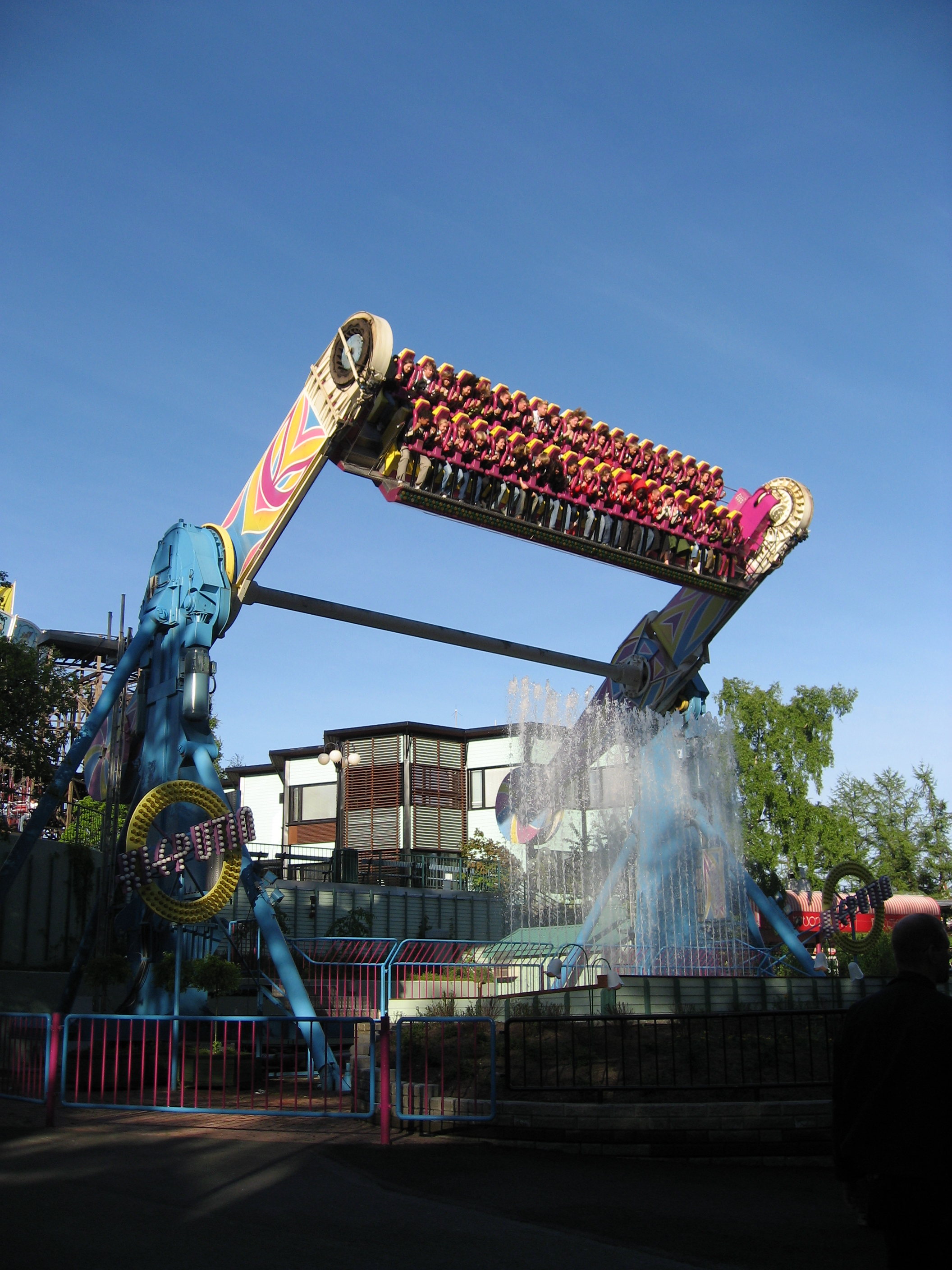
Kieputin

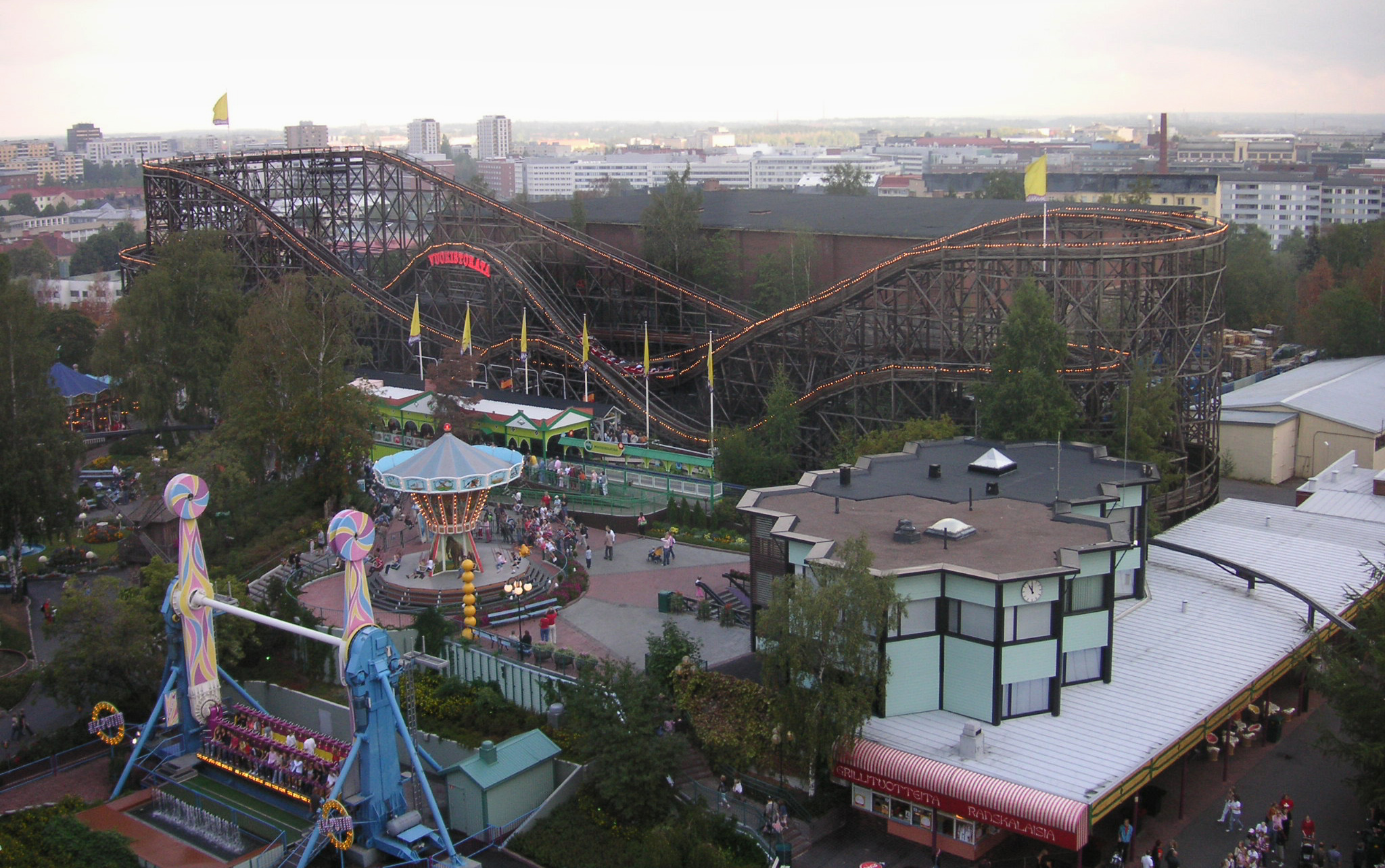
A view from the Panoraama observation tower

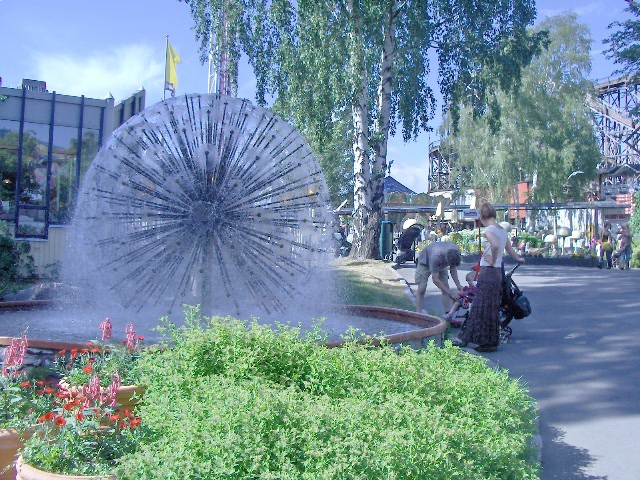
Water fountain

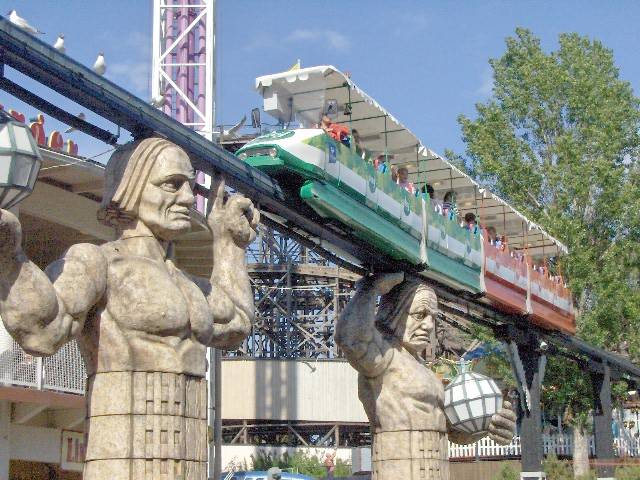
Maisemajuna

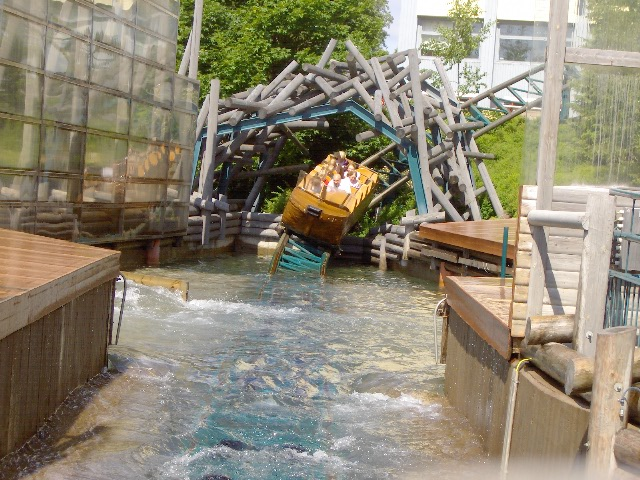
Vonkaputous

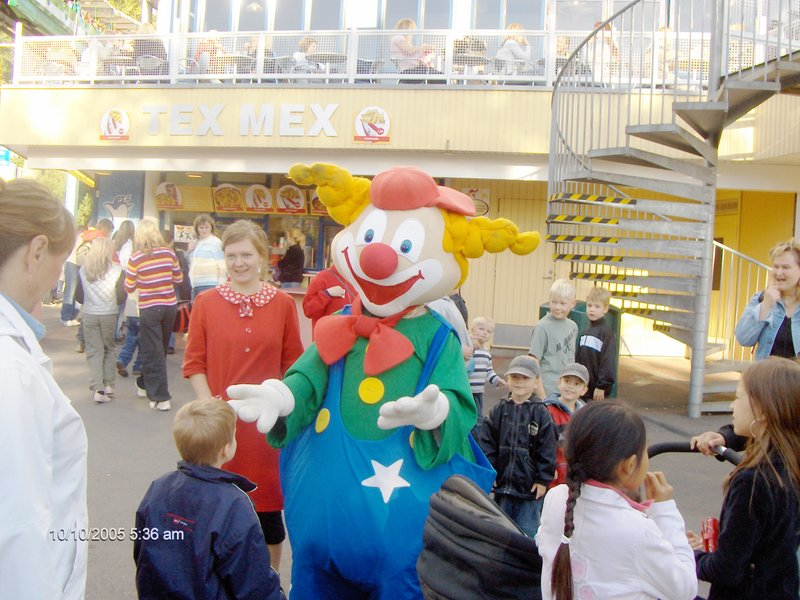
Rolle the Clown, mascot of Linnanmäki

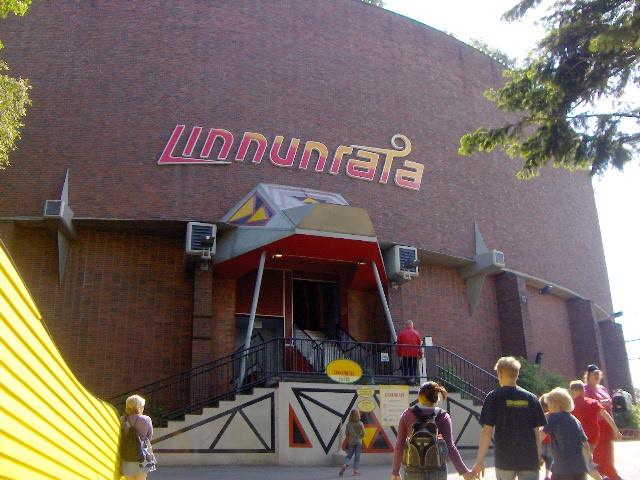
Linnunrata and the water tower
