= Panoraama =

Gyro tower at the Linnanmäki amusement park in Helsinki, Finland

Coordinates: 60°11′15.2″N 24°56′28″E

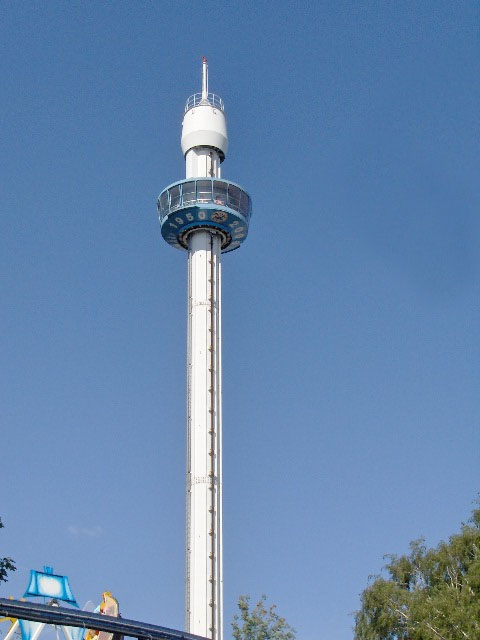

Linnanmäki

Ride statistics
- Manufacturer: Intamin
- Height: 53 m (174 ft)
- Capacity: 400 riders per hour
- Vehicles: 1
- Riders per vehicle: 32
- Website: Official website

Panoraama is a 53 metres (174 ft) tall gyro tower at the Linnanmäki amusement park in Helsinki, Finland. Its observation deck rises about 84 metres (276 ft) above sea level. Panoraama was built in 1987 by the Swiss Intamin and offers capacity for 400 visitors per hour. It was originally known as Panorama, but the name was changed to Panoraama (with an additional letter "a") when Linnanmäki changed the naming policy for its rides and started to use only words that are correct in the Finnish language.

Originally, Linnanmäki was planning a real observation tower, like the considerably taller Näsinneula at the Särkänniemi park in Tampere, but first there were legal issues and later problems with funding. Eventually, Linnanmäki chose to build a tower in the form of a gyro tower ride.

Panoraama is one of the best places to view the city of Helsinki, as the tower is located only about 2 kilometres (1.2 mi) from the centre of the city.

== See also ==
- List of towers
