= Salama (roller coaster) =

Roller coaster in Linnanmäki, Helsinki, Finland

Linnanmäki
- Location: Linnanmäki
- Coordinates: 60°11′14″N 24°56′21″E
- Status: Operating
- Opening date: April 25, 2008

General statistics
- Type: Steel – Spinning
- Manufacturer: Maurer AG
- Lift/launch system: Chain lift hill
- Height: 55.9 ft (17.0 m)
- Length: 1,377.11 ft (419.74 m)
- Speed: 37.3 mph (60.0 km/h)
- Capacity: 800 riders per hour
- Salama at RCDB

Salama (lit. 'Flash' or 'Lightning') is a steel roller coaster located at Linnanmäki in Helsinki, Finland. It was constructed for the 2008 season. It is built on top of Hurjakuru, a river rafting ride.

Salama got its name from Kalevala, the national epic of Finland.
