= Preston & Barbieri =

Italian amusement ride company

- Type: Private
- Industry: Manufacturing
- Predecessor: Preston (1986-1999); Barbieri Rides (1954-1999)
- Founded: Reggio Emilia, Emilia-Romagna (1954)
- Headquarters: Reggio Emilia, Emilia-Romagna, Italy
- Area served: Worldwide
- Products: Amusement rides, roller coasters, water rides
- Website: www.prestonbarbieri.com

Preston & Barbieri is an amusement ride manufacturing company based in Reggio Emilia, Italy. The company was founded in 2000 as a merger of the Preston and Barbieri Rides companies. The company manufactures a wide range of flat rides, water rides and roller coasters out of its 70,000-square-metre (750,000 sq ft) property in Italy.

== History ==
In 1954, Barbieri Rides was formed by the Barbieri brothers. In 1986, Preston was formed by a team of managers from various local companies. As the two companies were both based in Reggio Emilia and manufacturing similar attractions, they merged in 2000 to form Preston & Barbieri.

Preston & Barbieri is based in Emilia-Romagna, an administrative district of Italy. This district has been home to a collection of amusement ride manufacturing firms over the years, many of which have links to the company. S.D.C. was founded by Walter Spaggiari, Mack Duce and Giancarlo Casoli. It manufactured several roller coasters and amusement rides. Among the rides, S.D.C. manufactured bumper cars which were attributed as the creations of Spagiari, Duce, and Barbieri. The company went bankrupt in 1993, with the rights for their rides being bought by other Italian firms C&S, S&MC, and Zamperla. S&MC and L&T Systems were established by former S.D.C. workers, with both companies remaining in the Emilia-Romagna area. L&T Systems ultimately disbanded in 2009, with Preston & Barbieri purchasing the rights to their rides.

Preston & Barbieri has also collaborated directly with other companies to design rides including 3DBA for Splash Battles, and D.P.V. Rides for family roller coasters, among others.

== List of roller coasters ==
As of 2019, Preston & Barbieri has built 27 roller coasters around the world.

Name	Model	Park	Country	Opened	Status	Ref
Cosmic Coaster; Formerly Wacky Worm	Wacky Worm	Worlds of Fun	United States	1993	Removed	
Grand Canyon	Grand Canyon	Bugok Hawaii	South Korea	1994	Removed	
Grand Canyon	Grand Canyon	Luna Park	Lebanon	2002	Removed	
Wacky Worm	Wacky Worm	Sofia Land	Bulgaria	2002	Removed	
Lightning Train	Wacky Worm	Pyeonghwa Land	South Korea	2005	Operating	
Rapidly Train	Grand Canyon	Atayal Resort	Taiwan	2006	Removed	
Aile Treni	Family Coaster Compact	ParkAntep	Turkey	2010	Operating	
Nitro	Double Race	Dennlys Parc	France	2010	Operating	
Master Thai; Formerly Max Adventures Master Thai	Double Race	Mirabilandia	Italy	2011	Operating	
Roller Coaster	Anaconda 58m x 26m Extended	Park Khayyam	Tajikistan	2012	Operating	
Stampbanan	Mini Coaster	Liseberg	Sweden	2013	Operating	
Achtbaan	Family Coaster 30m x 14m	Kinderstad Heerlen	Netherlands	2013	Operating	
Family Coaster	Junior Coaster 33m x 20m	Al Zawraa Land	Iraq	2013	Operating	
Junior Coaster	Junior Coaster 33m x 20m	Jerudong Park Playground	Brunei	2014	Operating	
Der Kleine Zar	Mini Coaster	Hansa Park	Germany	2017	Operating	
Balaurul 7 Capete	Anaconda 2.0	Parcul Lacul Tei	Romania	2017	Operating	
Adventure Greenland	Family Coaster 30m x 14m	Hot Go Sea	China	2017	Operating	
Sea Viper	Anaconda 2.0	Palace Playland	United States	2018	Operating	
Skutan	Family Coaster 30m x 14m	DaftöLand	Sweden	2018	Operating	
Vroom	Unknown	Leolandia	Italy	2018	Operating	
Requin Express	Family Coaster 30m x 14m	Cita-Parc	France	2018	Operating	
Coaster	Family Coaster 30m x 14m	Central Park	Uzbekistan	2018	Operating	
Boule & Bill Déboulent	Spinning Coaster	Parc Spirou Provence	France	2019	Removed	
Pirate's Coaster	Mini Coaster	Parc Du Bocasse	France	2019	Operating	
Draken	Family Coaster 30m x 14m	Energylandia	Poland	2019	Operating	
Red Mountain	Family Coaster 30m x 14m	Fiabilandia	Italy	2019	Operating	
Unknown	Family Coaster 30m x 14m	Sky Ranch	Philippines	2019	Operating	
Rail Blazer	Anaconda 58m x 26m Extended	Bahria Adventura	Pakistan	2019	Operating	
Little Nipper	Mini Coaster	Luna Park Sydney	Australia	2021	Operating	
Unknown	Double Race	Hot Go Dreamworld	China	—N/a	SBNO	

== List of other attractions ==
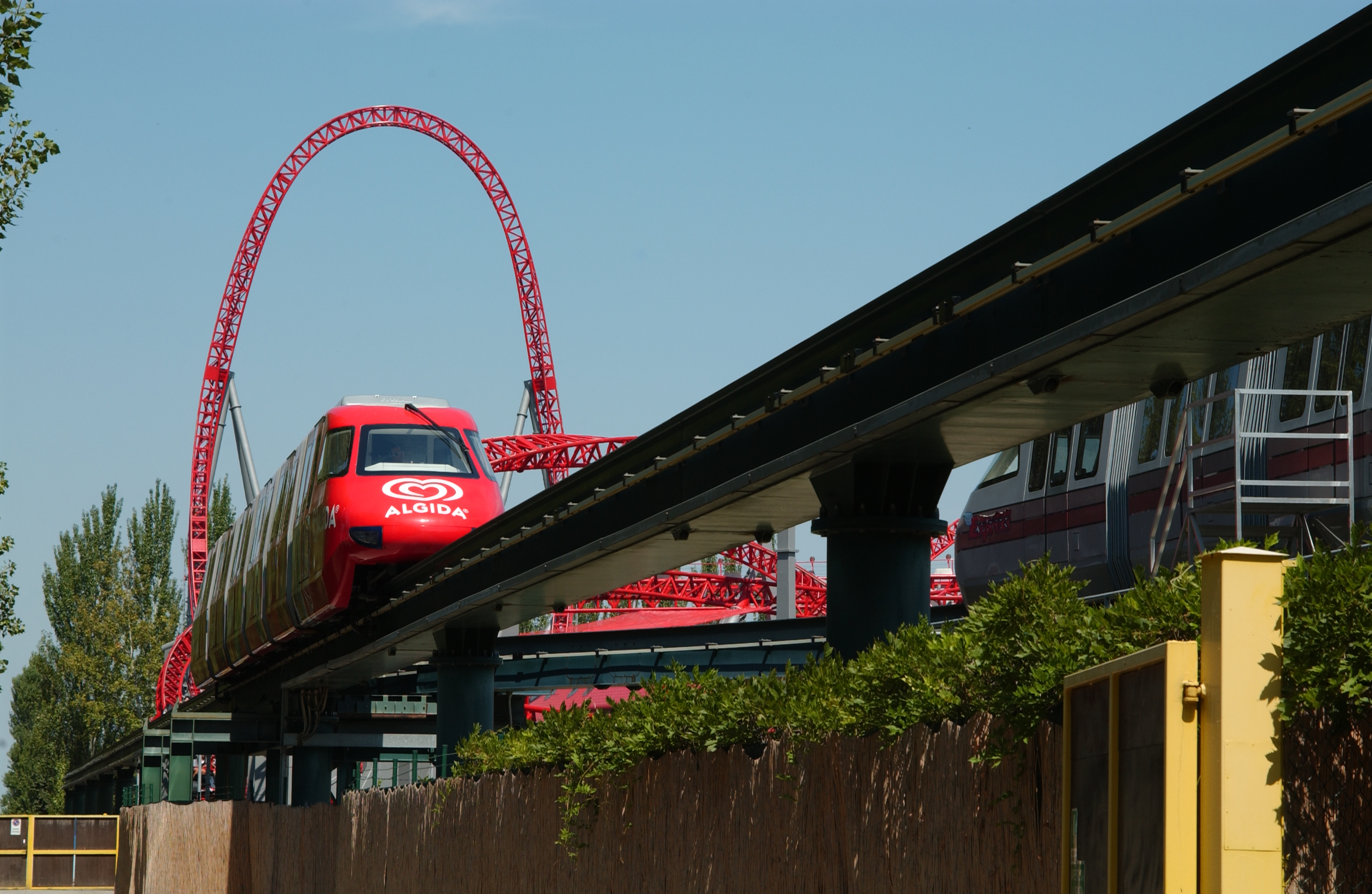
Mira Express at Mirabilandia

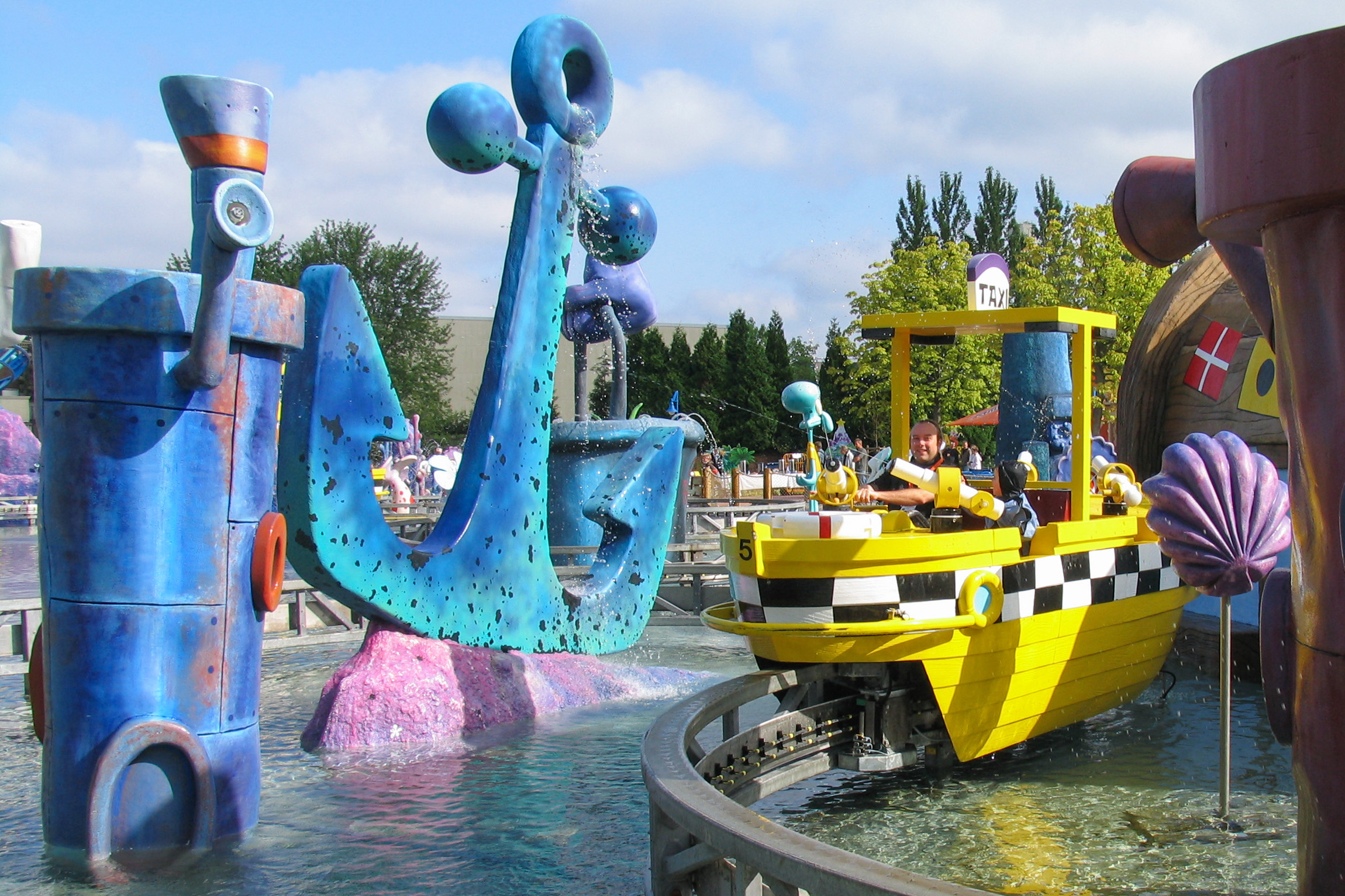
SpongeBob SplashBash at Movie Park Germany

Name	Country	Park	Model	In conjunction with	Opened	Status
Air Jumbo	United States	Six Flags Great Adventure	Flying Elephants		2005	Operating
Arthur & Fanny	Italy	Mirabilandia	Flying Elephants		2006	Operating
Banana Battle	Belgium	Bobbejaanland	Splash Battle	3DBA, P&P Projects	2008	Operating
Battaglia Navale	Italy	Rainbow Magicland	Splash Battle		2013	Operating
Bongo	Greece	Allou! Fun Park	Flying Elephants		October 2002	Operating
Boom Boom	Greece	Allou! Fun Park	Mini bumper cars		2003	Operating
Carousel	Greece	Allou! Fun Park	Carousel		October 2002	Operating
Crazy Barn	United States	Story Land	Crazy House		2003	Operating
Dämonen Gruft	Germany	Heide Park	Ghost train	Alterface, Merlin Entertainments, JP Showsystems, Pachinko Media, TAA Group, 400 Coups	2024	Operating
Dodgem Cars	Australia	Warner Bros. Movie World	Bumper cars		2007	Operating
Dora's Big River Adventure	Germany	Movie Park Germany	Flume Ride		2008	Operating
Flying Arturo	Italy	Mirabilandia	Flying Elephants			Operating
Flying Canoes	Canada	Canada's Wonderland	Flying Elephants		2018	Operating
Flying Jumbos	United Kingdom	Chessington World of Adventures	Flying Elephants		1987	Operating
Jumbo	United States	Great Escape	Flying Elephants			Closed in 2004
Jungle Water Fight	China	Happy Valley, Shenzhen	Splash Battle (trackless)	3DBA, Falcon's Treehouse, Frog AGV, P&P Projects	2008	Operating
Legend	Greece	Allou! Fun Park	Matterhorn (ride)		October 2002	Closed in 2023
The Magic Carousel	India	Adlabs Imagica	Carousel		April 18, 2013	Operating
Mira Express	Italy	Mirabilandia	Monorail		1999	Operating
New York	Greece	Allou! Fun Park	Bumper cars		October 2002	Operating
Raratonga	Italy	Mirabilandia	Splash Battle	3DBA	2007	Operating
Tuk Tuk Turmoil	United Kingdom	Chessington World of Adventures	Bumper cars		2000	Operating
Save the Pirate	India	Adlabs Imagica	Interactive Tower		April 18, 2013	Operating
Splash Ahoy!	India	Adlabs Imagica	Splash Battle	3DBA	April 18, 2013	Operating
Splash Battle	China	Chimg Long Paradise	Splash Battle	3DBA	2006	Operating
Splash Battle	United Kingdom	Flamingoland	Splash Battle	P&P Projects	July 2007	Operating
Splash Battle	United States	Indiana Beach	Splash Battle	3DBA		Operating
Splash Battle	United States	Legoland California	Splash Battle	3DBA	2006	Operating
Splash Battle	Netherlands	Walibi World	Splash Battle	3DBA	2005	Operating
Splash Battle Egypt	United States of America	Story Land	Splash Battle	3DBA	2011	Operating
SpongeBob Splash Bash	Germany	Movie Park Germany	Splash Battle	3DBA	2007	Operating
Sun & Moon Ferris Wheel	United States	Kentucky Kingdom	Ferris Wheel		1990	Operating
Tubby Takes Off	India	Adlabs Imagica	Flying Elephants		April 18, 2013	Operating
Würmling Express	Germany	Phantasialand	Monorail		2010	Operating
unknown	United States	Celebration City	Bumper cars		2003	Operating
unknown	China	Happy Valley, Shanghai	Splash Battle	3DBA	2009	Operating
unknown	Sweden	Liseberg	Bumper cars		2012	Operating
unknown	United Kingdom	M&D's	Flying Elephants		2006	Operating
unknown	Bulgaria	Sofia Land	Ferris wheel		July 2002	Operating
unknown	Bulgaria	Sofia Land	Drop tower		July 2002	Operating
unknown	Bulgaria	Sofia Land	Star Fire		July 2002	Operating
unknown	Portugal	Zoo Marine	River rapids ride	L&T Systems	2008	Operating
unknown	Italy	Zoomarine	Splash Battle	3DBA	2012	Operating
