= 2014 in amusement parks =

This is a list of events and openings related to amusement parks that occurred in 2014. These various lists are not exhaustive.

== Amusement parks ==
=== Opening ===
- China Chimelong Ocean Kingdom – 4 March 2014
- Italy Cinecittà World
- France Kingoland
- China Quancheng Euro Park - 27 April 2014
- Jordan Red Sea Astratrium
- China Romon World
- Russia Sochi Park Adventureland
- China Yancheng Happy Valley – 1 January 2014

=== Reopened ===
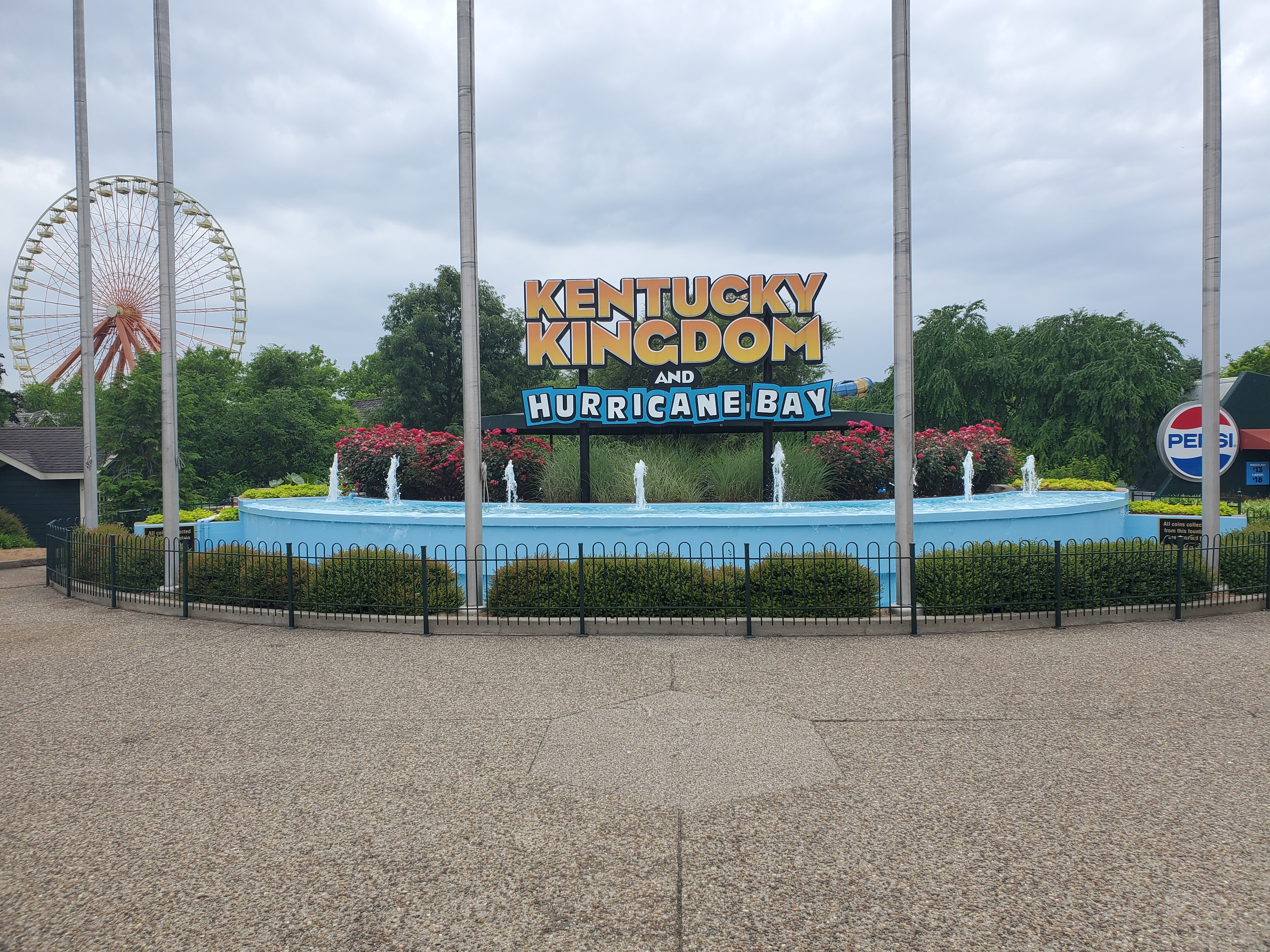
Kentucky Kingdom reopened in May after being closed for 5 years.

- USA Kentucky Kingdom – 24 May

=== Change of name ===
- USA Knott's Soak City (Palm Springs) » Wet'n'Wild Palm Springs
- USA Six Flags Kentucky Kingdom » Kentucky Kingdom
- USA Splashtown » Wet'n'Wild SplashTown
- USA Splash Adventure » Alabama Splash Adventure

=== Birthday ===
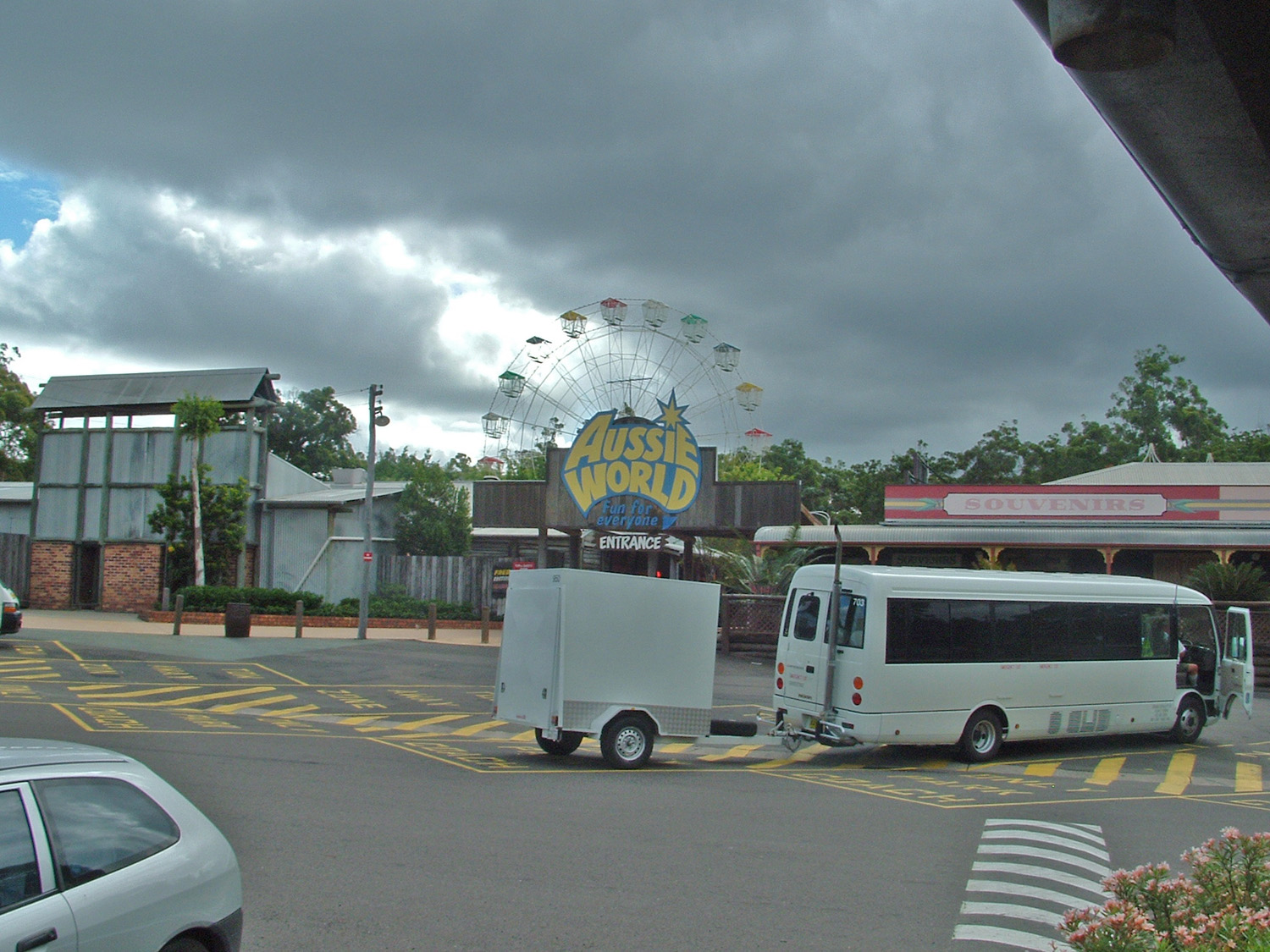
Aussie World celebrated its 25th anniversary in November

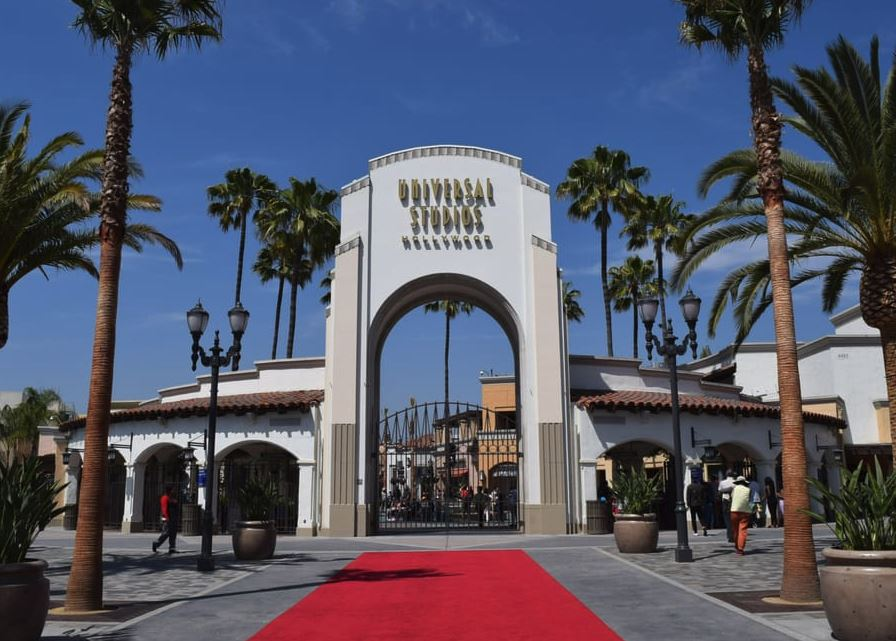
Universal Studios Hollywood celebrated its 50th anniversary in July.

- USA Mt. Olympus Water & Theme Park – 10th birthday
- Netherlands Walibi Holland – 20th birthday
- Australia Aussie World – 25th birthday
- USA Disney's Hollywood Studios – 25th birthday
- France Parc Astérix – 25th birthday
- France Puy du Fou – 25th birthday
- France Walygator Parc – 25th birthday
- Sweden Skara Sommarland – 30th birthday
- UK Thorpe Park – 35th birthday
- USA Six Flags Great Adventure – 40th birthday
- USA Morey's Piers – 45th birthday
- USA SeaWorld San Diego – 50th birthday
- USA Universal Studios Hollywood – 50th birthday
- Japan Yomiuriland – 50th birthday
- UK Flamingoland – 55th birthday
- Belgium Bellewaerde – 60th birthday
- USA Story Land – 60th birthday
- USA The Great Escape & Splashwater Kingdom – 60th birthday
- USA Dorney Park & Wildwater Kingdom – 130th birthday
- USA Kings Dominion – 40th birthday

=== Closed ===
- USA HoffMan PlayLand – 2014
- South Korea Daejanggeum Theme Park – January 1

== Additions ==
=== Roller coasters ===
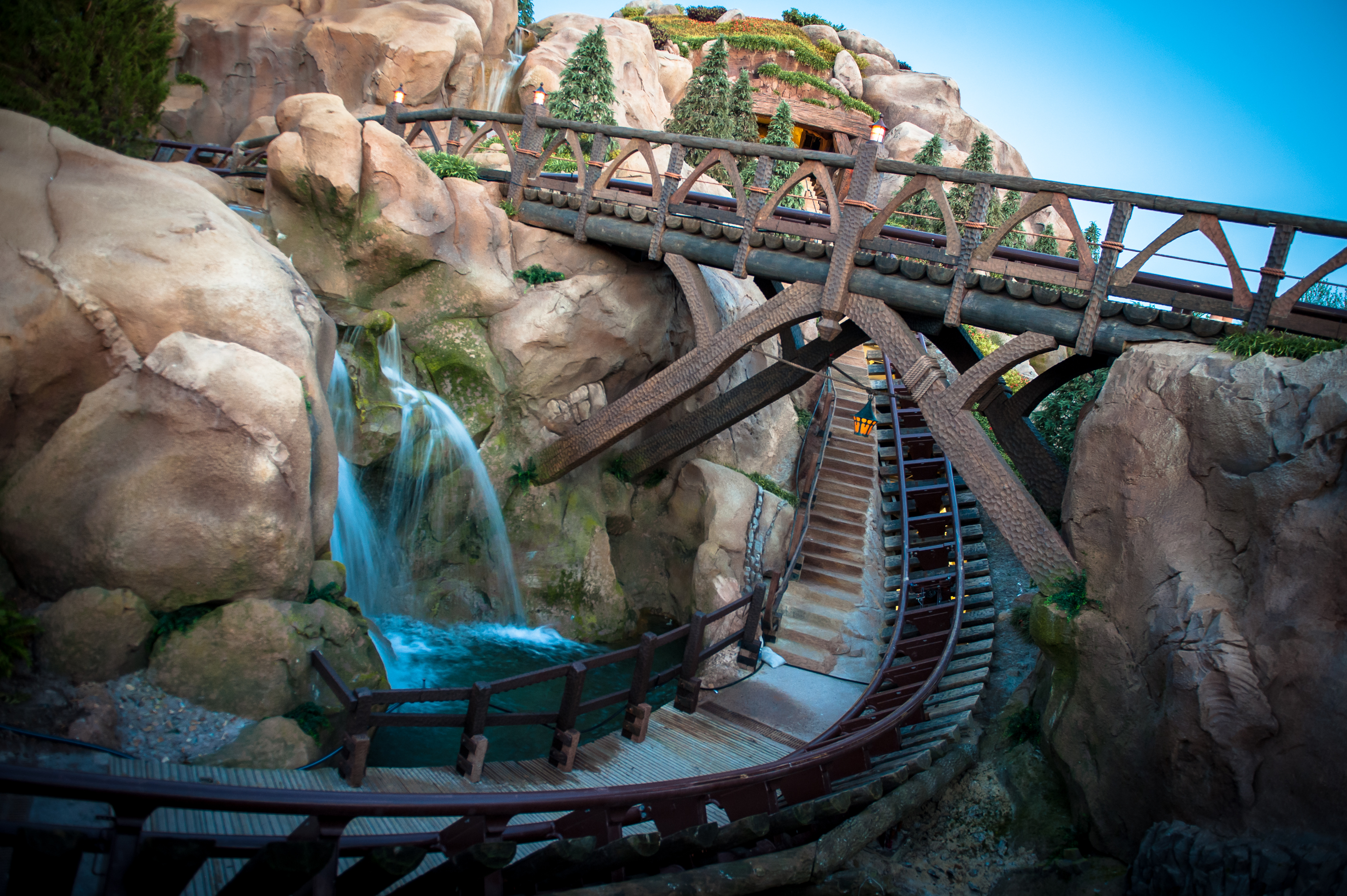
Seven Dwarfs Mine Train opened in May

==== New ====
Name	Park	Type	Manufacturer	Opened
1970 Galaxy Rip Tide Coaster	Miracle Strip at Pier Park	Steel roller coaster	S.D.C.	June 27
4 Ring Roller Coaster	Carde Happy World	Steel roller coaster	Hebei Zhongye	2014
Aérotrain	Parc Saint Paul	Junior roller coaster	Vekoma	April 12
Alpina Blitz	Nigloland	Steel roller coaster	Mack Rides	April 12
Altair CCW-0204	Cinecitta World	Steel roller coaster	Intamin	July 24
Arthur – The Ride	Europa Park	Suspended roller coaster	Mack Rides	June 19
Banshee	Kings Island	Inverted roller coaster	Bolliger & Mabillard	April 18
Bowl Flyer	Sochi Park Adventureland	Wild Mouse roller coaster	Mack Rides	2014
Cyclon Coaster	Didi'Land	Steel roller coaster	SBF Visa Group	April 12
Darkmare	Cinecitta World	Enclosed roller coaster	Intamin	July 24
Dragon	Sochi Park Adventureland	Launched roller coaster	Mack Rides	2014
El Loco	Adventuredome	El Loco	S&S Worldwide	February 18
Family Inverted Coaster	Happy Valley Shanghai	Inverted roller coaster	Bolliger & Mabillard	July 5
Family Roller Coaster	Carde Happy World	Steel roller coaster	Golden Horse	2014
FireChaser Express	Dollywood	Launched roller coaster	Gerstlauer	March 22
Flug der Dämonen	Heide Park	Wing Coaster	Bolliger & Mabillard	March 29
Goliath	Six Flags Great America	Wooden roller coaster	Rocky Mountain Construction	June 19
Hanging Roller Coaster	Carde Happy World	Inverted roller coaster	Golden Horse	2014
Harry Potter and the Escape from Gringotts	Universal Studios Florida	Enclosed roller coaster	Intamin	July 8
Helix	Liseberg	Launched roller coaster	Mack Rides	April 26
Krater	Colombian National Coffee Park	Euro-Fighter roller coaster	Gerstlauer	December 19
Lightning Run	Kentucky Kingdom	Steel roller coaster	Chance Rides	May 24
Parrot Coaster	Chime-Long Ocean Kingdom	Wing Coaster	Bolliger & Mabillard	January 25
Quantum Leap	Sochi Park Adventureland	Giant Inverted Boomerang	Vekoma	2014
Roar-O-Saurus	Story Land	Wooden roller coaster	The Gravity Group	May 24
Seven Dwarfs Mine Train	Magic Kingdom	Steel roller coaster	Vekoma	May 28
Sky Scream	Holiday Park	Launched roller coaster	Premier Rides	April 12
Speed Chenille	Kingoland	Steel roller coaster	Soquet	April 19
Speedy Gonzales Hot Rod Racers	Six Flags Magic Mountain	Steel roller coaster	Zamperla	June 25
Thunderbolt	Luna Park, Coney Island	Steel roller coaster	Zamperla	June 14
Twist Coaster Robin	Yomiuriland	El Loco	S&S Worldwide	March
Viktor's Race	Plopsaland	Steel roller coaster	Zierer	April 5
Wonder Mountain's Guardian	Canada's Wonderland	4D interactive dark ride/roller coaster	Triotech	May 24

==== Relocated ====
Name	Park	Type	Manufacturer	Opened	Formerly
Ragin' Cajun	Six Flags America	Spinning roller coaster	Zamperla	June 21	Ragin' Cajun at Six Flags Great America
Appolo Coaster	Kingoland	Steel roller coaster	Pinfari	April	Montagnes du Grand Canyon at OK Corral

==== Refurbished ====
Name	Park	Type	Manufacturer	Opened	Formerly
The Bat	Kings Island	Steel roller coaster	Arrow Dynamics	April 18	Flight Deck
Medusa Steel Coaster	Six Flags Mexico	Steel roller coaster	Rocky Mountain Construction	June 14	Medusa (Note: Medusa was a wooden roller coaster manufactured by Custom Coasters International that opened in 2000.)
Wilderness Run	Cedar Point	Steel roller coaster	Intamin	May 10	Jr. Gemini

=== Other attractions ===
==== New ====
Name	Park	Type	Opened
Bahama Blaster	Six Flags Fiesta Texas	Water slide complex	June 7
Bonzai Pipeline	Six Flags Hurricane Harbor, California	Water slide complex	May 26
Brain Drain	Elitch Gardens	Larson International 22 Meter Loop	May 3
Chiapas – DIE Wasserbahn	Germany Phantasialand	Intamin Log flume	April 1
Colossal Curl	Water Country USA	ProSlide WorldALLEY	May 23
Cornpoppy	Europa Park	Zierer family drop tower	April 5
Cookie's Monster Land	Sesame Place	Themed area	June 2
Demon	La Ronde	Roll Over	May 17
Despicable Me Minion Mayhem	Universal Studios Hollywood	Simulator ride	April 12
Dinoland	Mirabilandia	Themed area	June 20
Dorsal Fin Drop	Carolina Harbor	ProSlide Behemoth Bowl	June 21
Extreme Supernova	Great Escape	Frisbee	May 22
Falcon's Fury	Busch Gardens Tampa	Drop tower	September 2
French Quarter Flyers	Six Flags America	Larson Flying Scooters	April 5
Harry Potter and the Forbidden Journey	Universal Studios Japan	Dark ride	July 15
Hogwarts Express	Universal Orlando Resort	Funicular attraction	July 8
Hurricane Harbor	Six Flags Over Georgia	Water Park	May 29
Ihu Breakaway Falls	Aquatica Orlando	ProSlide multi-drop tower slide	May 9
Kapau Plummet	White Water Branson	Water Slide	May 17
Lake Erie Eagles	Cedar Point	Larson Flying Scooters	May 10
Mayflower	Holiday World & Splashin' Safari	Chance Rides pirate ship	May 3
Mul-Mul	Europa Park	Zamperla Jump Around	April 5
New England SkyScreamer	Six Flags New England	Tower swinger	May 24
Northern Lights	Valleyfair	Zamperla Skater Coaster	May 16
Paint the Night Parade	Hong Kong Disneyland	Parade	October 1
Pipe Scream	Cedar Point	Zamperla Skater Coaster	May 10
Prezzemolo Land	Gardaland	Play Ground	April 1
Ratatouille: L’Aventure Totalement Toquée de Rémy	Walt Disney Studios Park	Trackless dark ride	July 10
Snake Pit	Dorney Park & Wildwater Kingdom	Water slide complex	May 24
SteelHawk	Worlds of Fun	Mondial Wind Seeker	May 24
Storm Chaser	Adventureland	Mondial Wind Seeker	June 7
Super Silly Fun Land	Universal Studios Hollywood	Themed area	April 12
Surfer's Swell	Carolina Harbor	ProSlide Tornado Wave	June 21
Tail Spin	Dreamworld	Gerstlauer Sky Fly	September 20
Tsunami Soaker	Six Flags Discovery Kingdom	Mack Rides Twist 'n' Splash	May 31
Tsunami Soaker	Six Flags St. Louis	Mack Rides Twist 'n' Splash	May 24
The Lost Temple	Germany Movie Park Germany	Simulator ride	July 24
The Wizarding World of Harry Potter	Universal Studios Japan	Themed area	July 15
The Wizarding World of Harry Potter – Diagon Alley	Universal Studios Florida	Themed area	July 8
Triple Vortex	WhiteWater World (Dreamworld)	Water slide	September 20
Zumanjaro: Drop of Doom	Six Flags Great Adventure	Intamin drop tower	July 4
unknown	Cinecittà World	Intamin drop tower	Unknown
unknown	Cinecittà World	Mack Super Splash	Unknown

==== Refurbished ====
Name	Park	Type	Opened	Formerly	Ref(s)
CBeebies Land	Alton Towers	Themed Land	May 24	Old MacDonald's Farmyard	

== Closed attractions & roller coasters ==
Name	Park	Type	Closed
Camp Minnie-Mickey	Disney's Animal Kingdom	Themed area	January 6
Captain EO	Tokyo Disneyland	Show	June 30
Colossus	Six Flags Magic Mountain	Racing wooden roller coaster	August 16
Cyclone	Six Flags New England	Wooden roller coaster	July 20
Geyser Gulch	Silver Dollar City	Interactive Play House	August 3
Maelstrom	Epcot	Boat voyage	October 5
Mantis	Cedar Point	Stand-up roller coaster	October 19
Monster Rock!	Universal Studios Singapore	Show	August 31
Motorama	Six Flags Fiesta Texas	Morgan Sports Car Ride	August 10
Opa!	Mt. Olympus Water & Theme Park	Wild Mouse	March 6
Pixie Hollow	Magic Kingdom	Meet and greet	May 20
Reef Diver	Dreamworld	Enterprise	April 28
Remember... Dreams Come True	Disneyland	Fireworks show	November 2
Rhino Rally	Busch Gardens Tampa Bay	Safari Ride	September 1
Scooby-Doo! Ghostblasters: The Mystery of the Scary Swamp	Six Flags St. Louis	Interactive dark ride	September 14
Sea Viper	Sea World	Arrow Dynamics steel roller coaster	July 16
Silbermine	Germany Phantasialand	Schwarzkopf Dark ride	January
Skyrider	Canada's Wonderland	Stand-up roller coaster	September 1
Solar Flare	Galaxyland	Hoppla	March 14
Studio Backlot Tour	Disney's Hollywood Studios	Tram tour	September 27
The American Idol Experience	Disney's Hollywood Studios	Live singing auditions	August 30
The Legend Of Mythica	Tokyo Disney Sea	Daytime Show	Unknown
The Legend of Captain Jack Sparrow	Disney's Hollywood Studios	Interactive special effects experience	November 7
Universal's House of Horrors	Universal Studios Hollywood	Haunted attraction	September 1

== Records broken ==
Record name	Record attribute	Ride	Amusement Park	Date broken
World's steepest drop in a log flume	53°	Chiapas – DIE Wasserbahn	Phantasialand	April 1
World's longest inverted roller coaster	4,124 feet	Banshee	Kings Island	April 18
World's tallest swing ride	409 feet or 125 metres	New England SkyScreamer	Six Flags New England	May 24
World's longest wooden roller coaster drop	180-foot-tall (55 m)	Goliath	Six Flags Great America	June 19
World's fastest wooden roller coaster	72 miles per hour (116 km/h)	Goliath	Six Flags Great America	June 19
World's steepest wooden roller coaster	85°	Goliath	Six Flags Great America	June 19
Amusement park with the most number of roller coasters	19 roller coasters	Speedy Gonzales Hot Rod Racers	Six Flags Magic Mountain	June 25
World's Tallest Vertical Drop Ride	415 feet	Zumanjaro: Drop of Doom	Six Flags Great Adventure	July 4

== Themed Accommodation ==
=== New ===
Name	Park	Theme	Opening	ref(s)
Universal's Cabana Bay Beach Resort	Universal Orlando Resort	50's Pop culture	March 31	
Azteca Hotel	Chessington World of Adventures	Aztecs	2014	

== See also ==
- List of roller coaster rankings
