= P&P Projects =

P&P Projects is an international company that first started as a one-man business in Asten, Netherlands making space models and that now specializes in projects for the leisure industry. The company has been constructing and decorating projects for several organisations such as theme parks, museums, visitor centres, family entertainment centres, zoos and swimming pools around the world. P&P Projects specializes in theming, scenery, props, inter-actives, exhibits, animatronics, specials, scale models, and high quality interiors.

The company has a premises of 2,250 square meters. The production workshop measures 2,000 square meters and the office 250 square meters.

== Projects ==
- Theme park projects
  - The Amsterdam Dungeon, the Netherlands
  - Aquatopia Antwerp, Belgium
  - Banana Splash Bobbejaanland, Belgium
  - Earth Explorer 2004 Oostende, Belgium
  - Europa-Park, Germany - Euro-Mir, Iceland / Blue Fire, and Minimoys Kingdom / Arthur – The Ride
  - Flamingo Land, United Kingdom
  - F1 Nürburgring Ring°Werk, Germany. P&P Projects did the theming of the dark rides, a large theatre, race simulators, pit boxes and car replicas.
  - Gold Rush, Attractiepark Slagharen
  - Joris en de Draak, Efteling
  - Legoland California, United States of America
  - Madame Tussauds Berlin, Germany
  - Walibi Holland the Netherlands - Speed of Sound (roller coaster), Splash Battle, and Xpress: Platform 13
  - Walibi Sud-Ouest, France
- Museums
  - Roshen, Ukraine
  - Glasgow Science Centre, Scotland
  - Visitor Centre Volkswagen Autostadt, Germany
  - Sea Life Centres, Blackpool United Kingdom, Spain, the Netherlands

== P&P Project Development ==
This company was founded in 2006 and specializes in design for the leisure industry and television, along with consultancy, project management, graphical design, and inter-actives.

- Projects P&P Development
  - Odysseum, Cologne Germany
  - Lotte World parade, South Korea
