= Cosmic Coaster =

Cosmic Coaster may refer to one of two junior roller coasters:

- Cosmic Coaster (Valleyfair), at Valleyfair in Shakopee, Minnesota
- Cosmic Coaster (Worlds of Fun), at Worlds of Fun in Kansas City, Missouri
