= Avengers Assemble: Flight Force =

Indoor roller coaster at Disney Adventure World

Disney Adventure World
- Location: Disney Adventure World
- Park section: Avengers Campus
- Coordinates: 48.864850°N 2.779931°E
- Status: Operating
- Opening date: July 20, 2022
- Replaced: Rock 'n' Roller Coaster avec Aerosmith (Backlot)

General statistics
- Type: Steel – Enclosed – Launched
- Manufacturer: Vekoma
- Designer: Walt Disney Imagineering
- Model: LSM Coaster
- Lift/launch system: LSM launch
- Height: 80 ft (24 m)
- Length: 3,267.7 ft (996.0 m)
- Speed: 57 mph (92 km/h)
- Inversions: 3
- Duration: 1:22
- Capacity: 1,800 riders per hour
- Acceleration: 0 to 57 mph (0 to 92 km/h) in 2.8 seconds
- G-force: 5
- Height restriction: 48 in (122 cm)
- Trains: 6 cars; riders arranged 2 across in 2 rows for a total of 24 riders per train
- Theme: Avengers
- Must transfer from wheelchair
- Avengers Assemble: Flight Force at RCDB

Avengers Assemble: Flight Force is an indoor launched roller coaster located at Disney Adventure World within Disneyland Paris. It uses linear motor electromagnetic technology for acceleration, which propels riders from 0 to 57 mph (92 km/h) in 2.8 seconds. Riders experience up to 5 Gs and travel through three inversions, which include a sea serpent and a corkscrew. Manufactured by Vekoma, the roller coaster opened to the public on July 20, 2022 as a re-theme of Rock 'n' Roller Coaster avec Aerosmith.

== History ==
The ride originally opened as Rock 'n' Roller Coaster avec Aerosmith at the then-named Walt Disney Studios Park in time for the park's grand opening on March 16, 2002 as a second installation of the original ride at Disney's Hollywood Studios at Walt Disney World. While it featured the same track layout as the Walt Disney World installation, its theme is completely different, with guests entering Tour de Force Records and trying out a revolutionary new music experience by boarding Soundtracker trains. Joining Studio Tram Tour: Behind the Magic and Flying Carpets Over Agrabah as one of the park's three opening day rides, it was located next to Moteurs... Action!: Stunt Show Spectacular in the Backlot area.

It was announced at the 2018 D23 Expo in Japan that the Walt Disney Studios Park location would be receiving a complete remodel that would feature a new theme based on the Iron Man and Avengers franchises of the Marvel Cinematic Universe. The original ride officially closed on September 2, 2019 for its transformation. As work began, the entrance sign was completely removed by the middle of the month.

In April 2022, the rethemed ride would be named Avengers Assemble: Flight Force. On July 20, 2022, it officially opened as part of the new Avengers Campus themed land at the park.

In 2023, new effects were added to the ride, such as laser projections that display a starfield.

== Ride experience ==
=== Queue ===
Guests enter the QG Avengers where Iron Man is tracking a series of warheads being sent at the Earth from the alien empire of the Kree. Iron Man and his AI, "F.R.I.D.A.Y." are unable to find any superhero allies able to assist them, causing them to recruit guests of the campus to board Stark spaceships called the "Hypersonique" to assist Stark and Captain Marvel in warding off the warheads.

Iron Man is depicted only in armor, including life-sized animatronics, and speaking French with the voice of his Marvel Cinematic Universe dubber, Bernard Gabay. Captain Marvel appears through new footage of Brie Larson filmed specially for the attraction, with all her dialogue in English.

=== On-ride ===
The ride launches guests from 0 to approximately 57 mph (92 km/h) in under three seconds. It features inversions, rapid turns, and synchronized onboard audio and lighting effects. Screens and projections simulate a space battle alongside Captain Marvel, enhancing the sense of speed and immersion.

=== French and English Cast ===
- Bernard Gabay as Tony Stark/Iron Man (voice)
- Brie Larson as Carol Danvers/Captain Marvel

== See also ==
- Xpress: Platform 13, an identical roller coaster at Walibi Holland
