= Speed of sound (disambiguation) =

The speed of sound is a physical characteristic.

Speed of sound may also refer to:

== Music ==
=== Albums ===
- Speed of Sound (Anvil album), 1999
- Speed of Sound, by Nick Phoenix, 2013
- The Speed of Sound (album), by Ronnie Montrose, 1988
- The Speed of Sound (EP), by In Stereo, 2016

=== Songs ===
- "Speed of Sound" (song), by Coldplay, 2005
- "Speed of Sound", by Chris Bell from I Am the Cosmos, 1992 (recorded 1974/5)
- "Speed of Sound", by Communist Daughter, 2010
- "Speed of Sound", by Pearl Jam from Backspacer, 2009
- "Speed of Sound", by Perfume from Triangle, 2009
- "Speed of Sound", by Ringo Starr from Give More Love, 2017

== Other uses ==
- "Speed of Sound" (Ben 10), a 2020 television episode
- Speed of Sound (roller coaster), at Walibi Holland theme park in Biddinghuizen, Netherlands
- The Speed of Sound, a 1997 book by Scott Eyman
- The Speed of Sound, a 2016 memoir by Thomas Dolby

== See also ==
- Wings at the Speed of Sound, an album by Wings, 1976
- Velocity of Sound, an album by the Apples in Stereo, 2002
- "Velocity of Sound", a song by Hitomi Momoi on the I've Sound album Out Flow, 2001
