= Air Jumbo =

Amusement ride at Six Flags Great Adventure

Six Flags Great Adventure
- Area: Lakefront
- Status: Operating
- Opening date: 2005

Six Flags Great Escape and Hurricane Harbor
- Status: Removed
- Opening date: 1960
- Closing date: 2004

Ride statistics
- Attraction type: Aerial carousel
- Manufacturer: Preston & Barbieri
- Capacity: 480 riders per hour
- Vehicle type: Elephants
- Vehicles: 12
- Riders per vehicle: 2

Air Jumbo (formerly known as Jumbo) is a Telecombat-style aerial carousel located in the Lakefront section of Six Flags Great Adventure in Jackson, New Jersey, United States. The attraction opened at the park in 2005.

== History ==
=== Six Flags Great Escape and Hurricane Harbor (1960–2004) ===
Air Jumbo originally operated as Jumbo at Six Flags Great Escape and Hurricane Harbor in Queensbury, New York. It opened in 1960, and remained at the park until 2004, when it was relocated to Six Flags Great Adventure.

=== Six Flags Great Adventure (2005–present) ===
The ride was renamed to Royal Elephants when it opened in 2005 at Six Flags Great Adventure. It was located in the new children's area, Balin's Jungle Land, a subsection of the Golden Kingdom section. The ride had an Asian theme. For much of the 2008 season, the ride was inactive, until being it was removed later that year when Balin's Jungle Land was subject to an overhaul. The ride returned for the start of the 2010 season, but this was short-lived. By the end of the 2010 season, it was removed again to make room for the park's 2011 attraction, Safari Discoveries.

On May 23, 2012, Royal Elephant reopened as Air Jumbo in the new Adventure Alley section, across the park from where the ride previously operated. The attraction utilized the empty space that formerly housed the Pirate's Flight attraction from 1999 to 2001.

== Ride ==
Air Jumbo has twelve two-person gondolas, each shaped like an elephant and mounted on articulated armatures connected to a rotating hub. The riders in the elephants can maneuver them up and down, which operates a hydraulic ram. The ride itself rotates clockwise at a constant rate.

== See also ==
- 2012 in amusement parks
