= Xpress: Platform 13 =

Amusement ride

- Previously known as Superman The Ride at Six Flags Holland (2000–2004); Xpress at Walibi World/Walibi Holland (2005–2013)
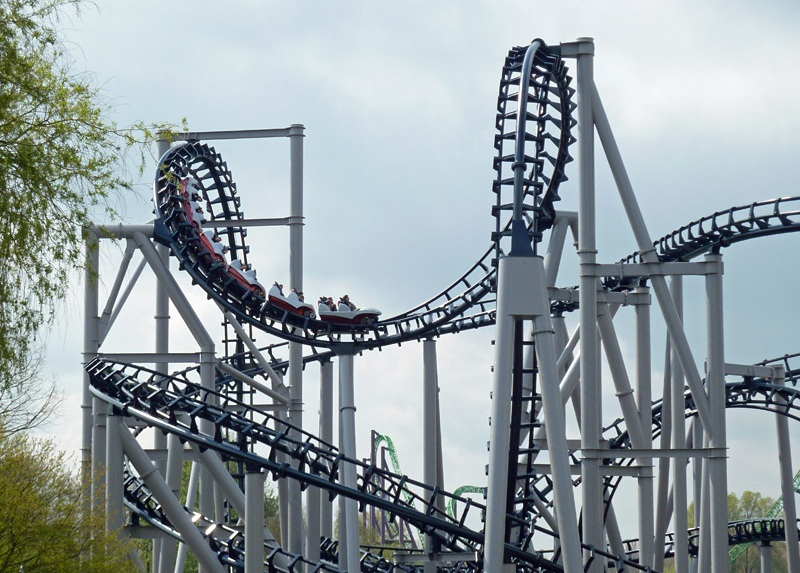
- Xpress: Platform 13

Walibi Holland
- Location: Walibi Holland
- Park section: Hollywood The Main Street
- Coordinates: 52°26′21″N 5°45′50″E
- Status: Operating
- Opening date: April 2000

General statistics
- Type: Steel – Launched
- Manufacturer: Vekoma
- Model: LSM Coaster
- Lift/launch system: LSM launch
- Height: 85 ft (26 m)
- Length: 3,267 ft (996 m)
- Speed: 55.9 mph (90.0 km/h)
- Inversions: 3
- Duration: 100 seconds
- Capacity: 1200 riders per hour
- Acceleration: 0 − 55.9 mph in 2.8 seconds
- Height restriction: 120 cm (3 ft 11 in)
- Xpress: Platform 13 at RCDB

Video

Xpress: Platform 13 is a steel roller coaster at Walibi Holland in Biddinghuizen, Netherlands which was launched as Superman The Ride in April 2000. The name was changed to Xpress in the season of 2005, and Xpress: Platform 13 in 2014. It was the first LSM-coaster in Europe.

== The Ride ==
After the train has been locked and checked, it slowly advances out of the station to the launch area. The train goes through a tunnel, where the passengers wait until the countdown starts. After the countdown, the trains, which exist out of 2 across in 2 rows for a total of 24 riders per train, are accelerated from 0 - 55.9 mph (90 km/h) in 2.8 seconds. It first climbs into a Sea Serpent Roll, which is a 2 inversion element. Then the train plunges into numerous turns and helixes and the 3rd inversion, a corkscrew. The train then passes in through a mid course brake run, makes a few turns then travels into the final brake run. When the final brake run is completed, the car goes into the station where the unloading process begins.

== Ride Facts ==
- Two 24-passenger trains. One colored red and silver, one colored purple and silver.
- Three inversions.
- Over 150 LSMs.
- Over the shoulder harnesses.
- Maximum height: 80 ft.
- Almost identical layout to Rock 'n' Roller Coaster at Disney's Hollywood Studios and Avengers Assemble: Flight Force at Disney Adventure World.
- Manufactured by: Vekoma international of the Netherlands.

== History ==
The Xpress / Superman was initially to be called "Riddler's Revenge" and was painted green at the factory. Shortly before the ride was installed, it was decided that Europeans know of Batman, but not necessarily all of the related villains. So the track was repainted with red and blue supports and given a Superman theme. The station was given the theme of the Daily Planet offices.

The ride was launched in April 2000 in the theme park Six Flags Holland. Following the sale of all of Six Flags' European parks in 2004, the park was changed to Walibi World just before the beginning of the 2005 season. Any references to Looney Tunes and DC Comics characters had to be removed from the park before opening day. The name of Superman The Ride was changed to Xpress.

The Xpress has nearly the same track layout as the "Rock 'n' Roller Coaster" models at Disney Parks (Rock 'n' Roller Coaster, Disney's Hollywood Studios and Avengers Assemble: Flight Force, Disney Adventure World). The Rock 'n' Roller Coaster's layout is a bit more spacious to compensate for a higher speed launch due to the trains being heavier with the musical hardware.

In 2011, small cracks were found in the stators, and their metal inside started to rust. New stators were ordered, and were delivered in February 2012. Therefore, the coaster was standing but not operating for the whole 2011 season. In August 2011, Walibi Holland decided to re-paint the track, to get rid of the old Superman colors (Black track and Grey supports.). Xpress Reopened In April 2012.

In September 2013, P&P Projects began working on a renovation of the ride set to reopen in 2014.

In 2014, the ride was reopened as Xpress Platform 13 with a new theme based on a backstory about a forbidden subway station. The guests walk through this subway station as they enter the ride, which starts out as a normal subway station but gets darker and more horror-based as the guests progress towards the actual ride entrance.
