= Quancheng Euro Park =

Theme park in Shandong, China

Quancheng Euro Park 泉城欧乐堡梦幻世界 Quánchéng ōu lè bǎo mènghuàn shìjiè
- Interactive map of Quancheng Euro Park 泉城欧乐堡梦幻世界; Quánchéng ōu lè bǎo mènghuàn shìjiè
- Location: Qihe County, Dezhou, Shandong, China
- Coordinates: 36°45′03.7″N 116°50′09.7″E
- Status: Operating
- Opened: 27 April 2014; 12 years ago
- Theme: Europe
- Operating season: Year-round

Attractions
- Total: 36
- Roller coasters: 9
- Water rides: 3
- Shows: 2
- Website: Official website

Quancheng Euro Park (Chinese: 泉城欧乐堡梦幻世界; pinyin: Quánchéng ōu lè bǎo mènghuàn shìjiè) (also known as Euro Park Dreamworld or simply Euro Park) is a theme park located in the Qihe County of Dezhou in the Shandong province of China, part of the Quancheng Euro Park International Tourism Resort. Quancheng Euro Park is classified as an AAAA scenic area by the China National Tourism Administration.

The park opened on 27 April 2014. The park features a variety of attractions including 9 roller coasters. Attractions range from children rides such as Children Coaster to more intense thrill rides such as Battle of Blue Fire.

== History ==
Quancheng Euro Park opened on 27 April 2014 with 5 roller coasters and several of other rides and attractions. On 1 May 2014, the park opened 3 new roller coasters, Mine Coaster, Motor Coaster and White Horse Coaster. The Galaxy Coaster was opened in October 2014. In 2016, the park relocated the Children Coaster to another area of the park.

== Rides and attractions ==
The park offers a variety of rides and attractions split across 8 different themed areas, including 9 roller coasters. The 8 themed areas are:

- Castle in the Sky
- Dragon Heart
- Dutch Town
- Fairytale Town
- Oz the Great and Powerful
- Uncharted Lake
- Wild Africa

=== Castle in the Sky ===
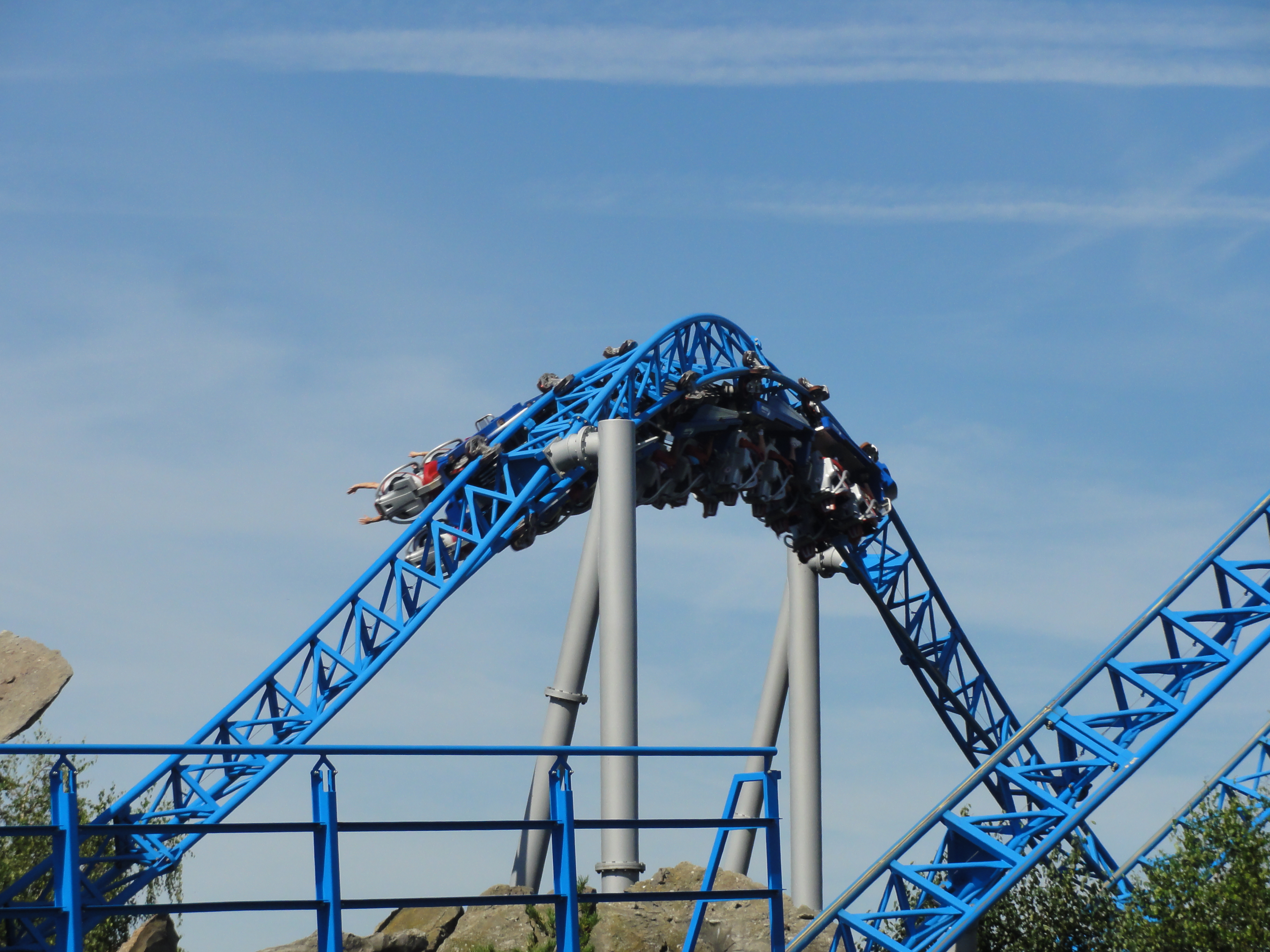
Battle of Blue Fire is based on the Blue Fire model.

- Battle of Blue Fire - a launched roller coaster built by MACK Rides in 2014.
- The Galaxy Coaster - an indoor steel roller coaster built by Beijing Jiuhua Amusement Rides Manufacturing Co. in 2014.
- Time Travel - a 20 metres (66 ft) tall drop tower.
- Tumbling Waves - a top spin ride.
- Global Journey - a flying theater ride.

=== Dragon Heart ===
- Mine Coaster - a mine train roller coaster built by Beijing Jiuhua Amusement Rides Manufacturing Co. in 2014.
- Moto Coaster - a motorbike roller coaster built by Beijing Jiuhua Amusement Rides Manufacturing Co. in 2014.
- Spinning Coaster - a wild mouse spinning roller coaster built by Beijing Jiuhua Amusement Rides Manufacturing Co. in 2014.
- White Horse Coaster - an indoor family steel roller coaster built by Beijing Jiuhua Amusement Rides Manufacturing Co. in 2014.

=== Dutch Town ===
- Arc de Triomphe - a 180 metres (590 ft) long and 59 metres (194 ft) tall arch located at the front of the park. Inspired by the Arc de Triomphe in Paris, France.
- Train - a theme park train ride which travels around the park's perimeter and through several of landmarks.
- Dutch Town - a Dutch themed town.

=== Fairytale Town ===
- Bouncing Kangaroo - a children rotating ride.
- Bumper Cars - a bumper cars attraction.
- Children Coaster - a children's roller coaster built by Beijing Jiuhua Amusement Rides Manufacturing Co. in 2018. Relocated in 2016.
- Couple Dance - an Oktoberfest themed moving tea cup ride.
- Fairytale Carousel - a carousel ride.
- Frog Jump - a kids drop tower.
- Happy Straw Hat - a family rotating ride.
- Haunted House Black Death - a haunted house attraction.
- Magic Castle
- Magic Umbrella Tower - a children's ride.
- Samba Balloons - a samba balloons ride.

=== Oz the Great and Powerful ===
- Animal Crisis - a 3D dark ride attraction.
- Canyoning - a river rapids ride attraction.
- Cloud Sprint - a shoot the chute flume ride.
- Crazy Snow Board - a steel roller coaster built by Beijing Jiuhua Amusement Rides Manufacturing Co. in 2014.
- Flying Wings - a star flyer ride.
- Thor's Pendulum - a frisbee ride with a maximum angle of 180°.

=== Uncharted Lake ===
- Black Witch Knight - a Disk'O ride.
- Flying Man - a cliffhanger ride.
- Magic Windmill- a power surge ride.
- Pirates - a pirate ship ride.
- Swan Castle - a 52 metres (171 ft) tall European-styled castle which can be used for events and weddings.

=== Wild Africa ===
- Twister - a steel inverted roller coaster built by Beijing Jiuhua Amusement Rides Manufacturing Co. in 2014.

== Live performances ==
Quancheng Euro Park has two major live performances:

- Euro Park Dream Circus - a live circus show themed around several of countries such as Russia, Kazakhstan, Ukraine and Mongolia. The hour-long show features high-rise acrobatic acts, naive animal games, clown comedy, Kazakh knights, Russian-styled dances and other acts.
- Horse Fighting Equestrian Show - a live horse fighting equestrian show themed to Genghis Khan. The show portrays Khan's wars across the Eurasian continent and its history.

== Transport ==
Bus routes K906 and K915 serves the Quancheng Ocean World bus station. Quancheng Euro Park is also a 20 minutes drive away from Jinan West railway station and 35 minutes drive away from Jinan railway station. The park is also a 45-minute drive from Jinan Yaoqiang Airport.

== See also ==
- 2014 in amusement parks
