= Rock 'n' Roller Coaster =

Indoor roller coaster at Disney's Hollywood Studios

- A large, multicolored Fender Stratocaster on display outside the attraction in Florida, during the Starring The Muppets iteration

Disney's Hollywood Studios
- Park section: Sunset Boulevard
- Coordinates: 28°21′33.9″N 81°33′38.5″W
- Status: Operating
- Soft opening date: May 20, 2026 (Starring The Muppets)
- Opening date: July 29, 1999 (Starring Aerosmith); May 26, 2026 (Starring The Muppets)
- Closing date: March 2, 2026 (Starring Aerosmith)
- Single rider line available
- Rock 'n' Roller Coaster at Disney's Hollywood Studios at RCDB

Walt Disney Studios Park
- Name: Rock 'n' Roller Coaster avec Aerosmith
- Park section: Backlot
- Coordinates: 48.864850°N 2.779931°E
- Status: Closed
- Opening date: March 16, 2002
- Closing date: September 2, 2019
- Replaced by: Avengers Assemble: Flight Force (Avengers Campus)
- Rock 'n' Roller Coaster at Walt Disney Studios Park at RCDB

General statistics
- Type: Steel – Enclosed – Launched
- Manufacturer: Vekoma
- Designer: Walt Disney Imagineering
- Model: LSM Coaster
- Lift/launch system: LSM launch
- Height: 80 ft (24 m)
- Length: 3,267.7 ft (996.0 m)
- Speed: 57 mph (92 km/h)
- Inversions: 3
- Duration: 1:22
- Capacity: 1,800 riders per hour
- Acceleration: 0 to 57 mph (0 to 92 km/h) in 2.8 seconds
- G-force: 5
- Height restriction: 48 in (122 cm)
- Trains: 5 trains with 6 cars; riders arranged 2 across in 2 rows for a total of 24 riders per train
- Theme: Aerosmith (1999–2026: Florida; 2002–2019: Paris); The Muppets (2026–present: Florida)
- Sponsors: Gibson (1999–2008: Florida); Hanes (2018–2021: Florida)
- Audio-animatronics: 5 (Starring The Muppets)
- Must transfer from wheelchair

Rock 'n' Roller Coaster is an indoor launched roller coaster located at Disney's Hollywood Studios at Walt Disney World, and formerly at Walt Disney Studios Park (now Disney Adventure World) at Disneyland Paris. Manufactured by Vekoma, the roller coaster opened to the public on July 29, 1999. It uses linear motor electromagnetic technology for acceleration, which propels riders from 0 to 57 mph (92 km/h) in 2.8 seconds. Riders experience up to 5 Gs and travel through three inversions, which include a sea serpent and a corkscrew.

The first iteration, Rock 'n' Roller Coaster Starring Aerosmith, featured recorded music and appearances from American rock band Aerosmith. A second installation with an identical track layout opened within Disneyland Paris as Rock 'n' Roller Coaster avec Aerosmith in time for the opening of Walt Disney Studios Park on March 16, 2002. The attraction was later re-themed to Avengers Assemble: Flight Force as part of the new Avengers Campus at the park. The original iteration at Disney's Hollywood Studios closed on March 2, 2026.

The second iteration, Rock 'n' Roller Coaster Starring The Muppets, featuring music performed by Dr. Teeth and the Electric Mayhem from The Muppets, opened on May 26, 2026.

== History ==
=== Starring Aerosmith ===
==== Disney's Hollywood Studios (1999–2026) ====
In April 1998, Disney-MGM Studios (later named Disney's Hollywood Studios) announced that they would be adding Rock 'n' Roller Coaster. The ride was set to open in 1999 for the park's tenth anniversary. It would be located next to The Twilight Zone Tower of Terror in the Sunset Boulevard section, joining Fantasmic! as part of the area's late 1990s expansion. The park hired Vekoma to build the launched indoor roller coaster, and construction began two months prior to the announcement in February 1998. The track layout was completed by June 1998.

Soft opening cast member previews began in June 1999. The following month, the attraction held its grand opening on July 29 with a special, invitation-only party featuring Aerosmith as the guests of honor. Winners were taken to the park in stretch limousines and received complimentary meals. After a special performance by painter Denny Dent, winners received the chance to ride the roller coaster with one of the Aerosmith band members. A picture from the special event was on display near the exit of the ride. In each seat of each train, five speakers surrounded each rider, consisting of two mid-range speakers, two tweeters, and a subwoofer placed under the seat.

On December 17, 2015, the location at Disney's Hollywood Studios hosted a special one-night-only overlay for Star Wars Galactic Nights, to promote the release of Star Wars: The Force Awakens the same year. The queue line featured Star Wars movie posters, the Aerosmith pre-show was disabled and the speakers played music from the film. The same Star Wars overlay also occurred on April 14, 2017.

In 2016, the pre-show at Disney's Hollywood Studios was edited to digitally remove a "crude hand gesture" known as "The Shocker" made by Steven Tyler. In 2017, the Disney's Hollywood Studios location received new television screens mounted in the queue line, as guests approached the boarding area, displaying loading and safety steps in an effort to reduce boarding time. In addition, the exterior of the main ride building was given a new coat of paint.

==== Walt Disney Studios Park (2002–2019) ====
The attraction's version at Walt Disney Studios Park (now Disney Adventure World) officially made its debut in time for the park's grand opening on March 16, 2002. It featured the same track layout as the Walt Disney World installation, but the theme and queue line were different. The attraction was located in the Backlot area near Moteurs... Action!: Stunt Show Spectacular, becoming one of the park's only three opening day rides, with Studio Tram Tour: Behind the Magic and Flying Carpets Over Agrabah being the others. In 2007, the queue was modified to accommodate single riders in addition to FASTPASS.

It was announced at the 2018 D23 Expo in Japan that the Walt Disney Studios Park location would be receiving a complete remodel that would feature a new theme based on the Iron Man and Avengers franchises of the Marvel Cinematic Universe. The attraction officially closed on September 2, 2019, for its transformation, reopening as the newly revamped Avengers Assemble: Flight Force on July 20, 2022, as part of the new Avengers Campus themed land.

=== Starring The Muppets (2026–present) ===
In November 2024 in conjunction with the announcement of the closure of Muppet*Vision 3D, Disney announced that Rock 'n' Roller Coaster at Disney's Hollywood Studios would be re-themed to feature The Muppets, while retaining the attraction's name, scheduled for a summer 2026 opening. In preparation for the attraction's re-theme, the Aerosmith pre-show was removed from the attraction in December 2025, with the Aerosmith iteration closing on March 2, 2026. In April 2026, the attraction's soundtrack was revealed, featuring covers of five well-known songs performed by The Electric Mayhem with guests artists in all but one; the same day, the opening date of the attraction was announced. Rock 'n' Roller Coaster Starring The Muppets opened on May 26, 2026.

On October 6, 2026, it was announced that a new holiday overlay called Rock 'n' Roller Coaster Starring The Muppets: Obligatory Holiday Overlay, with four holiday songs and more, will be ran from November 4, 2026 to January 6, 2027 in Sunset Boulevard at Disney's Hollywood Studios, as part of Disney's Jollywood Nights, which is part of Walt Disney World Resort's 55th anniversary celebration.

== Ride experience (Starring Aerosmith) ==
=== Disney's Hollywood Studios ===
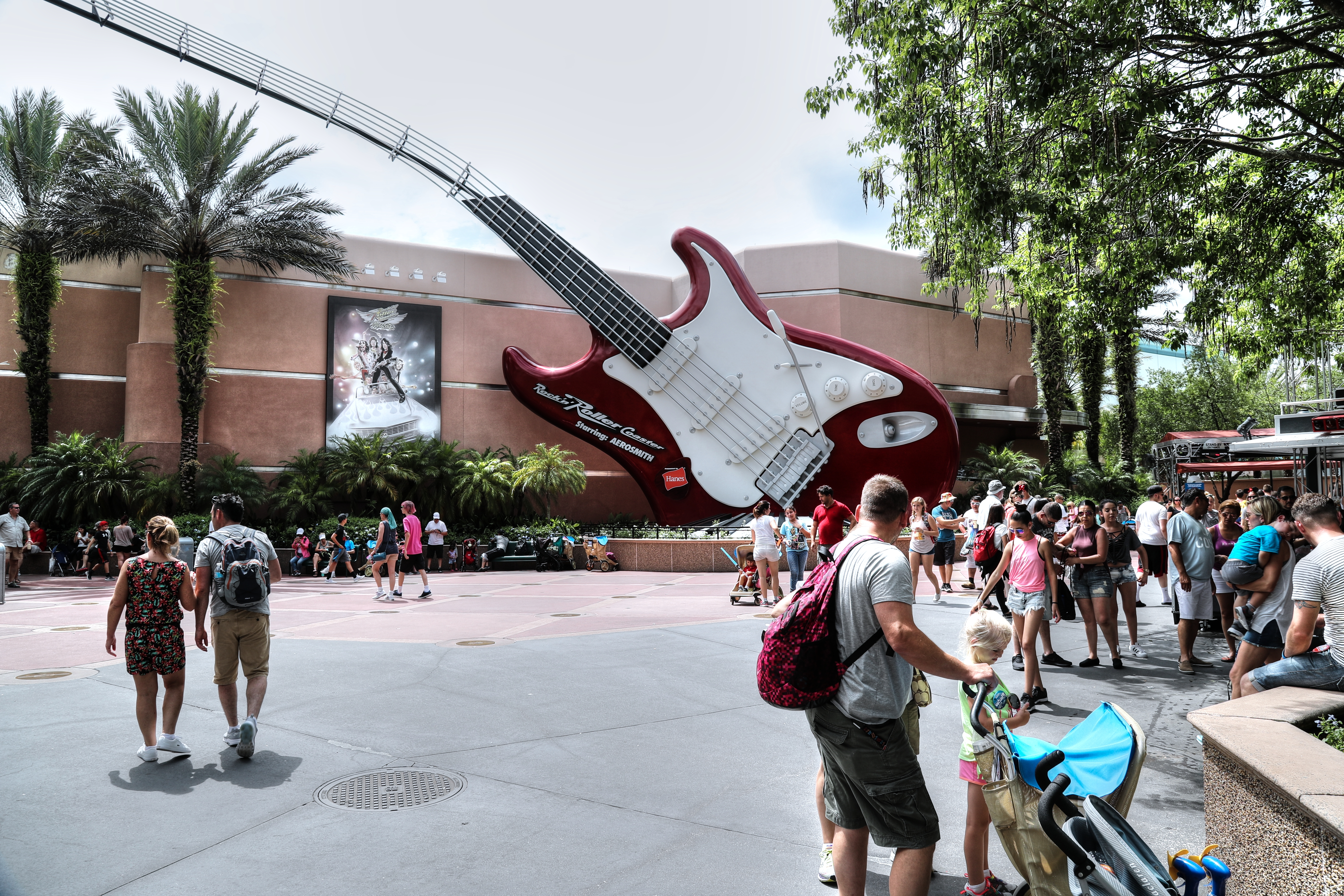
Attraction exterior during the Starring Aerosmith iteration.

==== Queue ====
As guests entered the queue line, they walked into a high-ceilinged circular room themed to a fictional record label called G-Force Records. Walls were decorated with ceiling-high guitars and digital posters of Hollywood Records artists, and the floor depicts a giant record. These digital posters sometimes displayed guests' names as recording artists, accomplished by short-range RFID scanners that read their MagicBands Also on display to guests was a small exhibit of recording instruments in the stand-by queue.

==== Pre-show ====
Guests waited outside the doors of Studio C, while different musical instruments can be heard being played in Studio B during a rehearsal next door. As guests enter Studio C, Aerosmith is working on an instrumental recording of "Walk This Way" with a sound engineer (played by Ken Marino). The band greeted the guests as their manager (played by Illeana Douglas) walked in interrupting, telling the band they are running late to a scheduled show on the other side of town. As the band got ready to depart, Steven Tyler stopped and said they cannot leave the guests behind. Joe Perry and the rest of the band agree, as the manager sarcastically replies, "Well, guys, what do you expect me to do? Send them all with you?". At this time, a cast member in the back of the pre-show room would say "How about some backstage passes?", Steven would pause and say, "Wait a minute. I love that idea!", before turning to the band's manager and requesting "How about some backstage passes?" on behalf of the guests. She reluctantly agreed and made a phone call ordering a "super stretch" limousine, calling it a "really fast car". The limousine that Aerosmith boards in the background peels out, leaving their manager behind to her disappointment. As the scene ended, "Walk This Way" resumed playing but with vocals. Guests then exited the pre-show to the queue that led to the Lock 'n' Roll parking garage, where the boarding platform was located.

The pre-show of the attraction was modified over time. One version featured band member Joe Perry asking Chris to grab his black Les Paul guitar, which prompted a cast member in the pre-show area to phyisically pick up and remove a black guitar signed by Joe Perry from the set. As a backup, and in the event that a cast member was not available to participate, the pre-show film instead had an on-screen roadie appear on the side, saying "Hey, Joe, I'll get it for ya"; this version of the pre-show remained until the last day of operation, while the physically present pre-show Chris was rarely done.

=== Walt Disney Studios Park ===
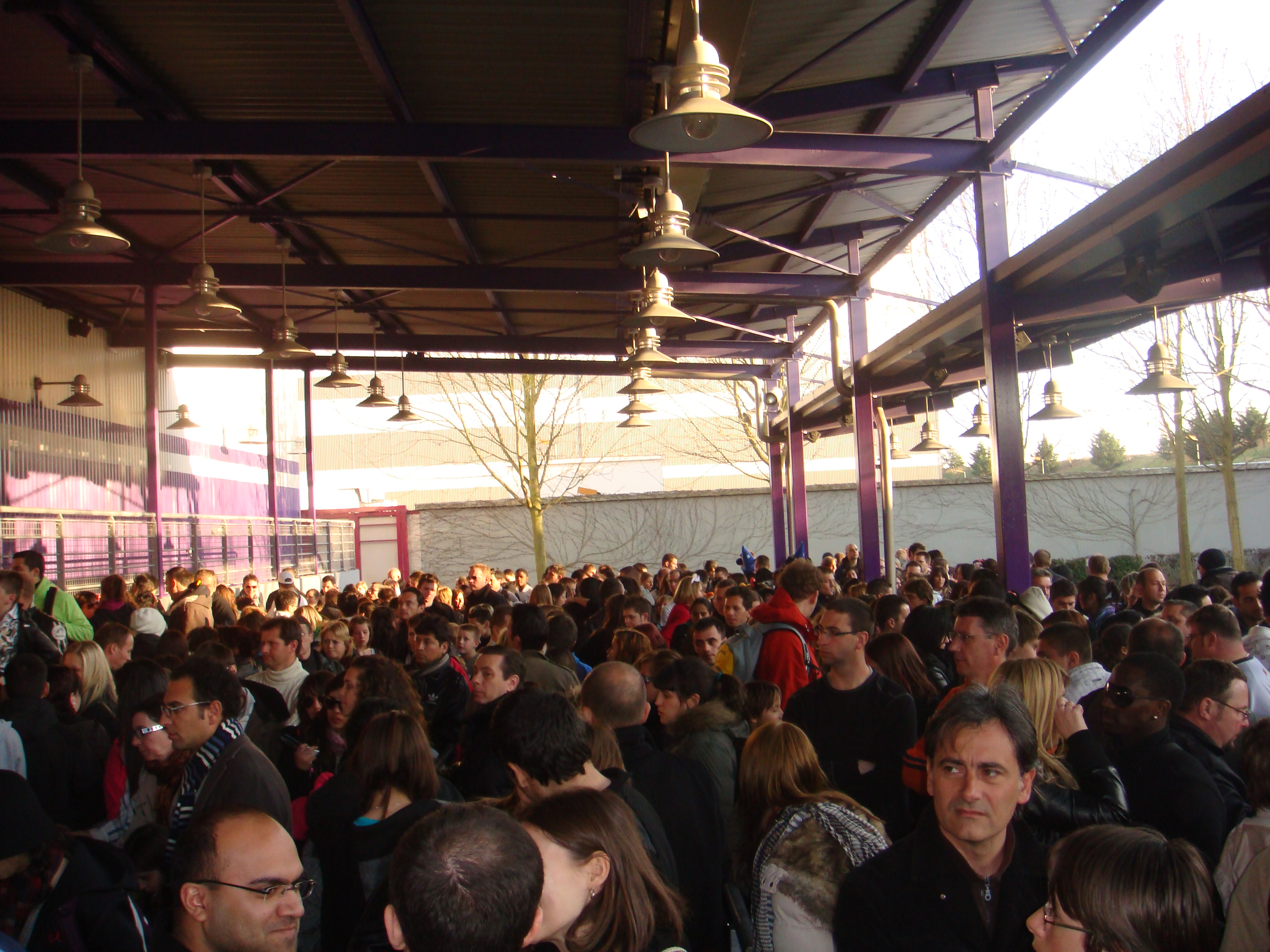
The queue line as it appeared at Walt Disney Studios Park.

In Paris, guests entered the fictional Tour de Force Records. The queue line's background music consisted of individual songs from a variety of different bands, including 3 Doors Down, Limp Bizkit, Texas, Blink-182, Creed, Korn, Coldplay, P.O.D., Linkin Park, Oasis and The Chemical Brothers. Upon entering the studio, guests were first greeted by the reception area, a circular room with the Tour de Force Records logo, guitar-shaped columns and guitars on the right wall. In the next area, guests passed by numerous concert posters and an exhibit filled with several musical items like guitars, gold records, drum heads, tambourines and jackets. The ride's storyline focused on Aerosmith, working with engineers, creating a revolutionary new music experience at the Tour De Force Records studios. After watching the pre-show which features Aerosmith's Steven Tyler hyping up the ride, guests were lured into the testing area where they boarded one of five Soundtrackers, the prototype vehicles for the new experience.

=== On-ride ===
As the limousine leaves the parking garage, Bill St. James, (Note: Former host of ABC Radio's Flashback.) the radio DJ of LA's Classic Rock Station, (Note: This role was previously voiced by Uncle Joe Benson, a well-known Los Angeles rock radio DJ.) begins a short commentary, usually followed by a traffic report in the surrounding area where Aerosmith's concert is taking place. The limousine stops in front of a highway tunnel where a highway sign flashes humorous messages like: "Traffic bug you? Then STEP on it!". In the Orlando storyline, the attraction speeds through the Los Angeles freeway, while the Paris storyline is based around an Aerosmith music video. Building up anticipation, seconds before the limousine is launched, Steven Tyler counts down from five, launching the limo from 0 to 57 mph (92 km/h) in less than 2.8 seconds at "one!". As the limousine enters the tunnel, the on-ride photo is taken and a selection of Aerosmith songs play.

After a long straightway, the limo rises up into the sea serpent element, which is a two inversion element, and then some less intense over-banked turns. During the ride, there are neon signs on the side of the track, designed to mimic road signs in the Orlando version; in the Paris version, lighting rigs, projectors, strobes, and smoke effects are used in place of the road signs. The limousine continues along the track, until it reaches the third and final inversion, a corkscrew, and ending the ride with more banked turns as well as a camelback hill. The limousine proceeds to the VIP backstage area, where guests exit through the red carpet towards the on-ride photo screens at the gift shop.

=== Soundtrack ===
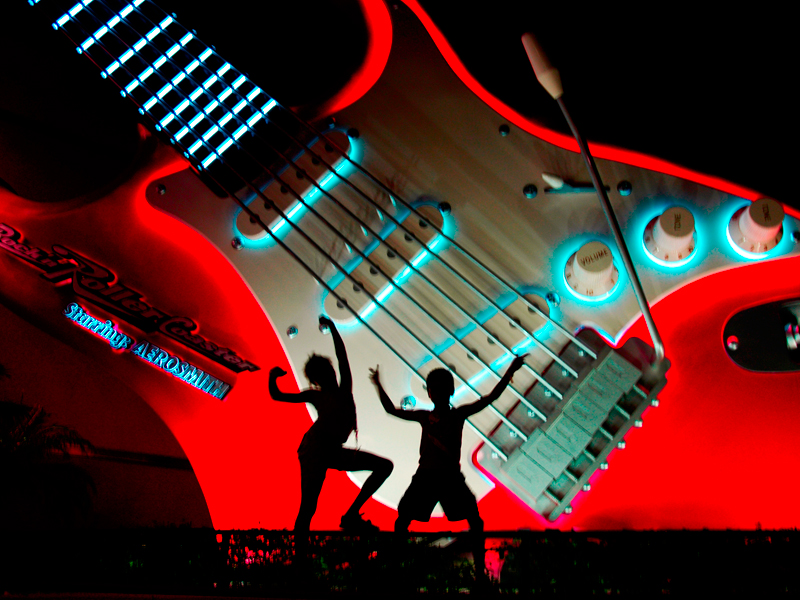
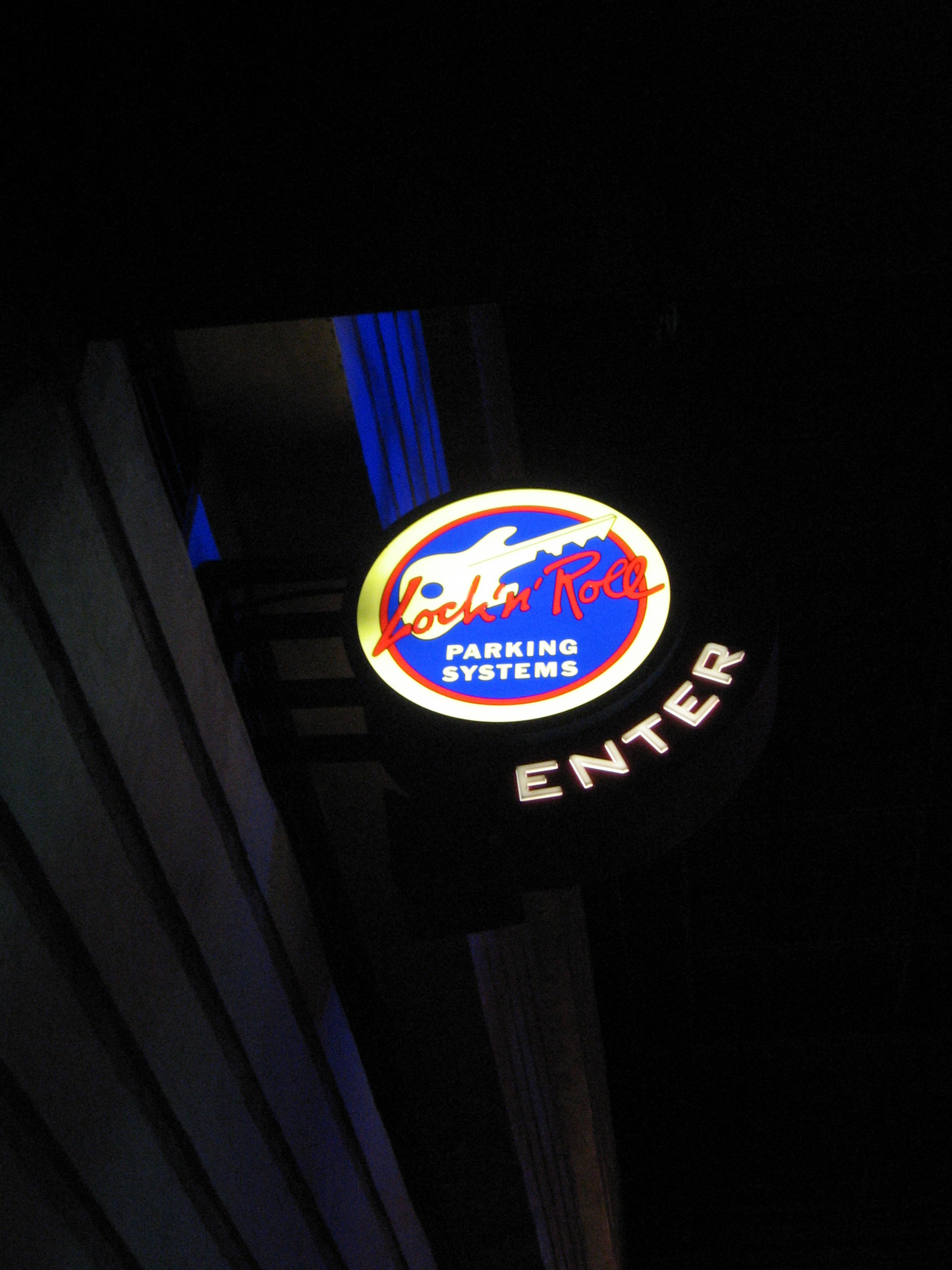
The giant red Fender Stratocaster outside of Rock 'n' Roller Coaster at night (top) and the garage sign in the ride's loading area (bottom), both pictured during the Starring Aerosmith iteration at Disney's Hollywood Studios.

==== Disney's Hollywood Studios ====
Walt Disney Imagineering worked with Aerosmith to produce a special soundtrack for the roller coaster. Each coaster train featured different songs from the band, some containing some new lyrics written specifically for the attraction; for example, "Love in an Elevator" is sung as "Love in a Rollercoaster". Each train had a license plate in the back with puns such as "one quick limo" and "hate traffic", shortened as a license plate number. The soundtrack for the ride vehicles (with license plates) included:

- "Nine Lives" (1QKLIMO)
- "Love in an Elevator" and "Walk This Way" (UGOBABE) (Note: Prior to the 2007 refurbishment, the UGOBABE license plate had been previously used as UGOGIRL.)
- "Young Lust", "F.I.N.E.*", and "Love in an Elevator" (Note: Sung as "Love in a Rollercoaster" in the last line.) (BUHBYE)
- "Back in the Saddle" and "Dude (Looks Like a Lady)" (H8TRFFC)
- "Sweet Emotion" (Note: Live version, as featured in A Little South of Sanity.) (2FAST4U)

"What Kind of Love Are You On", an unused song, was only used during testing and maintenance (sung as "What Kind of Ride Are You On" in the last line). Vehicles were rotated in and out of use after a period of many thousands of laps around the track. A sixth limo in the fleet had no license plate and was always "in refurbishment", however, the maintenance teams would switch out the plate and add the proper song to the new vehicle every time a rotation was made. Prior to the 2007 refurbishment, the UGOGIRL and BUHBYE limos had actual countdowns, before it was added to the rest of the ride vehicles, with Steven Tyler providing his voice for the countdown.

==== Walt Disney Studios Park ====
The vehicles in Paris were called "Soundtrackers" instead of limousines, each one with its own theme and corresponding song and light show:

- "Back in the Saddle" and "Dude (Looks Like a Lady)" (Green)
- "Young Lust", "F.I.N.E.*", and "Love in an Elevator" (Purple)
- "Love in an Elevator" and "Walk This Way" (Multicolored)
- "Nine Lives" (Red)
- "Sweet Emotion" (Blue)

== Ride experience (Starring The Muppets) ==
The ride's storyline follows Dr. Teeth, Animal, Floyd, Janice, Zoot, and Lips of the Electric Mayhem as they prepare to headline "their biggest Hollywood concert ever!" However, the band ends up running late to its own show while rehearsing for the performance. Meanwhile, G-Force Records, where the ride takes place, has come under new management by The Muppets with "just a little help" from Scooter's uncle J.P. Grosse, where park guests are set to receive a VIP tour of the recording studio. The exterior of the ride features a limousine in the archway, a large guitar painted with a vibrant paint job, inspired by that of the Electric Mayhem bus, with the keyboard base featuring a golden key as a nod to Dr. Teeth, and the exterior building being repainted dark gray.

Walt Disney Imagineering collaborated with The Muppets Studio to design the revamped attraction. Unlike the Aerosmith version, the Muppets version includes Audio-Animatronics in both the pre-show and unloading areas. The pre-show features an Audio-Animatronic figure of Scooter that was created to closely replicate the puppeteering performance of the real Muppet. Imagineering captured the motion performance of David Rudman operating the physical Scooter puppet and used it to program the figure's movements. The Audio-Animatronics of Statler and Waldorf and the two penguin audio engineers were repurposed from the park's former Muppet*Vision 3D attraction. Props from Muppet*Vision 3D were implemented into the queue, as well as the Muppet Mobile Lab vehicle, and clips from several Muppet films and television series.

=== Pre-show ===
The pre-show features the Electric Mayhem in the recording studio playing music, with penguins as audio engineers, and Scooter trying to convince the band to get to their show. Kermit the Frog calls the studio to ask when the band will arrive, adding that the fans have been waiting for hours. Various Muppets will appear on a TV screen as they attempt to stall the show. Suddenly, guests see an explosion with smoke, and Beaker pinned to the studio glass. Dr. Bunsen Honeydew appears on a TV screen, and tells Scooter about the Lengthy Immediate Motion Object (L.I.M.O.; pronounced as lie-moe) that can get the band to the concert. When Janice asks about all of the VIP guests, Kermit suggests giving the guests backstage passes. The doors then open and the guests enter the immediate queue.

=== On-ride ===
Guests board the L.I.M.O. in the alleyway before the ride launches from 0 to 57 mph (92 km/h) in less than 2.8 seconds, with one of five songs randomly played.

The L.I.M.O. stops in front of a U.S. Route 101 sign on a tunnel. Animal then appears above and gives the countdown. Once he yells "1", the L.I.M.O. then launches down the tunnel and into the sea serpent element, which is a two-inversion element, and then some less intense over-banked turns. During the ride, there are neon signs with various Muppets on both sides of the track, designed to mimic road signs. The L.I.M.O. then continues along the track, until it reaches the third and final inversion, a corkscrew, and ending the ride with more banked turns as well as a camelback hill. Before the L.I.M.O. reaches the unload station, Statler and Waldorf appear around the corner, making sarcastic remarks, heckling at the guests aboard the vehicle. The L.I.M.O. breaks into the VIP backstage area and unloading station, where guests exit through the red carpet to see their on-ride photo with Electric Mayhem playing their concert. A portrait of Jim Henson as a Muppet, which was repurposed from Muppet*Vision 3D, is hung above the archway located between the unload station and the gift shop exit. Guests then exit through the Rock Around the Shop gift store.

=== Soundtrack ===
The attraction's soundtrack features covers of well-known songs, which are performed by Dr. Teeth and the Electric Mayhem, featuring special guest artists in all but one song:

- "Song 2" (Blur cover)
- "Born to Be Wild", featuring Camilla the Chicken (Steppenwolf cover)
- "Love Rollercoaster", featuring Jennifer Hudson and Questlove (Ohio Players cover)
- "Rock! Rock! (Till You Drop)", featuring Def Leppard (Def Leppard cover)
- "Walking on Sunshine", featuring Kelly Clarkson (Katrina and the Waves cover)

On October 6, 2026, a Christmas overlay by The Electric Mayhem was announced for the attraction to run from November 4, 2026 to January 6, 2027, performing:

- "Little Saint Nick", featuring Michael Buble (Beach Boys cover)
- "Holiday Road", featuring Kermit the Frog and Fozzie Bear (Lindsey Buckingham cover)
- "Christmas (Baby Please Come Home)", featuring Jennifer Hudson (Darlene Love cover)
- "Silver Bells", featuring Cyndi Lauper (originally composed by Jay Livingston and Ray Evans)

=== Cast ===
- Bill Barretta as Dr. Teeth, Pepe the King Prawn, Bobo the Bear, Johnny Fiama, Rowlf the Dog, The Swedish Chef, Big Mean Carl, Howard Tubman
- Dave Goelz as Zoot, Gonzo, Dr. Bunsen Honeydew, Waldorf, Beauregard
- Eric Jacobson as Animal, Fozzie Bear, Miss Piggy, Sam Eagle, The Newsman, George the Janitor
- Peter Linz as Lips, Robin the Frog, Statler, Joe the Legal Weasel, Walter, Link Hogthrob, Nigel, Foo-Foo
- David Rudman as Scooter, Janice, Beaker
- Matt Vogel as Kermit the Frog, Floyd Pepper, Uncle Deadly, Sweetums, Lew Zealand
- Bradley Freeman, Jr. as Bean Bunny, Rizzo the Rat
- Alice Dinnean as Yolanda Rat

Additionally, Danny Trejo, Darren Criss, John Stamos, Neil Patrick Harris, Travis Barker, Yvette Nicole Brown, Wayne Brady, "Weird Al" Yankovic, Ken Marino, and Illeana Douglas make cameo appearances in the attraction.

== See also ==
- Xpress: Platform 13, an identical roller coaster at Walibi Holland
