= Arthur – The Ride =

Roller coaster at Europa-Park

ARTHUR
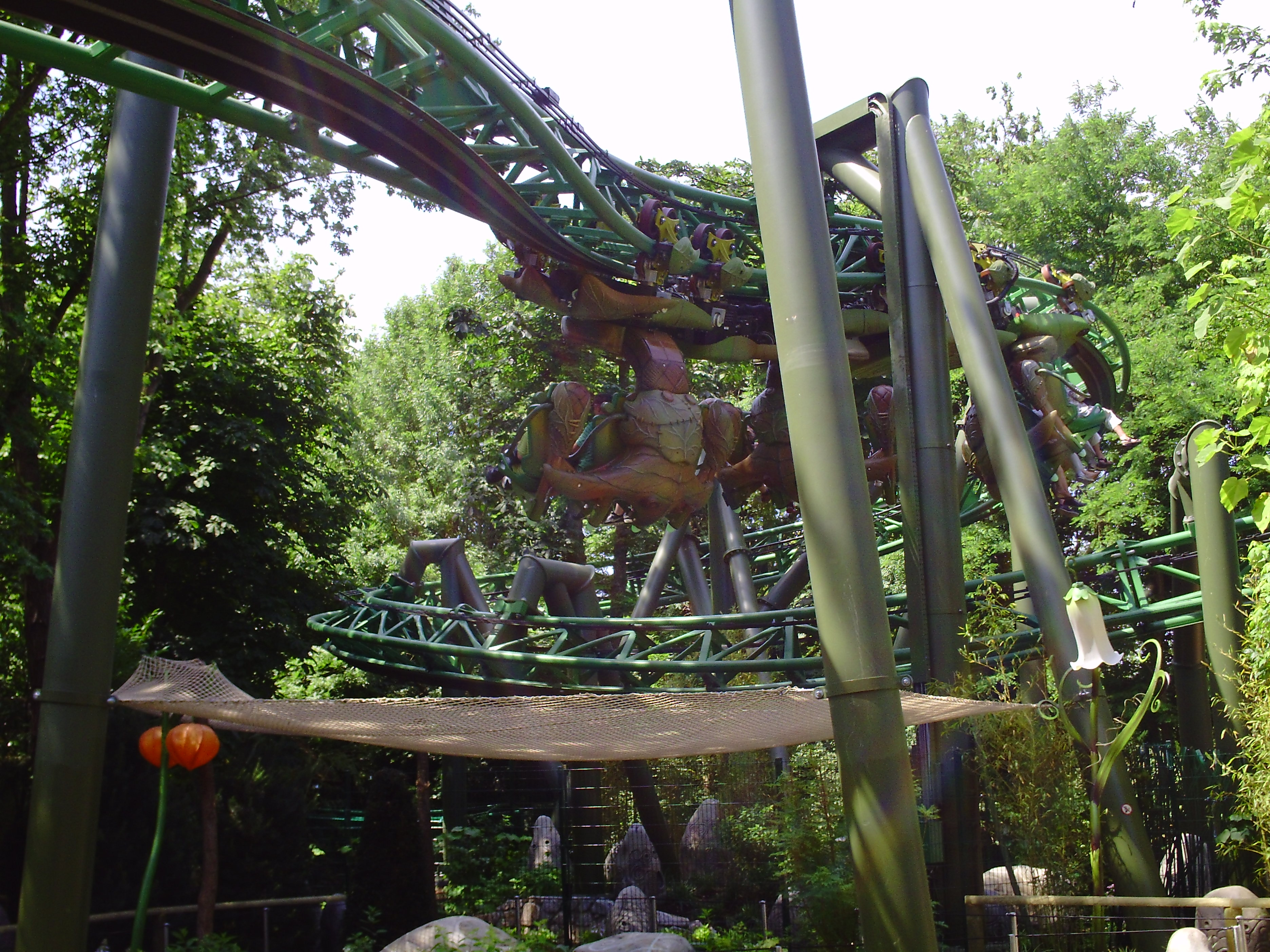
- A train in the second outdoor section

Europa-Park
- Location: Europa-Park
- Park section: ARTHUR - In the Minimoys Kingdom
- Coordinates: 48.263901°N 7.723704°E
- Status: Operating
- Opening date: July 2014
- Cost: €25 million

General statistics
- Type: Steel – Inverted – Powered
- Manufacturer: Mack Rides
- Model: Inverted Powered Coaster
- Height: 13.5 m (44 ft)
- Length: 550 m (1,800 ft)
- Speed: 31 km/h (19 mph)
- Inversions: 0
- Duration: 4:00
- Capacity: 1,600 riders per hour
- Height restriction: 100 cm (3 ft 3 in)
- Trains: 9 trains with a single car. Riders are arranged 4 across in 3 rows for a total of 12 riders per train.
- Website: Official website
- Single rider line available
- ARTHUR at RCDB

ARTHUR is an inverted-spinning dark ride roller coaster at Europa-Park in Rust, Germany. The attraction opened in spring 2014 as part of the wider "ARTHUR - In the Minimoys Kingdom" area themed after the Arthur series of books and films by Luc Besson.

== History ==
In mid-November 2012, Europa-Park announced the addition of an Arthur and the Invisibles themed area for 2014. The announcement was timed with the annual International Association of Amusement Parks and Attractions (IAAPA) Trade Show in Orlando, Florida, and detailed a dark ride and a carousel would be included in the area. Construction for the attraction began in early 2013 on a plot of land set aside for an indoor attraction in 2000. Testing for the ride was scheduled to begin in February 2014. Arthur – The Ride, along with the larger Kingdom of the Invisibles themed area, officially opened to the public in July 2014.

== Ride experience ==
The ride system behind Arthur – The Ride was developed by Mack Rides, who own Europa-Park, making it the first inverted coaster produced by a company other than Bolliger & Mabillard, Intamin, or Vekoma. Riders are suspended beneath the steel roller coaster track in one of nine, 12-person vehicles. The 550-metre-long (1,800 ft) attraction features a theoretical hourly capacity of 1,600 riders. The ride features seven scenes both inside and outside the show building. Unlike most roller coasters, Arthur – The Ride does not require gravity for movement, instead it is powered by motors inside the trains. It begins with a spiral lift hill. The ride features animatronics by Life Formations and Heimotion, as well as other 4D effects such as water, wind and scents.

== Themed area ==
Arthur – The Ride is one of several attractions within the Kingdom of the Invisibles themed area. The area spans 3,500 square metres (38,000 sq ft), beneath a 15-metre-tall (49 ft) dome and encompass an island, two streams and an enchanted forest. Theming inside the area was developed by P&P Projects, Neverland Decors, TAA and AAB. This theming is proportionately oversized, such that a guest feels like they are the size of an ant. Other attractions within the area include Poppy Tower, a 10-metre (33 ft) family drop tower by Zierer; Mul-Mul, a Jump Around by Zamperla; and a playground with slides by Atlantics GmbH. The area also features food, beverage, and retail outlets.

== Reception ==
Brady MacDonald of the Los Angeles Times ranked the attraction as number 8 on his top 14 most anticipated attractions for 2014.

== See also ==
- 2014 in amusement parks
