= Tiger Express (roller coaster) =

Roller coaster in France

- Previously known as Flying Dutchman Gold Mine at Six Flags Holland/Walibi World (2000–2010)
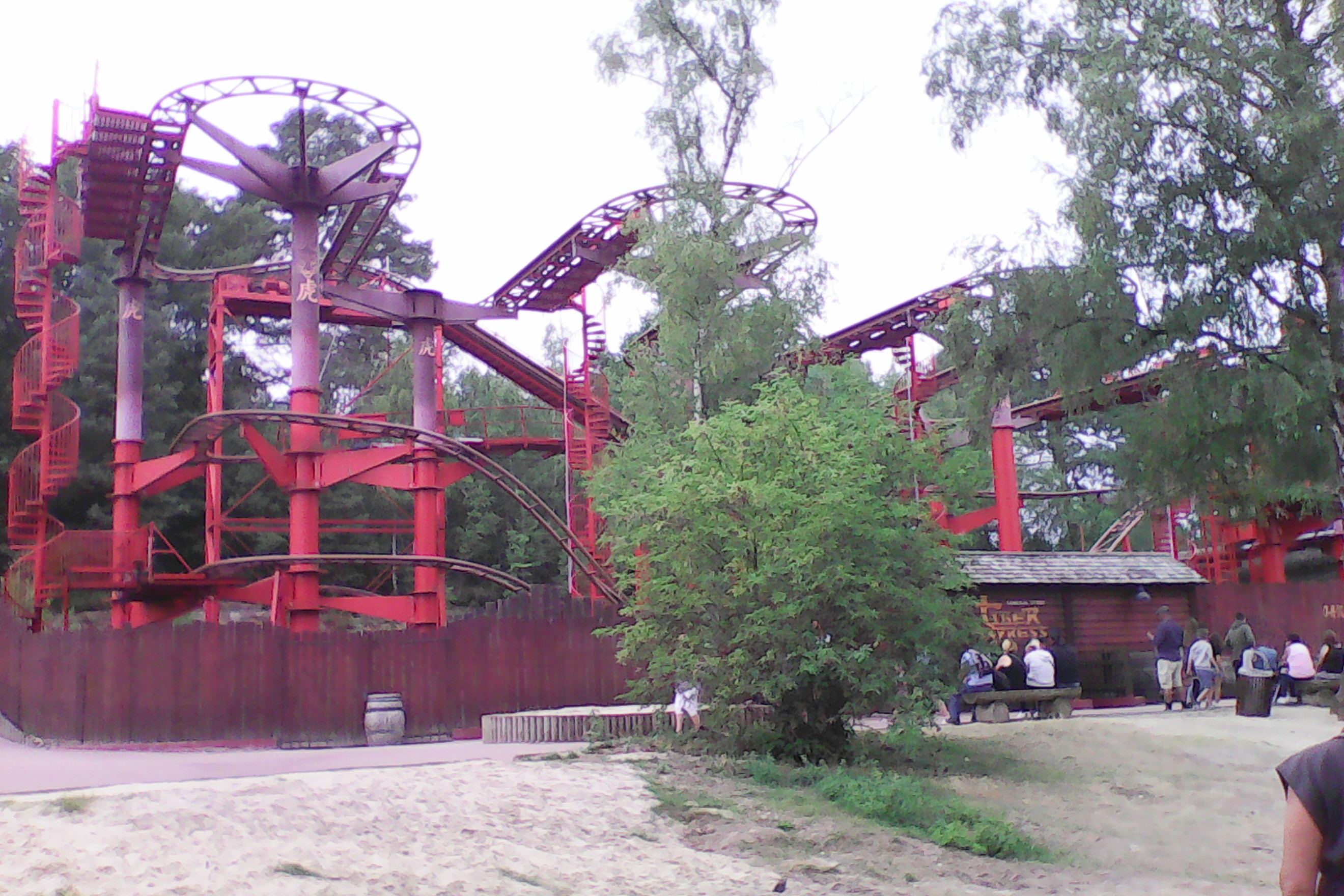
- Tiger Express at La Mer de sable

Mer de Sable
- Coordinates: 49.145301°N 2.673229°E
- Status: Operating
- Opening date: June 26, 2011

Walibi Holland
- Coordinates: 52.440°N 5.763°E
- Status: Removed
- Opening date: 2000
- Closing date: 2010

General statistics
- Type: Steel – Wild Mouse
- Manufacturer: Mack Rides
- Model: Wild Mouse (compact park)
- Track layout: Wild Mouse
- Height: 14 m (46 ft)
- Length: 370 m (1,210 ft)
- Speed: 45 km/h (28 mph)
- Inversions: 0
- Duration: 1:25
- Capacity: 1120 riders per hour
- Trains: 10 trains with a single car. Riders are arranged 2 across in 2 rows for a total of 4 riders per train.
- Tiger Express at RCDB

Tiger Express is a steel wild mouse roller coaster located at La Mer de Sable in France. From 2000 until late 2010, the roller coaster was located in Walibi World in the Netherlands under the name Flying Dutchman Gold Mine.

== See also ==
The ride when it was Flying Dutchman Gold Mine

- 2011 in amusement parks
