= Cosmic Coaster (Worlds of Fun) =

Roller coaster at Worlds of Fun

- Previously known as Wacky Worm (1993–2011)

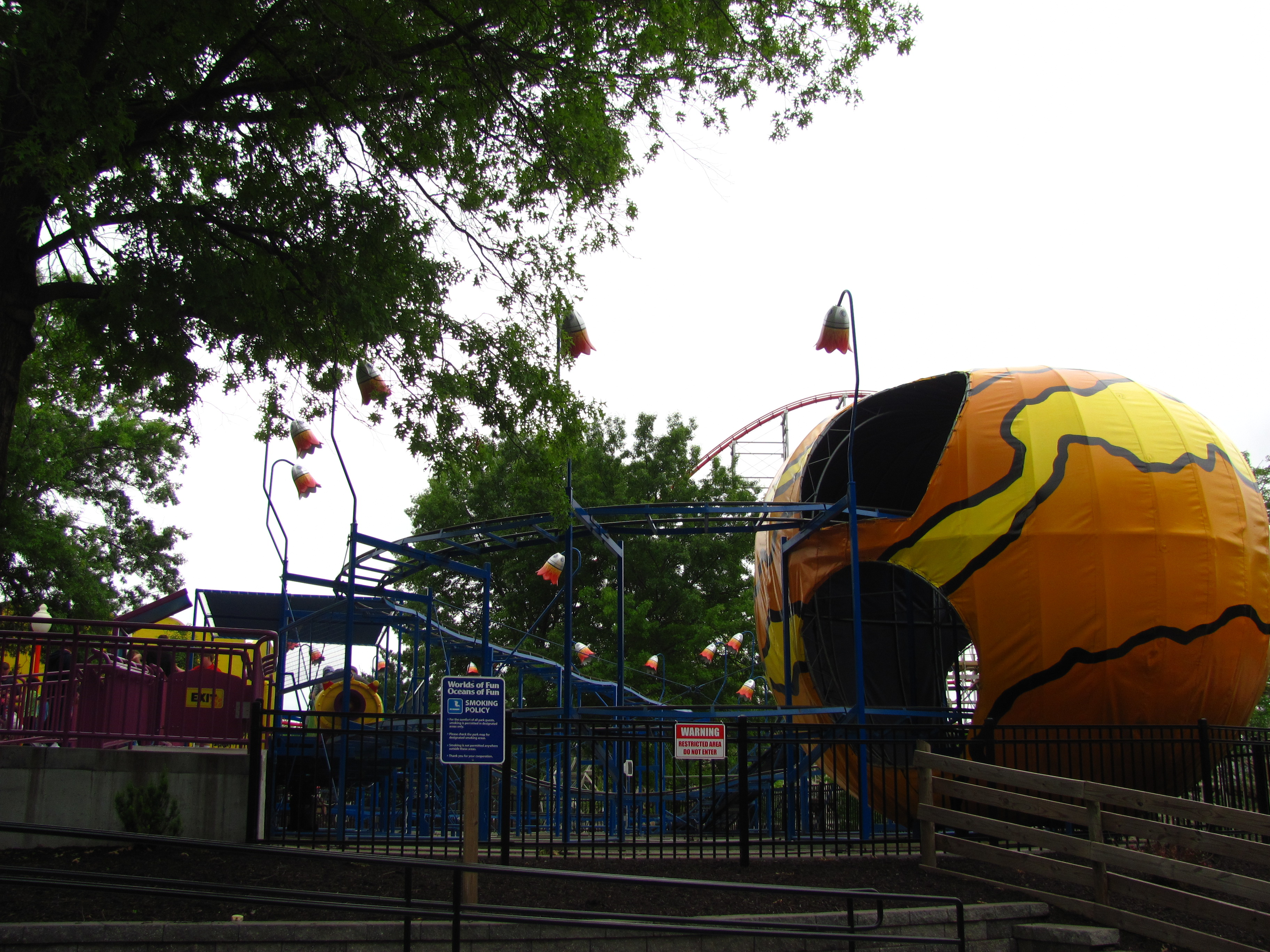

Worlds of Fun
- Location: Worlds of Fun
- Park section: Planet Snoopy
- Coordinates: 39.172277°N 94.488903°W
- Status: Removed
- Opening date: April 3, 1993
- Closing date: 2026

General statistics
- Type: Steel – Junior
- Manufacturer: Preston & Barbieri
- Model: Wacky Worm
- Height: 15 ft (4.6 m)
- Length: 444 ft (135 m)
- Inversions: 0
- Duration: 0:55
- Trains: Single train with 6 cars; riders arranged 2 across in 2 rows for a total of 24 riders per train
- Cosmic Coaster at RCDB

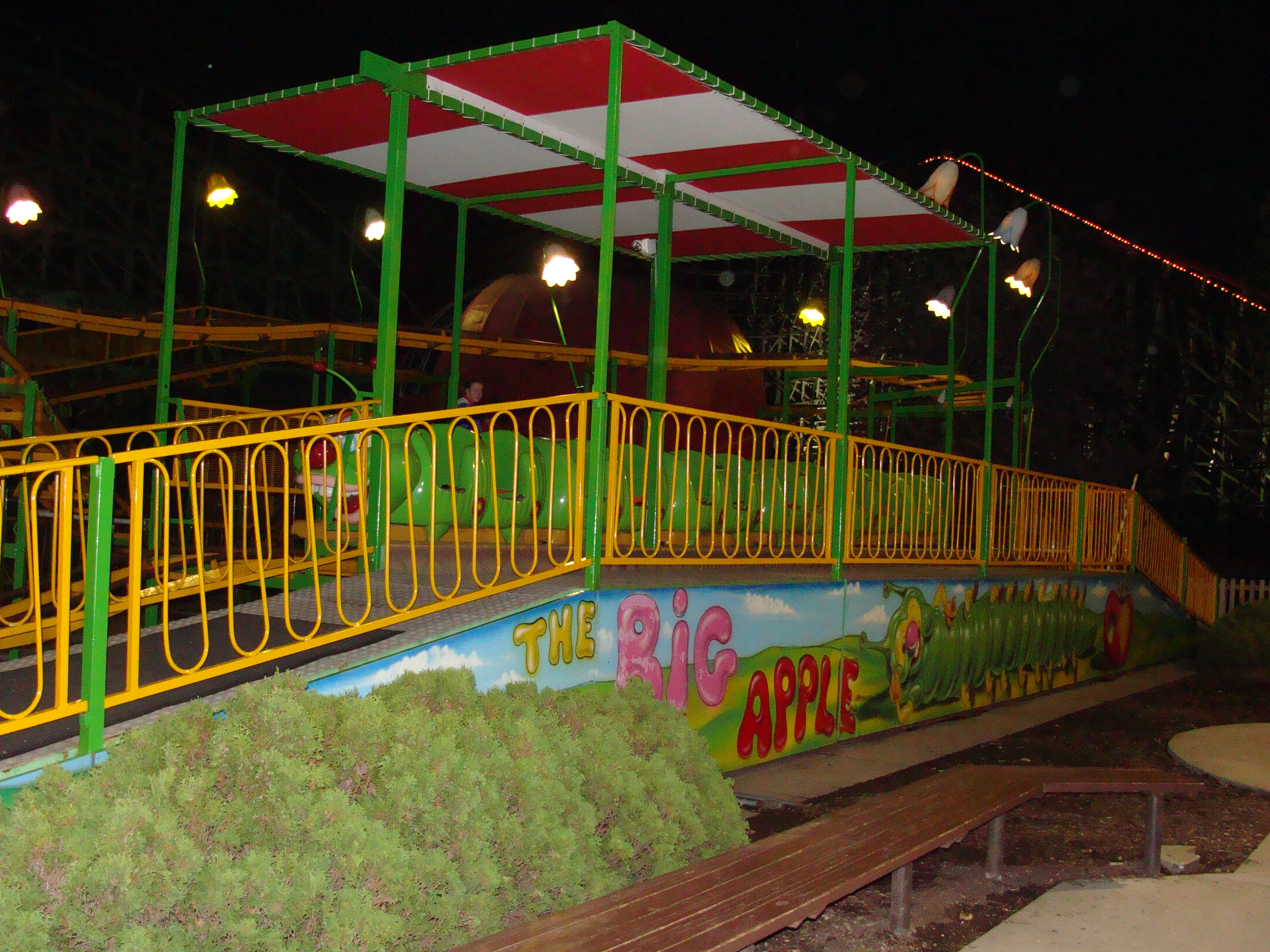
The ride's station when it was known as Wacky Worm

Cosmic Coaster was a junior roller coaster at Worlds of Fun. Introduced in 1993 as Wacky Worm, the ride was later re-themed to feature Snoopy and relocated to the park's Planet Snoopy section. It was removed June 2026.

== History ==
Cosmic Coaster at Worlds of Fun first opened in the Americana section of the park in 1993 as Wacky Worm and was manufactured by Preston & Barbieri. The area where Wacky Worm was located became Camp Snoopy in 2001 and later remodeled into Planet Snoopy in 2011. In 2012, Wacky Worm was moved within Planet Snoopy and received a new name and theme as Cosmic Coaster as part of an investment in overall general park improvements that year. It is located in the space previously occupied by the Woodstock Express kiddie train. The Cosmic Coaster was dismantled and removed from the park in June 2026.

== See also ==
- 2012 in amusement parks
