= Sofia Land =

Former amusement park in Sofia, Bulgaria

Sofia Land София Ленд
- Location: Sofia, Bulgaria
- Coordinates: 42°40′4″N 23°19′49″E
- Opened: 21 September 2002
- Closed: 16 October 2006
- Area: 35,000 square metres (380,000 sq ft)

Attractions
- Total: 23

Sofia Land (София Ленд) was an amusement park in Sofia, the capital of Bulgaria. It was the first true amusement park in the country, as well as one of the largest in Southeastern Europe, and was situated on an area of 35,000 square metres (380,000 sq ft) in a park close to Sofia Zoo. Construction of the main building began in July 2001 and the park was opened on 21 September 2002.

Sofia Land featured 4 extreme, 8 children's and 11 all-age rides and attractions, a number of bars, restaurants, coffeehouses, clubs, a bowling alley under the park itself, and a gaming station with PlayStation 2 and other games below. There were also many shops and several cinema halls situated in the park's main building, which resembled a castle.

In September 2006, plans to change the owner and close the park were announced. The park was officially closed down on October 16 of the same year.

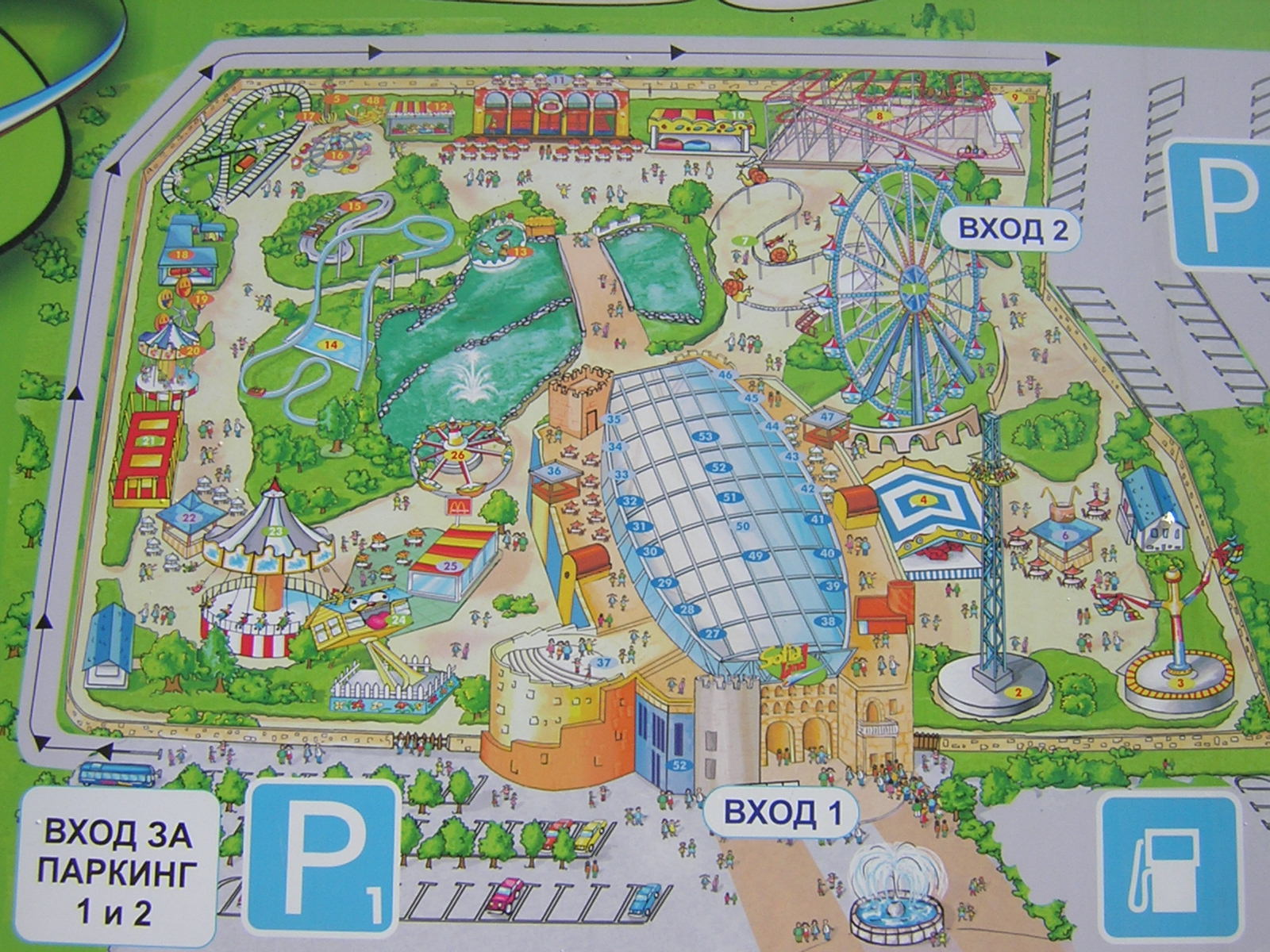
Map of Sofia Land

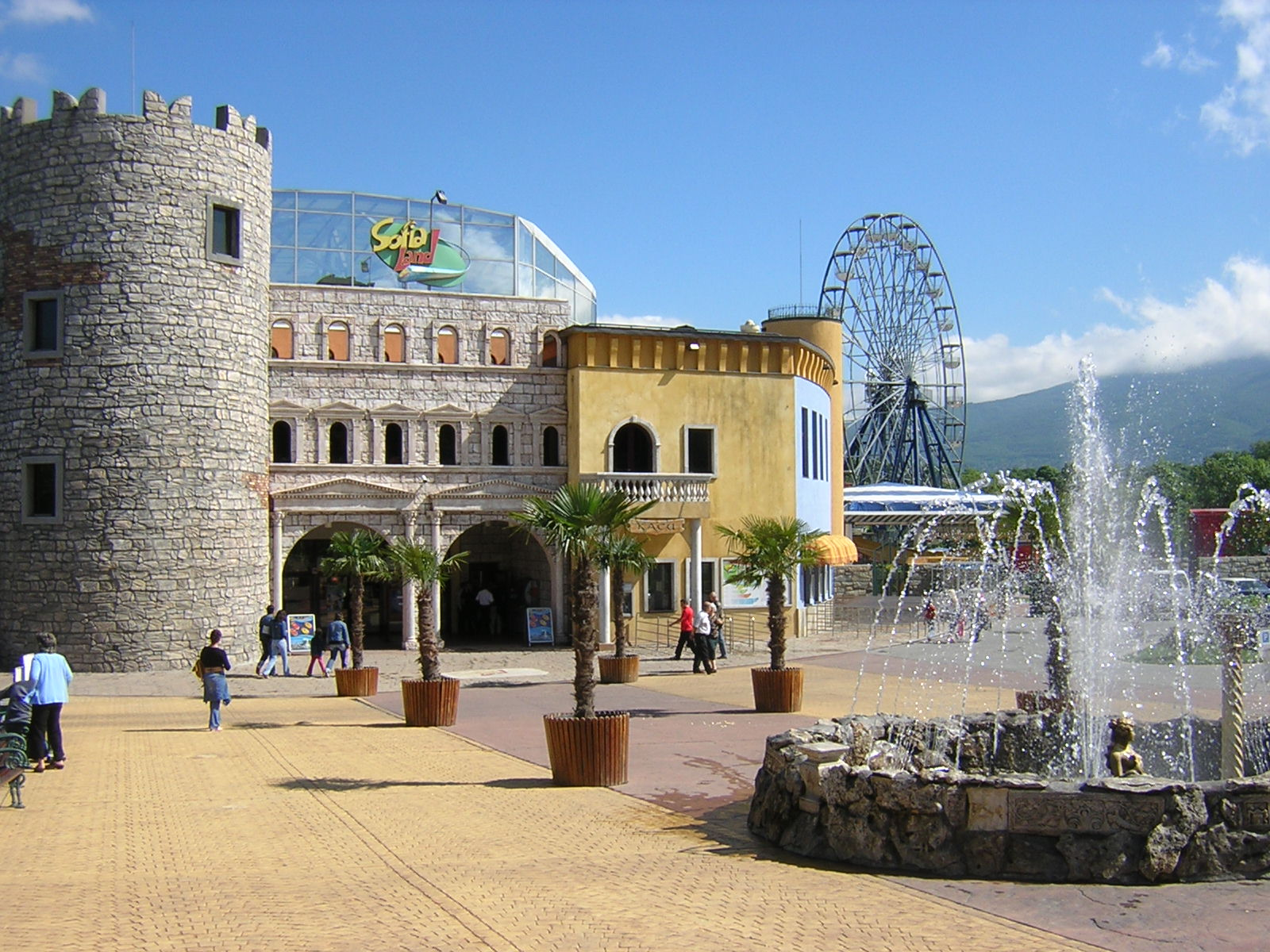
The main entrance to Sofia Land
