= Speed of Sound (roller coaster) =

Steel Boomerang roller coaster

- Previously known as La Via Volta (2000-2010)
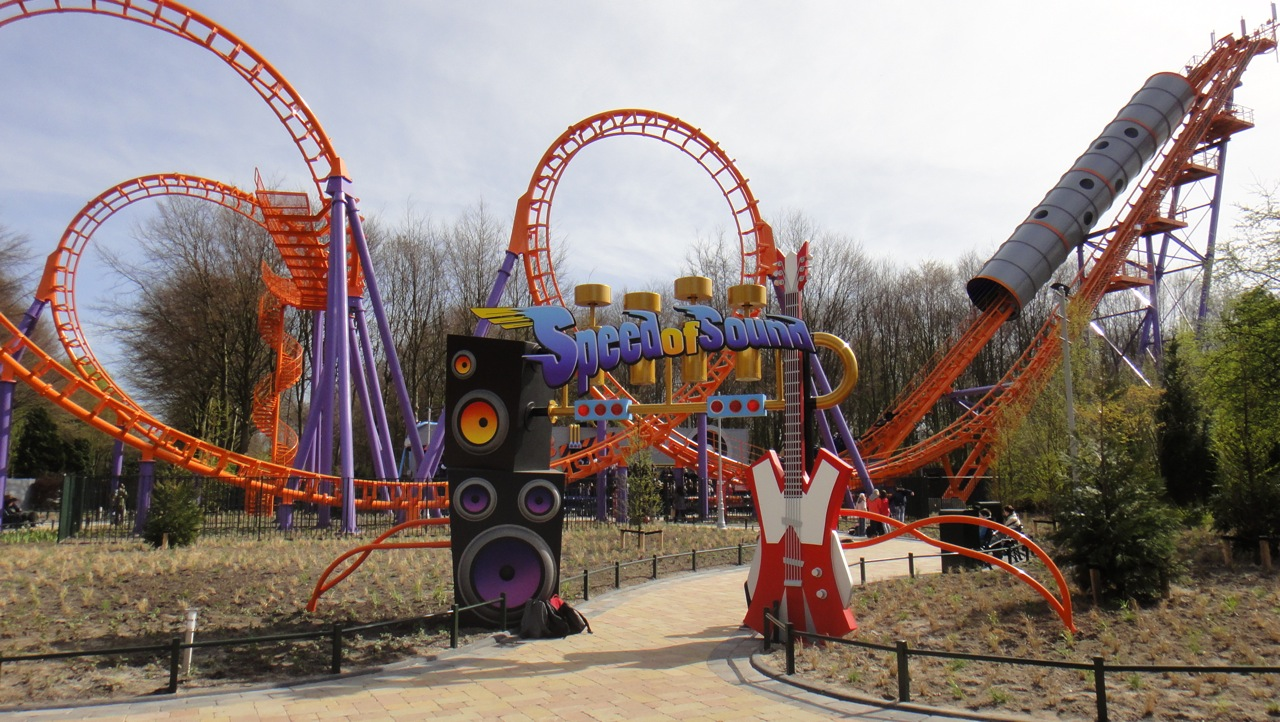

Walibi Holland
- Location: Walibi Holland
- Park section: Play Ground
- Coordinates: 52.440630°N 5.768123°E
- Status: Operating
- Opening date: April 22, 2000

General statistics
- Type: Steel – Shuttle – Boomerang
- Manufacturer: Vekoma
- Designer: Vekoma
- Model: Boomerang
- Lift/launch system: Chain Lift Hill
- Height: 116.5 ft (35.5 m)
- Length: 935 ft (285 m)
- Speed: 47 mph (76 km/h)
- Inversions: 3 inversions. Each completed both forwards and backwards.
- Duration: 1:48
- Max vertical angle: 56°
- Capacity: 760 riders per hour
- G-force: 5.2
- Height restriction: 48 in (122 cm)
- Trains: Single train with 7 cars. Riders are arranged 2 across in 2 rows for a total of 28 riders per train.
- Fast Lane available
- Single rider line available
- Speed of Sound at RCDB

Speed of Sound is a steel Boomerang roller coaster in Walibi Holland. It was manufactured by Vekoma and opened on April 22, 2000 as La Via Volta. It was open until 2007 when the park announced it would be shut down. That year, the train was sold to Pleasurewood Hills in England and now operates on Wipeout and the track remained in place at Walibi World. On 30 January, Walibi Holland announced that the La Via Volta will reopen in 2011, with a new style train from Vekoma under the name of Speed of Sound. P&P Projects was responsible for the design and build of this new attraction. Walibi Holland announced that it held a competition to win tickets for the opening of the roller coaster on April 6, 2011

== Ride experience ==
Once riders have boarded and the train cleared for dispatch, it is dragged backwards out of the station by a catch car to the top of a hill in an enclosed tube, before being released and passing back through the station and through the three inversion elements. At the other end, it is raised up a lift hill before being released to travel backwards along the same track. Block brakes in the station reduce its speed, with the train passing through and rising slightly up the first hill, before rolling back to the station where it is brought to a full stop before being driven to the dispatch position and unloaded.

A synchronized on-board music track plays through speakers in the cars.
