= Aquatopia (Antwerp) =

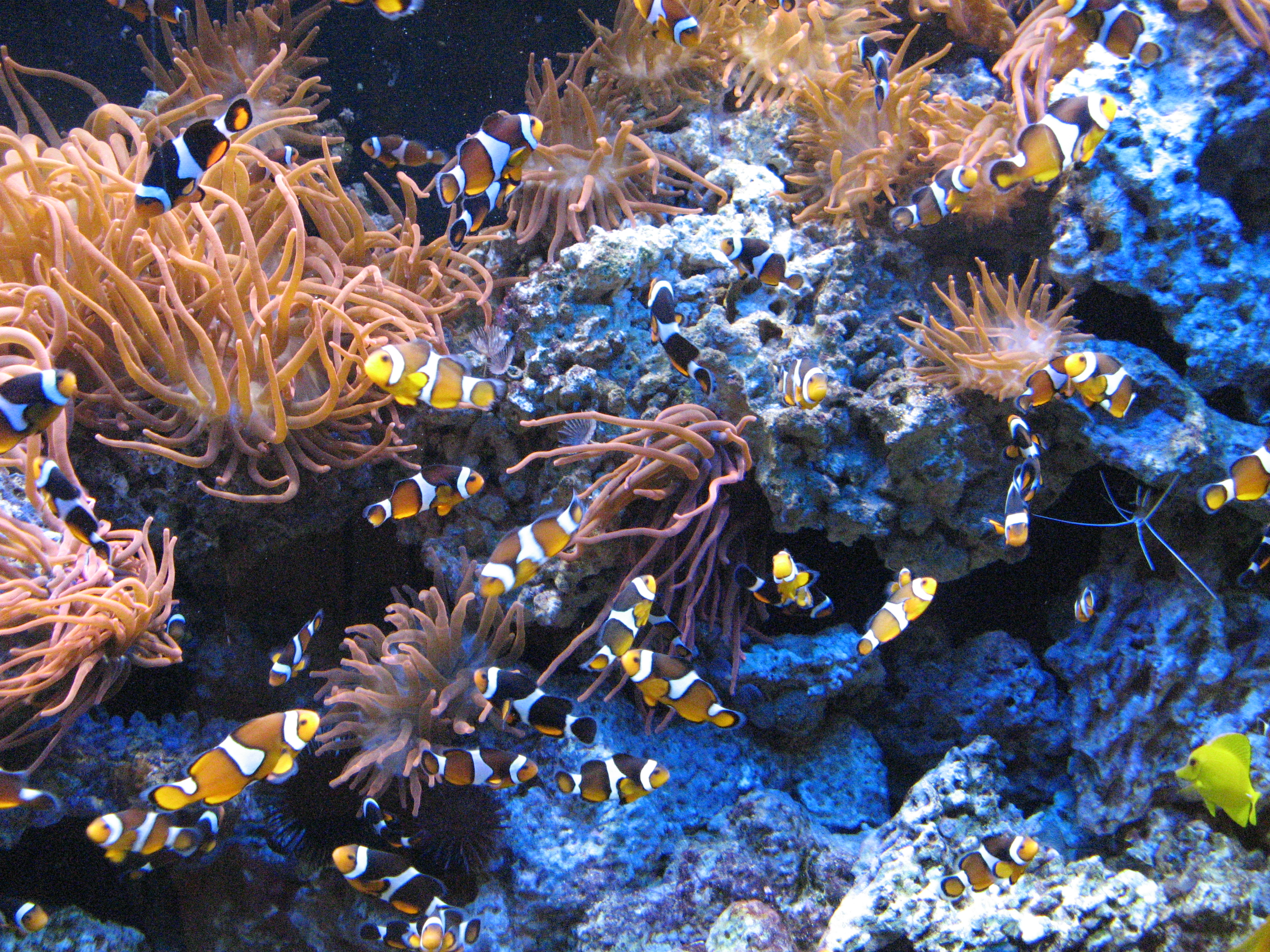
- Clownfishes in Aquatopia
- Interactive map of Aquatopia
- 51°13′9″N 4°25′16″E
- Date opened: 1 October 2003
- Date closed: 8 January 2017
- Location: Antwerp, Belgium
- No. of animals: 4,000
- No. of species: 100
- Total volume of tanks: 1,000,000 litres (220,000 imp gal; 260,000 US gal)

Aquatopia was a popular educational attraction in central Antwerp, Belgium. It used to feature a set of aquariums, along with recreations of other marine habitats, including swamps, rain forests, river deltas, and coral reefs. Aquatopia also included a number of special exhibits covering sharks, nautilus, and mysteries of the deep. The multi-story attraction was located on Koningin Astridplein, opposite Antwerpen-Centraal railway station. It had 1,000,000 litres (220,000 imp gal; 260,000 US gal) of water.

== History ==
Aquatopia opened to the public on October 1, 2003. Over 8,000 people visited the aquarium in the weeks following its opening. Within a year, Aquatopia had received an expansion. At its peak, the aquarium housed approximately 4,000 individual animals of 100 different species.

In the summer of 2015, Aquatopia was acquired by new owners. The new owners did not have an interest in maintaining the aquarium, preferring to invest in their other assets. In addition, Aquatopia had been losing visitors. It was decided to close the aquarium. The majority of the animals were sent to the nearby Antwerp Zoo, but some were sent to facilities in other parts of Europe. Aquatopia closed on January 8, 2017.
