= Walibi Holland =

Theme park in Biddinghuizen, Netherlands

- Previously known as Walibi World (2005–2010); Six Flags Holland (2000–2004); Walibi Flevo (1994–1999)
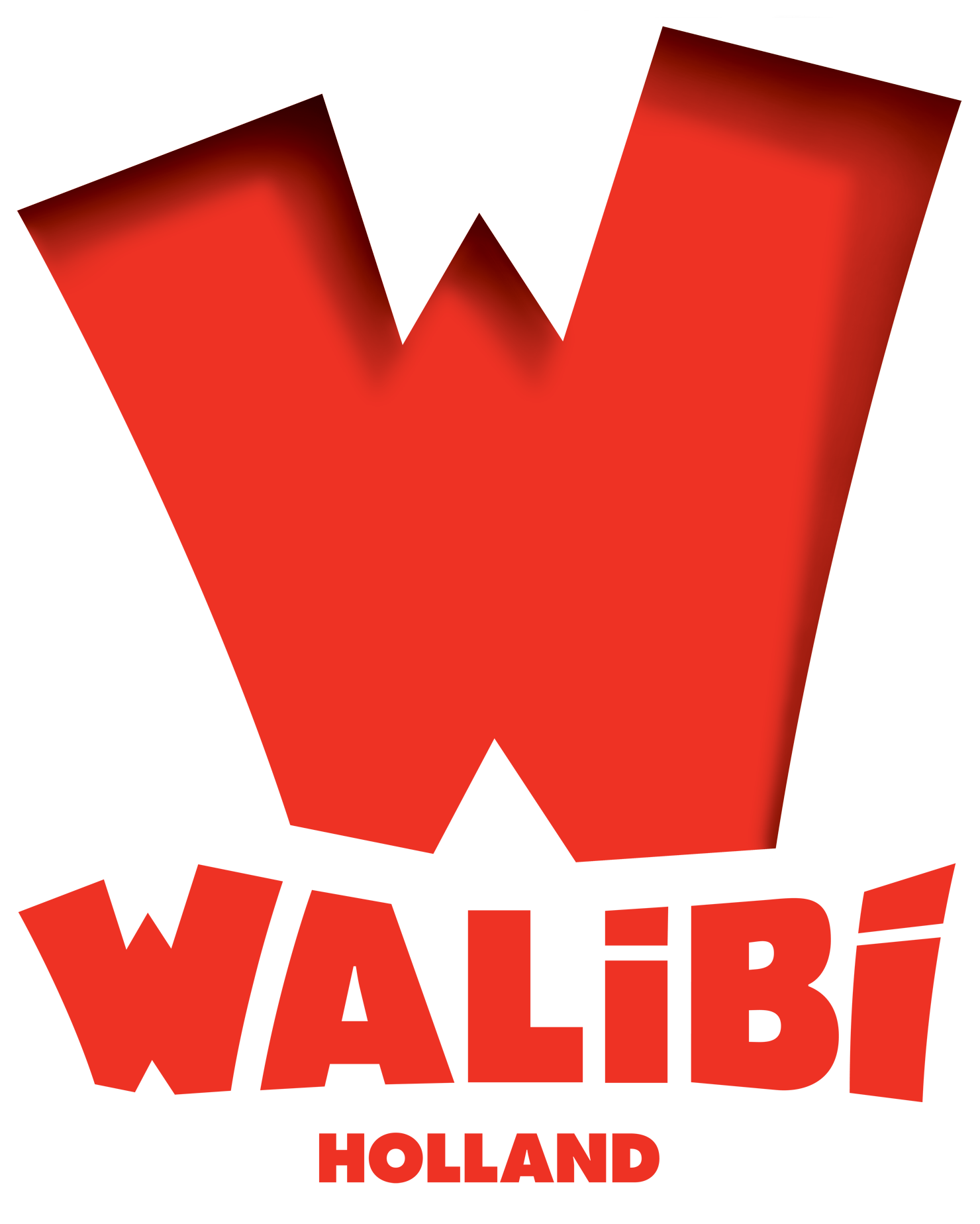
- Interactive map of Walibi Holland
- Location: Biddinghuizen, Flevoland, Netherlands
- Coordinates: 52°26′24″N 5°45′45″E
- Opened: May 21, 1971
- Owner: Compagnie des Alpes
- Slogan: #Hardgaan (2014-2016, 2018-present), Dare to get Real (2017)
- Operating season: April - October

Attractions
- Total: 37
- Roller coasters: 10
- Water rides: 3
- Website: Official website

Walibi Holland (previously called Walibi Flevo, Six Flags Holland and Walibi World) is a theme park in Biddinghuizen, Netherlands.

== History ==
The park was opened in 1971 as 'Flevohof'. It was an educational theme park themed after agriculture and farming. Having struggled to compete with more modern family attractions, Flevohof went bankrupt in 1993, and was subsequently purchased by the Walibi Group that autumn, who redeveloped the site as an amusement park. After a major winter-long programme of reconstruction the park reopened as Walibi Flevo on 7 May 1994, featuring the world's first Vekoma suspended looping coaster (SLC), El Condor. The park also adopted Walibi, the wallaby mascot of its sister park, Walibi Wavre in Belgium created in 1975 by Eddy Meeùs, a Belgian businessman. The spelling 'Walibi', incidentally, is derived from the first two letters of then three towns (now merged) near the original park put together to form a single word: Wavre - Limal - Bierges).

The Walibi parks, including Bellewaerde in Belgium, were purchased by Premier Parks Inc. in 1998, who subsequently overhauled the Flevo park, removing the 'Walibi' branding and building thirty new attractions as part of its transformation into Six Flags Holland in 2000. Six Flags's nominal expansion into Europe saw a similar refurbishment of the Belgian Walibi theme park, which was renamed to Six Flags Belgium. Both parks benefiting from the group's rights to use Warner Bros. characters within them, leading to the creation of a Looney Tunes-themed area and a powered-launch coaster themed around popular comic figure Superman, later changed to the Xpress.

In 2004, Six Flags Holland and its sister parks were purchased by financiers Palamon Capital Partners, who grouped the attractions under the name "StarParks". The park reverted to Walibi branding in 2005; numerous attractions having been rebranded as the sale of the parks also meant the loss of any references to Looney Tunes and DC Comics characters rights.

In the second half of 2006, the parks were sold for the second time in as many years to the French group Grévin & Cie (Compagnie des Alpes), most notably the operators of the French themed resort Parc Astérix, who also purchased two other Dutch attractions - the Dolfinarium Harderwijk and Avonturenpark Hellendoorn. In 2011, the park was renamed as Walibi Holland, which introduced new mascots.

The adjacent associated event grounds were originally developed with Scouting Nederland for the EuroJam 1994 and the 18th World Scout Jamboree in 1995. It is or has been the location of many festivals such as the Lowlands music festival and the Defqon.1 music festival.

== Attractions ==
=== Present rides ===
==== Roller coasters ====
Name	Opened	Photo	Manufacturer	Type	Area	Notes
Drako	1992		Zierer	Family roller coaster	Zero Zone	Rattlesnake (2011-2013); Wok's Waanzin (2005-2010); Road Runner Express (2000-2004); Keverbaan (1992-1999)
Condor	1994		Vekoma	Inverted roller coaster	Exotic	El Condor (1994-2013)
Speed of Sound	2000		Vekoma	Boomerang	Play Ground	La Via Volta (2000-2007)
Xpress: Platform 13	2000		Vekoma	Launched roller coaster	Main Street	Xpress (2005-2013); Superman The Ride (2000-2004); Clone of Rock N' Roller Coaster at Disney's Hollywood Studios
Goliath	2002		Intamin	Mega Coaster	Speed Zone	
Lost Gravity	2016		Mack Rides	Big Dipper	Zero Zone	
Untamed	2019		Rocky Mountain Construction	Hybrid roller coaster	Wilderness	RMC conversion of Robin Hood (2000-2018)
Eat My Dust	2023		Zamperla	Junior Coaster J2SK 200m	Speed Zone - Offroad	
YOY Chill	2025		Rocky Mountain Construction	Single-rail roller coaster	YOY	Two tracks, one family oriented, and one thrill oriented with 6 inversions
YOY Thrill	2025		Rocky Mountain Construction	Single-rail roller coaster	YOY	Two tracks, one family oriented, and one thrill oriented with 6 inversions

==== Thrill rides ====
Name	Opened	Photo	Manufacturer	Type	Area	Notes
Blast	2000		HUSS	Top Spin	Wilderness	Excalibur (2000-2018)
G-Force	1998		HUSS	Enterprise	Speed Zone	
Space Shot	1998		S&S Worldwide	Space Shot Tower	Speed Zone	
Skydiver	2002		FunTime	Skydiver	Wilderness	
The Tomahawk	2000		SBF Visa	Dance Party	Zero Zone	

==== Water rides ====
Name	Opened	Photo	Manufacturer	Type	Area
Crazy River	1994		Mack Rides	Log Flume	Zero Zone
El Rio Grande	1994		Vekoma	River Rapids	Exotic
Splash Battle	2005		Preston & Barbieri	Interactive Boat Ride	Play Ground

==== Family rides ====
Name	Opened	Photo	Manufacturer	Type	Area	Notes
La Grande Roue	2000		Vekoma	Ferris wheel	Main Street	
Le Tour des Jardins	2000		Chance Rides	Vintage car ride	Main Street	
Los Sombreros	1994		Sorani & Moser	Mexican Fiesta	Exotic	
Merlin's Magic Castle	2000		Vekoma	Madhouse	Wilderness	
Pavillon de Thé	2000		Chance Rides	Teacups	Main Street	
Spinning Vibe	2000		HUSS	Magic	Play Ground	Il Gladiatore (2000-2010)
Super Swing	1992		Zierer	Swing ride	Play Ground	Piccolini (2000-2010); Wave Swinger (1992-1999)
Tequila Taxi's	2000		SBF Visa	Bumper cars	Exotic	Speedy's Taxis (2000-2004)
Walibi Express	1994		Chance Rides	Miniature railway	Play Ground / Zero Zone	Six Flags Express (2000-2004); Walibi Express (1994-1999); Flevohof Train (19??-1992)

==== Kids attractions ====
Name	Opened	Photo	Manufacturer	Type	Area	Notes
Bubble Swirl	2000		SBF Visa	Balloon ride	Walibi Play Land	Fibi's Bubble Swirl (2011-2025) Spotted Bubbles (2005-2010); Elmer's Weather Balloons (2000-2004)
Cooldown	?		?	Water fountain	Speed Zone - Offroad	
Garage	2000		SBF Visa	Truck ride	Walibi Play Land	Haaz' Garage (2011-2025) Rocky's Trucks (2005-2010); Bugs Bunny's Trucking Company (2000-2004)
Merrie Go'Round	1992		SBF Visa	Merrie-go-round	Play Ground	Cavalli Barocca (2000-2010); Galopant (1992-1999)
Mini Taxi's	2000		SBF Visa	Bumper cars	Exotic	
Space Kidz	2000		SBF Visa	Junior Drop Tower	Speed Zone	Oscar's Treehouse (2005-2007) Tweety's Tweehouse (2000-2004)
Stunt Flight	1994		SBF Visa	Red Baron	Walibi Play Land	Squad's Stunt Flight (2011-2025) Joe's Stunt Kite (2005-2010); Yosemite Sam's Flight School (2000-2004); Red Baron (1994-1999)
Walibi's Fun Recorder	2000		SBF Visa	Mini teacups	Walibi Play Land	Koa's Komische Carts (2005-2010); Taz's Traffic Jam (2000-2004)
Walibi's Shuttle	2000		SBF Visa	Flying Coach	Walibi Play Land	Zenko's Graffiti Shuttle (2011-2025) Lollige Lily (2005-2010); Daffy's Crazy Bus (2000-2004)
Walibi's World Tour	2000		SBF Visa	Train ride	Walibi Play Land	W.A.B World Tour (2011-2025) Horn (2005-2010); Looney Toones Tooter (2000-2004)
Wind Seekers	2023		Zamperla	Magic Bikes	Speed Zone - Offroad	

=== Former rides / attractions ===
Name	Opened	Closed	Photo	Manufacturer	Type	Notes
Aqua Gusto	2009	2012		?	Water playground	Replaced by Aztec
Aztec	2000	2008		HUSS	Rainbow	Demolished due to an incident of the Rainbow in Liseberg and sold to a park in Iraq. Replaced by Aqua Gusto.
Boris Klauter Island	2005	2010		?	Playground	
Club Psyke: 5D Experience	2012	2016		?	5D cinema	Replaced by NeuroGen
Double Inverter	2000	2004		Chance Rides	Double Inverter	Moved to Walibi Rhone Alps
El Toro	2000	2006		HUSS	Breakdance	Moved to Bellewaerde
Flying Dutchman Gold Mine	2000	2010		Mack Rides	Wild Mouse	Moved to La Mer de Sable as Tiger Express
Hudson Bay	1994	2015		Fabbri Group	Pirate ship	Replaced by Lost Gravity
Kart Fight	2000	2018		?	Go Kart Track	Formerly known as Red Bull Kart Fight Exhibition Track (2015-2017) and Race Way Go Karting (2000-2014). Demolished in 2021. Replaced by Eat my Dust and Wind Seekers
Kids Kartbaan	2000	2016		?	Go Kart Track	
Kids Playground	2005	2013		Soft Play	Petanque	Formerly known as Boris Factory Balls (2005-2010)
Les Petits Chevaux	2000	2014		Wood Design	Carousel	
NeuroGen	2017	2022		I-MOR B.V. Quince	VR attraction	Closed during the COVID-19 pandemic
Niagara Falls	1992	1999		Van Egdom	Water slide	Formerly known as Aquachute (1992). Moved to Walibi Rhône-Alpes as Surf Music.
Robin Hood	2000	2018		Vekoma	Wooden Coaster	Replaced by Untamed
Safari	1982?	1999		?	Whirlgig	
Sherwood's Revenge	1995	2006		HUSS	Tri-Star	Moved to La Mer de Sable as Peroke
Slippery Mountain	1994	1999		?	Slide	
Tequila Ride	1994	1999		Metallbau Emmeln	Train ride	
Tornado	2000	2004		Chance Rides	Chaos	Moved to Walibi Aquitaine as Kosmic
Wakiki Wave	1995	1999		Vekoma	Waikiki Wave	Replaced by Excalibur

== See also ==
- 2011 in amusement parks
- Defqon.1 Festival
