= Taleqan (disambiguation) =

Taleqan is a city in Alborz Province, Iran.

Taleqan or Taleqani may also refer to:

- Taloqan, a city in Afghanistan
- Taleqani, Fars, a village in Fars Province, Iran
- Taleqani, Mamasani, a village in Fars Province, Iran
- Taleqan, Gilan, a village in Gilan Province, Iran
- Taleqani, Ilam, a village in Ilam Province, Iran
- Taleqan, Isfahan, a village in Isfahan Province, Iran
- Taleqan, Kerman, a village in Kerman Province, Iran
- Rustai-ye Taleqani, Kerman, a village in Kerman Province, Iran
- Taleqan, Lorestan, a village in Lorestan Province, Iran
- Taleqan 1, a village in Lorestan Province, Iran
- Taleqan 2, a village in Lorestan Province, Iran
- Dangi-ye Akbarabad or Taleqani, a village in Lorestan Province, Iran
- Sargrefteh or Taleqani, a village in Lorestan Province, Iran
- Taleqan, West Azerbaijan, a village in West Azerbaijan Province, Iran
- Taleqan County, an administrative subdivision of Alborz Province, Iran

== See also ==
- Talokan (disambiguation)
