= Rustai-ye Taleqani =

Rustai-ye Taleqani (Persian: روستاي طالقاني) may refer to:

- Rustai-ye Taleqani, Fars
- Rustai-ye Taleqani, Kerman
