= Talokan =

Talokan or Talocan may refer to:

- Taloqan, a city in northeastern Afghanistan
- Tlālōcān, a mythological city in Aztec mythology, ruled by Tlāloc and his consort Chalchiuhtlicue
- Talokan (Marvel Cinematic Universe), an underwater kingdom in the Marvel Cinematic Universe ruled by the mutant Namor
- Talocan (ride), a flat ride at Phantasialand in Germany

== See also ==
- Taleqan (disambiguation)
