= Rameses Revenge =

Former ride at Chessington World of Adventures

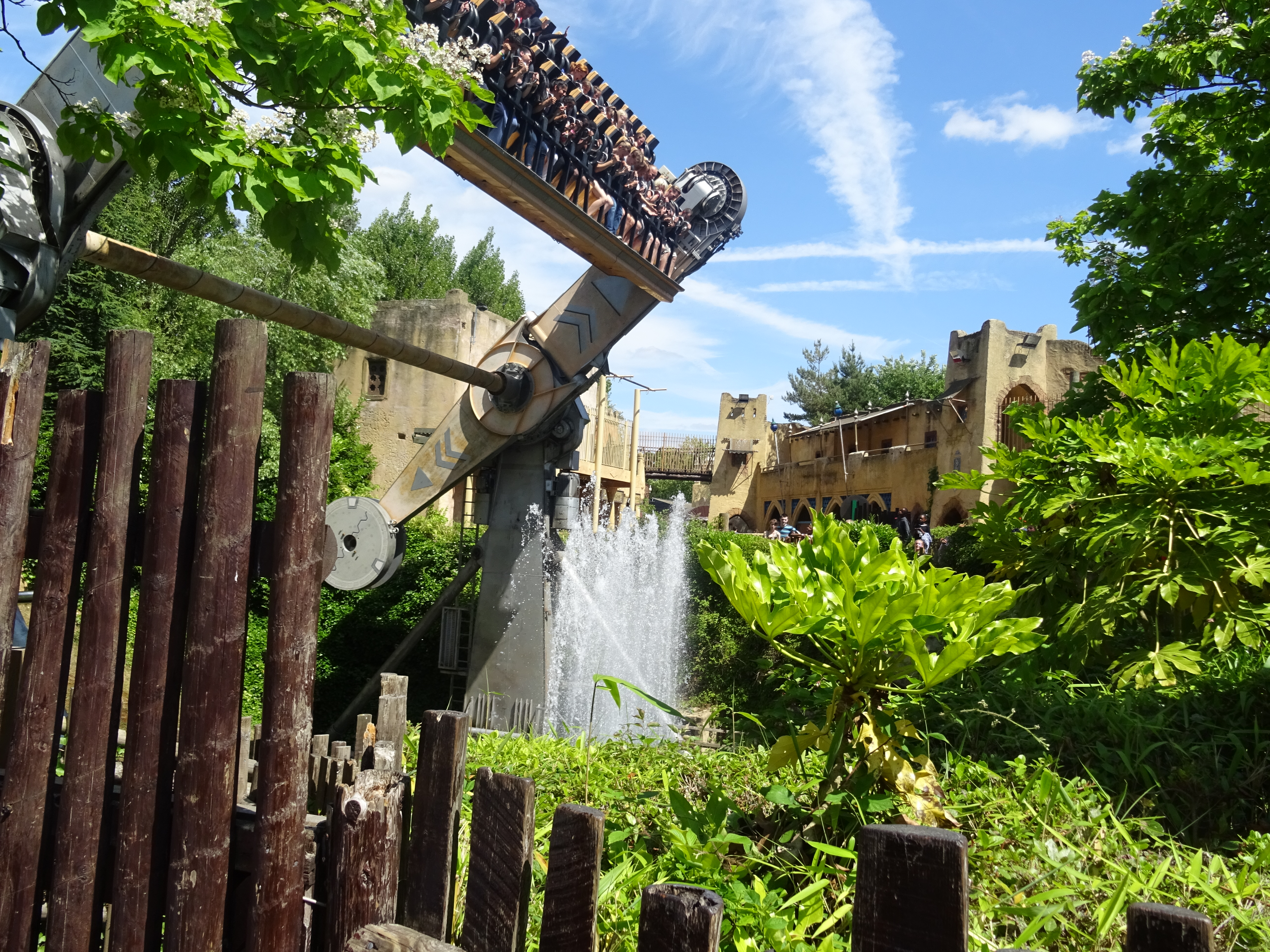
- The ride in 2015

Chessington World of Adventures
- Area: Forbidden Kingdom
- Coordinates: 51°20′56″N 0°19′07″W
- Status: Removed
- Opening date: June 1995
- Closing date: 3 November 2019
- Replaced by: Croc Drop

Ride statistics
- Attraction type: Top Spin
- Manufacturer: Huss Rides
- Height restriction: 140 cm (4 ft 7 in)
- Restraints: Over-the-shoulder and lap bar
- Fastrack available

Rameses Revenge was a Top Spin attraction that debuted at Chessington World of Adventures Resort, Greater London, United Kingdom, in 1995. Manufactured by Huss, it was notable for being the first ride of its type globally to incorporate a "drown-upside-down" element, where riders are slowly lowered face-first toward water jets.

== History and operation ==
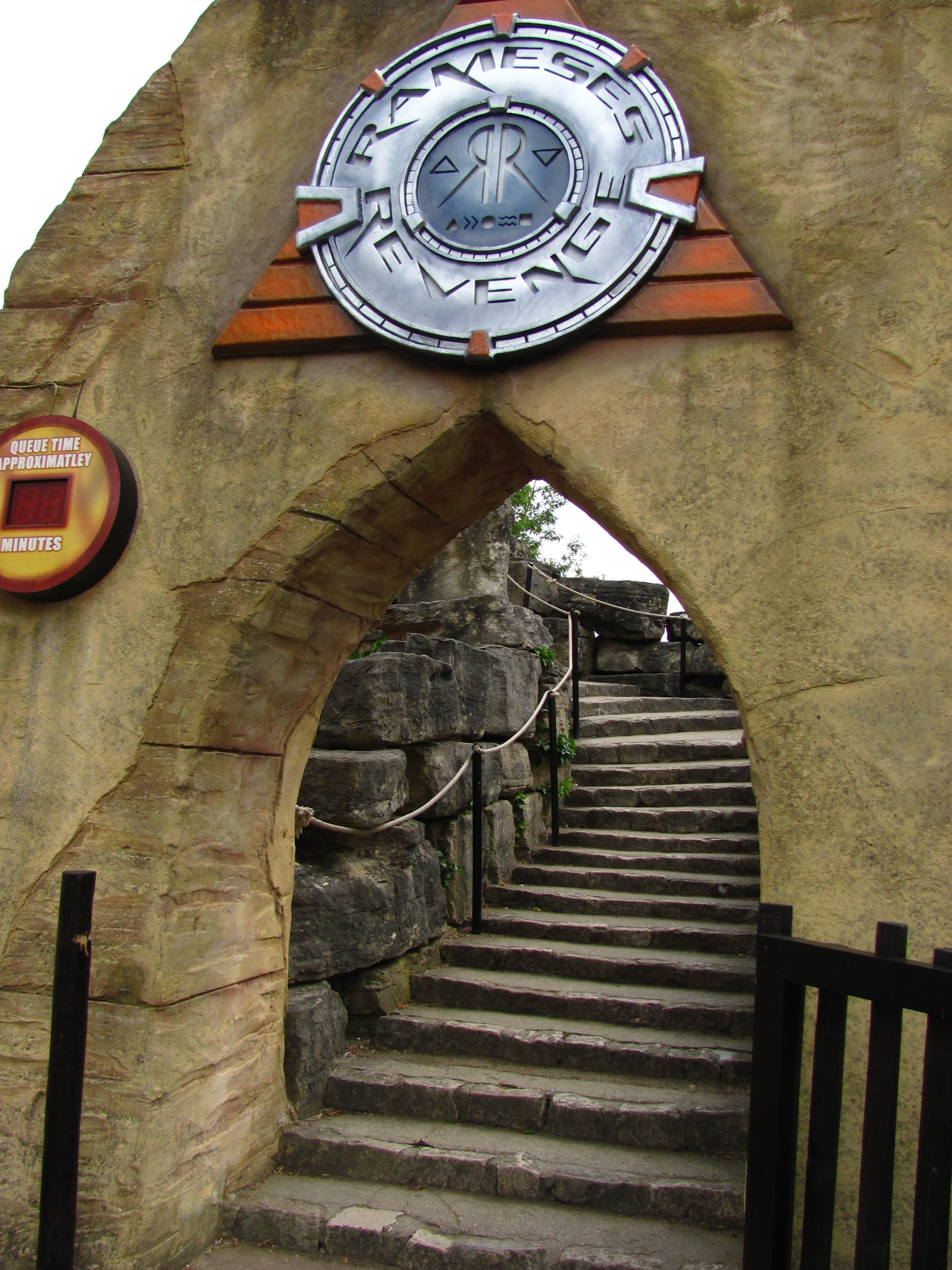
Entrance to the ride in 2010, with Forbidden Kingdom theming.

Rameses Revenge was manufactured by Huss Rides, a German company who had previously made Chessington's Black Buccaneer ride. It was one of the first Top Spin flat rides built to feature water fountains, which spray riders at certain points in the ride cycle. Introduced from June 1995, It is situated in the Egyptian themed Forbidden Kingdom area of the park.

On 23 July 2013, a technical malfunction triggered the attraction's safety systems, causing the ride to stop and leaving 40 passengers suspended in an inverted position. The riders remained trapped above the ground for over an hour before a 20-minute rescue operation commenced. Fire and rescue services were required to manually cut the safety harnesses to release the occupants. Following the evacuation, emergency services treated six individuals for issues including asthma and panic attacks. The ride remained closed for the duration of the 2013 season following the incident.

In 2015, the attraction's entrance was relocated and the queue line was shortened to optimise the surrounding area.

Rameses Revenge officially closed to the public on 3 November 2019. It was subsequently replaced by the family drop tower attraction Croc Drop, which debuted in 2021. Following this closure, the United Kingdom was without a permanent Top Spin installation for several years. This changed in 2024 when Alton Towers announced Toxicator, a new Suspended Top Spin located in their Forbidden Valley section, which officially opened on 15 March 2025.

== See also ==
- Chessington World of Adventures Resort
- Croc Drop (ride)
- Ripsaw (Alton Towers)
