= Ripsaw (disambiguation) =

A ripsaw is a wood saw that is specially designed for making a rip cut, a cut made parallel to the direction of the wood grain.

Ripsaw may also refer to:

- Ripsaw music, music made using a hand saw
- Ripsaw (newspaper), a former Duluth, Minnesota newspaper
- Ripsaw (vehicle), a series of developmental unmanned ground combat vehicles
- Ripsaw (Alton Towers), a defunct theme park ride
- Ripsaw catfish, a species of thorny catfish
