= SBF Visa Group =

Italian amusement ride company

- Industry: Manufacturing
- Founded: 1952
- Founder: Italo Frison
- Headquarters: Casale di Scodosia, Italy
- Area served: Worldwide
- Products: Amusement rides roller coasters
- Website: http://www.sbfrides.com/en/home/ https://visacoasters.it/

SBF Visa Group is an Italian company known for its amusement rides and roller coaster designing. SBF was founded in 1952 by Italo Frison, who initially constructed bumper cars and then children's rides.

== List of roller coasters ==
As of 2021, SBF Visa Group has built 322 roller coasters around the world.

Name	Model	Park	Country	Opened	Status	Ref
City Jet	Take Off (041)	Parc Avenue	France	Unknown	Removed	
Dvergbanen; Formerly Den Aller Minste	Unknown	Tusenfryd	Norway	1996	Operating	
Nissi Coaster	Unknown	Marah Land	Oman	1999	Operating	
Caterpillar Coaster	Caterpillar Coaster (043)	Sherwood Forest Fun Park	United Kingdom	2001	Removed	
Typhoon	Cyclon Coaster (MX49)	Revolution Park	Russia	2001	Operating	
Caterpillar	freizi	Hemsby Fun Park	United Kingdom	2003	Operating	
Mini 8	Family Coaster (MX48)	Hannibal Park	Tunisia	2003	Operating	
Rollercoaster	Family Coaster (MX48)	Funtasia	(Republic of Ireland) Ireland	2003	Operating	
Familienachterbahn	Family Coaster (MX48)	Jagdmärchenpark Hirschalm	Austria	2004	Operating	
Gold Mine Coaster	Mine Train Coaster (MX601)	Fantasiland	Colombia	2004	Operating	
Kolejka Górska	Double Coaster (MX605)	JuraPark Bałtów	Poland	2004	Operating	
Montaña Rusa	Family Coaster (MX48)	Coney Park	Peru	2004	Operating	
Pomme	Family Coaster (MX48)	Katkout	Tunisia	2004	Operating	
Typhoon	Cyclon Coaster (MX49)	Yakutov Park	Russia	2004	Operating	
Cilgin Kopekbaligi	Shark Coaster (MX53)	Fun Lab	Turkey	2005	Operating	
Factory Coaster	Spinning Coaster (MX52)	Moon Toon	Saudi Arabia	2005	Operating	
Family Coaster	Family Coaster (MX48)	Heritage Park	Bangladesh	2005	Operating	
Indianapolis	Speedy Coaster (MX600)	Toy Park	Italy	2005	Operating	
Pomme	Family Coaster (MX48)	Didi'Land	France	2005	Removed	
Achterbahn	Unknown	Trampoline am See	Germany	2006	Removed	
Baby Pomme	Unknown	Parc Babyland	France	2006	Operating	
Family Coaster	Unknown	Koala Park	Azerbaijan	2006	Operating	
Lohikäärme-rata; Formerly Herra Lohikäärme	Unknown	Zones by Särkänniemi	Finland	2006	Operating	
Indiana Jones	Unknown	Mc-Play Kinderland	Germany	2006	Removed	
Minibruco	Caterpillar Coaster (043)	Galactica Lunapark and Bowling	Cyprus	2006	Operating	
Raupe	Family Coaster (MX48)	Freizeitpark Plohn	Germany	2006	Operating	
Taxi	Speedy Coaster (MX600)	Zahroor Park	Tunisia	2006	Operating	
Truck Race	Truck Race (042)	VulQano Park	Ecuador	2006	Operating	
Unknown	Dangle Coaster (MX604)	Jamboo	Saudi Arabia	2006	Operating	
Gold Mine Coaster	Mine Train Coaster (MX601)	Tale Park	Russia	2006	Operating	
Animal Race	Spinning Coaster (MX54)	Fun Oasis	Saudi Arabia	2006	Operating	
Family Coaster	Family Coaster (MX48)	Debrecen Zoo	Hungary	2007	Operating	
Family Coaster	Family Coaster (MX48)	Thamaghra Parc	Algeria	2007	Operating	
Family Worm	Family Coaster (MX48)	Family Park	Croatia	2007	Operating	
Happy Train	Family Coaster (MX48)	Gldani Park	(Georgia (country)) Georgia	2007	Operating	
Looney Tooter	Mine Train Coaster (MX601)	Dream Park	Jordan	2007	Operating	
Safari Tour	Mine Train Coaster (MX601)	Vesuviuslandia Park	Italy	2007	Operating	
Achterbahn	Air Coaster 8 (MX601/A)	Mc-Play Kinderland	Germany	2008	Operating	
Apple Coaster	Caterpillar Coaster (043)	Atallah Happy Land Park	Saudi Arabia	2008	Operating	
Family Coaster	Family Coaster (MX48)	Children's Park East	Kazakhstan	2008	Operating	
Family Coaster	Family Coaster (MX48)	JuraPark Solec	Poland	2008	Operating	
Family Coaster	Family Coaster (MX48)	Lompi Family Park	Algeria	2008	Operating	
F1 Coaster; Formerly Roller Coaster	Spinning Coaster (MX54)	Gondolania Theme Park	Qatar	2009	Operating	
Family Coaster	Family Coaster (MX48)	Mankakan Erkatughi	Armenia	2009	Operating	
Roller Coaster	Unknown	Stargate	United Arab Emirates	2009	Closed	
Spinning Coaster; Formerly Roller Coaster	Spinning Coaster (MX54)	Fun City	United Arab Emirates	2009	Operating	
Unknown	Mine Train Coaster (MX601)	Asdaf Mall	Saudi Arabia	2009	Operating	
Caterpillar	Family Coaster (MX48)	Detskiy Park Im. Gagarina	Russia	2009	Operating	
Family Coaster	Family Coaster (MX48)	Jurapark Krasiejów	Poland	2010	Operating	
Magic Mouse	Spinning Coaster (MX52)	Didi'Land	France	2010	Removed	
Minibruco	Unknown	Baby Park	Italy	2010	Operating	
Mini Canyon	Double Coaster (MX605)	Park Lunasan	Turkey	2010	Removed	
Ring Renner	Unknown	Trampolino Familien- und Freizeitpark	Germany	2010	Operating	
Roller Coaster	Unknown	Sparky's Family Fun Center	United Arab Emirates	2010	Operating	
Speedy Coaster	Unknown	Trampoline am See	Germany	2010	Operating	
Take Off	Take Off (041)	Luna Park Wasfi Al Tal	Jordan	2010	Operating	
Take Off	Take Off (041)	Soukra Parc; Hannibal Park	Tunisia	2010; 2003 to 2007	Operating	
Unknown	Double Coaster (MX605)	Citra Raya World of Wonders	Indonesia	2010	Operating	
Unknown	Unknown	Magic Land	Egypt	2010	Closed	
Mini Canyon	Double Coaster (MX605)	Basra Family Park	Iraq	2010	In Storage	
Dalmatian Coaster	F1 Vortex Coaster (MX607)	City Park	Russia	2010	Operating	
Caterpillar	Family Coaster (MX48)	Park Attraktsionov	Russia	2011	Operating	
Dra Gon	Unknown	Terra Park	Romania	2011	Closed	
Gold Mine	Mine Train Coaster (MX601)	Pavilion Fun Park	United Kingdom	2011	Operating	
Le Tour de Paris	Unknown	Parco Morelli	Italy	2011	Operating	
Mexican Coaster	Mine Train Coaster (MX601)	Moiland	Indonesia	2011	Operating	
Mini Canyon	Double Coaster (MX605)	Safari Park	Turkey	2011	Removed	
Montanha Russa	Cyclon Coaster (MX49)	Parc Magique	Brazil	2011	Removed	
Roller Coaster	Cyclon Coaster (MX49)	Safari Park	Turkey	2011	Removed	
Roller Coaster	Mine Train Coaster (MX601)	Fun City	United Arab Emirates	2011	Operating	
Shark Coaster	Double Coaster (MX605)	Jawa Timur Park 2	Indonesia	2011	Operating	
Shark Trip	Shark Trip (MX601K)	Liberty City Fun	Italy	2011	Operating	
Shark Trip	Shark Trip (MX601K)	Star Park	Turkey	2011	Removed	
Speed Cars	Speedy Coaster (MX600)	Toy Park Beach	Italy	2011	Operating	
Train de la Mine	Unknown	Piratland	France	2011	Operating	
Unknown	Take Off (041)	Bayrampaşa Şehir Parkı	Turkey	2011	Removed	
Unknown	Speedy Coaster (MX600)	Detskiy Gorodok	Russia	2011	Removed	
Air Coaster	Air Coaster (MX602)	Star Park	Turkey	2012	Removed	
Choco Express	Double Coaster (MX605)	Rainbow's End	New Zealand	2012	Operating	
Doggy Dog	Family Coaster (MX48/D)	Planet Quba	Azerbaijan	2012	Operating	
Family Coaster	Family Coaster (MX48)	Twinpigs	Poland	2012	Operating	
Formula 1	Speedy Coaster (MX600)	Your Park	Russia	2012	Operating	
Magic Mouse	Spinning Coaster (MX52)	Planet Quba	Azerbaijan	2012	Closed	
Mini Canyon	Double Coaster (MX605)	Al Qasba	United Arab Emirates	2012	Removed	
Shark Trip	F1 Vortex Coaster (MX607)	Böhmischer Prater	Austria	2012	Operating	
Shark Trip	Double Coaster (MX605)	Star Park	Turkey	2012	Operating	
Silber Mine	Double Coaster (MX605)	Rocolinos Kinderwelt	Germany	2012	Operating	
Speed Cars; Formerly Taxi Coaster	Speedy Coaster (MX600)	Star Park	Turkey	2012	Operating	
Trans-Siberian Express	Spinning Coaster (MX52)	Terra Park	Romania	2012	Closed	
Tren Minero	Mine Train Coaster (MX601)	Coney Park	Peru	2012	Removed	
Unknown	Spinning Coaster (MX52)	Happy Park Zakho	Iraq	2012	Operating	
Children's Family Hill	Speedy Coaster (MX600)	Damanskiy Island Amusement Park	Russia	2012	Operating	
Larven	Double Coaster (MX605)	Kaatach	Sweden	2012	Operating	
Captain Jacks Runaway Train	Double Coaster (MX605)	Pirates Cove Fun Park	United Kingdom	2013	Operating	
Cyclone	Cyclon Coaster (MX49)	City Park of Culture and Rest	Russia	2013	Operating	
FunCoaster	Spinning Coaster (MX52)	Funplex Mount Laurel	United States	2013	Operating	
Indianapolis	Speedy Coaster (MX600)	Cosmic	Russia	2013	Removed	
Küçük Madenciler	Unknown	İsfanbul	Turkey	2013	Operating	
Loco Motion	Double Coaster (MX605)	Steel Pier	United States	2013	Operating	
Mine Train Coaster	Double Coaster (MX605)	Orășelul Copiilor	Romania	2013	Operating	
Rally	Unknown	Kid's Inn	Germany	2013	Operating	
Shark Coaster	Double Coaster (MX605)	Little Playground	Russia	2013	Operating	
Shark Trip	Shark Trip (MX601K)	City Park of Culture and Rest	Russia	2013	Operating	
Formula 1	Double Coaster (MX605)	Gorky Park	Russia	2013	Operating	
Roller Coaster	Cyclon Coaster (MX49)	Shamkir City Park	Azerbaijan	2013	Operating	
Babylon Spinning Coaster	Compact Spinning Coaster 2 Loop (MX608)	Babylon Park	Israel	2014	Operating	
Brucomella; Formerly Apple Coaster	Family Coaster (MX48)	Water Park; Fantasia Luna Park	Greece	2014; 2003 to 2013	Removed	
Çuf Çuf	Unknown	MOİ Park	Turkey	2014	Operating	
Cyclon Coaster	Cyclon Coaster (MX49)	Didi'Land	France	2014	Removed	
Egypt Coaster	Compact Spinning Coaster 2 Loop (MX608)	ChayLend Park	Russia	2014	Operating	
Egypt Coaster	Compact Spinning Coaster 2 Loop (MX608)	Children's World	Turkmenistan	2014	Operating	
Family Coaster	Family Coaster (MX48)	Didi'Land	France	2014	Operating	
Frutti Loop Coaster	Family Coaster (MX48)	Energylandia	Poland	2014	Operating	
Mars	Unknown	Energylandia	Poland	2014	Closed	
Krazy Koaster	Compact Spinning Coaster 2 Loop (MX608)	Silverwood Theme Park	United States	2014	Operating	
Miao Coaster	Double Coaster (MX605)	Etnaland	Italy	2014	Operating	
Myrtle Turtle	Compact Spinning Coaster 2 Loop (MX608)	Pavilion Park	United States	2014	Operating	
Paris Station	Compact Spinning Coaster 2 Loop (MX608)	Happylon	Kazakhstan	2014	Operating	
Race	F1 Vortex Coaster (MX607)	Wiener Prater	Austria	2014	Operating	
Racing Coaster	F1 Vortex Coaster (MX607)	Trampoline Trier	Germany	2014	Operating	
Shark Bay	Shark Trip (MX601K)	Crealy Adventure Park	United Kingdom	2014	Operating	
Shark Trip	Double Coaster (MX605)	Atatürk Parkı	Turkey	2014	Operating	
Shark Trip	Double Coaster (MX605)	Aktur Park	Turkey	2014	Operating	
Speedy Coaster	Speedy Coaster (MX600)	Kid City Tangerang inside the Transmart Cikolol	Indonesia	2014	Operating	
Spinning Coaster	Compact Spinning Coaster 2 Loop (MX608)	Helio Center	Vietnam	2014	Operating	
Spinning Coaster	Compact Spinning Coaster 2 Loop (MX608)	Star Park Luna Park	Turkey	2014	Operating	
Spinning Coaster	Compact Spinning Coaster 2 Loop (MX608)	Western Playland	United States	2014	Removed	
Tomzak Otly	Double Coaster (MX605)	Ashgabat Recreation Park	Turkmenistan	2014	Operating	
Tren Minero	Unknown	Coney Park	Peru	2014	Operating	
Viking Roller Coaster	Spinning Coaster (MX52)	Energylandia	Poland	2014	Operating	
Unknown	Unknown	Babel Land	Saudi Arabia	2014	Operating	
Russian Mountain	Compact Spinning Coaster 2 Loop (MX608)	Magic City	Russia	2014	Operating	
Spinning Coaster	Compact Spinning Coaster 2 Loop (MX608)	Sparky's	Saudi Arabia	2014	Operating	
Mini Canyon	Double Coaster (MX605)	Berlika Parkı	Turkey	2014	Operating	
Air Coaster	Air Coaster 8 (MX601/A)	Fantastic Park	Kazakhstan	2015	Removed	
Blastin' Barrels	Compact Spinning Coaster 2 Loop (MX608)	Cultus Lake Adventure Park	Canada	2015	Operating	
Family Coaster	Compact Spinning Coaster 2 Loop (MX608)	Andretti Thrill Park	United States	2015	Operating	
Gold Mine	Compact Spinning Coaster 2 Loop (MX608)	Funny World	Italy	2015	Operating	
Incredible Spinning Roller Coaster	Compact Spinning Coaster 2 Loop (MX608)	Incredible Pizza Company	United States	2015	Operating	
Kid'z Coaster	Family Coaster (MX48)	Bagatelle	France	2015	Operating	
Kullakaevandus	Double Coaster (MX605)	Kadrioru Karussell	Estonia	2015	Operating	
Mato Mainio; Formerly Karlo's Taxi	Family Coaster (MX48)	Vauhtipuisto; Djurs Sommerland	Finland	2015; 2000 to 2014	Operating	
Spinning Coaster	Compact Spinning Coaster 2 Loop (MX608)	Faby Land	Saudi Arabia	2015	Removed	
Spinning Coaster	Compact Spinning Coaster 2 Loop (MX608)	Multiparque	Colombia	2015	Operating	
Spinning Coaster	Compact Spinning Coaster 2 Loop (MX608)	Trimper's Rides	United States	2015	Operating	
Spinning Coaster	Compact Spinning Coaster 2 Loop (MX608)	Tulsa's Incredible Pizza Company	United States	2015	Operating	
Spinning Coaster	Compact Spinning Coaster 2 Loop (MX608)	ViaSea	Turkey	2015	Operating	
Spinning Lady Bug Coaster	Compact Spinning Coaster 2 Loop (MX608)	Edaville Family Theme Park	United States	2015	Operating	
Tiger Trax	Cyclon Coaster (MX49)	Como Town	United States	2015	Operating	
Twister Rollercoaster	Spinning Coaster (MX52)	Crealy Adventure Park	United Kingdom	2015	Operating	
Whirlwind	Compact Spinning Coaster 2 Loop (MX608)	Great Yarmouth Pleasure Beach	United Kingdom	2015	Operating	
Dragon Train	Unknown	Doha Toys Town	Qatar	2015	Operating	
Spinning Coaster	Compact Spinning Coaster 2 Loop (MX608)	Fairy Tale Park	Kazakhstan	2015	Operating	
Indianapolis	Unknown	Detskiy Gorodok	Russia	2015	Operating	
Bandidos	Compact Spinning Coaster 3 Loop (MX609)	Mer de Sable	France	2016	Operating	
Bisværmen	Compact Spinning Coaster 3 Loop (MX609)	Tivoli Friheden	Denmark	2016	Operating	
Crazy 8	Compact Spinning Coaster 2 Loop (MX608)	Fun Haven	Canada	2016	Operating	
Crazy Coaster	Compact Spinning Coaster 3 Loop (MX609)	Adventure Park	Australia	2016	Operating	
Cyclon Coaster	Cyclon Coaster (MX49)	Farouk Land Annaba Parc	Algeria	2016	Operating	
Doggy Dog	Family Coaster (MX48/D)	Old MacDonald's Farm	United Kingdom	2016	Operating	
Doggy Dog	Family Coaster (MX48/D)	Shumbaland	(Georgia (country)) Georgia	2016	Operating	
Freedom Rider	Compact Spinning Coaster 2 Loop (MX608)	iPlay America	United States	2016	Operating	
Flitzer	Compact Spinning Coaster 2 Loop (MX608)	Chelyuskintsev	Belarus	2016	Operating	
Gold Mine Coaster	Mine Train Coaster (MX601)	Farouk Land Annaba Parc	Algeria	2016	Operating	
Gold Mine Coaster	Mine Train Coaster (MX601)	FameCity	Kazakhstan	2016	Operating	
Incredible Spin Coaster	Compact Spinning Coaster 2 Loop (MX608)	St. Louis's Incredible Pizza Company	United States	2016	Operating	
Log Roller Coaster	Compact Spinning Coaster 2 Loop (MX608)	Yellowstone Bear World	United States	2016	Operating	
Poogee Penguin's Spin Out	Compact Spinning Coaster 3 Loop (MX609)	Santa's Village	United States	2016	Operating	
Runaway Train	Unknown	Ocean Beach Pleasure Park	United Kingdom	2016	Removed	
Runaway Train	Double Coaster (MX605)	St Nicholas Park	United Kingdom	2016	Operating	
Slingshot	Compact Spinning Coaster 2 Loop (MX608)	Camden Park	United States	2016	Operating	
Speedy Coaster	Mine Train Coaster (MX601)	Sparky's; Sparky's Family Fun Center	United Arab Emirates	2016; 2009 to 2015	Operating	
Spinning Coaster	Compact Spinning Coaster 2 Loop (MX608)	Cannon Hill Park	United Kingdom	2016	Operating	
Spinning Coaster	Compact Spinning Coaster 2 Loop (MX608)	Galaxy	Ukraine	2016	Operating	
Spinning Coaster	Compact Spinning Coaster 2 Loop (MX608)	Happyland	Peru	2016	Operating	
Spinning Coaster	Compact Spinning Coaster 2 Loop (MX608)	Incredible Pizza Company	United States	2016	Operating	
Spinning Out	Compact Spinning Coaster 3 Loop (MX609)	Beech Bend	United States	2016	Operating	
Spin-O-Rama	Compact Spinning Coaster 2 Loop (MX608)	Cliff's Amusement Park	United States	2016	Operating	
Tren Minero	Mine Train Coaster (MX601)	Zona Magica	Argentina	2016	Operating	
Twiztlers	Compact Spinning Coaster 2 Loop (MX608)	Funtazmo	Oman	2016	Operating	
Whirlwind	Compact Spinning Coaster 2 Loop (MX608)	Playland's Castaway Cove	United States	2016	Operating	
Unknown	Compact Spinning Coaster 2 Loop (MX608)	Safari Park	Ecuador	2016	Operating	
Gold Mine	F1 Vortex Coaster (MX607)	Kouta Park; Funny World	Egypt	2016; 2007 to 2015	Operating	
Aircraft	Unknown	Le Fleury	France	2017	Operating	
Barnyard Dance	Compact Spinning Coaster 2 Loop (MX608)	Bengtson's Pumpkin Farm	United States	2017	Operating	
Bug Whirled	Compact Spinning Coaster 2 Loop (MX608)	Playland	Canada	2017	Operating	
Circus Coaster	Dragoon Coaster (MX600/D)	Energylandia	Poland	2017	Operating	
Cosmic	Compact Spinning Coaster 2 Loop (MX608)	Happylon Adventure Park	Kazakhstan	2017	Operating	
Crazy 8	Compact Spinning Coaster 2 Loop (MX608)	FunXcess	United States	2017	Removed	
Crystal Mine Train	Double Coaster (MX605)	Magic Planet	United Arab Emirates	2017	Operating	
Doggy Dog	Family Coaster (MX48/D)	Freizeit-Land Geiselwind	Germany	2017	Operating	
Drachenwirbel	Compact Spinning Coaster 3 Loop (MX609)	Freizeitpark Plohn	Germany	2017	Operating	
Genesis Kidz Koaster	Compact Spinning Coaster 2 Loop (MX608)	Modern Woodmen Park	United States	2017	Operating	
Hang Ten	Compact Spinning Coaster 2 Loop (MX608)	Fantasy Island Amusement Park	United States	2017	Operating	
Happy Loops	Compact Spinning Coaster 3 Loop (MX609)	Energylandia	Poland	2017	Operating	
Kids Spin	Compact Spinning Coaster 3 Loop (MX609)	Skyline Park	Germany	2017	Operating	
Mine Train Coaster	Mine Train Coaster (MX601)	Fun Park Biograd	Croatia	2017	Operating	
Mining Racer Coaster	Race Coaster	Gumbuya World	Australia	2017	Operating	
Mumbai Express; Formerly Spinning Coaster	Compact Spinning Coaster 3 Loop (MX609)	Global Village	United Arab Emirates	2017	Operating	
Peppermint Penguin Coaster	Compact Spinning Coaster 3 Loop (MX609)	Santa's Village	Canada	2017	Operating	
Rattler	Compact Spinning Coaster 2 Loop (MX608)	Alley Cats	United States	2017	Operating	
Spin Coaster	Compact Spinning Coaster 2 Loop (MX608)	Wolmi Theme Park	South Korea	2017	Operating	
Spinning Coaster	Compact Spinning Coaster 2 Loop (MX608)	Ikoma Skyland	Japan	2017	Operating	
Spinning Coaster	Compact Spinning Coaster 2 Loop (MX608)	Park Lunasan	Turkey	2017	Operating	
Spinning Coaster	Compact Spinning Coaster 2 Loop (MX608)	Sparky's	Saudi Arabia	2017	Operating	
Spinning Coaster	Compact Spinning Coaster 2 Loop (MX608)	Track Family Fun Park; Pier Park Amusement Rides	United States	2017; 2014 to 2016	Operating	
Zugo's Crystal Quest	Compact Spinning Coaster 2 Loop (MX608)	Movie Animation Park Studios	Malaysia	2017	Operating	
Unknown	Compact Spinning Coaster 2 Loop (MX608)	Faby Land	Saudi Arabia	2017	Operating	
Gusanito	Family Coaster (MX48)	Coney Park; Located adjacent Plaza Vea; Coney Park; Part of the Mega Plaza Norte complex	Peru	2017; 2008 to 2017	Operating	
Unknown	Double Coaster (MX605)	Funky Town	Russia	2017	Operating	
Unknown	Family Coaster (MX48)	Baghdad Island	Iraq	2017	Operating	
Tornado	Unknown	Electric Amusement Park	Russia	2017	Operating	
Gold Mine Coaster	Unknown	Happyland	Dominican Republic	2017	Operating	
3 Loops Coaster	Compact Spinning Coaster 3 Loop (MX609)	Central Park	Uzbekistan	2018	Operating	
Achterbahn	F1 Vortex Coaster (MX607)	Flippolino	Germany	2018	Operating	
African Spin	Compact Spinning Coaster 3 Loop (MX609)	Tatzmania Löffingen	Germany	2018	Operating	
Bûche Dansante	Compact Spinning Coaster 3 Loop (MX609)	Babyland-Amiland	France	2018	Operating	
Carros Locos	Spinning Coaster (MX52)	Kataplum	Mexico	2018	Operating	
Caterpillar	Caterpillar Coaster (043)	Happy Land	Saudi Arabia	2018	Operating	
Chu-Chu	Monorail Coaster (MX667)	Kataplum	Mexico	2018	Operating	
Cruiser Coaster	Compact Spinning Coaster 2 Loop (MX608)	Craig's Cruisers Family Fun Center	United States	2018	Operating	
Cyclon Coaster	Cyclon Coaster (MX49)	Central Park	Uzbekistan	2018	Operating	
Cyclone	Cyclon Coaster (MX49)	Barry Island Pleasure Park	United Kingdom	2018	Operating	
Dino Coaster	Compact Spinning Coaster 3 Loop (MX609)	T-Rex Park Campinas	Brazil	2018	Operating	
Dolle Pier	Family Coaster (MX48)	DippieDoe Familiepark	Netherlands	2018	Operating	
Junior Red Force	Race Coaster	Ferrari Land	Spain	2018	Operating	
Ladybird Loop	Compact Spinning Coaster 2 Loop (MX608)	Tayto Park	(Republic of Ireland) Ireland	2018	Operating	
Lost Mine	Unknown	Jungle Land	Saudi Arabia	2018	Operating	
Race Coaster	Race Coaster	Land of Legends Theme Park	Turkey	2018	Operating	
Rum Runner	Compact Spinning Coaster 2 Loop (MX608)	Twinlakes Park	United Kingdom	2018	Operating	
Spinning Coaster	Compact Spinning Coaster 2 Loop (MX608)	Churpfalzpark	Germany	2018	Operating	
Spinning Coaster	Compact Spinning Coaster Unknown	Kindstad Heerlen	Netherlands	2018	Operating	
Spinning Coaster	Compact Spinning Coaster 2 Loop (MX608)	Skallywag Bay Theme Park	Trinidad and Tobago	2018	Operating	
Spinning Coaster	Compact Spinning Coaster 2 Loop (MX608)	Vinpearl Land Hoi An	Vietnam	2018	Operating	
Speed Coaster	Family Coaster (MX48)	Vinpearl Land Hoi An	Vietnam	2018	Operating	
Spinning Parrot	Compact Spinning Coaster Unknown	Island in Pigeon Forge	United States	2018	Operating	
Trampolino-Coaster	Cyclon Coaster (MX49)	Trampolino Familien- und Freizeitpark	Germany	2018	Operating	
Twist-N-Shout	Compact Spinning Coaster 2 Loop (MX608)	Fun Land of Fredericksburg	United States	2018	Operating	
Twist-N-Shout	Compact Spinning Coaster 2 Loop (MX608)	Malibu Jack's Lexington	United States	2018	Operating	
Wild Whizzer	Compact Spinning Coaster 2 Loop (MX608)	Morey's Piers	United States	2018	Operating	
Wipeout	Compact Spinning Coaster 2 Loop (MX608)	Palace Playland	United States	2018	Operating	
Indianapolis	Unknown	Funny Park	Russia	2018	Operating	
Unknown	Compact Spinning Coaster 2 Loop (MX608)	Playaza	India	2018	Operating	
Unknown	Race Coaster	Safari Park	Ecuador	2018	Operating	
Unknown	Speedy Coaster (MX600)	Tropik-Lend	Russia	2018	Operating	
Sky Rangers	Micro Coaster	Tom Foolerys Adventure Park	United States	2018	Operating	
Coaster	Compact Spinning Coaster 2 Loop (MX608)	Games Island	Jordan	2018	Operating	
Unknown	Compact Spinning Coaster Unknown	Faby Land	Saudi Arabia	2018	Operating	
Formula Viatti	Race Coaster	City Park	Russia	2018	Operating	
Infinity Ride	Unknown	Tekzone	Kuwait	2018	Operating	
Tidal Wave	Spinning Coaster 5.0 (MX611)	Jenkinson's Boardwalk	United States	2019	Operating	
Altin Madeni Coaster	Mine Train Coaster (MX601)	Wonderland Eurasia	Turkey	2019	Operating	
Migfer	Tower Coaster (MX875)	Wonderland Eurasia; DippieDoe Familiepark	Turkey	2019; Unknown	Closed	
Spinning Coaster	Compact Spinning Coaster 2 Loop (MX608)	CJ Barrymore's Family Entertainment Center	United States	2019	Operating	
Speedy Beetle	Compact Spinning Coaster Unknown	Luna Park	Australia	2019	Operating	
Egyptian Spinning Coaster	Compact Spinning Coaster 3 Loop (MX609)	Star City	Philippines	2019	Operating	
Mad Mouse	Cyclon Coaster (MX49)	Clarence Pier	United Kingdom	2019	Operating	
Tidal Wave	Spinning Coaster 5.0 (MX611)	Clarence Pier	United Kingdom	2019	Operating	
Far West Express	Race Coaster	AnimaParc	France	2019	Operating	
Spinning Coaster	Compact Spinning Coaster 2 Loop (Mini)	Kitakas Diversões	Brazil	2019	Operating	
Panky's Adventure	Mine Train Coaster (MX601)	Speelparadijs Pannenkoekenhuis Voorst	Netherlands	2019	Removed	
Nuclear Rush	Compact Spinning Coaster 2 Loop (MX608)	Scene75 Entertainment Center	United States	2019	Operating	
Mola Mola	Spinning Coaster 5.0 (MX611)	Ocean Dream Samudra	Indonesia	2019	Operating	
Kaffekannen-Express	Monorail Coaster (MX667)	Karls Erlebnis-Dorf	Germany	2019	Operating	
Twist-N-Shout	Compact Spinning Coaster 2 Loop (MX608)	Malibu Jack's Louisville	United States	2019	Operating	
Holta Di Polta	Micro Coaster	Rasti-Land	Germany	2019	Operating	
Spinning Out	Compact Spinning Coaster 3 Loop (MX609)	Sommerland Sjælland	Denmark	2019	Operating	
Crazy 8's	Compact Spinning Coaster 2 Loop (MX608)	John's Incredible Pizza Company	United States	2019	Operating	
Race Coaster	Race Coaster	Fabyland	Oman	2019	Operating	
Forest Adventure	Double Coaster (MX605)	Gyeongnam Mason Robotland	South Korea	2019	Operating	
Erdbeer Raupenbahn	Family Coaster (MX48)	Karls Erlebnis-Dorf Rövershagen	Germany	2019	Operating	
Erdbeer Raupenbahn	Family Coaster (MX48)	Karls Erlebnis-Dorf Koserow	Germany	2020	Operating	
Erdbeer Raupenbahn	Family Coaster (MX48)	Karls Erlebnis-Dorf Zirkow	Germany	2020	Operating	
Cyclone	Cyclon Coaster (MX49)	Gagarin Park	Russia	2020	Operating	
Family Coaster	Family Coaster (MX48)	Parc de la Récréation; Family Park	France	2020; 2014 to 2019	Operating	
Kuhddel Muuuhddel	Compact Spinning Coaster 2 Loop (MX608)	Taunus Wunderland	Germany	2020	Operating	
Pearly Whirly Coaster	Big Air Coaster	Craig's Cruisers Family Fun Center	United States	2020	Operating	
Whirlwind	Compact Spinning Coaster 2 Loop (MX608)	Waldameer & Water World	United States	2020	Operating	
Roller Castor	Family Coaster (MX48)	Nestor Le Castor	France	2020	Operating	
Skyflyer	Micro Coaster	COTALAND	United States	2020	Operating	
Screamin' Centipede	Big Air Coaster	Tom Foolerys Adventure Park	United States	2020	Operating	
Star Force Orbiter	Micro Coaster	Tom Foolerys Adventure Park	United States	2020	Operating	
Tsunami	Spinning Coaster 5.0 (MX611)	Scene75 Entertainment Center Dayton	United States	2020	Operating	
Barreling Rapids	Spinning Coaster 5.0 (MX611)	Austin's Park n' Pizza	United States	2021	Operating	
Spinning Coaster	Compact Spinning Coaster 2 Loop (MX608)	Shimizu Marina Circus	Japan	2021	Operating	
Skyflyer	Micro Coaster	Deno's Wonder Wheel Amusement Park	United States	2021	Operating	
Happy Coaster	Compact Spinning Coaster 3 Loop (MX609)	Yerevan Park	Armenia	2021	Operating	
Hullámvasút	Double Coaster (MX605)	Sobri Jóska Kalandpark	Hungary	2021	Operating	
Fun in the Sun	Big Air Coaster	Funplex Myrtle Beach	United States	2021	Operating	
Wicky	Double Mine Train Extended	Freizeitpark Familienland	Austria	2021	Operating	
Grand Prix Racers	Race Coaster	Gulliver's Valley	United Kingdom	2021	Operating	
Crazy Coaster	Compact Spinning Coaster 2 Loop (MX608)	Funland Theme Park; Trampoline Trier	United Kingdom	2021; 2017 to 2020	Operating	
€uro Coaster	Cyclon Coaster (MX49)	Funland Theme Park	United Kingdom	2021	Operating	
Spinning Coaster	Compact Spinning Coaster 2 Loop (MX608)	Magic City	Uzbekistan	2021	Operating	
GraviTrax	Big Air Coaster	Ravensburger Spieleland	Germany	2021	Operating	
Mroczny Dwór	Spinning Coaster	Mandoria	Poland	2021	Operating	
Space Twister	Compact Spinning Coaster 2 Loop (MX608)	Doha Quest	Qatar	2021	Operating	
Blu Miner	Family Coaster (MX48)	Tetysblu Theme Park	Kazakhstan	2021	Operating	
Storm Chaser	Compact Spinning Coaster 2 Loop (MX608)	In The Game Funtrackers	United States	2021	Operating	
Xolo Loca	Big Air Coaster	Casino Pier	United States	2021	Operating	
Funscape Coaster	Compact Spinning Coaster 2 Loop (MX608)	Funscape World	Bahrain	2021	Operating	
Unknown	Compact Spinning Coaster 2 Loop (MX608)	Funtura	India	2021	Operating	
Max's Doggy Dog Coaster	Family Coaster (MX48/D)	SpeedZone; Niagara Amusement Park & Splash World	United States	N/A; 2013 to 2019	Removed	
Twist-N-Shout	Compact Spinning Coaster 2 Loop (MX608)	Malibu Jack's Ashland	United States	2022	Operating	
Shark Party	Compact Spinning Coaster 2 Loop (MX608)	Track Family Fun Myrtle Beach	United States	2022	Operating	
High Voltage	Mixed Coaster (MX620)	Big Rivers Waterpark	United States	2022	Operating	
Taka Waka; Formerly Tiger Ride	Cyclon Coaster (MX49)	Freizeit-Land Geiselwind; Kneippbyn	Germany	2022; 2016 to 2019-2021	Operating	
Texas Twister	Compact Spinning Coaster 2 Loop (MX608)	Julianatoren	Netherlands	2022	Operating	
RobalCoaster	Family Coaster (MX48/D)	Zatorland	Poland	2022	Operating	
Strohnado	Mixed Coaster (MX620)	Rasti-Land	Germany	2022	Operating	
Spinning Coaster	Compact Spinning Coaster 2 Loop (MX608)	Track Family Fun Parks Branson	United States	2022	Operating	
Shark Escape	Double Coaster (MX605)	Jenkinson's Boardwalk	United States	2022	Operating	
E.R.S.	Family Coaster (Custom)	Babylon Park	United Kingdom	2022	Operating	
Lokolo	Family Coaster (MX48)	Lost Island Theme Park	United States	2022	Operating	
Spinning Coaster	Compact Spinning Coaster 2 Loop (MX608)	Track Recreation Center	United States	2022	Operating	
Power Surge	Mixed Coaster (MX620)	Airway Fun Center	United States	2022	Operating	
Grand Prix Racers	Race Coaster	Gulliver's Land	United Kingdom	2022	Operating	
Biloxi Beach Hurricane	Cyclon Coaster (MX49)	Big Play Entertainment Center	United States	2022	Operating	
Tsunami	Spinning Coaster 5.0 (MX611)	Scene75 Entertainment Center Romeoville	United States	2022	Operating	
Airplanes	Double Coaster (MX605)	Kiftzuba	Israel	2022	Operating	
Twist-N-Shout	Compact Spinning Coaster 2 Loop (MX608)	Malibu Jack's Lafayette	United States	2022	Operating	
Sky Coaster	Big Air Coaster	Lusail Winter Wonderland	Qatar	2022	Operating	
Formula 1 Coaster	Race Coaster	Cidade da Criança	Brazil	2023	Operating	
Rolling Thunder	Mixed Coaster 3 Loop	Paradise Pier Fun Park	United States	2023	Operating	
Aero Kid'z	Family Coaster (MX48)	Kid'zland	Switzerland	2023	Operating	
Flotter Otto	Double Mine Train Extended	Skyline Park	Germany	2023	Operating	
Erdbeer-Raupenbahn	Family Coaster (MX48)	Karls Erlebnis-Dorf Elstal	Germany	2023	Operating	
Grand Prix Racers	Race Coaster	Gulliver's World	United Kingdom	2023	Operating	
Barrels of Fun	Compact Spinning Coaster 2 Loop (MX608)	Tweetsie Railroad	United States	2023	Operating	
Achterbahn	Double Mine Train Extended	Charles Knie's Circus-Land	Germany	2023	Operating	
Havana Spinning Adventure	Compact Spinning Coaster 3 Loop (MX609)	Mondo Verde	Netherlands	2023	Operating	
Kalkracet	Double Mine Train Extended	Kneippbyn	Sweden	2023	Operating	
Farmers Fling	Compact Spinning Coaster 2 Loop (MX608)	Santa's Village AZoosment Park	United States	2023	Operating	
Spinning Coaster; Spin-o-Saurus	Compact Spinning Coaster 2 Loop (MX608)	Zao Island; Wonderland Amusement Park; Wild Willy's Adventure Zone	United States	2023; 2018 to 2022; 2015 to 2017	Operating	
Big Air Coaster	Big Air Coaster	Animalia	Brazil	2023	Operating	
Wolken-Express	Monorail Coaster (MX667)	Karls Erlebnis-Dorf	Germany	2023	Operating	
Racing Coaster	F1 Vortex Coaster (MX607)	Britannia Pier	United Kingdom	2023	Operating	
Gira Chocomonstros	Big Air Coaster	Cacau Show Megastore Itapevi	Brazil	2023	Operating	
Verrücktwärts	Shift Gear Coaster (MX627)	Rasti-Land	Germany	2023	Operating	
Family Coaster	Family Launched Coaster (MX623)	Churpfalzpark	Germany	2024	Under construction	
Berg- und Tal Hetz	Family Launch Coaster (MX624)	Skyline Park	Germany	2024	Under construction	
Cinder Roller Coaster	Compact Spinning Coaster 3 Loop (MX609)	Storybook Land	United States	2024	Under construction	
Erdbeer-Raupenbahn	Family Coaster (MX48)	Karls Erlebnis-Dorf Döbeln	Germany	2024	Under construction	
Erdbeer-Raupenbahn	Family Coaster (MX48)	Karls Erlebnis-Dorf Oberhausen	Germany	2024	Under construction	
Erdbeer-Raupenbahn	Family Coaster (MX48)	Karls Erlebnis-Dorf Plech	Germany	2025	Under construction	
Erdbeer-Raupenbahn	Family Coaster (MX48)	Karls Erlebnis-Dorf Loxstedt	Germany	2025	Under construction	
Pohjolan Express	Ultra Family Coaster	Tykkimäki	Finland	2026	Under construction	

== Other attractions ==
Name	Model	Park	Country	Opened	Status	Ref
Treasure Island Boats	Mini Log Flume	Energylandia	Poland	Unknown	Operating	
Dance Party 360	Midi Dance Party 360	The Island in Pigeon Forge	United States	Unknown	Operating	
Blue's Skidoo	Bounce Spin	Nickelodeon Universe at the Mall of America	United States	2008	Operating	
Funny Cars	Crazy Tour	The Island in Pigeon Forge	United States	Unknown	Operating	
High Score	Air Balloon 19 m	The Island in Pigeon Forge	United States	Unknown	Operating	
Reverse Time	Reverse Time 12	The Island in Pigeon Forge	United States	Unknown	Operating	
Spinning Cars	Spinning Cars	Adventureland	United States	2000	Removed	
Krazy Cars	Twirling Taxi	Krazy City	United States	2006	Removed	
Twirlin’ Taxi	Twirling Taxi	Tilt Studio	United States	2012	Removed	
Dance Party	Maxi Dance Party 360 24	Planet Quba	Azerbaijan	2013	Operating	
Spincycle	Maxi Dance Party 360 24	Silverwood Theme Park	United States	2013	Operating	
Rotator	Maxi Dance Party 360 24	Emerald Park	(Republic of Ireland) Ireland	2014	Operating	
Space Gun	Space Gun	Energylandia	(Poland) United States	2014	Operating	
Maxi Dance Party 360	Maxi Dance Party 360 24	Kouta Park	Egypt	2015	Operating	
Rock ‘n Rodeo	Traffic Jam	Six Flags New England	United States	2016	Operating	
Singapore Sling	Maxi Dance Party 360 24	Ba Na Hills Sun World	Vietnam	2016	Operating	
High Fly	Maxi Dance Party 360 24	Skyline Park	Germany	2017	Operating	
Rhino Sling	Maxi Dance Party 360 24	Dragon Park Ha Long	Vietnam	2017	Operating	
Dance Party	Maxi 360 Dance Party 24	Dahdah Happy Land	Tunisia	2018	Operating	
Axis	Maxi Dance Party 360	Adventure Island	United Kingdom	2019	Operating	
Twirlin’ Taxi	Twirling Taxi	Tilt Studio	United States	2021	Operating	
Croc Drop	Drop'n Twist Tower	Chessington World of Adventures	United Kingdom	2021	Operating	
Ostrich Stampede	Super Jumper	Chessington World of Adventures	United Kingdom	2023	Operating	
Mamba Strike	Top Dancer	Chessington World of Adventures	United Kingdom	2023	Operating	
Spinning Cars	Spinning Cars	Story Book Park	Canada	2024	Operating	
Vertigo	Drop'n Twist 38 Mt	Adventure Island	United Kingdom	2024	Operating	
Wolf Legend	Drop'n Twist Tower	Gardaland	Italy	2024	Operating	
Traffic Jam	Traffic Jam	Sommerland Sjælland	Denmark	Unknown	Operating	
Le Trafic Jam	Traffic Jam	Didi’land	France	Unknown	Operating	
Traffic Jam	Traffic Jam	Dream Park	Jordan	Unknown	Unknown	
