= Camel Creek Adventure Park =

Adventure park located in Cornwall, England

Camel Creek Family Theme Park
- Previously known as Cornwall's Crealy Adventure Park
- Interactive map of Camel Creek Family Theme Park
- Location: Wadebridge, Cornwall, England
- Coordinates: 50.4899°N 4.9308°W
- Status: Operating
- Opened: 1989; 37 years ago
- Owner: Royale Life
- Operating season: Opening days/times vary throughout the year
- Area: 111 acres (45 ha)
- Website: Official website

Camel Creek Family Theme Park is an adventure park located in Wadebridge in Cornwall, England.

== History ==
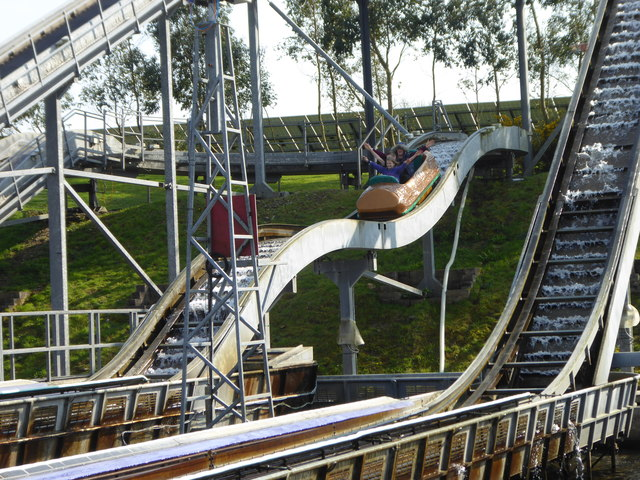
Water ride

Terry Sandling bought Trelow Farm in Tredinnick and opened the property to the public in 1989 as The Shire Horse Centre. The property was then sold to Crealy Great Adventure Parks in 2004, and was branded as Cornwall's Crealy. Following an acquisition in 2015, John Broome CBE purchased Cornwall's Crealy and rebranded it as Camel Creek Adventure Park. It was then bought by Royale Life and is now known as Camel Creek Family Theme Park.

== Attractions ==
There is a 5D theatre ("Mission Simpossible") with moving seats, 3D glasses and other equipment; the theatre also has 3D theatre viewings. There is also an indoor soft play area (Creeky's playhouse), Swamp Busters, animal areas as well as seasonal attractions such as a haunted house at Halloween and Santa's Grotto at Christmas.

== Proposed developments ==
At the same time as purchasing the park, John Broome also purchased nearly 200 acres (81 ha) of land adjacent to it and announced his plans to turn Camel Creek Adventure park into a six-star resort. If developed as proposed, the plans would have created 955 jobs in and around a holiday and leisure park with 236 holiday homes. There would have also been a convention centre and amenities such as a restaurant, pub and shops. After the council granted permission for the project in October 2016, work was planned to complete in 2022 with construction reducing season times, opening hours and ride availability of Camel Creek. Although minimal progress has been made to the project, and with the plans being scaled back, Royale Life plan to continue with the expansion.
