= Top Spin (ride) =

Type of amusement ride

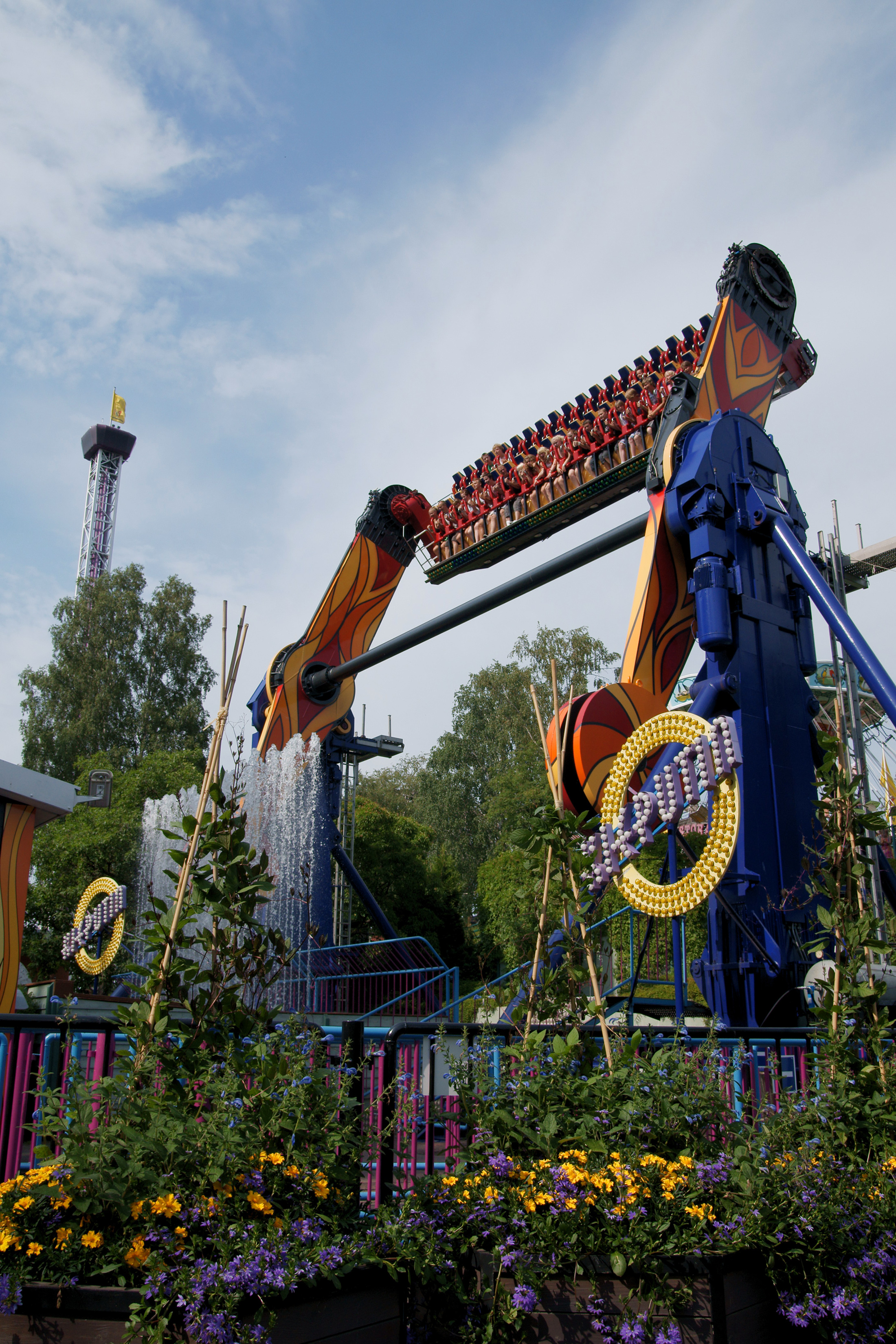
Kieputin at Linnanmäki in Helsinki, an original HUSS Top Spin

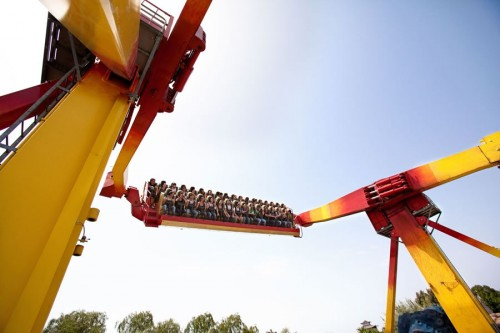
Moser's Rides' Super Loop on Top, a Top Spin ride variation

The Top Spin is a thrill ride developed by HUSS Park Attractions, and is the generic name for a series of rides from other manufacturers that follow the same principle. The ride consists of a passenger platform suspended between two counterweighted arms. The arms are turned by motors, while the platform usually only has brakes that are engaged and disengaged at various points of the ride cycle. A typical Top Spin program runs the main arm motors while engaging and disengaging the platform brakes so that it will rotate in exciting ways. The minimum rider height requirement is 54 inches, and the maximum is 80 inches, due to the seat and restraint design. The ride was first introduced to the public in 1990 on European fair circuits.

== Ride experience ==
HUSS has designed the ride so that park and carnival operators may choose one of eight preset ride "programs". Most last no more than two minutes and consist of several moderate-speed flips and face-down "hangtime", before unlocking the gondola hydraulics and swinging the riders back and forth. Some Top Spin rides have the added feature of water fountains, which are mainly used at the end of the ride sequence, soaking the riders as they are slowly lowered face-first into the jets. Cycles can be customized to include more intense repetitive flips, and also can be put under manual operator control. A world record was set with over 100 gondola flips during a cycle on a Top Spin in Germany.

== Variations ==
- The original Top Spin has two rows of 20 seats each, for a 40-passenger total, with self-lowering lap bars and rider spotlights.
- The Giant Top Spin is a larger version of the Top Spin, seating up to 84 passengers in three rows on the platform. Only one Giant Top Spin was ever built, The Crypt at Kings Island. However, its third row was removed in 2008, reducing its capacity. It closed after the 2011 season.
- The Suspended Top Spin is a floorless version of the ride that can hold up to 38 passengers in two rows back-to-back.
- The Top Spin 2 is a smaller version of the original, designed for showmen who require a ride that fits onto a single trailer. This version enables the platform to perform more flips. It also features telescoping drum supports to hold the main control arms.

There are numerous other Top Spin-inspired ride models that were later developed by other manufacturers. Some of these variations of allow each individual arm to be controlled separately, creating diagonal gondola inversions. Various examples of Top Spin-inspired ride models include "Windshear" by Zamperla, "Super Loop" by Moser's Rides, "Waikiki Wave" by Vekoma, "Super Nova" by Mondial, and "Discovery" by KMG.

== Installations ==
The Top Spin was once a common ride at travelling carnivals, particularly in Germany. Over time, many of the travelling versions of the ride have been sold to amusement parks or put in storage indefinitely.

Below are lists of all known Top Spin rides.

=== Transportable ===
Name	Owner	Country	Manufacturer	Model	Premiere	Status
Top Spin No.1 [Prototype]	Peter Bausch	Germany	HUSS Park Attractions	Top Spin	1990	Operating
Colorado Rafting	Bruch Schneider	Germany	HUSS Park Attractions	Top Spin	1990	Sold
Revolution	Ronny Weber	Germany	HUSS Park Attractions	Top Spin	1990	In storage
Top Spin FRESH	E.Fleur	France	HUSS Park Attractions	Top Spin	1991	Operating
Top Spin	Ludewigt	Germany	HUSS Park Attractions	Top Spin	1991	In storage
Revolution	Naisse	France	HUSS Park Attractions	Top Spin	1992	In storage
Revolution/Top Spin	Dir.Paillet	France	HUSS Park Attractions	Top Spin	1992	In storage
Top Spin 2	Plaenert	Germany	HUSS Park Attractions	Top Spin 2	1993	Sold
Top Spin	Buser	Switzerland	HUSS Park Attractions	Top Spin 2	1993	Sold
Top Spin	Strates Shows	United States	HUSS Park Attractions	Top Spin	1993	In storage
Top Spin FRESH	The Mellors Group	Saudi Arabia	HUSS Park Attractions	Top Spin	1993	Unknown
Bat Spin; Formerly Top Spin	Picci	Italy	HUSS Park Attractions	Top Spin	1994	In storage
Top Spin	Straub	Germany	HUSS Park Attractions	Top Spin 2	1994	In storage
Top Spin 2	Meyer-Hadlok	Germany	HUSS Park Attractions	Top Spin 2	1994	Sold
Top Spin Nº1	Karl-Heinz Scheele	Germany	HUSS Park Attractions	Top Spin 2	1996	Sold
Top Spin	Ludewigt	Germany	HUSS Park Attractions	Top Spin	1997	Sold
Top Spin	Plaenert	Germany	HUSS Park Attractions	Top Spin	1997	Sold
Top Spin Nº2	Bauer	Germany	HUSS Park Attractions	Top Spin 2	2001	Operating

=== Amusement parks ===
Name	Park	Country	Manufacturer	Model	Premiere	Status
Miner's Revenge; Formerly Colorado Rafting	Travelling carnival (1990); Gold Reef City (1999)	South Africa	HUSS Park Attractions	Top Spin	1990	Operating
Aqua Spin	Heide Park	Germany	HUSS Park Attractions	Top Spin	1992	Removed
Top Spin	Yokohama Dreamland	Japan	HUSS Park Attractions	Top Spin	1992	Removed
Hurakan	Tibidabo	Spain	HUSS Park Attractions	Top Spin	1992	Removed
Top Spin; Formerly Texas Twister	California's Great America; Geauga Lake	United States	HUSS Park Attractions	Top Spin	1993	Removed
Yukan Raft; Formerly Top Spin 2	Travelling carnival (1993); Fort Fun Abenteurland (2013)	Germany	HUSS Park Attractions	Top Spin 2	1993	Removed
Moon Chaser; Formerly Top Spin	Travelling carnival (1993); Adventureland Amusement Park (2024)	United States	HUSS Park Attractions	Top Spin 2	1993	In storage
GiraVolta; Formerly Top Spin	Miragica; Gardaland	Italy	HUSS Park Attractions	Top Spin	1993	Closed
Top Spin	Liseberg	Sweden	HUSS Park Attractions	Top Spin	1993	Removed
Top Spin	Parque de Atracciones de Madrid	Spain	HUSS Park Attractions	Top Spin	1993	Operating
Kieputin	Linnanmäki	Finland	HUSS Park Attractions	Top Spin	1994	Removed
Top Spin	Nagashima Spa Land	Japan	HUSS Park Attractions	Top Spin	1994	Removed
Top Spin; Formerly Rameses Revenge	Chessington World of Adventures (1995); Sindibad Parc (2025)	Morocco	HUSS Park Attractions	Top Spin	1995	Unknown
Shake, Rattle & Roll	Elitch Gardens	United States	HUSS Park Attractions	Top Spin	1995	Removed
Top Spin	La Feria de Chapultepec	Mexico	HUSS Park Attractions	Top Spin	1995	Removed
Top Spin	BenyLand	Japan	HUSS Park Attractions	Top Spin 2	1995	Removed
Gantu Top Spin	Serengeti Park	Germany	HUSS Park Attractions	Top Spin 2	1995	Removed
Top Spin Nº1	Travelling carnival (1996); Baghdad Island Park (2016)	Iraq	HUSS Park Attractions	Top Spin 2	1996	Operating
Waterspin	Duinrell	Netherlands	HUSS Park Attractions	Top Spin	1996	Operating
La Tornade	La Ronde	Canada	HUSS Park Attractions	Top Spin	1997	Removed
Top Spin	Seoul Land	South Korea	HUSS Park Attractions	Top Spin	1997	Operating
Twister	Six Flags New England	United States	HUSS Park Attractions	Top Spin	1997	Removed
Ripsaw	Alton Towers	United Kingdom	HUSS Park Attractions	Top Spin	1997	Removed
Top Spin	Toshimaen (1997); Wurstelprater (2007); EsselWorld (2013)	India	HUSS Park Attractions	Top Spin	1997	Unknown
Top Spin	Travelling carnival (1997); Fantasilandia (2004)	Chile	HUSS Park Attractions	Top Spin	1997	Operating
VooDoo	Six Flags Discovery Kingdom	United States	HUSS Park Attractions	Top Spin	1998	Removed
Der Twister	Six Flags Fiesta Texas	United States	HUSS Park Attractions	Top Spin	1998	Removed
Galactic Spin	Lihpao Land	Taiwan	HUSS Park Attractions	Top Spin	1998	Operating
Top Spin	Happy Valley Shenzhen	China	HUSS Park Attractions	Top Spin	1998	Operating
Hang Time	Dorney Park	United States	HUSS Park Attractions	Top Spin	1998	Removed
Montezuma's Revenge	Avonturenpark Hellendoorn (1998) Niagara Amusement Park & Splash World (2021)	Netherlands	HUSS Park Attractions	Top Spin 2	1998	In storage
Ultimate Fun (勁爆樂翻天)	Janfusun Fancyworld	Taiwan	HUSS Park Attractions	Top Spin	Unknown	Removed
Top Spin	Expoland	Japan	HUSS Park Attractions	Top Spin	Unknown	Removed
NYC Transformer	Movie Park Germany	Germany	HUSS Park Attractions	Top Spin	1999	Operating
Top Spin	E-World	South Korea	HUSS Park Attractions	Top Spin	1999	Removed
The Candy	Luna Park, Tel Aviv	Israel	HUSS Park Attractions	Top Spin	1999	Closed
Ekatomb	Hopi Hari	Brazil	HUSS Park Attractions	Top Spin	1999	Operating
Top Spin	Dream Park	Egypt	HUSS Park Attractions	Top Spin	1999	Unknown
Top Spin	Dreamland Nara	Japan	HUSS Park Attractions	Top Spin	1999	Removed
Twister	Six Flags Great Adventure	United States	HUSS Park Attractions	Top Spin	1999	Removed
Hell's Gate	Playland	Canada	HUSS Park Attractions	Top Spin	2000	Operating
Hurricane	Dream World	Thailand	HUSS Park Attractions	Top Spin	2000	Operating
Twister	Six Flags Darien Lake	United States	HUSS Park Attractions	Top Spin	2000	Removed
Blast; Formerly Excalibur	Walibi Holland	Netherlands	HUSS Park Attractions	Top Spin	2000	Operating
Buzzsaw; Formerly Screamer	Walibi Belgium	Belgium	HUSS Park Attractions	Top Spin	2001	Operating
Estrugensen	Xetulul Theme Park	Guatemala	HUSS Park Attractions	Top Spin	2002	Operating
Lex Luthor Invertatron	Parque Warner Madrid	Spain	HUSS Park Attractions	Top Spin	2002	Operating
Perfect Storm	Happy Valley Shenzhen	China	HUSS Park Attractions	Top Spin	2002	Operating
The Crypt; Formerly Tomb Raider: The Ride	Kings Island	United States	HUSS Park Attractions	Giant Top Spin	2002	Removed
Thunderhawk	Worlds of Fun	United States	HUSS Park Attractions	Top Spin	2002	Removed
King Kahuna	Kennywood	United States	HUSS Park Attractions	Top Spin	2003	Removed
Double Rock Spin	Everland	South Korea	HUSS Park Attractions	Suspended Top Spin	2003	Operating
RipTide	Knott's Berry Farm	United States	HUSS Park Attractions	Suspended Top Spin	2004	Removed
Top Spin	Astroland	United States	HUSS Park Attractions	Top Spin 2	2004	Removed
Top Spin	Vidámpark	Hungary	HUSS Park Attractions	Top Spin	2004	Removed
King Chaos	Six Flags Great America (2004) Indiana Beach	United States	HUSS Park Attractions	Top Spin	2004	In storage
RipTide	Valleyfair	United States	HUSS Park Attractions	Suspended Top Spin	2005	Removed
The Crypt; Formerly Tomb Raider: Firefall	Kings Dominion	United States	HUSS Park Attractions	Suspended Top Spin	2005	Removed
Trojan Horse	Happy Valley Beijing	China	HUSS Park Attractions	Top Spin	2006	Removed
Top Spin	Harborland Ningbo	China	HUSS Park Attractions	Top Spin	2006	Removed
Talocan	Phantasialand	Germany	HUSS Park Attractions	Suspended Top Spin	2007	Operating
Tornado	Parque Diversiones	Costa Rica	HUSS Park Attractions	Top Spin	2010	Operating
Top Spin	Siam Amazing Park	Thailand	HUSS Park Attractions	Top Spin	2010	Unknown
Top Spin	Funtown Splashtown USA	United States	HUSS Park Attractions	Top Spin 2	2012	Unknown
Perfect Storm	Happy Valley Wuhan	China	HUSS Park Attractions	Top Spin	2012	Operating
Splash Spin	Romon U-Park	China	HUSS Park Attractions	Suspended Top Spin	2014	Operating
Digging in the Mountain	Hefei Wanda Theme Park	China	HUSS Park Attractions	Suspended Top Spin	2016	Operating
Thor Thunder Spin Ride	IMG Worlds of Adventure	United Arab Emirates	HUSS Park Attractions	Suspended Top Spin	2016	Out of service
Monster Spin	Dragon Park Ha Long	Vietnam	HUSS Park Attractions	Suspended Top Spin	2017	Operating
Top Spin	Magic Mountain	India	HUSS Park Attractions	Suspended Top Spin	2019	Operating
Temple of Fire (Храм огня)	Dream Island	Russia	HUSS Park Attractions	Suspended Top Spin	2020	Operating
Vortex	Sea World	Australia	HUSS Park Attractions	Suspended Top Spin	2020	Operating
Unknown	Chongqing Locajoy Theme Park	China	HUSS Park Attractions	Suspended Top Spin	2020	Operating
Perfect Storm	Happy Valley Nanjing	China	HUSS Park Attractions	Suspended Top Spin	2023	Operating
Toxicator	Alton Towers	United Kingdom	HUSS Park Attractions	Suspended Top Spin	2025	Operating
Perfect Storm	OCT Fantasy Valley Xiangyang	China	HUSS Park Attractions	Suspended Top Spin	2025	Operating
Unknown	Unknown	China	HUSS Park Attractions	Suspended Top Spin	2026	Under construction

=== Variations ===
Name	Owner	Country	Manufacturer	Model	Premiere	Status
The Storm	Morey's Piers	United States	Moser's Rides	Super Loop on Top	1999	Removed
Lex Luthor's Invertatron	Six Flags New Orleans	United States	Moser's Rides	Super Loop on Top	2003	Removed
Splash Over	Adventureland	United States	Moser's Rides	Maverick	2006	Removed
La Cólera de Akiles	Terra Mitica	Spain	Mondial	Super Nova	2006	Operating
Tomb Raider Machine	Movieland Park	Italy	Zamperla	Windshear	2007	Removed
Tornado	Dunia Fantasi	Indonesia	Zamperla	Windshear	2007	Operating
Splash Over	Happy Valley Chengdu	China	Mondial	Splash Over	2009	Operating
Vortigo	Etnaland	Italy	Zamperla	Windshear	2013	Operating
Demon	La Ronde	Canada	Mondial	Roll Over	2014	Operating
Apocalypto	Energylandia	Poland	Fabbri Group	Dragon Fly	2014	Operating
Twister	Lake Winnepesaukah	United States	Moser's Rides	Maverick	2016	Operating
Galeon	Land of Legends Theme Park	Turkey	Moser's Rides	Loop On Top	2018	Operating
Rokava	Lost Island Theme Park	United States	Moser's Rides	Maverick	2022	Operating
Luna Swing	Space World	Japan	Vekoma	Waikiki Wave Super Flip	Unknown	Removed
Desorbitados	Parque de la Costa	Argentina	Preston & Barbieri	Suspended Top Spin	Unknown	Operating
Apocalipsis	Salitre Mágico	Colombia	Moser's Rides	Top Loop	Unknown	Operating
Flying Tornado	Jawa Timur Park	Indonesia	Moser's Rides	Maverick	Unknown	Operating
Salto	Eram Amusement Park	Iran	Unknown	Unknown	Unknown	Operating
Waikiki Wave	Beijing Shijingshan Amusement Park	China	Vekoma	Waikiki Wave	Unknown	Operating
Top Gun	VGP Universal Kingdom	India	Moser's Rides	Top Gun	Unknown	Operating
Thor's Anger	Hangzhou Paradise	China	Unknown	Unknown	Unknown	Out of service
Twisting in Waves	Quancheng Euro Park	China	Unknown	Unknown	Unknown	Operating
Revolution	Parque de Atracciones de Zaragoza	Spain	Atracciones Lorente	Top Spin	Unknown	Operating

== See also ==
- Ali Baba (ride)
- Rainbow (ride)
