= Croc Drop (ride) =

Amusement park ride in London, United Kingdom

Coordinates: 51.34895°N 0.31861°W

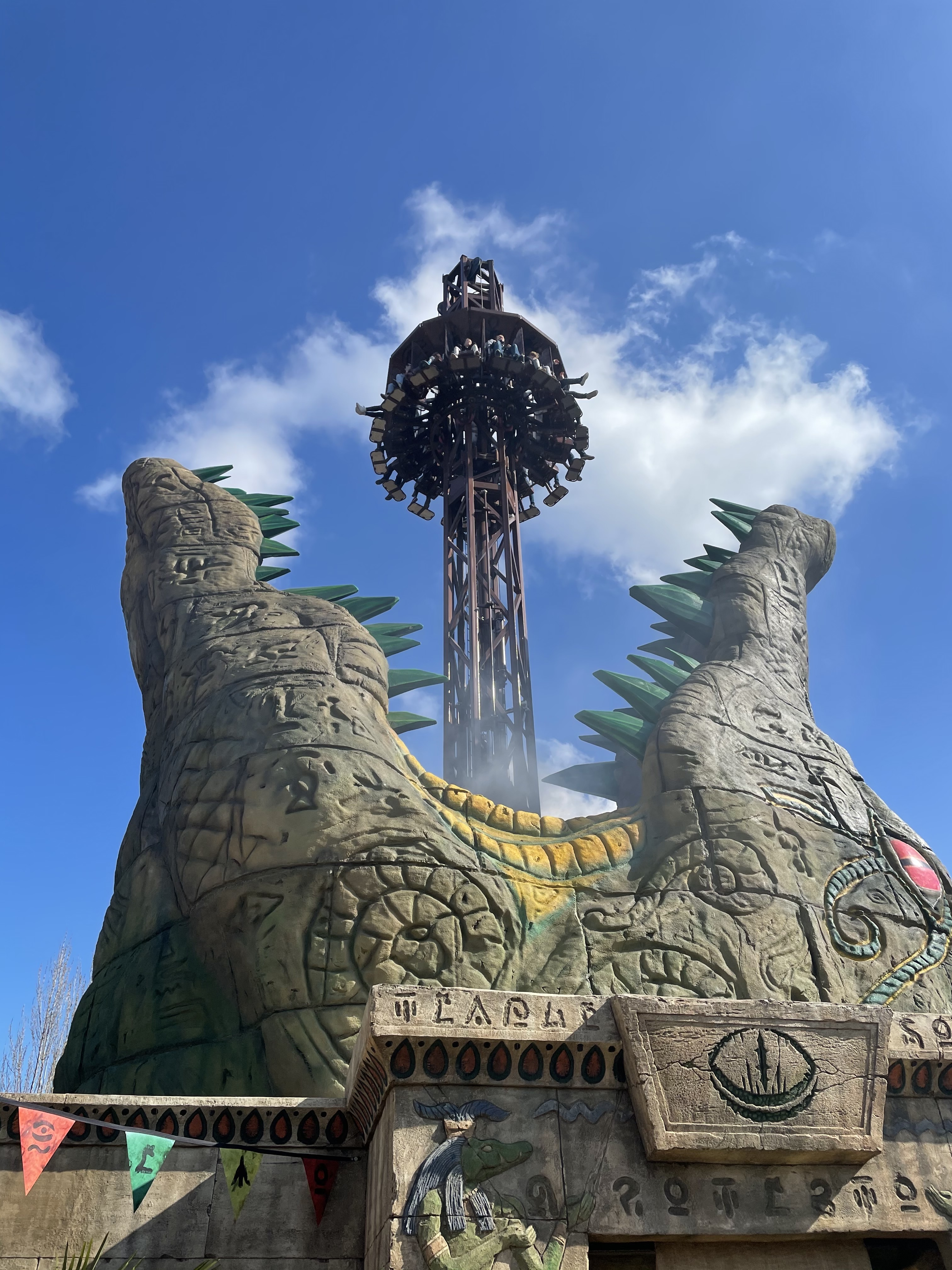

Chessington World of Adventures
- Area: Forbidden Kingdom
- Status: Operating
- Cost: £900,000
- Opening date: 12 April 2021; 5 years ago
- Replaced: Rameses Revenge

Ride statistics
- Manufacturer: SBF Visa Group
- Designer: Merlin Magic Making
- Model: Drop'n Twist Tower
- Theme: Sobek
- Height: 25.6 m (84 ft)
- Height restriction: 120 cm (3 ft 11 in)
- Reserve and Ride available
- Wheelchair accessible

Croc Drop is an SBF Visa drop tower attraction that opened in April 2021 at Chessington World of Adventures Resort in Greater London, United Kingdom. Located within the Forbidden Kingdom section of the park, the ride features a central tower integrated into a large-scale stylised crocodile head.

== History ==
Following the closure of Rameses Revenge at the conclusion of the 2019 season, plans were revealed for a multi-million pound replacement drop tower. The attraction opened two years later for the 2021 season in the Forbidden Kingdom area, debuting alongside the Blue Barnacle pirate ship. Manufactured by the SBF Visa Group, the ride is the third of its model type in the United Kingdom, following Skyraker 001 at Flambards and Magma at Paultons Park. Croc Drop represents the first entirely new ride hardware installation at Chessington since the opening of Kobra in 2010.

In 2020, the American footwear manufacturer Crocs filed an opposition against the trademarking of the ride's name. The UK Intellectual Property Office ultimately dismissed the challenge, ruling in favor of the resort and allowing the Croc Drop title to be retained.

== Description ==
The 16-seat gondola is elevated to the top of a vertical structure before being released into a free-fall. The descent is moderated by a braking system as the gondola approaches the base. This specific installation enhances the traditional format by incorporating rotating gondolas and a series of bounces prior to the conclusion of the cycle. The ride has a total weight of approximately 26,000 kg and operates at a rotational speed of 6 rpm.

The ride's soundtrack was produced by Nick Hutson.

Riders descend 25 metres into the stylised jaws of Sobek, the ancient Egyptian crocodile god and protector of the Nile. The attraction’s narrative depicts Sobek as having been possessed by evil spirits, transforming the once-benevolent protector into a cruel deity and leaving the Nile stagnant. To restore the river's fertility, riders participate in a ceremony to banish these spirits by plunging into the crocodile’s soul. Throughout 2020, Chessington supported the launch with a teaser campaign on social media, utilising a series of cryptic clues to build anticipation for the new attraction.

Those between 1.2m and 1.3m must be accompanied by an adult over the age of 16, while those over the minimum height of 1.3m can ‘drop’ alone.

== Gallery ==
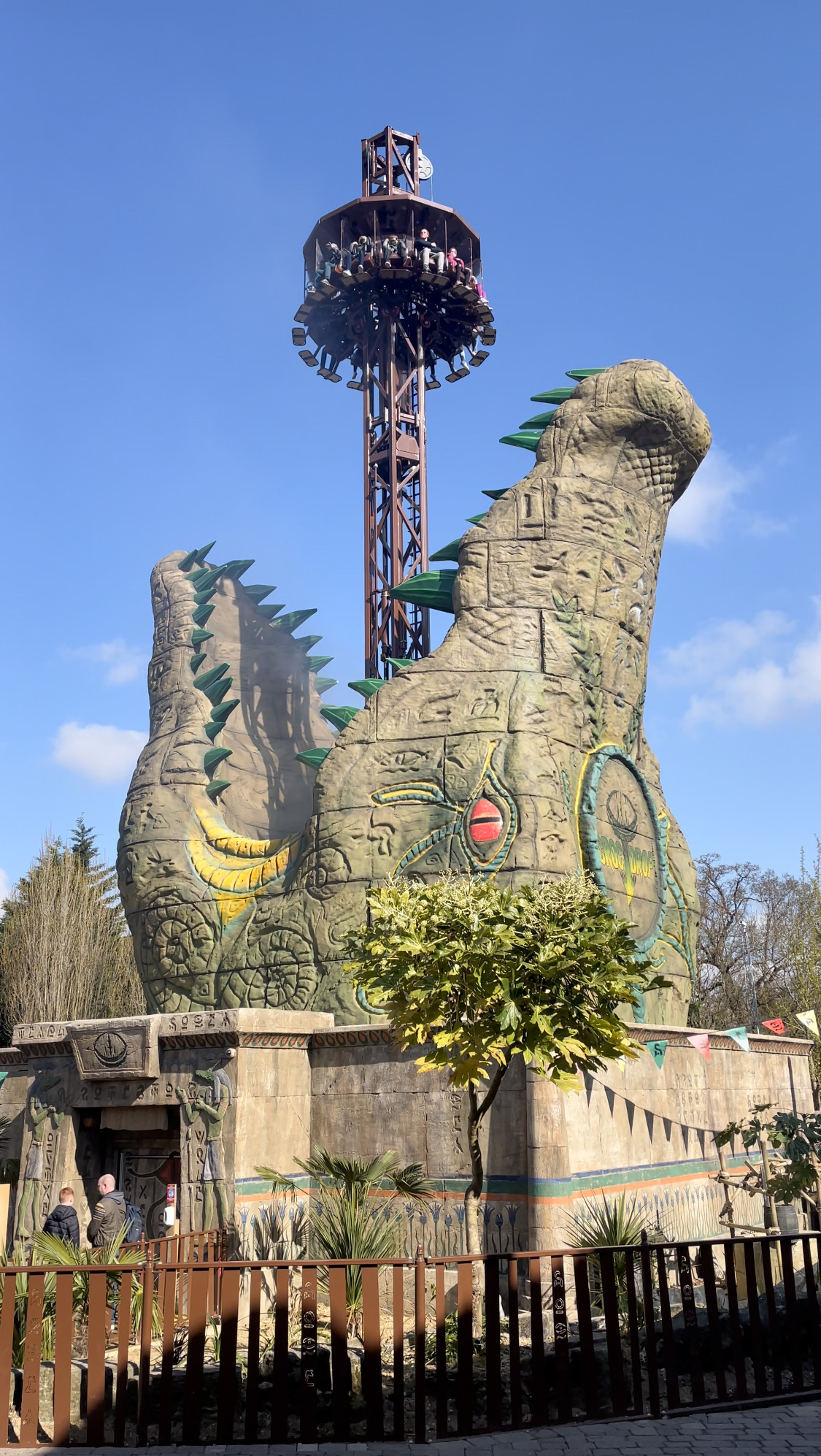
Croc Drop completed ride in motion.

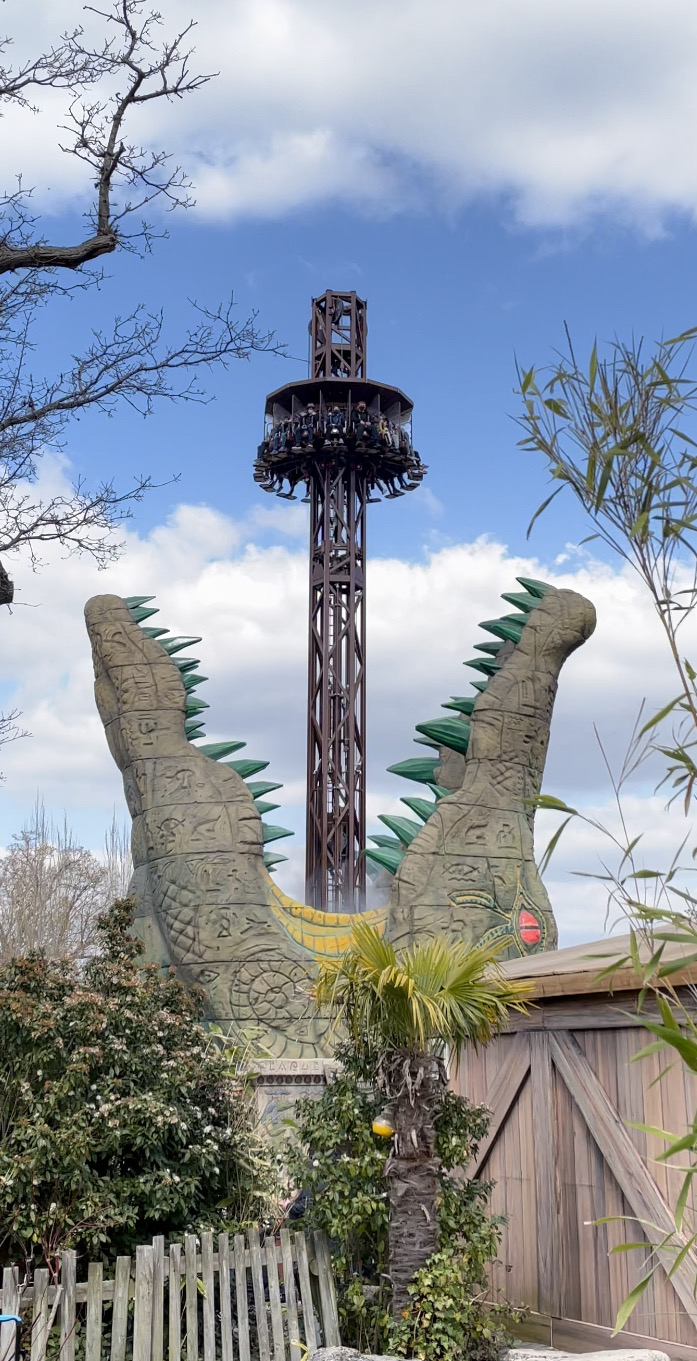
Croc Drop significantly changes Chessington's skyline.

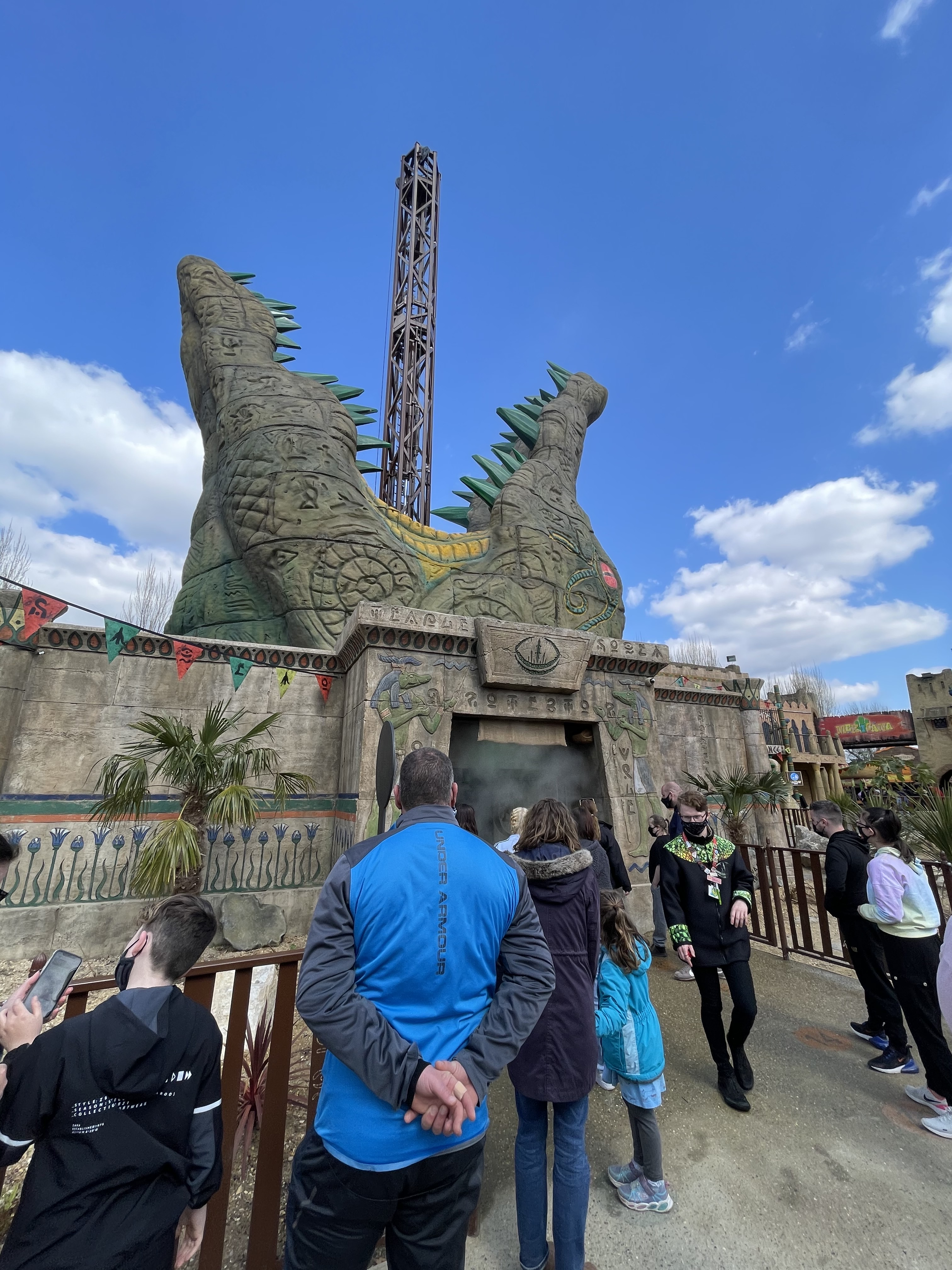
Croc Drop's batching area and doors opening with smoke.

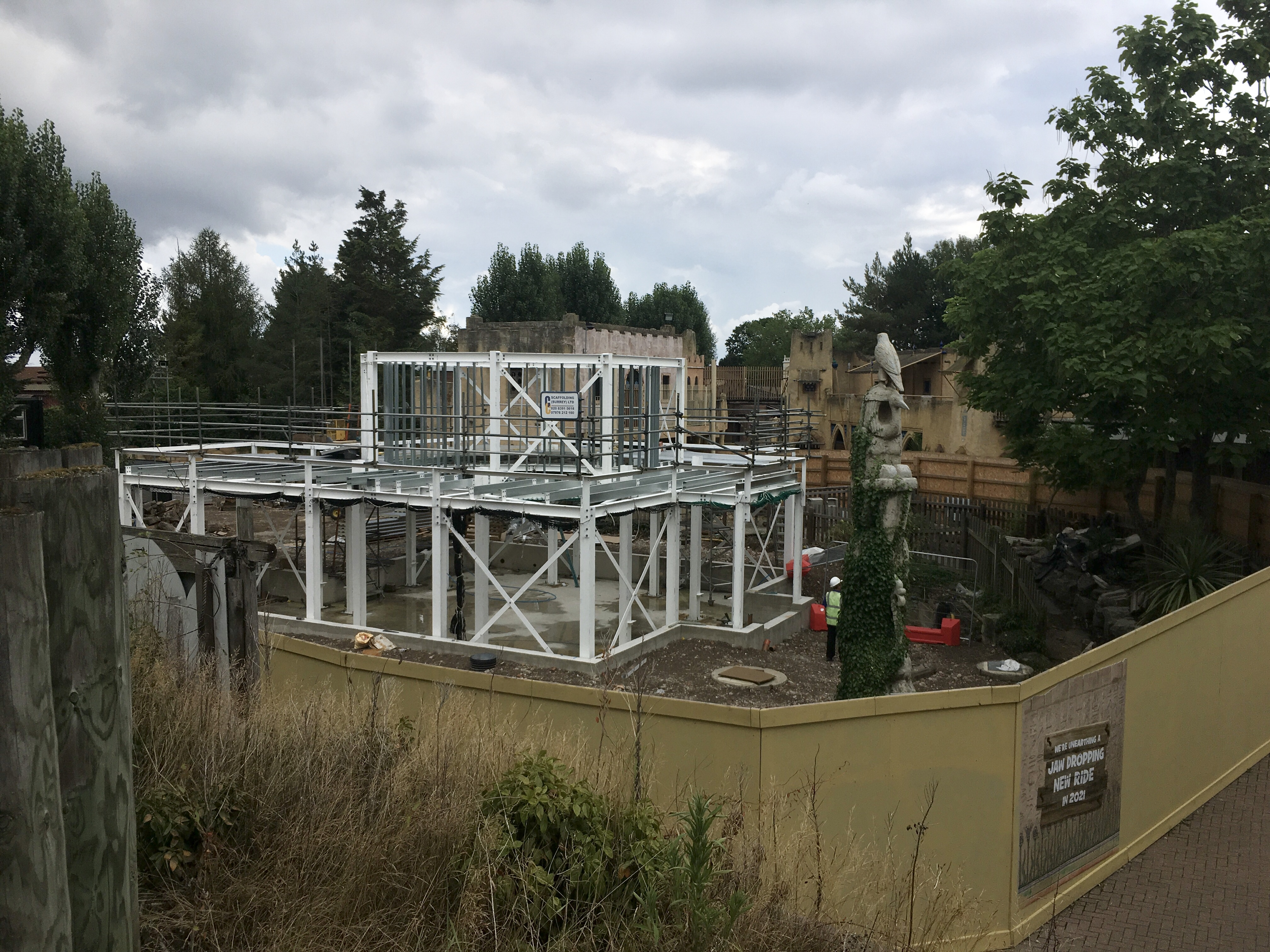
Ride during early construction.
