= Crealy Theme Park & Resort =

Amusement park in England

- Previously known as Crealy the Great Farm Adventure (1989–1992); Crealy Country; Crealy Adventure Park & Resort
- Interactive map of Crealy Theme Park & Resort
- Location: Exeter, Devon, United Kingdom
- Coordinates: 50°42′20″N 3°24′58″W
- Status: Operating
- Opened: 1989; 37 years ago
- Operated by: Maximum Fun Devon Limited
- Slogan: The biggest family Theme Park in Devon!
- Operating season: Every day through summer season, reduced hours during winter.
- Area: More than 100 acres (40 ha)

Attractions
- Total: 21
- Website: Official website

Crealy Theme Park & Resort, formerly Crealy Adventure Park & Resort, is a family theme park in Southwest England with over 60 rides, attractions, live shows, animal attractions and Sooty Land. Just outside Exeter in over 100 acres of countryside, it also has a large lodge, campsites and variety of entertainment and sport facilities. The park opened in 1989.

== History ==
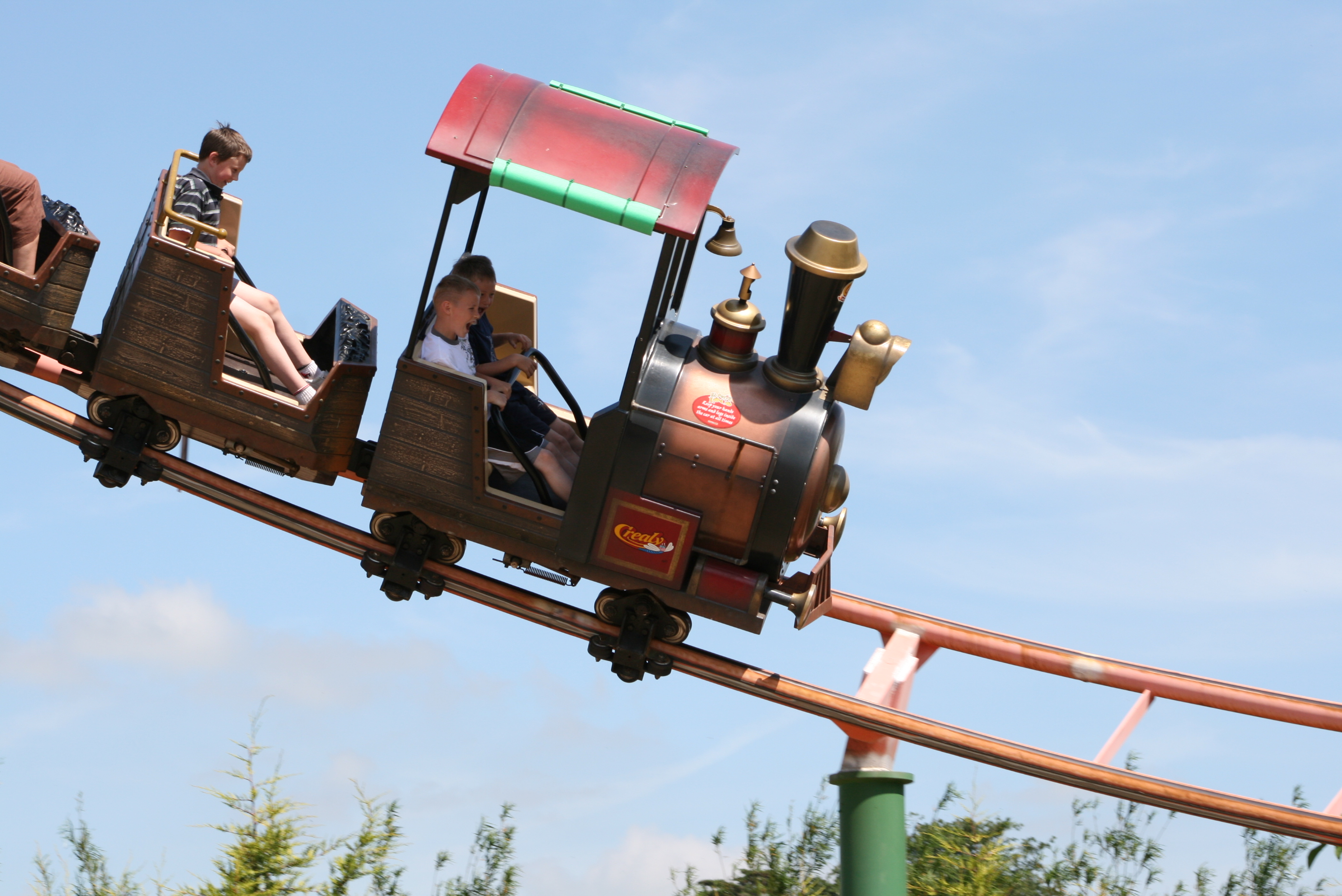
Rollercoaster

The land for Crealy Theme Park & Resort was bought from King's College, Cambridge in 1982. Its first visitors arrived in 1988 when it was operating as a farm, coming to see the cows being milked using its state-of-the-art dairy unit. It officially opened in 1989 as a working farm, Crealy the Great Farm Adventure, the same year its restaurant and Treetops playground were opened.

In 1992, the name of the park changed to Crealy Country and more attractions were introduced, including quad bikes and the bumper boat lake.

In 1994, the cows were sold so that their barns could be used for undercover attractions. The next year, the Adventure Zone was opened.

In 1997, the Magical Kingdom (formerly Buddy Bear's Kingdom and now The Pier) was opened.

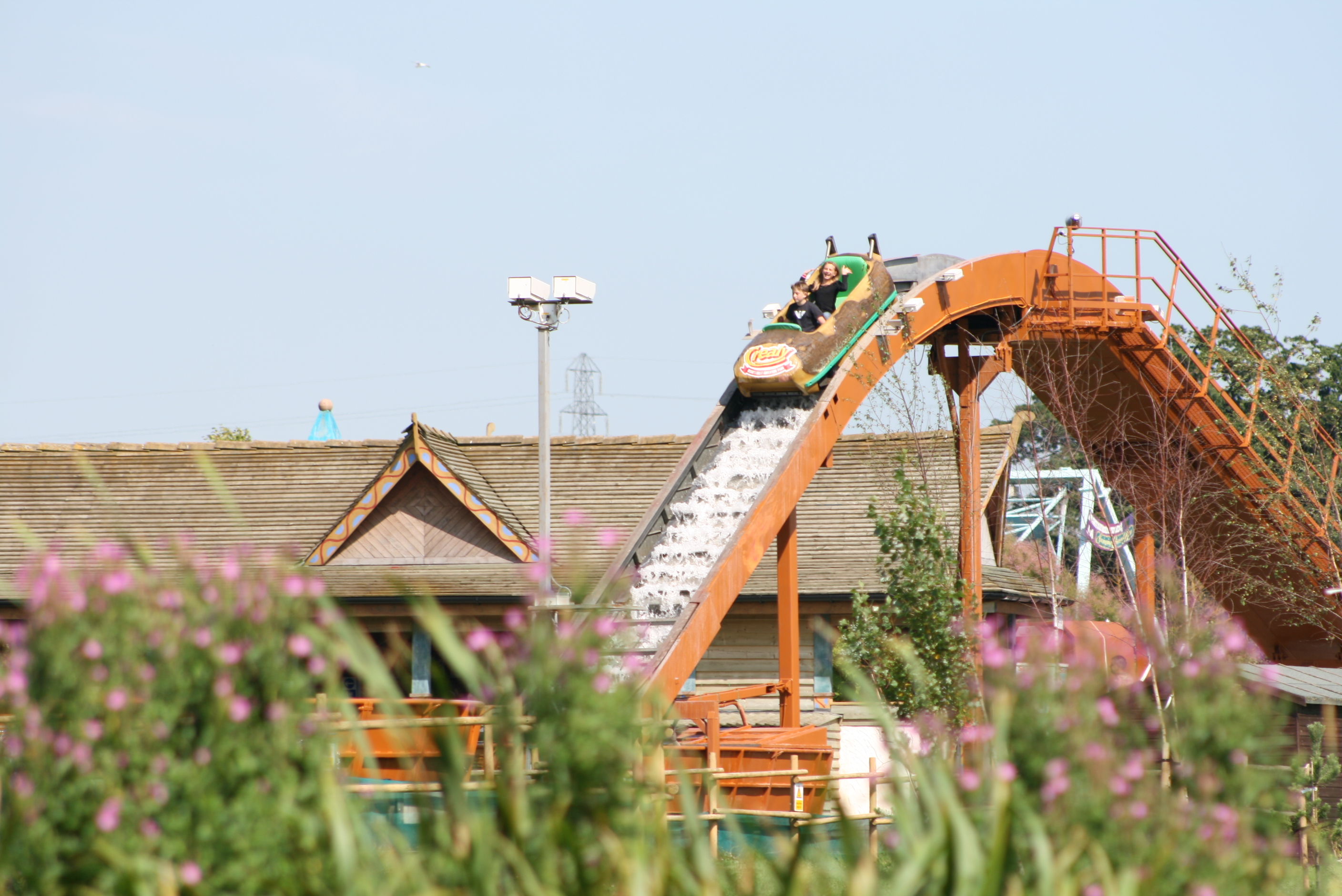
Water chute

In 2000 the park's first rollercoaster was added – a Vekoma Junior Coaster called Maximus. Further rollercoasters were added in 2014 and 2015. Its 2015 addition, Twister Rollercoaster, a spinning wild mouse, is the largest ride in the park.

In 2011, following some refurbishments, Devon County Council granted owners Maximum Fun a licence to keep various exotic animals and operate Crealy as a zoo. The first animals to be exhibited were Meerkats.

In 2012, the park opened accommodation nearby at Crealy Meadows Caravan and Camping Park. Now known as Crealy Meadows, the site offers camping and caravan pitches, themed tents, and luxury lodges and glamping.

In February 2022, the park announced the opening of a Sooty-themed area for the May Half Term. It features four rides, a themed store, other themed attractions and a live show. It opened on 28 May 2022.

In August 2025, the park announced a new pirate-themed family thrill ride to open in Spring 2026. Later revealed to be called Pirate's Plummet, and is a relocated Magma from Paultons Park, as verified from on-site construction photos. Later in September, a second ride was announced to be coming to the park the same year, also being a Flat ride and having an inversion, making it the only inverting ride in Devon.

Presently Crealy has over 60 rides, attractions and live shows. These include thrill rides, rollercoasters, water rides, and indoor and outdoor play areas. The Animal Barn houses zoo and farm animals.

#	Name	Manufacturer	Opened	Description
1	Pirate's Plumet	SBF Visa	2026	Drop ride in themed pirate area. Spins while dropping riders multiple times.
2	Sooty's Magic Bus	Zamperla	2022	Colourful bus with views across the land. Closed until an unknown point, removed from Crealy's website
3	Soo's Sweet Balloon Ride	Zamperla	2022	Colourful balloons and views of Sooty Land
4	Sweeps' Flying Circus	SBF/VISA	2022	Circus themed planes, peaceful flight, view below
5	Izzy Wizzy Let's Get Dizzy	Moser's rides	2022	Colourful cars and famous spell, "Izzy Wizzy, Let's Get Dizzy!"
6	The Jolly Roger	Zamperla	2017	Rocking and spinning pirate ship
7	The Junior Driving School	World of Rides	2017	Tricky course for young guests, with twists and turns
8	Twister Rollercoaster	SBF/VISA	2015	Twisting track, three hundred metres long, twelve metres high
9	Dino Jeeps	Zamperla	2014	Family exploration area
10	Seacups	SBF/VISA	2014	Aquatic ride hosted by King Neptune
11	Shark Bay Coaster	SBF/VISA	2014	Junior indoor coaster, located in Lost World of Atlantis
12	Supersubs	SBF/VISA	2014	Enjoyable underwater world
13	The Flying Machine	Zamperla	2014	Family-friendly machine, goes high
14	Safari Express	SBF/VISA	2013	Family ride, potentially visible animals
15	Crealy Grand Prix	Formula K – Go Karts	2011	Four-wheeled multiplayer game
16	Vortex Water Coaster	Van Egdom	2010	World's first triple tube water coaster
17	Dolphin Drop	Zamperla	2008	Ride with dolphins and propulsion to ocean surface
18	Tidal Wave Log Flume	L&T Systems	2008	Double drop high speed water slide into dark water
19	Victorian Carousel	Walker	2003	Most beautiful ride, built around 1884, slow
20	Flying Dutchman	Metalbau	2000	Swing, swoops low
21	Maximus Rollercoaster	Vekoma	2000	Departs from "ancient Roman buildings"
22	Aqua Blasters	JJ Amusements	1992	Bumper boat in lagoon with fast-pumping water cannon

== Camel Creek Adventure Park ==
Terry Sandling bought Trelow Farm in Tredinnick and opened the property to the public in 1989 as The Shire Horse Centre. The property was then sold to Crealy Great Adventure Parks in 2004, and was branded as Cornwall's Crealy. Following an acquisition in 2015, John Broome CBE purchased Cornwall's Crealy and rebranded it as Camel Creek Adventure Park. The park attracts approximately 200,000 people a year.

Major rides include the new 5D Simulator, Morgawr, The Beast, Raging River and Thunder Falls. Camel Creek targets younger children up to the age of six. Swampy and Dina are resident characters.
