= Cliff's Amusement Park =

Amusement park in Albuquerque, New Mexico

- Previously known as Uncle Cliff's Kiddieland (1959–1963); Uncle Cliff's Familyland (1963–1980s); Uncle Cliff's Amusement Park (1980s–1991)

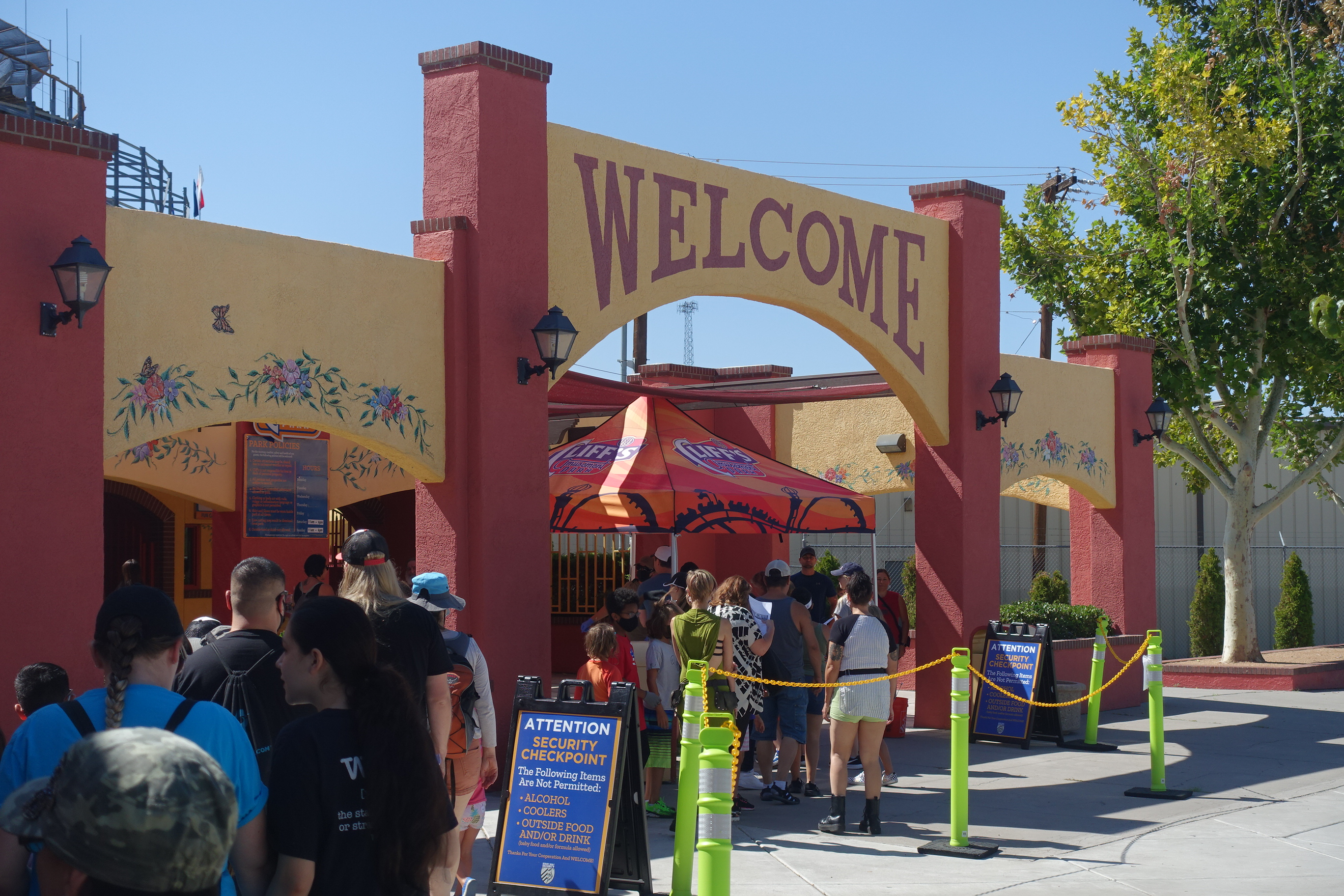
- Interactive map of Cliff's Amusement Park
- Location: 4800 Osuna Road NE, Albuquerque, New Mexico
- Coordinates: 35.14494°N 106.58938°W
- Status: Operating
- Opened: 1959
- Operating season: May through September
- Area: 15 acres (6.1 ha)

Attractions
- Total: 25
- Roller coasters: 3
- Water rides: 4
- Website: www.cliffsamusementpark.com

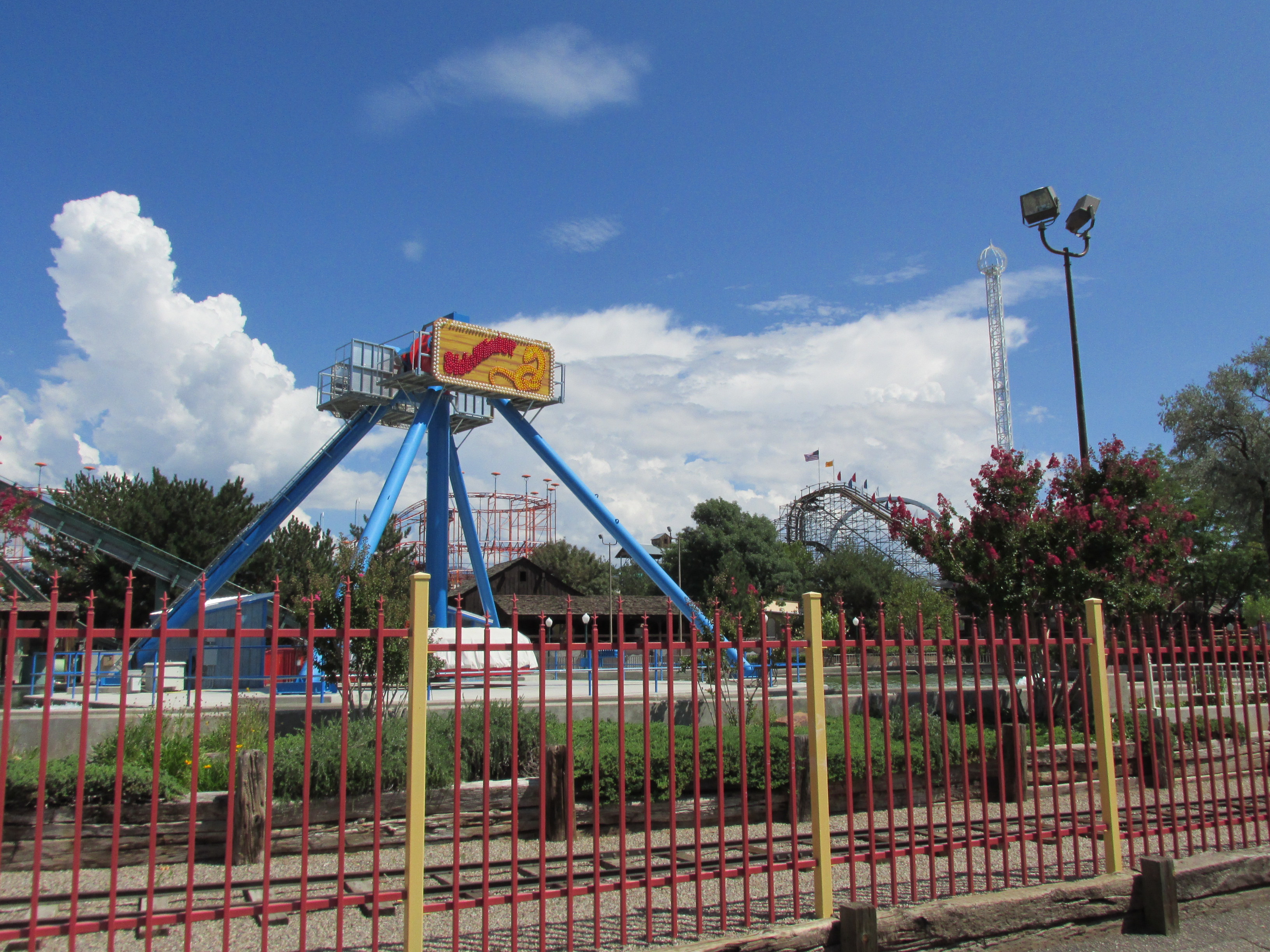
Sidewinder in 2013

Cliff's Amusement Park is an amusement and water park in Albuquerque, New Mexico. It opened in 1959 and was owned by Cliff and Zella Hammond. It features 25 rides, as well as food and games. The park is home to the only wooden roller coaster in the state of New Mexico and the final coaster designed by Custom Coasters International, The New Mexico Rattler.

== History ==
Husband and wife Cliff and Zella Hammond built a small children's amusement park in 1959 and named it Uncle Cliff’s Kiddieland. After a few years of operation at this location, neighbors of the park began a petition to have the park shut down. The park relocated for a short time to Little Beavertown in Tijeras Canyon outside Albuquerque.

In 1963, the park relocated to its present location in Albuquerque. Its name was changed to Uncle Cliff's Familyland. In 1974, the Hammond's daughter and her husband began to manage operations of the park. In the 1980s, the name was changed once again to Uncle Cliff's Amusement Park to reflect a pivot to amusement for all ages. In 2013, Cliff Hammond died. The park did not operate during 2020 due to the COVID-19 pandemic, but returned to operations the following year.

== Current rides ==
=== Roller coasters ===
Image	Name	Opened	Manufacturer	Description
	Galaxi	1977	S.D.C.	Steel Galaxi roller coaster
	Spin-O-Rama	2016	SBF Visa Group	Steel spinning children's roller coaster
	The New Mexico Rattler	2002	Custom Coasters International, in-house	Hybrid wooden roller coaster

=== Thrill rides ===
Name	Opened	Manufacturer	Description
Air Race	2025	Zamperla	Air Race
Around The World	2026	Unknown	Ali Baba
Cliff Hanger	2005	A.R.M. Rides, Larson International	Drop tower
Downdraft	2019	Dartron	Downdraft
Falling Star	2005	Chance Rides	Falling Star
Fireball	2013	Larson International	Fire Ball
Musik Express	2005	Mack Rides	Music Express
Rocky Mountain Rapids	Unknown	Hopkins Rides	Log flume
Sidewinder	2007	Moser's Rides	Frisbee
Wind Rider	2012	A.R.M. Rides	Swing ride

=== Family rides ===
Name	Opened	Manufacturer	Description
Bumper Cars/Demolition Disco	1970	Soli	Bumper cars
Carousel	1970	Chance Rides	Carousel
Tilt-A-Whirl	1980	Sellner Manufacturing	Tilt-A-Whirl
Train	1975	Chance Rides	Miniature train
Sea Dragon	1999	Chance Rides	Swinging ship

=== Children's rides ===
Name	Opened	Manufacturer	Description
Doggie-Go-Round	2012	SBF Visa Group	Spinning ride
Drop n Twist	2023	SBF Visa Group	Miniature drop tower
Happy Swing	2012	Zamperla	Happy Swing
Kiddy Bumper Cars	1980	Soli	Miniature bumper cars

=== WaterMania water park ===
Name	Manufacturer	Description
Big Flush	WhiteWater West	Two water slides
Lil Squirts	In-house	Children's water play area
Mega Water Monkeys	WhiteWater West	Children's water play area

== Former rides ==
Name	Opened	Closed	Manufacturer	Description
Coaster	1959	Unknown	B.A. Schiff & Associates	Steel children's roller coaster
Mad Mouse	1964	1981	Allan Herschell Company	Steel wild mouse roller coaster
Rock-O-Plane	Unknown	2012	Eyerly Aircraft Company	Rock-O-Plane
Yo-Yo	Unknown	2006	Chance Rides	Swing ride
Paratrooper	Unknown	Unknown	Frank Hrubetz & Company	Paratrooper
The Balloon Wheel	1999	2024	Satori	Miniature Ferris wheel
Scrambler	Unknown	2011	Eli Bridge Company	Scrambler
