= Alisher Navoi National Park =

Large public park located in Tashkent, Uzbekstan

Alisher Navoi National Park (Uzbek: Alisher Navoiy nomli Oʻzbekiston Milliy bogʻi) is a large park located in the Chilanzar (or Chilonzor) district, in the city center of Tashkent, Uzbekistan. It is commonly referred to as Milliy Bog.

== Location ==
The park is located in the Chilanzar District of Tashkent. There are three entrances to the park. One is located near Almazar Street and Besh Agach Square through Magic City. A second is near the Milliy Bog (Tashkent Metro) station, which has had the same name since 2005. And the third is via a large arch from the side of Seulskaya Street (formerly known as Baynalmilal Street).

The park is also near the State Museum of History of Uzbekistan, the Oliy Majlis, the Abulkasym Madrassah, the Peoples' Friendship Palace and the Writers' Union of Uzbekistan.

== History ==
The park was originally constructed on the site of a clay quarry for a brick factory in the 1930s (1932-1939) by the Komsomol, or All-Union Leninist Young Communist League using hashar or volunteer labor provided for the good of society. When the park officially opened in 1939, it was called the I. V. Stalin Park of Culture and Leisure. Following the October 1961 meeting of the Communist Party of the Soviet Union, the name of the park was changed to the Lenin Komsomol Central Park of Culture and Recreation and the lake was known as Komsomolskoye Lake. On September 22, 1991, by the decree of the Tashkent City Executive Committee, the Central Park of Recreation and Culture Beshagach (the former Lenin Komsomol Park) was expanded, and its name was changed to the Alisher Navoi National Park of Uzbekistan in honor of the 550th anniversary of Alisher Navoi.

In September 2017 the Cabinet of Ministers of Uzbekistan adopted Resolution No. 694 entitled, "On measures to create a modern and high-tech cultural and recreational park in the city of Tashkent." Following the issuing of this resolution, the park was closed, several buildings were demolished and some trees were removed.

In August 2022, the park reopened. The former Komsomolskoye Lake had been drained and restored, albeit slightly smaller, about 40 thousand square meters. A special coating was put at the bottom to prevent drainage and to prevent the bottom from becoming muddy. Also, a beach for swimming was created in the same location where a beach had been previously. More than a thousand trees and about two hundred thousand shrubs were planted.

The memorial to Alisher Navoi was restored. Under a tall, open gazebo with blue ribbed dome supported by 8 columns stands an imposing statue of Alisher Navoi, the Timurid Empire era poet for whom the park is named. The Alley of Writers, which was created by presidential decree in 2017 starts here and has monuments and information about more than 20 different Uzbek writers, poets and scholars. Other features of the park include a trackless train, bouncy castles, playgrounds, bicycle paths and paddle boat, canoe and swan boat rentals.
