= Talocan (ride) =

Flat ride in Germany

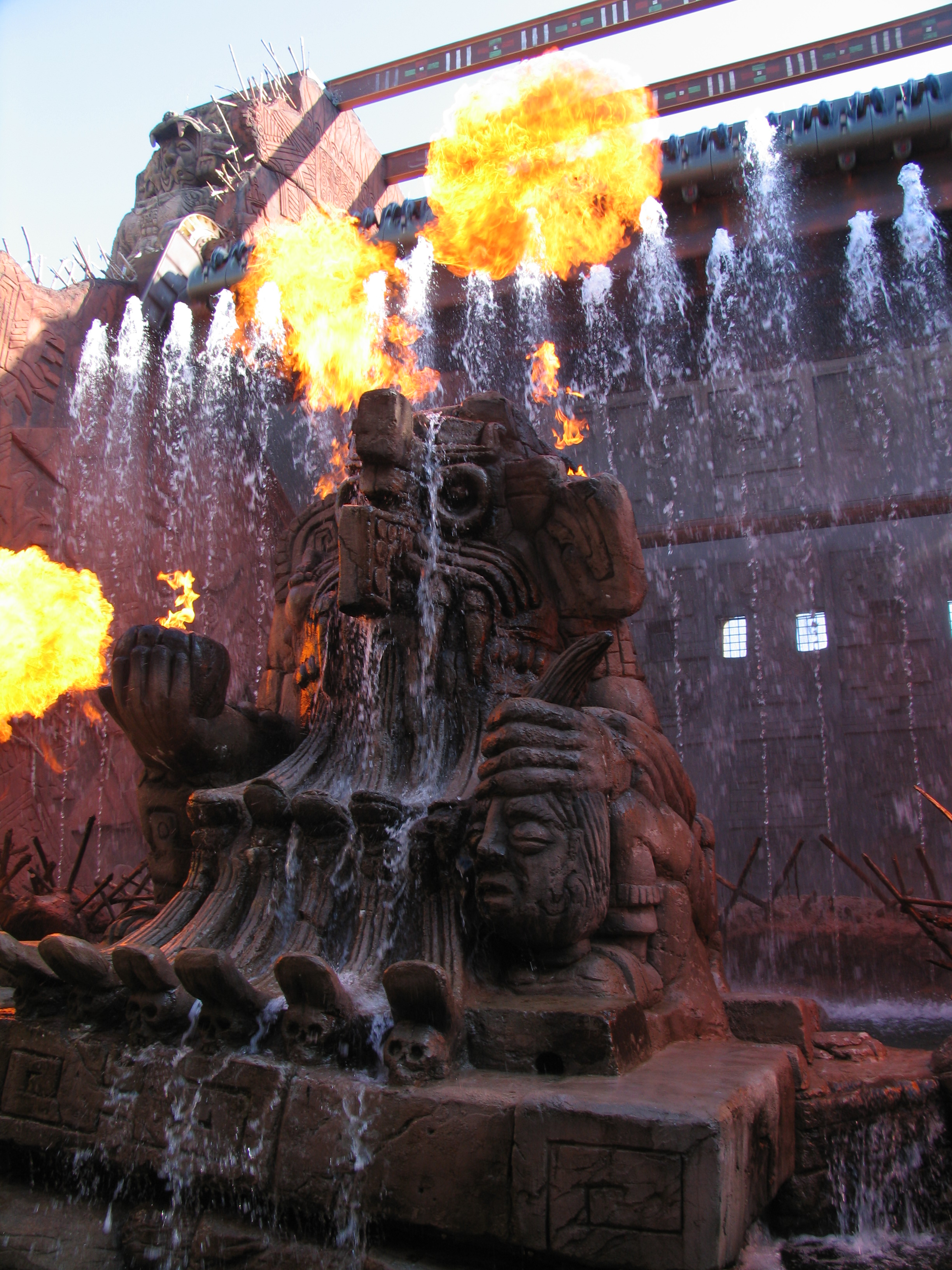

Phantasialand
- Area: Mexico
- Status: Operating
- Cost: €7.5 million
- Opening date: May 23, 2007
- Replaced: Condor

Ride statistics
- Attraction type: flat ride
- Manufacturer: HUSS Park Attractions
- Model: Top spin
- Height: 18 m (59 ft)
- G-force: 4
- Capacity: 900 riders per hour
- Riders per vehicle: 38
- Rows: 2
- Riders per row: 19

Talocan is a floorless suspended Top Spin amusement ride located at Phantasialand in Brühl, Germany. Manufactured by HUSS Park Attractions and opened in 2007, it was the first of its kind globally, evolving the traditional Top Spin design by removing the floor so that riders' legs hang freely during the experience. The attraction is situated within a highly detailed environment themed around the discovery of a hidden Aztec temple located in the cellar of a Mexican wine cooperative. Its name is derived from Aztec mythology, specifically referencing Tlalocan, the paradise of the rain and weather god Tlaloc.

== History ==
After the opening of Black Mamba in 2006, Phantasialand announced that a new ride named "Talocan" would be added to the park in 2007 in the space occupied by Condor. However, the ride type was not revealed until the 15 April 2007, when after months of construction, it would be announced as a new "Suspended Top Spin" style ride. The ride opened on 23 May 2007. In 2015, IMAScore created a new soundtrack to be used around the area and played during the ride cycle.

== Theme ==
The ride is themed around the discovery of an Aztec temple in the cellar of a wine cooperative in the fictional village "San Miguel Del Monte". While expanding the cellar into the base of a mountain it was located on, Pedro sees a skull in the rock. The mountain and back half of the cooperative was destroyed, revealing the Aztec temple the ride is located in. In the center of the temple area is a sculpture of Tlaloc, holding a burning flame. Water effects and fire effects are located in front of the Top Spin itself, with a viewing platform for guests to watch the ride.
