= Taleqan, West Azerbaijan =

Taleqan طالقان
- Village
- Location within Iran
- Coordinates: 36°59′46″N 45°26′18″E
- Country: Iran
- Province: West Azerbaijan
- County: Naqadeh
- Bakhsh: Mohammadyar
- Rural District: Hasanlu

Population (2006)
  - Total: 121
- Time zone: UTC+3:30 (IRST)
  - Summer (DST): UTC+4:30 (IRDT)

Taleqan (Persian: طالقان, also Romanized as Ţāleqān) is a village in Hasanlu Rural District, Mohammadyar District, Naqadeh County, West Azerbaijan Province, Iran. At the 2006 census, its population was 121, in 29 families.
