= Ripsaw (Alton Towers) =

Former ride at Alton Towers

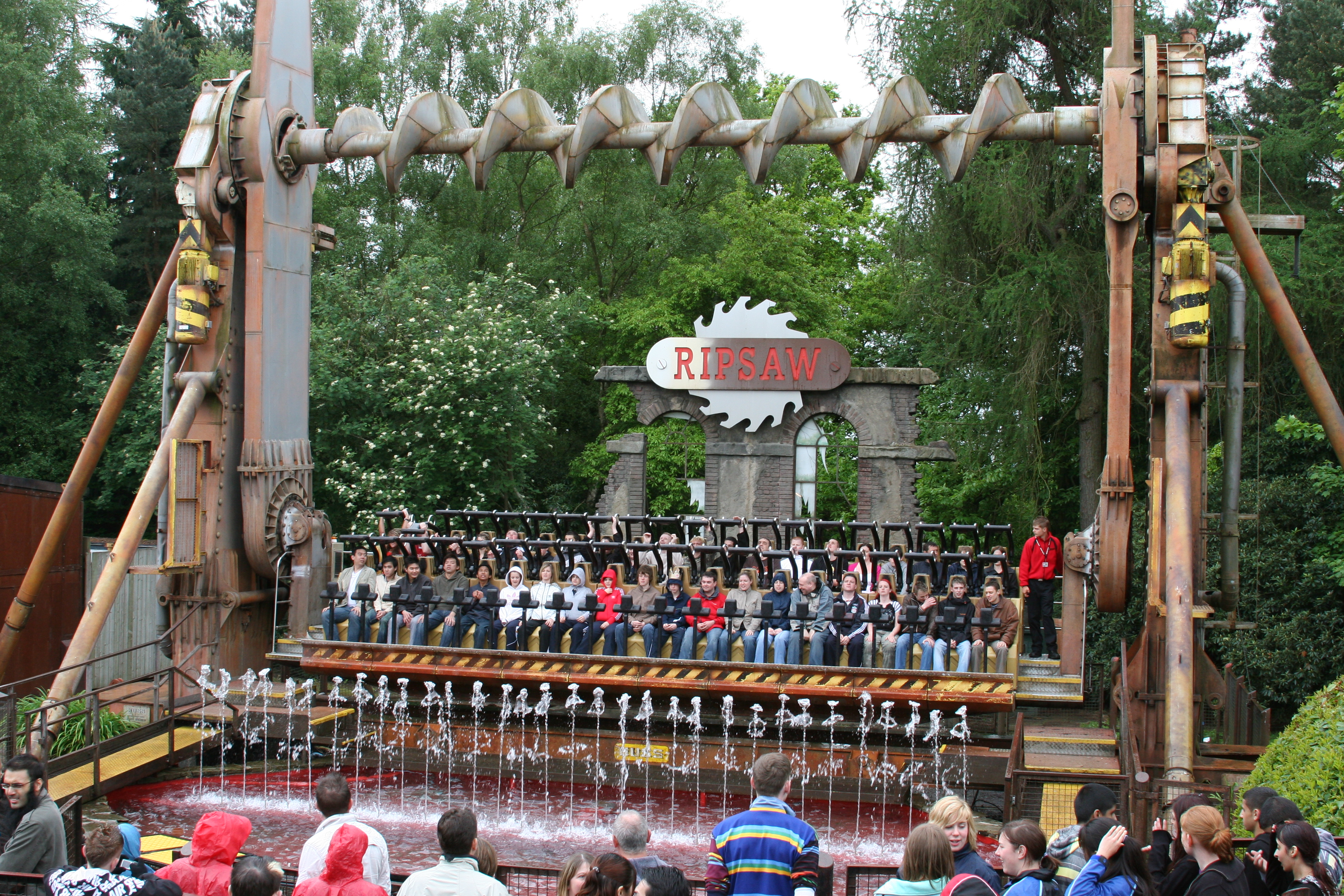

Alton Towers
- Area: Forbidden Valley
- Coordinates: 52°59′26″N 1°53′33″W
- Status: Removed
- Opening date: 15 March 1997
- Closing date: 8 November 2015
- Replaced by: Forbidden Sweep (2016); Funk'n'Fly (2021 – 2023); Toxicator (2025 – present)

Ride statistics
- Attraction type: Top Spin
- Manufacturer: HUSS Park Attractions
- Model: Top Spin Classic
- Height: 18 m (59 ft)
- G-force: 2.3
- Capacity: 855 riders per hour
- Riders per row: 20
- Duration: 2
- Height restriction: 55 in (140 cm)
- Restraint style: Over the shoulders

Ripsaw was a Top Spin ride previously located at Alton Towers Resort in Staffordshire, England. It opened in 1997 and closed at the end of 2015.

== History ==
The ride opened on 15 March 1997 alongside The Blade (which had been relocated and rethemed within the park) in the Forbidden Valley park section, replacing Thunder Looper, a Schwarzkopf Shuttle Loop roller coaster. It was just opposite of Nemesis in the park. The theming on and around the ride resembled that of heavy-duty machinery, with the main centrepiece of a ride being a large twist drill bit located above the riders.

Ripsaw was closed permanently following the 2015 season, its last day of operation being 8 November 2015. It was temporarily replaced by Forbidden Sweep, a small carnival game, during the 2016 season. In 2021, a ride called Funk‘n’Fly opened on the former Ripsaw site, on loan from the showman David Irvin. This ride was returned to its original fair circuit at the end of the 2021 season, but another ride of the same model was rented, and operated under the same name and in the same location following this. It closed at the end of the 2023 season, and returned to its original fair circuit as well.

In February 2024, Alton Towers submitted a planning application for a new 18 m (60 ft) tall ride on the site formerly occupied by Ripsaw. This prompted speculation from fans about the ride being a revival of Ripsaw. The ride was later revealed to be Toxicator, another Top Spin ride. Planning permission was approved in April 2024, and construction began in May 2024. The ride officially opened on 15 March 2025.

== Ride experience ==
Riders sat in a 20-seat, two-tier gondola attached to a pair of counterweighted rotating arms, making for a total capacity of 40 riders per cycle. The gondola was able to freely pivot or be held by pneumatic brakes at controlled times during the ride cycle. Riders were also suspended above rising jets of water, similar to Rameses Revenge at Chessington World of Adventures. The ride's successor, Toxicator, would replicate this feature with water jets of its own as well.
