= Toxicator =

Suspended top spin ride at Alton Towers, England

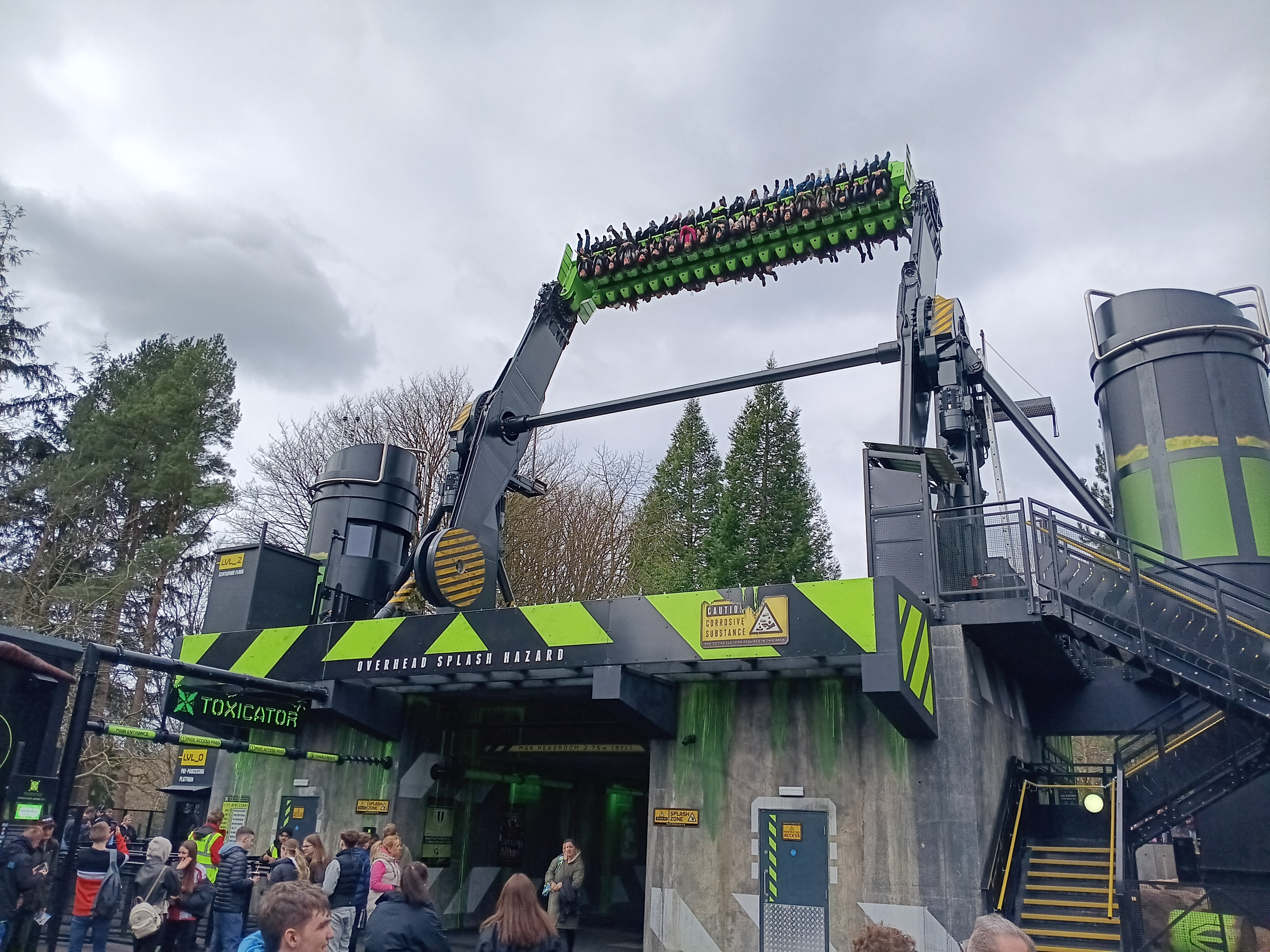

Alton Towers
- Area: Forbidden Valley
- Status: Operating
- Opening date: 15 March 2025
- Replaced: Ripsaw
- Fastrack available
- Single rider line available

Ride statistics
- Attraction type: Top Spin
- Manufacturer: HUSS Park Attractions
- Model: Top Spin Suspended
- Height: 78 ft (24 m)
- Capacity: 500 riders per hour
- Riders per vehicle: 38
- Rows: 2
- Riders per row: 19
- Height restriction: 140–195 cm (4 ft 7 in – 6 ft 5 in)
- Slogan: "Submit to the Spin"

Toxicator is a top spin ride at Alton Towers in Staffordshire, England. It opened on 15 March 2025.

It was the first top spin to be built in the UK since Ripsaw in 1997, raised on a 16 ft (4.9 m) platform elevated above a pathway.

== History ==
In February 2024, Alton Towers submitted a planning application for a new 60 ft (18 m) tall ride in the Forbidden Valley, codenamed 'Project Ocean', on the site previously occupied by Funk ‘n’ Fly (originally occupied by Ripsaw). Planning permission was approved in April 2024, and construction began in May 2024. The ride opened on 15 March 2025.

== Ride experience ==
The ride is located above a pathway connecting Galactica to the rest of Forbidden Valley. Upon the attractions debut, it featured green-illuminated fountains that interact with the ride. The gondola has a maximum height of 78ft, due to a 16ft elevated platform. It is a suspended top spin ride (guests' legs dangle rather than resting on a floor) manufactured by Huss.

== Theme ==
Alton Towers characterise the ride as the mechanism by which the fictional 'Phalanx' organisation extract saliva from the Nemesis creature using extreme centrifugal forces. The barrels alongside the queue and silos alongside the ride supposedly store Waspirium, the highly corrosive substance extracted from the creature's saliva, which is also represented by the green fountains. The tunnel underneath the platform in which the ride is elevated contains many posters with references to other former and current attractions at the theme park, including Ripsaw.

== Incidents ==
During Toxicator's public opening day, a sewer drain under the ride overflowed spilling untreated waste water into the area requiring the area near the ride entrance to be evacuated and the ride to be temporarily closed for approximately 2 hours and 45 minutes.
