= Rustai-ye Taleqani, Kerman =

Rustai-ye Taleqani روستاي طالقاني
- Village
- Location within Iran
- Coordinates: 30°53′04″N 56°35′41″E
- Country: Iran
- Province: Kerman
- County: Zarand
- Bakhsh: Central
- Rural District: Vahdat

Population (2006)
  - Total: 1,553
- Time zone: UTC+3:30 (IRST)
  - Summer (DST): UTC+4:30 (IRDT)

Rustai-ye Taleqani (Persian: روستاي طالقاني, also Romanized as Rūstāī-ye Ţāleqānī; also known as Ţāleqānī) is a village in Vahdat Rural District, in the Central District of Zarand County, Kerman Province, Iran. At the 2006 census, its population was 1,553, in 392 families.
