= Rustai-ye Taleqani, Fars =

Rustai-ye Taleqani روستاي طالقاني
- Village
- Location within Iran
- Coordinates: 30°00′19″N 51°26′53″E
- Country: Iran
- Province: Fars
- County: Mamasani
- Bakhsh: Mahvarmilani
- Rural District: Mahur

Population (2006)
  - Total: 283
- Time zone: UTC+3:30 (IRST)
  - Summer (DST): UTC+4:30 (IRDT)

Rustai-ye Taleqani (Persian: روستاي طالقاني, also Romanized as Rūstāī-ye Ţāleqānī; also known as Ţāleqānī) is a village in Mahur Rural District, Mahvarmilani District, Mamasani County, Fars province, Iran. At the 2006 census, its population was 283, in 58 families.
