= IMAscore =

German music production company

IMAscore GbR
- Type: Gesellschaft bürgerlichen Rechts
- Founded: 2009
- Headquarters: Paderborn, Germany
- Key people: Andreas Kübler, Geschäftsführer (Creative Director); Xaver Willebrand, Geschäftsführer (Managing Director)
- Number of employees: 12 (2020)
- Website: https://www.imascore.com/

IMAscore is a German company in the creative industry based in Paderborn, founded in 2009. The team consists primarily of composers and sound designers and is known for its specialization in soundtrack production for amusement parks. IMAscore has also been producing music for film and video game trailers since 2016.

== History ==
The company was founded in 2009 by Andreas Kübler, Sebastian Kübler and Xaver Willebrand. The founders got to know each other via the Internet and had previously pursued joint projects, such as the space rock band Between Horizons, which released two albums. The soundtrack for Krake roller coaster, which opened at Heide Park in 2011, was the first for an amusement park. Soundtracks for various amusement parks and attractions around the world followed. After achieving market leadership in Europe in 2014, the company has developed into the world market leader in the field of music and sound production for amusement parks by 2017.

With IMAscore, Andreas Kübler was responsible for the composition of additional music for the animated film Sam – Ein fast perfekter Held, which was published in Germany by Universum Film in 2016.

The company received increased media attention from 2016 onwards with the production of music for TV spots and for trailers for films and computer games. IMAscore achieved one of the first major placements of his music with the Omen trailer for the video game Final Fantasy XV published on October 27, 2016. The track Endlessness used in the trailer was then clicked over a million times on YouTube (as of 2019).

The trailer for Insidious: The Last Key, set to music by IMAscore, was nominated at the Golden Trailer Awards 2018 in the category Best Horror. At the award ceremony in Los Angeles on May 31, 2018, the award in the category finally went to the "Hunt" trailer for the film A Quiet Place.

On October 5, 2018, the founders of IMAscore were guests on the live television program Hier und heute of the WDR on the subject of music production for trailers. The company was also presented in the program 17:30 Sat.1.

Composer Andreas Kübler produced the music for the teaser trailer for The Lion King (2019) published on November 22, 2018. The trailer is currently (as of 2019) the most successful Disney film, with 224.6 million clicks worldwide within the first 24 hours of publication.

== Productions ==
The following soundtracks were produced and sold by the company:

=== Trailers (selection) ===
| Year | Title |
|---|---|
| 2014 | The Elder Scrolls Online |
| 2016 | The Huntsman: Winter's War |
| 2016 | Final Fantasy XV |
| 2017 | Geostorm |
| 2017 | Molly's Game |
| 2017 | Prey |
| 2017 | Call of Duty: WWII |
| 2018 | The Nutcracker and the Four Realms |
| 2018 | Rampage |
| 2018 | Insidious: The Last Key |
| 2018 | Escape Plan 2: Hades |
| 2019 | The Lion King |
| 2019 | Aladdin |
| 2023 | Batman Gotham City Escape (Parque Warner Madrid) |
| | Hellfest |

=== TV-Spots (selection) ===
| Year | Title |
|---|---|
| 2010 | How to Train Your Dragon |
| 2017 | Star Wars: The Last Jedi |
| 2017 | Only the Brave |
| 2018 | Avengers: Infinity War |
| 2018 | Solo: A Star Wars Story |
| 2018 | Incredibles 2 |
| 2018 | Maze Runner: The Death Cure |
| 2018 | Jurassic World: Fallen Kingdom |
| 2019 | Captain Marvel |
| 2019 | Breakthrough |
| 2022 | Puss in Boots: The Last Wish |

=== Amusement parks (selection) ===
| Name | Location | Notes / References |
|---|---|---|
| The Oath of Kärnan | Hansa-Park | with Budapest Symphony Orchestra |
| Highlander | Hansa-Park | |
| Nessie | Hansa-Park | |
| The little Tsar | Hansa-Park | |
| Krake | Heide Park | |
| Flug der Dämonen | Heide Park | |
| Colossos | Heide Park | |
| Bobbahn | Heide Park | |
| Ghostbusters 5D | Heide Park | |
| Wüstenflitzer | Heide Park | |
| Star Trek: Operation Enterprise | Movie Park Germany | with Budapest Symphony Orchestra |
| Excalibur - Secrets of the dark | Movie Park Germany | |
| The Lost Temple | Movie Park Germany | |
| Movie Park Studio Tour | Movie Park Germany | |
| Chiapas | Phantasialand | with Budapest Symphony Orchestra |
| Talocan | Phantasialand | |
| Mystery Castle | Phantasialand | |
| Theme area Klugheim with Taron and Raik | Phantasialand | |
| Theme area Rookburgh with F.L.Y. | Phantasialand | |
| Crazy Bats | Phantasialand | (formerly Temple of the Night Hawk) |
| Blue Fire | Europa-Park | |
| Dancing Dingie | Europa-Park | |
| The Smiler | Alton Towers | |
| Wicker Man | Alton Towers | |
| Galactica | Alton Towers | |
| Fireworks 2015 / Monorail | Alton Towers | |
| Towerstreet | Alton Towers | |
| Spinball Whizzer | Alton Towers | |
| Curse at Alton Manor | Alton Towers | |
| Nemesis Reborn | Alton Towers | |
| Dwervelwind | Toverland | |
| Troy und Scorpios | Toverland | |
| Fēnix | Toverland | |
| Port Laguna | Toverland | |
| Avalon | Toverland | |
| Magische Vallei | Toverland | |
| Helix | Liseberg | |
| Valkyria and Loke | Liseberg | |
| Kingi | Linnanmäki | |
| Taiga | Linnanmäki | |
| Derren Brown's Ghost Train | Thorpe Park | |
| Hyperia | Thorpe Park | |
| Mami Wata | Fantasiana Erlebnispark | |
| Pulsar | Walibi Belgium | |
| Karma World and Fun World | Walibi Belgium | |
| Tiki Waka | Walibi Belgium | |
| Wilde Hilde | Schwabenpark | |
| Timber (The Gravity Group) | Walibi Rhône-Alpes | |
| Mystic Timbers | Kings Island | |
| Orion | Kings Island | |
| Legoland Discovery Centre | Worldwide | |
| Sea Life | Worldwide | |
| Madame Tussauds | London | |
| Dynamite | Freizeitpark Plohn | |
| Land of Legends and Fury | Bobbejaanland | |
| Batman Gotham City Escape | Parque Warner Madrid | |
| Animal Treasure Island | Gardaland | |
| Wolf Legend | Gardaland | |

=== Television (selection) ===
| Title | Notes / References |
|---|---|
| Grimme-Preis | |
| Welt der Wunder | |
| 2011 European Artistic Gymnastics Championships | |

== Discography ==
=== Soundtrack CDs (Auswahl) ===
| Year | Title |
|---|---|
| 2012 | Shadows Of Darkness – The Van Helsing Show |
| 2013 | Magical Valley – Official Soundtrack |
| 2013 | Minas Abenteuer – Der Baum der Wunder |
| 2014 | Chiapas DIE Wasserbahn – DER Soundtrack |
| 2015 | The Soundtrack Of Mami Wata |
| 2015 | Heide Park Resort Soundtrack |
| 2015 | Magic Forest – Official Soundtrack |
| 2015 | Der Sound des KÄRNAN |
| 2016 | Liseberg Soundtrack-CD |
| 2016 | Hollywood On Parade |
| 2016 | Klugheim Soundtrack |
| 2017 | Star Trek: Operation Enterprise – Der Offizielle Soundtrack |
| 2017 | Thorpe Park Resort Soundtrack |
| 2018 | Troy – Official Soundtrack |
| 2018 | Avalon – Official Soundtrack |
| 2018 | Port Laguna – Official Soundtrack |
| 2020 | Alton Towers Resort Soundtrack |

=== EPs ===
| Year | Title |
|---|---|
| 2018 | Budapest |
| 2018 | Winterstorm |

== Awards ==
- 2012: European Talent Award in category Best Sound Design for Sebastian Kübler, given at the SoundTrack Cologne 9.0
- 2012: Kultur- und Kreativpiloten Deutschland, given by Initiative Kultur- und Kreativwirtschaft des Bundes
- 2013: FKF Award for Soundtrack of the theme area of Magische Vallei at Toverland, given by Freundeskreis Kirmes und Freizeitparks (FKF)
- 2013: 2nd place Gründerpreis NRW
