= Kärnan =

Medieval tower in Helsingborg

- Helsingborg
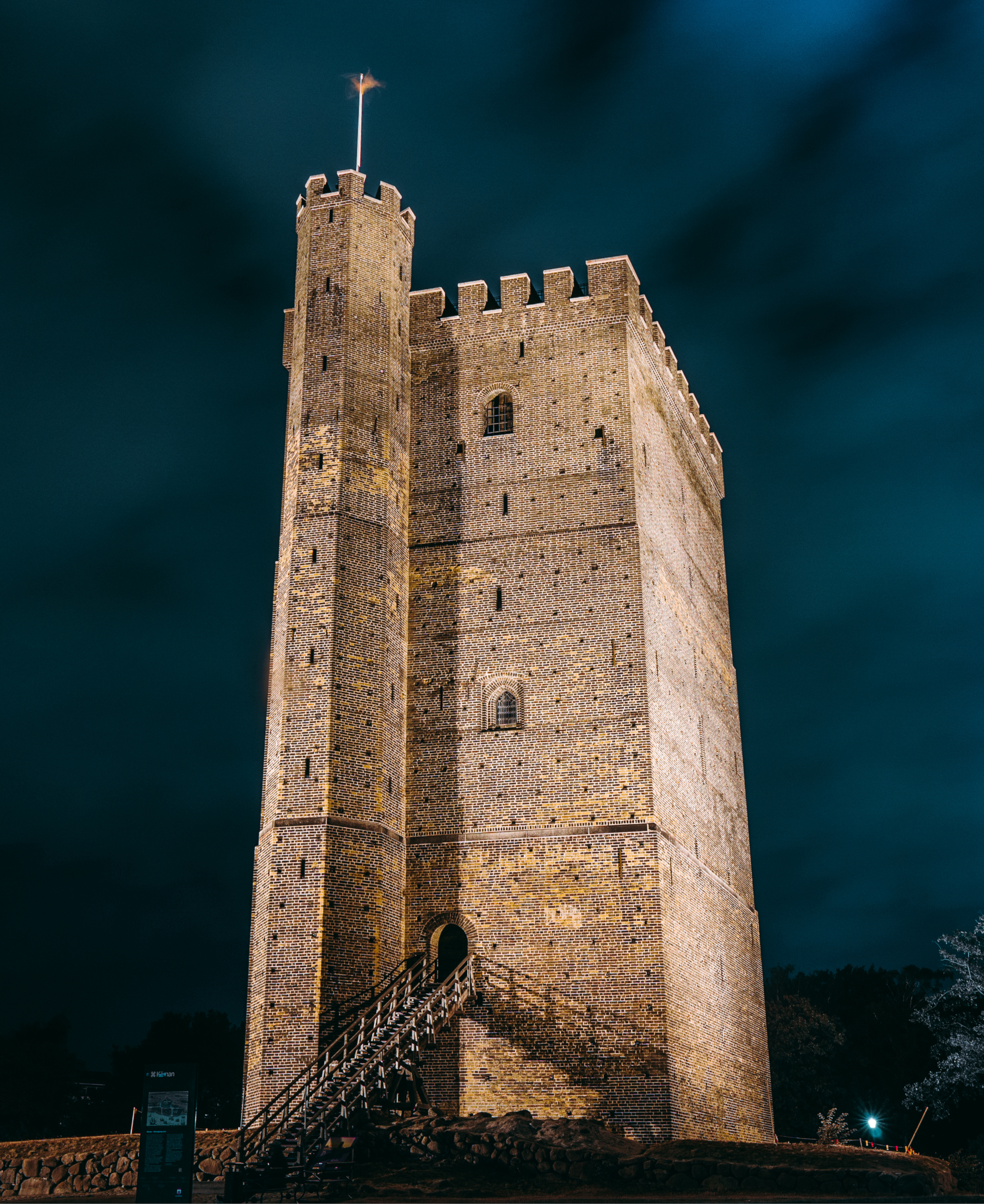
- Kärnan

Site information
- Type: Fortress
- Open to the public: Yes

Location
- Scania, Sweden
- Location within Skåne Location within Sweden
- Coordinates: 56.048321°N 12.697485°E

Site history
- Built: 14th century

Kärnan (Swedish pronunciation: [ˈɕæ̂ːɳan], literally The Core) is a medieval tower in Helsingborg, Scania, in southern Sweden. It is the only part remaining of a larger Danish fortress which, along with the fortress Kronborg on the opposite bank of the Öresund, controlled the entranceway between the Kattegat and the Öresund and further south the Baltic Sea.

== History ==
View from Stortorget looking past the Terrasstrapporna steps toward Kärnan tower in Helsingborg.

The origins of the Helsingborg fortress are disputed. Danish legend places its origin to the reign of the legendary King Fróði. However, this legend has not been supported by archaeological proof. Dendrochronological dating has shown that the core was built in the 1310s, when Eric VI of Denmark was King of Denmark. It was considered the most important fortress in Denmark, and was integral in securing control over the strait between Scania and Zealand.

It was surrendered to Sweden along with the rest of Skåneland as part of the Treaty of Roskilde in 1658. The fortress was retaken by Danish forces in 1676 during the Scanian War, and its capture celebrated by flying a giant Flag of Denmark above it. This flag was later captured by the Swedish army and is preserved in the Army Museum (Armémuseum) in Stockholm. The fortress returned to Swedish control by the Treaty of Lund in 1679. Charles XI of Sweden ordered most of it demolished fearing that it was too exposed to a sneak attack from Denmark. The only thing that was saved for posterity was the old medieval tower core. The tower continued to serve as a landmark for shipping through Øresund.

In 1741, the tower was donated by the government to the city of Helsingborg.

== Restoration ==
The castle was restored starting during 1893–94, under instructions from Oscar Ferdinand Trapp, a Swedish businessman and engineer (1847–1916). Architect for the restoration was Josef Alfred Hellerström (1863–1931), Helsingborg city architect from 1903 to 1928. The objective of the restoration was to restore, to the extent possible, the appearance the structure had based upon the oldest known medieval illustration. The building's crenellation dates from these repairs.

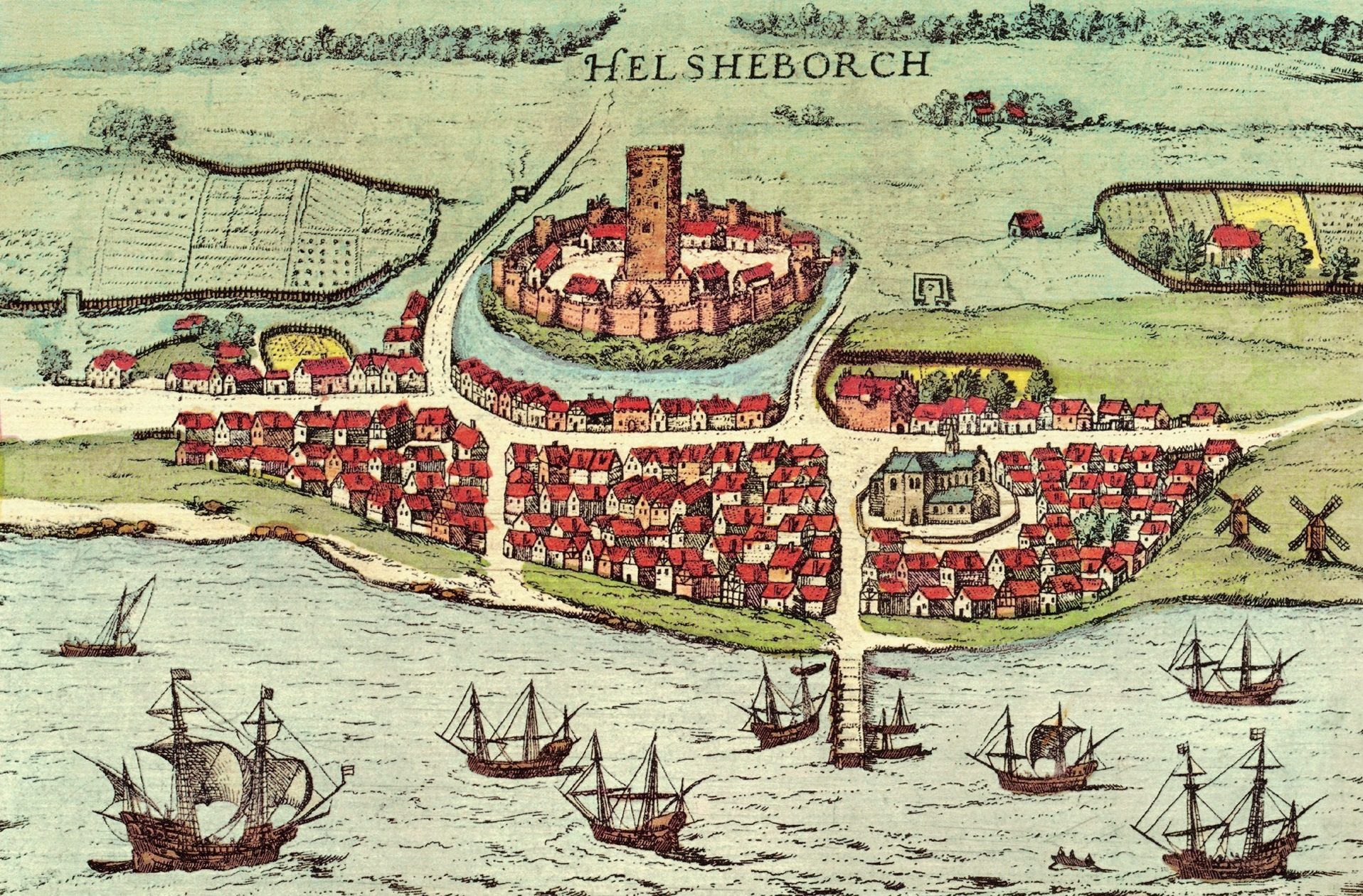
Helsingborg in the 16th century

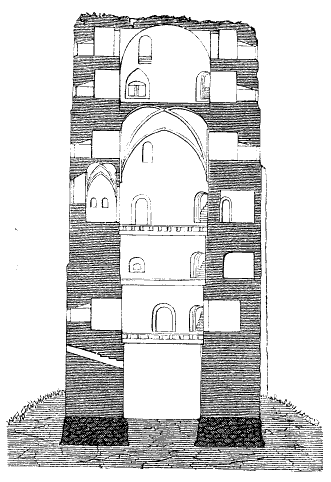
Cross section view of Kärnan tower

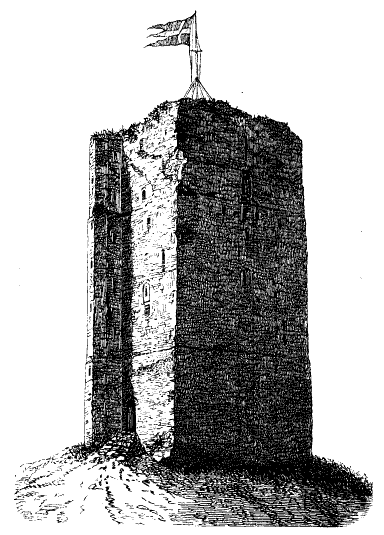
Kärnan as a ruin prior to the 1893–1894 repairs

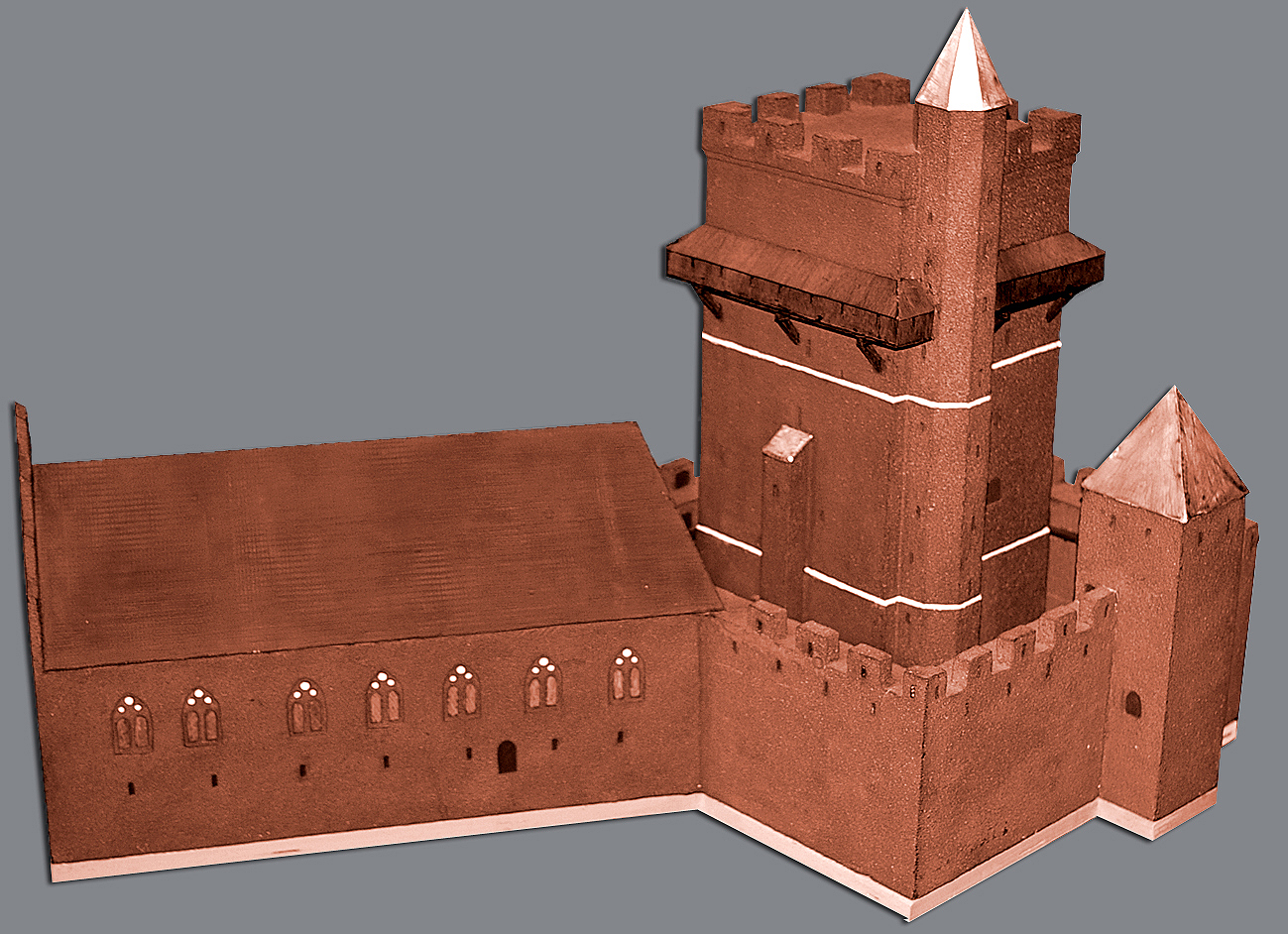
Model of the castle of Helsingborg

View of Kärnan tower from the upper level of Terrasstrapporna

== In popular culture ==
Kärnan has a roller coaster based on it, The Oath of Kärnan, at Hansa-Park in Sierksdorf, Schleswig-Holstein, Germany.

== Other sources ==
- Eriksson, Torkel (1993) Castrum nostrum Helsingburgh: Erik Menved und Schloss Helsingborg in Castella maris Baltici (Stockholm: Almqvist & Wiksell International) ISBN 91-22-01566-3
- Eriksson, Torkel (1994) En ruin försvinner : Kärnan i Helsingborg 1880-1894 (Helsingborg: Helsingborgs museiförening) ISBN 91-87274-10-8
- Johannesson, Gösta (1980) Helsingborg : Stad i 900 år (Stockholm: AWE/Geber) ISBN 91-20-06249-4
