= Dynamite (Freizeitpark Plohn) =

Steel roller coaster at Freizeitpark Plohn in Lengenfeld, Germany

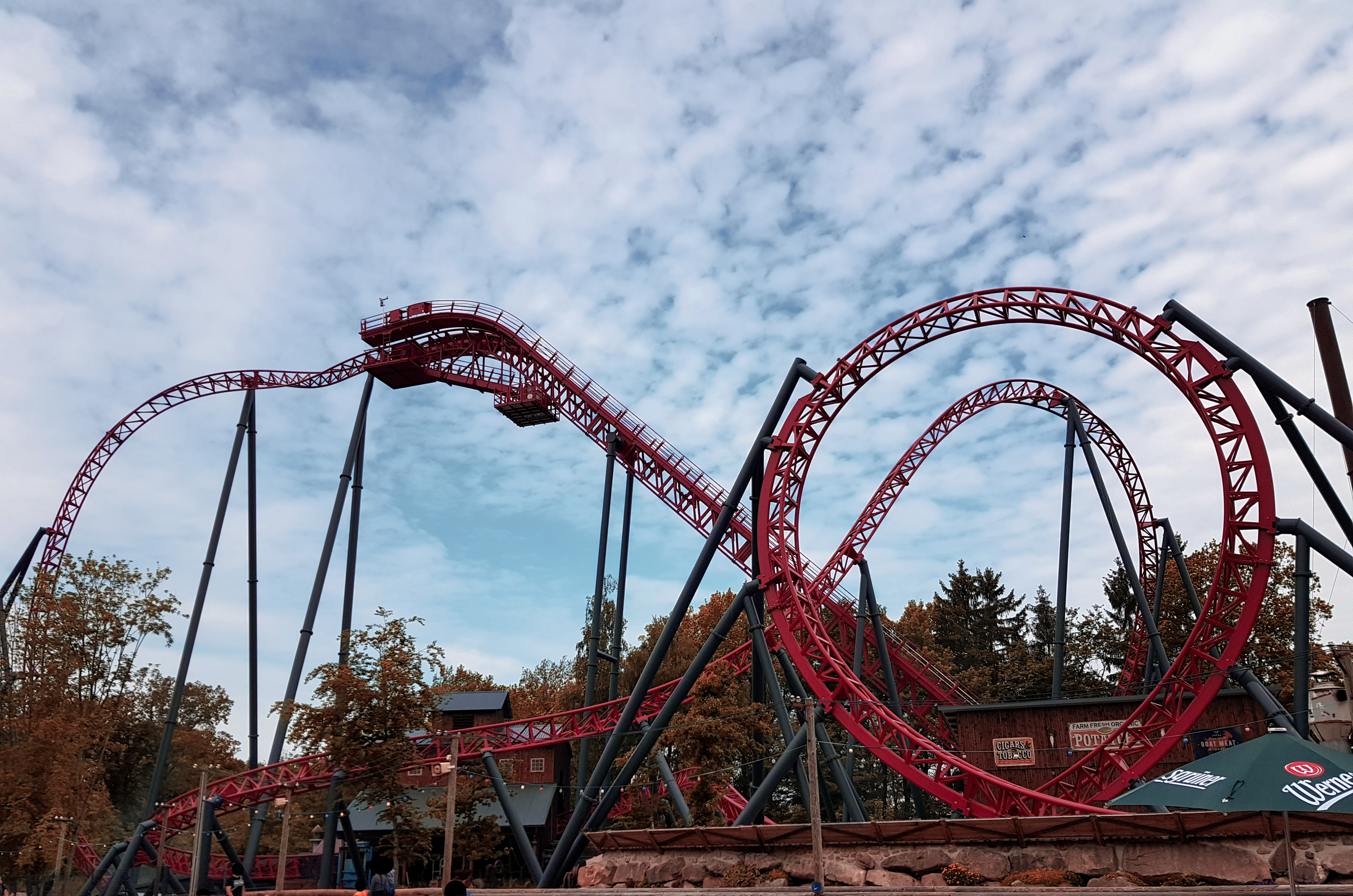
- Lift hill and looping

Freizeitpark Plohn
- Location: Freizeitpark Plohn
- Coordinates: 50.565776553565264°N 12.398832098273775°E
- Status: Operating
- Opening date: May 18, 2019

General statistics
- Type: Steel
- Manufacturer: Mack Rides
- Model: BigDipper
- Lift/launch system: Lift hill
- Height: 44 m (144 ft)
- Length: 500 m (1,600 ft)
- Speed: 100 km/h (62 mph)
- Inversions: 3
- Duration: 1:08 min
- Height restriction: 130–195 cm (4 ft 3 in – 6 ft 5 in)
- Trains: 2 cars. Riders are arranged 4 across in a single row for a total of 8 riders per train.
- Dynamite at RCDB

Video

Dynamite is a steel roller coaster at Freizeitpark Plohn, located in Lengenfeld, Saxony, Germany, manufactured by Mack Rides from the type BigDipper. The roller coaster opened on May 18, 2019 and is the second roller coaster of the manufacturer's BigDipper model after Lost Gravity in Walibi Holland. Dynamite was built on the site of the former Silver Mine. According to the park, dynamite was the park's largest single investment when it opened.

The 500 metres (1,600 ft) long route reaches a height of 44 metres (144 ft) and, in addition to a tunnel and a 270 ° helix, has three inversions: a dive drop, a loop and a zero-g roll.

== Ride experience ==
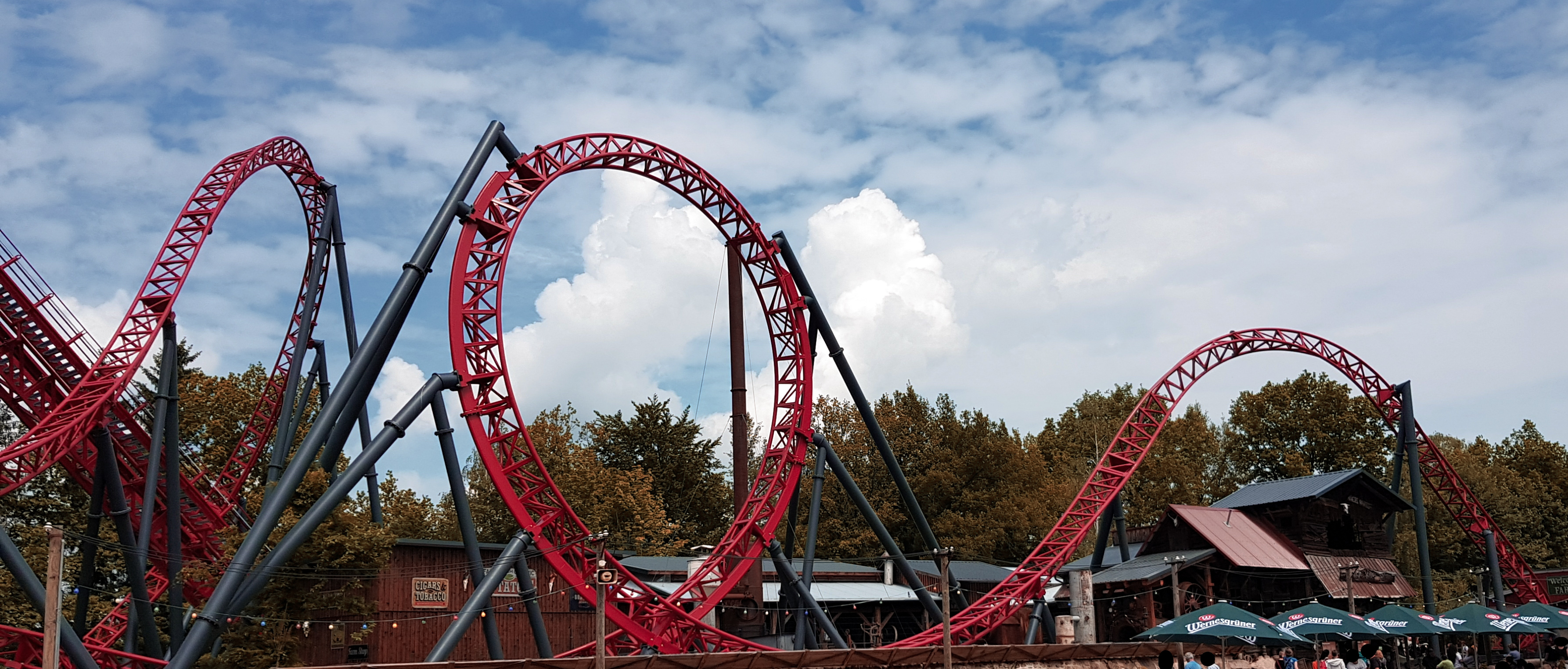
Looping with zero-g roll

After the train has left the station, it drives onto the lift hill, which ends in a dive drop at the top. There follows a right turn with 360 °, at the end of which is the looping. After the loop, the train goes into zero-g-roll before it returns to the station after a 180 ° left turn and a travel time of just over a minute.

== Trains ==
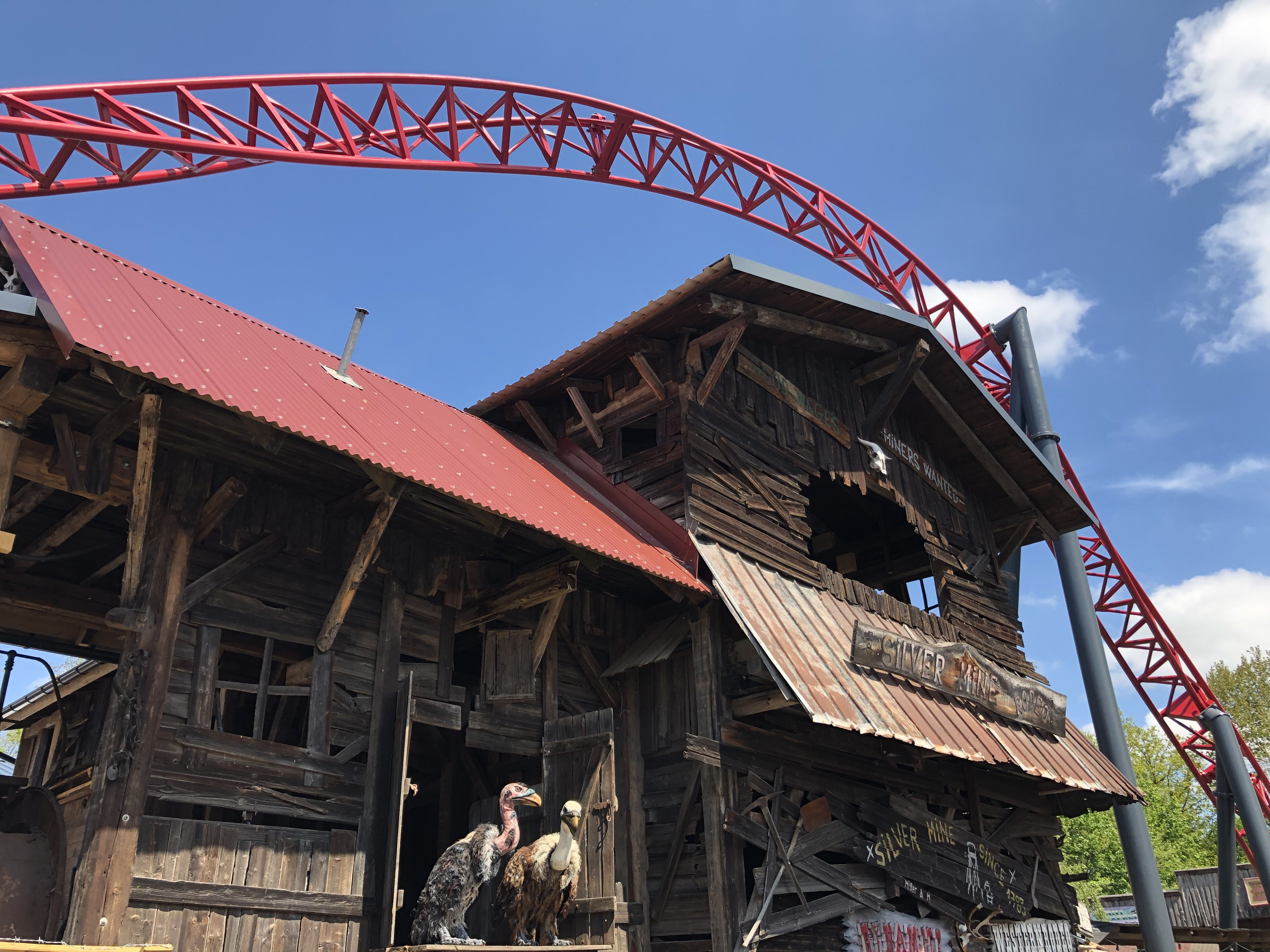
Station

Dynamite has two individual trains with space for eight people each (two rows of four people).
