= The Oath of Kärnan =

Steel roller coaster at Hansa-Park

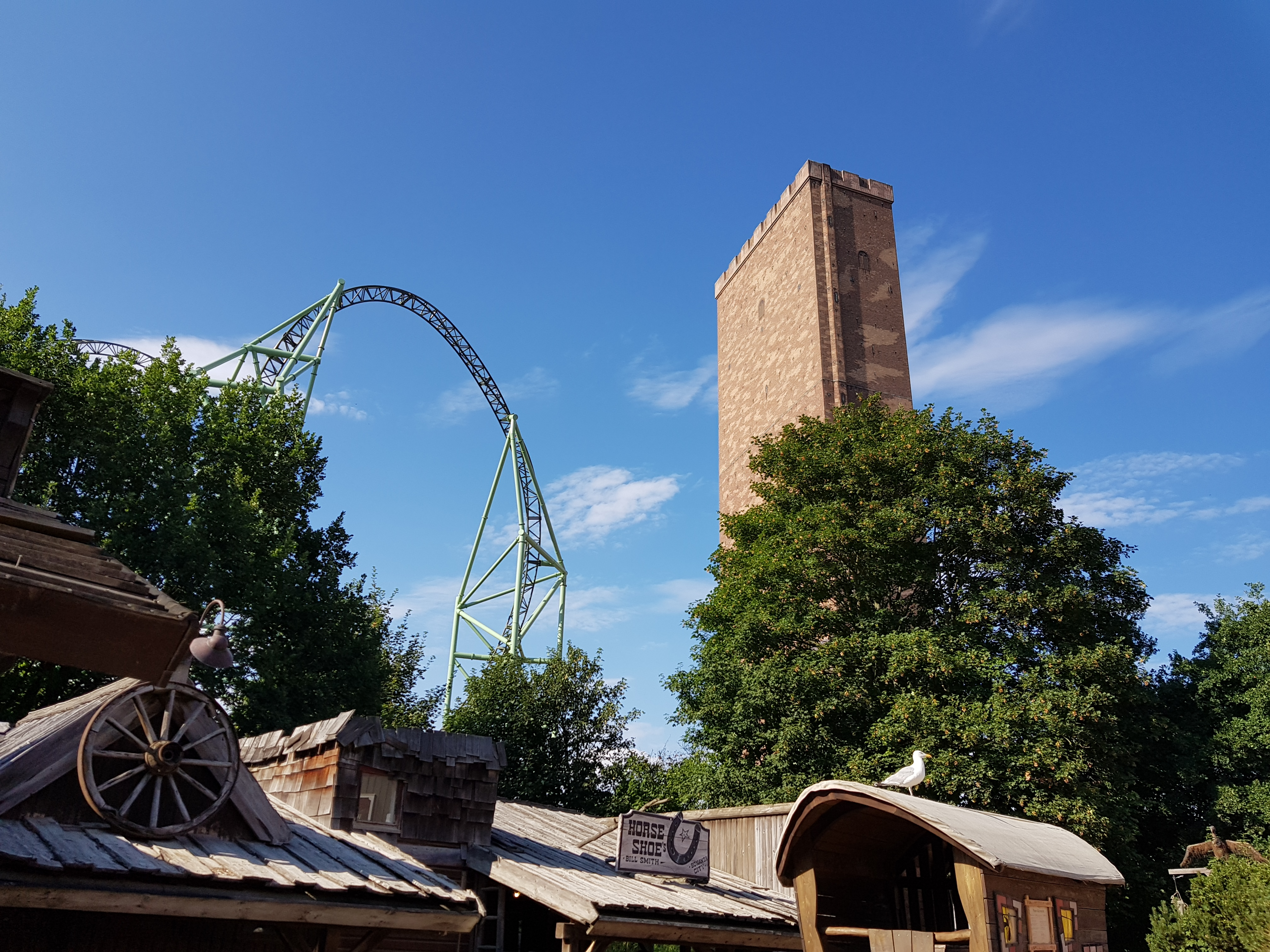
- Schematic representation of the symbol of Kärnan or its spell (above); Kärnan tower and part of the tracks (below)

Hansa-Park
- Location: Hansa-Park
- Coordinates: 54.0769°N 10.78°E
- Status: Operating
- Opening date: July 1, 2015
- Cost: ~ 26.000.000 €

General statistics
- Type: Steel
- Manufacturer: Gerstlauer
- Designer: Werner Stengel
- Model: Infinity Coaster
- Track layout: Terrain
- Lift/launch system: Chain lift hill
- Height: 73 m (240 ft)
- Drop: 67 m (220 ft)
- Length: 1,235 m (4,052 ft)
- Speed: 127 km/h (79 mph)
- Inversions: 1
- Duration: 3:37 minutes
- Max vertical angle: 90°
- Capacity: ~ 200 riders per hour
- G-force: 5
- Height restriction: 130 cm (4 ft 3 in)
- Trains: 3 trains with 4 cars; riders arranged 4 across in a single row for a total of 16 riders per train
- The Oath of Kärnan at RCDB

The Oath of Kärnan (German: Der Schwur des Kärnan, short: Kärnan; stylized: The Oath of KÄRNAN) is a steel roller coaster at Hansa-Park, located in Sierksdorf, Schleswig-Holstein, Germany. Manufactured by Gerstlauer, the roller coaster is one of five full-circuit hypercoasters with inversions in Europe. The 1,235-metre (4,052 ft) long roller coaster, which has a track height of 73 metres (240 ft), a drop height of 67 metres (220 ft) and a speed of up to 127 kilometres per hour (79 mph) is with Silver Star the fourth highest roller coaster in Europe after Shambhala (76 metres (249 ft)), Hyperion (77 metres (253 ft)) and Red Force (112 metres (367 ft)).

== History ==
Kärnan was first announced by Hansa-Park in November 2013, following an extensive planning and development stage. Gerstlauer were chosen to manufacture the coaster, Kärnan being their first installation over 61-metre (200 ft) in height. It was also the third consecutive Gerstlauer coaster to feature in the park, following Escape of Novgorod and Midgard Serpent.

Construction began on the tower element that will house the vertical lift hill in April 2014, with the tower itself being topped off in September 2014. Hansa Park confirmed that the coaster will feature a dark ride section with an inversion. Kärnan also has a 30 metres (98 ft) vertical reverse free fall drop during the vertical lift, a world first on a full-circuit roller coaster.

Kärnan officially opened to the public on 1 July 2015, with further addition of theming completed in 2016.

== Layout ==
=== Ride experience ===
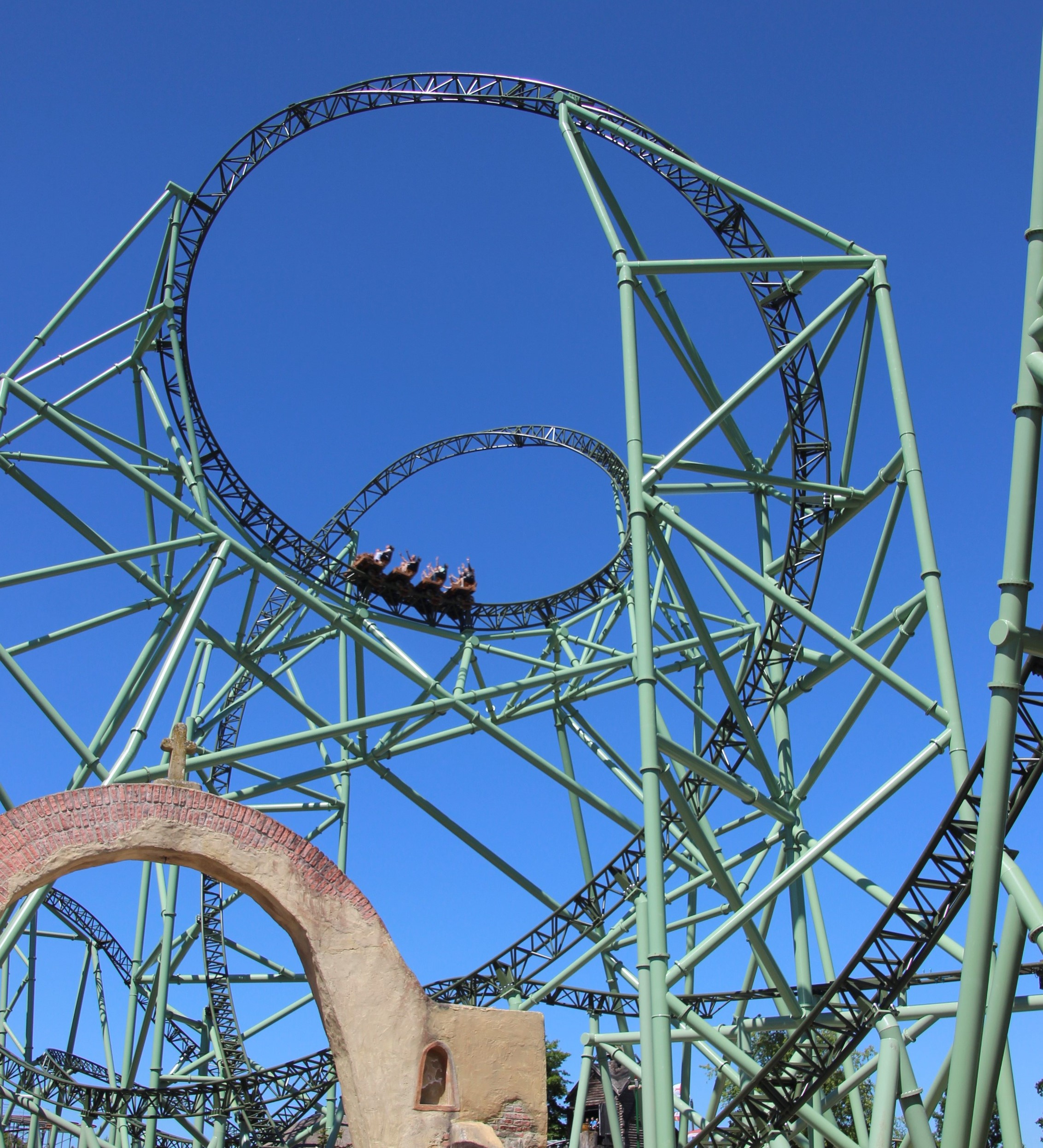
Train in the non-inverting sea serpent roll

The route is divided into two areas, a dark ride section, in which the ride starts and ends, and the main part is an outdoor route. The Kärnan has some special elements, such as the world's first vertical lift hill with a backward free fall from a height of over 60 metres (200 ft), the speed of which was increased from 18 kilometres per hour (11 mph) to 40 kilometres per hour (25 mph) in 2017. The lift hill is completely enclosed in a 79 metres (259 ft) high tower. The roller coaster also has a non-inverting sea serpent roll, a vertical descent with a twist, airtime hill and a heartline roll at the end of the ride. After the first drop and the heart element, the layout of the roller coaster is kept closer to the ground in large parts of the route. Kärnan operates with 3 trains of 16 seats each, laid out in 4 rows of 4 with lap bar restraints. These are the same type of trains and restraints as found on Gerstlauer's other Infinity Coasters, such as Karacho at Tripsdrill.

==== Lift hill ====
When the lift opened in 2015, the tower ceiling was illuminated in blue. This effect was abandoned after a short time. A soundtrack is played from the entrance of the train to the first drop, the dynamics of which is synchronized with the journey. For the 2019 season, a further theming element was added in the tower: During the vertical ascent on the lift hill, the passenger, now lying on their back, looks at a screen attached to the tower ceiling, on which the spirit of King Eric Menved appears to him in the form of the video sequences in the queue. He reports that he has been tied to the tower for all eternity, whereupon the backward free fall begins. After this, the voice of the builder who wants to help the guests out of the tower can be heard and the train continues its journey on the lift hill to the first drop. If the familiar musical background was initially dispensed with in the first few days of this innovation, the park plays it back when driving on the lift hill and after the backward free fall in order to meet the visitors' wishes and therefore shortened the builder's monologue.

=== Waiting area ===
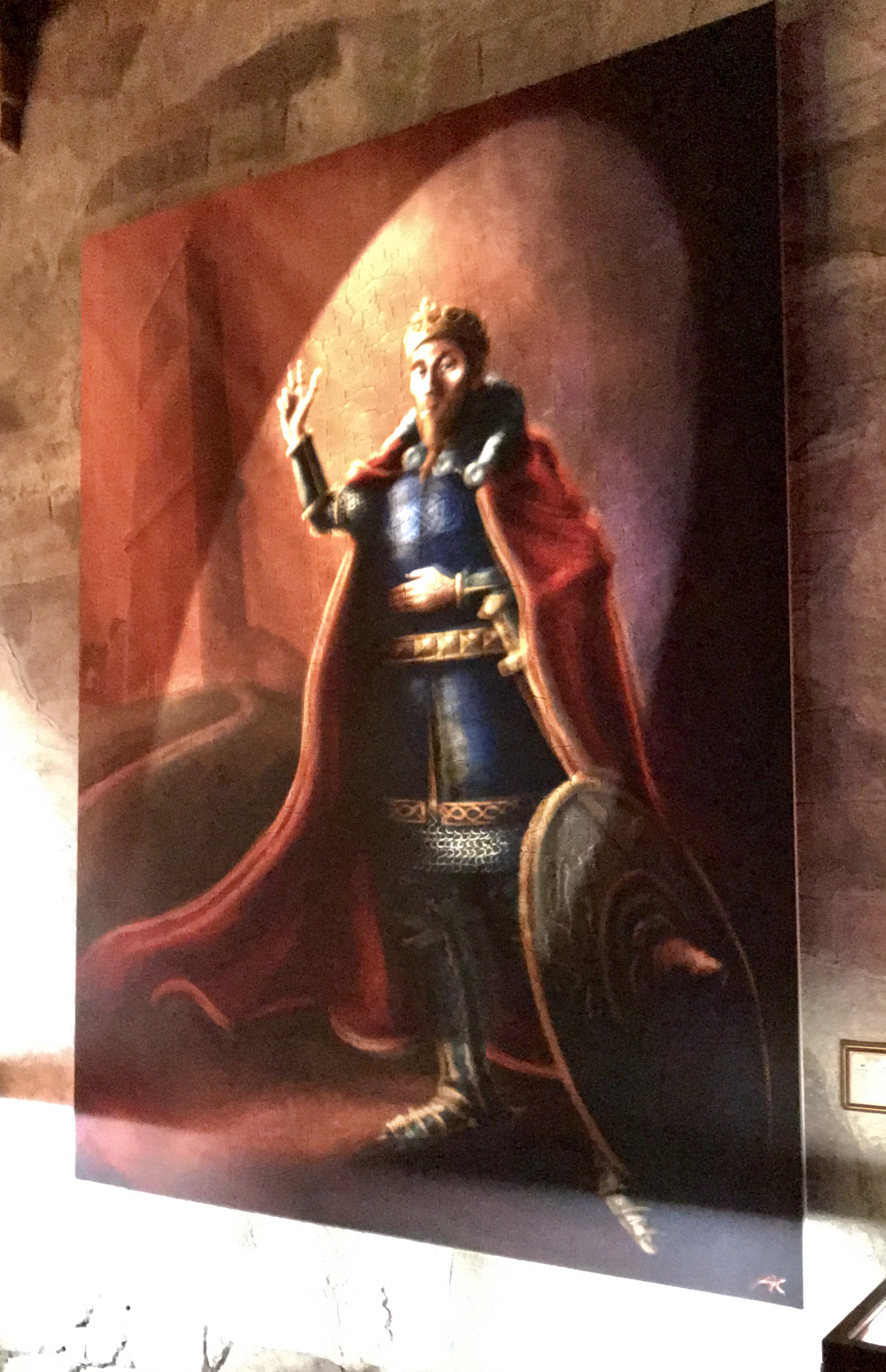
Painting of Eric Menved in the waiting area

The waiting area is the KÄRNAN Museum. In the first part, the visitor sees a 15-minute documentary in seven parts in which Christian Schröder (moderator) visits Kärnan in Helsingborg and gets to the bottom of the legend. In the further course, the waiting person walks through numerous rooms such as a throne room in which the first indications of the spell can be seen like the symbol of Kärnan on the throne. On further screens the visitors are informed by an actor that another part of the fortress has just been exposed and that a longer stay in Kärnan is unsafe due to the danger of collapse. Visitors should leave the fortress via the "royal escape vehicle", which is the roller coaster train. It is pointed out again and again that no loose objects should be carried, which actually corresponds to the safety instructions for using the roller coaster. All parts of the waiting area are underlaid with sound effects such as chain rattling, sword fighting or the original soundtrack of the roller coaster. The lighting is kept very dark.

==== Studio of the builder ====
In this room, visitors are admitted in groups of a maximum of 16 people. A video is played in which the protagonist, who is already known from the queue, explores this room and discovers a "secret compartment" in a wall of books that turns out to be a luggage rack for the passengers. In the video, visitors are again asked to put down all loose objects, which the roller coaster operator expressly points out for the last time before the ride. For example, it is forbidden to wear headgear, scarves or glasses while riding.

==== Room of the spell ====
Afterwards, the passengers are led into a darkened room and are divided into four rows independently in groups of four. A random generator determines which of the groups of four will be seated in which row of seats in the roller coaster train. This happens when one of the four rows lights up and then one of four doors opens, which determines the row in the roller coaster train. A free choice of the row of seats is therefore not possible. The passenger can only decide with whom he would like to take a seat in a row of four. Here, too, the drama in the music contributes a large part to the overall experience, with the green light symbols in the panels on the floor and above the doors each representing the symbol of the Kärnan.

== Thematic context ==
=== Background story ===
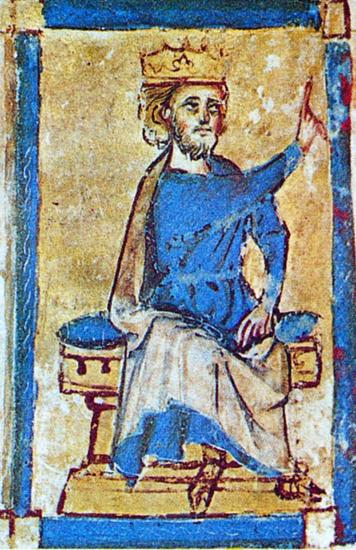
Miniature of Eric V (1282)

The old King of Denmark, Eric V of Denmark, was stabbed to death by his closest confidante while hunting on a November night. His son Eric VI of Denmark, who was 12 years old at the time, succeeded him on the throne. He took every oath of his reign, including his coronation oath, "by all holy men" (Danish: ved alle hellige mænd), which gave him the nickname Eric Menved. During the beginning of his reign, his father's vogelfrei murderers still roamed the coasts of Denmark, which frightened the people, but Eric did not care. His focus was on conquering distant countries and participating in all tournaments. In this way he spent the court's money until it ran out, which is why he increased taxes and pledged parts of his kingdom to nobles from other countries.

A famine broke out in Denmark later, but this did not prompt Eric to lower the tax rate. Instead, he put down the uprisings by force and had the corpses hung up outside the town as a deterrent, which meant that the nobility now turned against the king and a great rebellion broke out, which Eric could only put down with the help of foreign mercenary troops. Even that did not cause him to admit his mistakes, but rather let him see himself threatened by his people and neighboring kingdoms. He called the royal court together and announced:

Our enemies lurk in the shadows and beyond the borders of our Kingdom, but we will build a fortress for us and for Denmark - and it will be stronger than a fortress ever was, so that our enemies will never take it and never tear it down become! We swear it, by all holy men.

As a result, the master builder of the courtyard was given an impossible task: to build an impregnable fortress. With this task he temporarily withdrew to his studio and created a blueprint for a fortress with a mighty outer enceinte, a moat, a drawbridge, numerous defense systems and the most powerful keep in the world, the Kärnan. The interior consisted of a splendid reception hall, a few private suites, warehouses and a deep well to provide access to drinking water in the event of a siege. The builder also constructed a system of secret passages in the walls of the fortress and a sophisticated escape plan for the royal family. Immediately after Eric sifted through the construction plans, he gave the order to build the Kärnan, which made his dream of being invincible come within reach. The builder had seen many kings, some more benevolent, some more cruel, but a king like Eric, who put his own welfare that much above that of his people, was unknown to him until then. During the construction, the builder thought about how he could help the people without breaking his oath to build the indomitable fortress. One evening he watched the king and his advisors playing dice and had a flash of genius. He hurried into his archives and looked in the ancient writings of his predecessors for a magic formula with which he could protect the tower, punish the king for his cruelty and keep him away from the people.

After seven years the last stone was set, the builder stepped before the king and said that the construction was complete and that a fortress that was probably invincible had been built for the king. Eric froze at this and inquired whether he had not publicly sworn and ordered the builder under threat of death penalty to build a tower that would be absolutely invincible for all eternity. The builder affirmed, said the Kärnan was safer than any other fortress and confessed that he dared not mention anything like the protective spell in the presence of the king. Eric pricked up his ears and instructed the builder to tell him about this spell and whether it would make the Kärnan invincible. The builder affirmed again, but warned Eric that the effect would be high, but the price would be even higher. He pulled a scroll from his pouch and told Eric that when it was read, a powerful spell would fall over the tower, to which all those who dared to attack the Kärnan, threatened or approached it with the wrong intention - the spell would bring them to ruin. This formula, he continued, would actually make the Kärnan invincible, but the costs of the protective spell were very high.

Eric greedily snatched the scroll from the builder. He would pay and therefore raise taxes, he said, not realizing that his following words, with their blind focus on power, would come at a much higher price. He would dare, by all holy men. Eric unrolled the parchment and spoke the protective formula over the tower. With every word he had the feeling that another part of himself was loosening and igniting the spell in the depths of the Kärnan. By the time he finished reading he had aged decades, with wrinkled skin and blank eyes. He died shortly afterwards, but the oath remained, leaving the kingdom an impregnable fortress. No army could conquer the Kärnan and no enemy could take it. With this the builder has achieved what he had intentioned. The spirit of the king was banished forever in the Kärnan and could only be freed by an act of kindness, which Eric Menved had never performed during his lifetime.

=== Theming ===
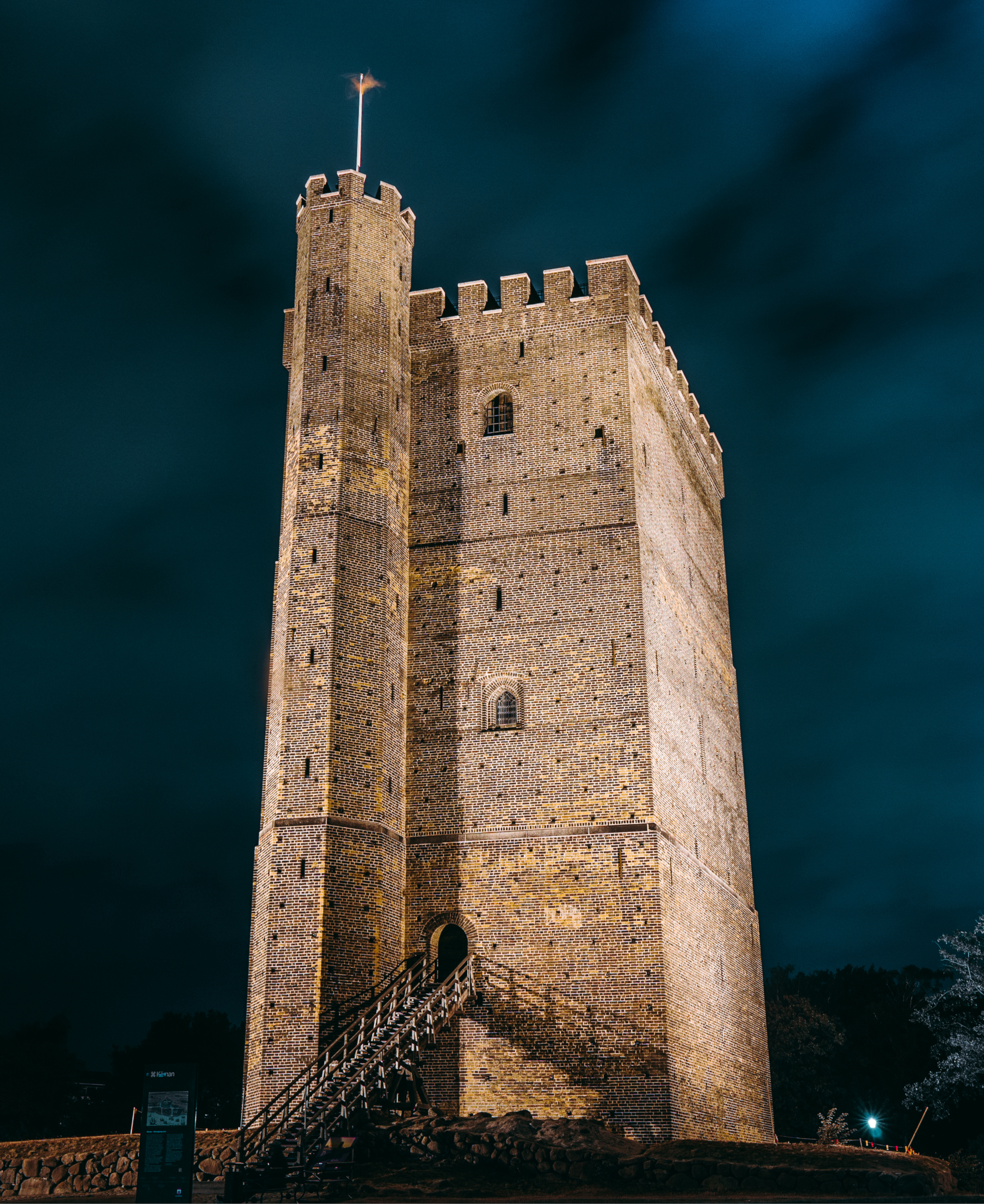
Original Kärnan in Helsingborg

The theme of the roller coaster is based on the story of King Eric Menved, who had the medieval Kärnan tower built as an inaccessible fortress and, according to legend, covered it with a protective spell. The tower still stands in Helsingborg, Sweden, and was replicated by Hansa-Park in more than double the size. The theming work was completed in 2017. The waiting area was also not yet finally themed at the opening.

In the summer of 2017, the Hansa-Park adapted its theme areas again. The forecourt of the Kärnan is now part of The Realms of the North and no longer of Fiesta del Mar (the Mexican area). A statue of King Eric Menved, the builder of the real Kärnan in Helsingborg, was erected here in the same year and unveiled on the occasion of the 40th anniversary of Hansa-Park. The Kungstorget Medley, which is part of the Kärnan's soundtrack, is played on the place.

==== Kärnapulten ====
The story about Kärnan is complemented by the novelty 2017 Kärnapulten, a Gerstlauer Sky Fly (type of amusement ride), which is located in the immediate vicinity of the Kärnan. This attraction was already recognizable in the 2016 season by the layout of the Kärnan, because a parchment in the builder's studio shows this attraction.

==== Visit of the Shadow Creatures ====
Every year between September and October, the Visit of the Shadow Creatures takes place on a few weekends. The Kärnan's dungeon has existed since 2018, which thematically refers to the story already told by Kärnan and also makes a thematic link with the Escape from Novgorod and the previous times of the Visit of the Shadow Creatures with a wall-mapping-show. The dungeon is a room in which disguised actors show the horrors of the dungeon, the visitor himself is viewed as a prisoner. The Kärnan's dungeon is one of currently three horror attractions in the park and is only used for this event. The age limit for all three attractions is 12 years.

== Soundtrack ==
Der Sound des KÄRNAN

Soundtrack album by IMAscore
- Released: January 1, 2020
- Recorded: Budapest, Hungary
- Genres: Ambient, Choir
- Length: 35:12
- Language: German

The symphonic soundtrack Der Sound des KÄRNAN for the roller coaster was produced by IMAscore and recorded in Hungary with the Budapest Symphony Orchestra and Choir. 63 musicians and 40 choir singers were deployed here. The texts of the individual songs are sung in German and refer to the background story of Kärnan around King Eric of Denmark. The Kärnan's soundtrack is the first IMAscore soundtrack to be sung with a live choir. The recordings in Budapest took two days, the entire production, from conception to completion, took around a year.

Parts of the soundtrack can be heard in the documentation shown in the waiting area, as well as in the greater part of the waiting area and in indoor parts during the journey. The CD with a playing time of 35:12 minutes can be purchased in Hansa-Park and in the IMAscore online shop. On January 1, 2020, IMAscore published a video of the recordings in Budapest on YouTube.

No.	Title	Length
1.	"KÄRNAN"	3:18
2.	"Royal Reception"	4:45
3.	"Ancient Paths"	2:35
4.	"Open The Gates"	2:48
5.	"The Spell"	3:14
6.	"Invincible"	3:20
7.	"Kungstorget Medley" (Bonus track)	15:12
Total length:		35:12

== Reactions ==
=== Awards ===
The Kärnan was awarded with the FKF Award 2015.

=== Critics ===
Kärnan has received mostly positive reviews, with coaster enthusiasts praising its layout and elements, along with the theming.

Thanks to the attraction, Hansa-Park was able to increase its visitor numbers by over 100,000 visitors to around 1.4 million visitors, and has kept this number ever since.

Many praised the attraction for the backward free fall and described it as a suitable addition to the park.

Some visitors criticize the long waiting time, which can be attributed to the low capacity due to the backward free fall. The driving experience is also sometimes criticized, according to visitor reports, the driving characteristics of the roller coaster have changed negatively over the years.
