= Highlander (Hansa-Park) =

Gyro drop tower at Hansa-Park

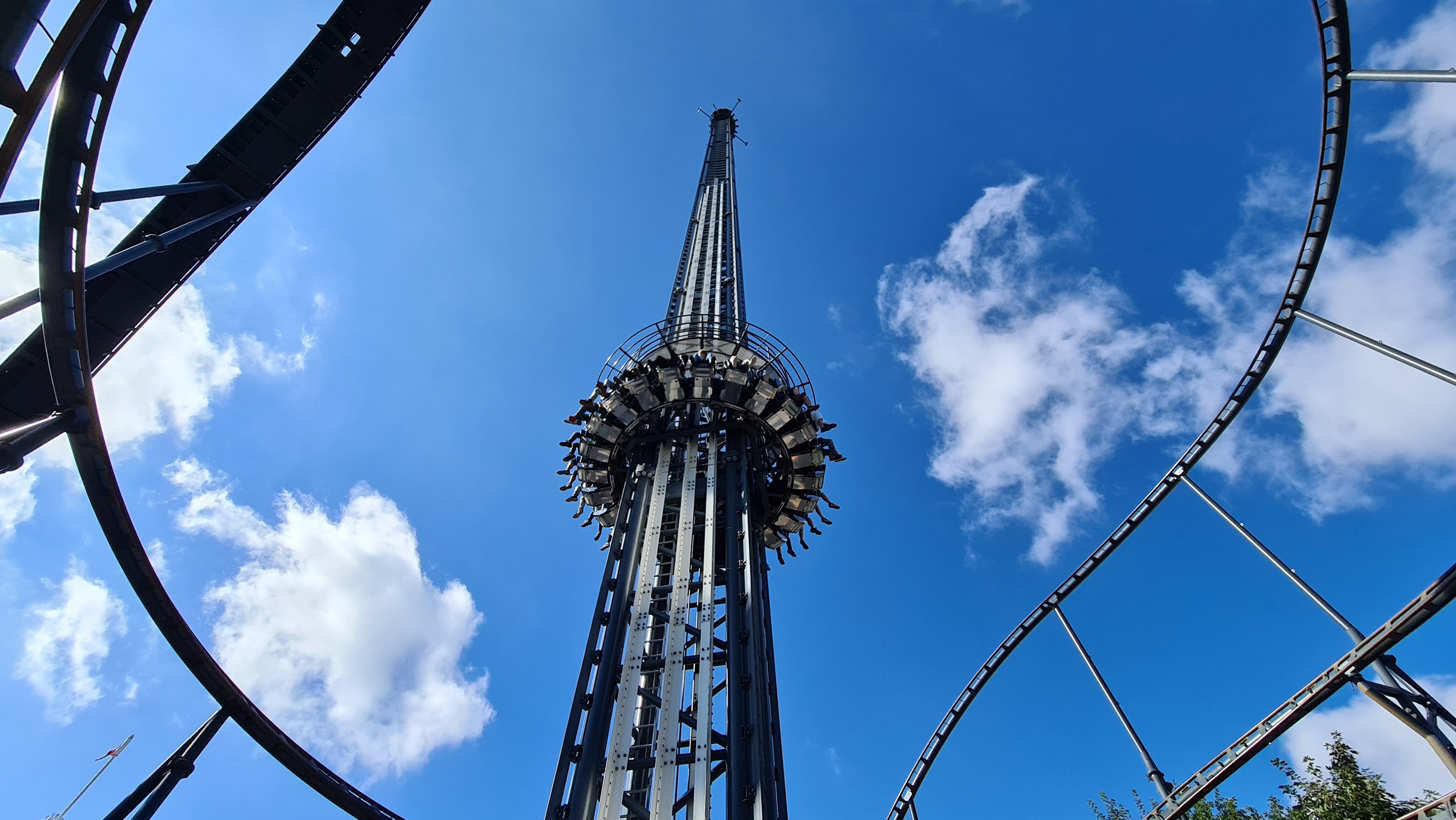
- Highlander seen from the ground

Hansa-Park
- Coordinates: 54.07583196077328°N 10.778906238366325°E
- Status: Operating
- Opening date: 2019

Ride statistics
- Attraction type: Gyro drop tower
- Manufacturer: Funtime (manufacturer)
- Model: Skyfall
- Theme: Eilean Donan Castle
- Music: Highlander Soundtrack
- Height: 120 m (390 ft)
- Drop: 103 m (338 ft)
- Speed: 120 km/h (75 mph)
- Vehicle type: Gondola
- Riders per vehicle: 24

The Highlander is a gyro drop tower at Hansa-Park, located in Sierksdorf, Schleswig-Holstein, Germany, with a total height of 120 metres (390 ft) to the top and a fall height of 103 metres (338 ft). This made it the world's tallest gyro drop tower and the world's tallest and fastest gyro drop tower with tilting seats at the time of opening. After the 2021 opening of the taller Orlando FreeFall drop tower with a height of 131 m (430 ft), Highlander is now the tallest gyro drop tower in the world after Orlando FreeFall was demolished in 2023.

== Ride ==
The Highlander has two driving programs: Tilt and Super-Tilt. The gondola rotates counter-clockwise as it travels upwards. Shortly before reaching the highest position, the seats tilt forward by 30°. Tilted like this, the gondola turns around the tower one more time. If the Tilt drive program is carried out, the seats tilt back to their normal position before the gondola falls. In the Super-Tilt drive program, on the other hand, the gondola falls with the seats tilted forward. These are only tilted back on the ground before the safety bar is unlocked.

== Technical details ==
The tower stands on bored piles that reach 28 metres (92 ft) deep into the ground. The gondola is braked by magnetic brakes, and offers space for 24 people who are secured with shoulder straps during the journey.

After a fatal incident at a similar drop tower by the same manufacturer at ICON Park in Orlando in March 2022, where a rider fell from his seat during the ride, Hansa-Park stated that they "can rule out an incident like the one in Florida" since Highlander cannot be started "unless all safety bars have been closed in a defined minimum position". The park added additional seat belts to the ride in advance of the start of the season in April 2022.

== Thematic context ==
The Highlander was opened on April 26, 2019 shortly after the start of the season on April 4, 2019 and at the same time formed the starting signal for the new themed area Beautiful Britain, which is being built around the newly designed classic looping roller coaster Nessie. Its purpose is to introduce its visitors to the world of Scotland and the Eilean Donan Castle.

=== Soundtrack ===
The Highlander Soundtrack was produced in a Scottish style by Andreas and Sebastian Kübler from IMAscore.
