= Freizeitpark Plohn =

Seasonal amusement park in Germany

- Previously known as Märchen- und Erlebnispark Forellenhof Plohn
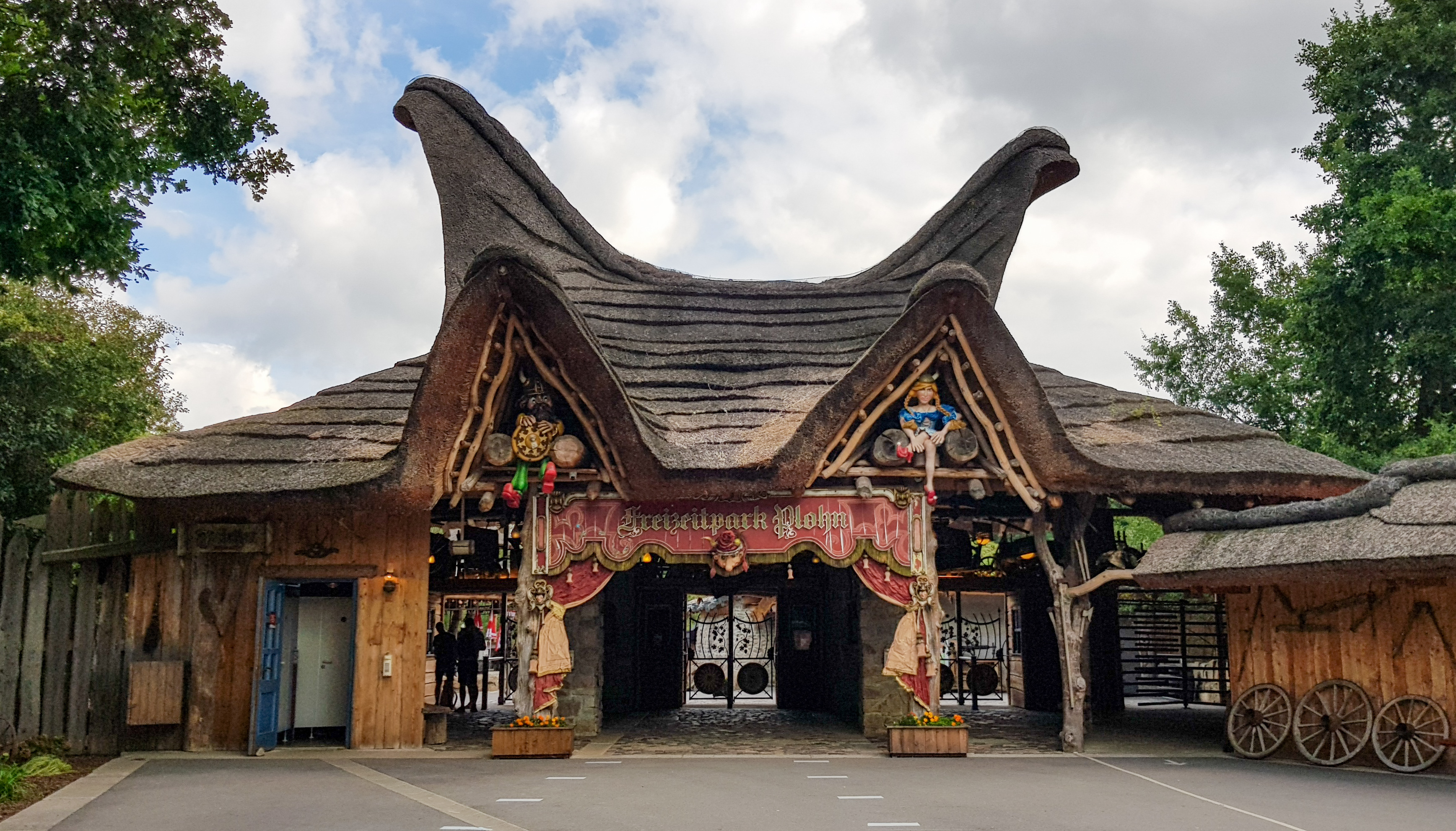
- Entrance area since 2016
- Interactive map of Freizeitpark Plohn
- Location: Lengenfeld, Saxony, Germany
- Coordinates: 50.566605179493784°N 12.397077298277603°E
- Status: Operating
- Opened: 1996
- Operated by: Freizeitpark Plohn GmbH
- Attendance: 350,000
- Area: 25 hectares (62 acres)

Attractions
- Total: 79 (2021)
- Roller coasters: 6
- Water rides: 4
- Website: https://www.freizeitpark-plohn.de/en/

The Freizeitpark Plohn (also known as Plohni; formerly Märchen- und Erlebnispark Forellenhof Plohn) is a seasonal amusement park in Lengenfeld, Saxony, Germany. It has about 350,000 visitors a year and 79 attractions.

== History ==
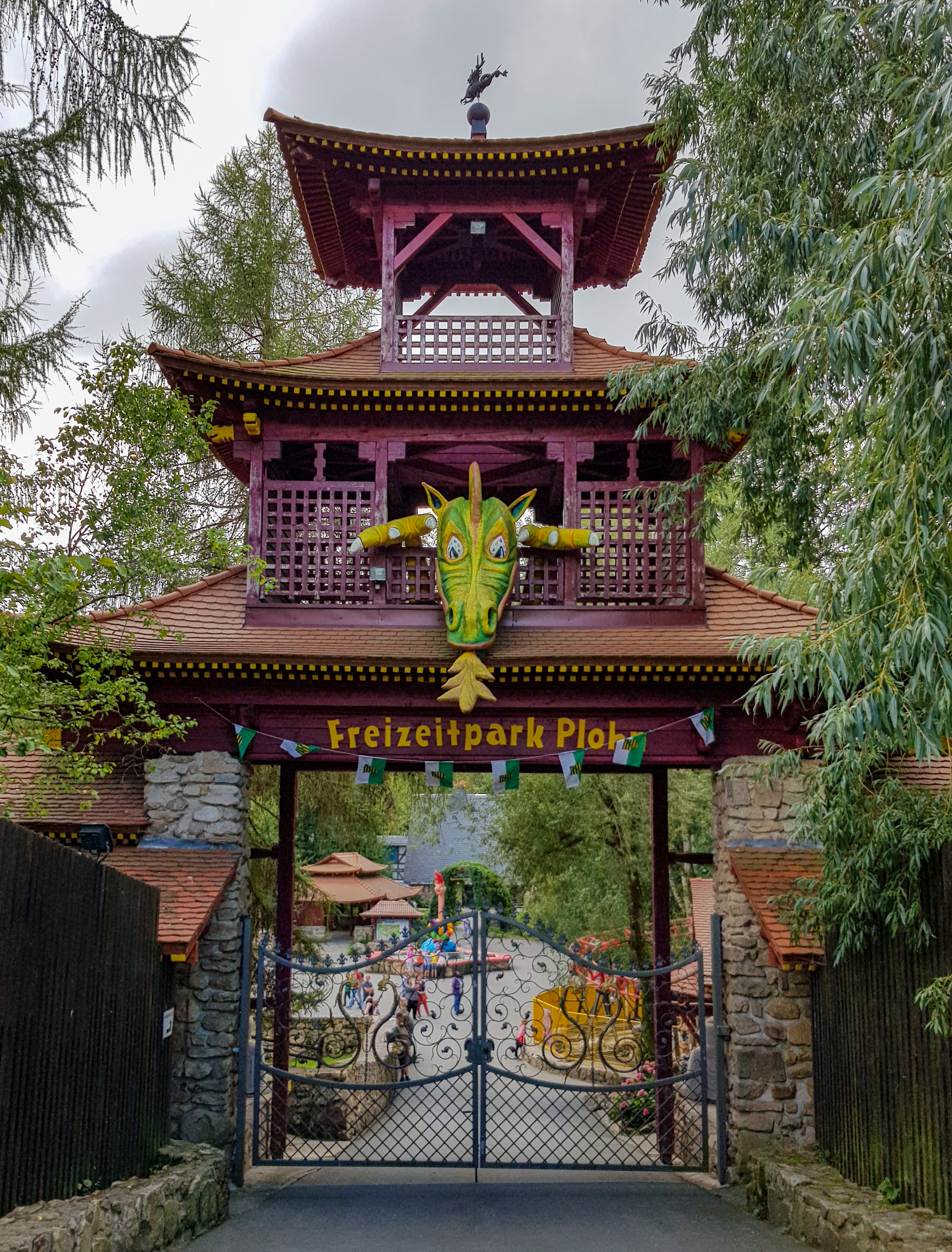
Old entrance area

Arnfried Völkel, who became unemployed after the Peaceful Revolution, built a trout farm in Plohn (Lengenfeld municipality) in 1991. On the basis of this restaurant, he opened a small fairy tale forest with twelve fairy tales by the Brothers Grimm in 1996. In the course of the following years the park continued to develop. The park's largest investments so far in 2009 were for the El Toro wooden roller coaster, the large water ride Wild Water Ride that has been in the park since 1999 and the Mack Rides BigDipper coaster called Dynamite in 2019. The park had its first roller coaster as early as 2000, the Silver Mine from the manufacturer Zierer. However, this was not a brand new ride at the time of purchase; it was a model from 1975 that had previously been in various other parks.

In 2005 the park celebrated its tenth season and opened two attractions, Germany's largest tree house and a looping ride. In 2006, the roller coaster Raupe (English: Caterpillar), a roller coaster for children, was added. A completely new themed area was opened in The Flintstones-like style with a drop tower at the beginning of 2007, the Dinoland (derived from the Dinosaurs). This was expanded for the 2008 season to include Flintstone's Gunboats. These are themed pedalos. Also new in 2008 were the ghost train Scary Scooter (closed), which is now supposed to scare visitors in the beginning of the water ride, and the Ghost Mill. In 2009 the wooden roller coaster El Toro was opened.

A new themed area, the Plohni Village, was opened at the start of the season on April 21, 2011. As a new attraction there is the family roller coaster Plohseidon from Zierer, a nostalgia-carousel, which was previously in Heide Park and Plohni's Diving Excursion since Whitsun 2012. Since 2013 there has been a completely new theme area: The village of the Gauls (German: Dorf der Gallier). The main attraction is the raft water slide called Curse of Teutates (German: Fluch des Teutates), manufactured by ABC Rides. The tavern house has been back on the complex since 2014, and work is being carried out on sanitary and catering facilities in the style of a Gaul village. In 2015, the new indoor roller coaster Miniwah & The Secret of Gold Creek City, manufactured by Mack Rides with a multimedia show opened in the former arena. In 2016 the park opened a new main entrance in the style of the Village of the Gauls. The construction of a bungalow resort with up to 600 beds is planned for the future. Furthermore, the vaulted cellar in the Old Brewery is to be expanded.

== Attractions ==
The attractions of the Freizeitpark Plohn are divided into the following theme areas: Plohni's Village, Village of the Gauls, Wild West City, Enchanted Forest, Dinoland, Nature Park, Oldtimerpark, an area for the action attractions and a catering area.

=== Roller coasters ===
Picture	Name	Type	Manufacturer	Theme area	Opening date
	Caterpillar	Family Coaster (MX48)	SBF Visa Group	Oldtimerpark	2006
	El Toro	Wooden roller coaster	Great Coasters International	Action area	10 April 2009
	Plohseidon	Force – 190	Zierer Rides	Plohni's Village	2011
	Miniwah & The Secret of Gold Creek City (short: Miniwah)	Powered roller coaster	Mack Rides	Action area	2015
	Dragon Swivel	Spinning roller coaster	SBF Visa Group	Action area	2017
	Dynamite	BigDipper	Mack Rides	Action area	2019

=== Water rides ===
Pictures	Name	Type	Manufacturer	Theme area	Opening date
	Dazzling Dan's Fuselschleuder	Jet Ski	Zierer	Action area	2024
	Funny Boats	Bumper boats	SBF Visa Group	Enchanted Forest	—
	Primeval Times Raft Trip	Raft trip	Mack Rides	Dinoland	1997
	Wild water ride	Log fume	Mack Rides	Action area	1999
	Flintstone's Gunboats	Pedalo		Dinoland	2008
	Curse of Teutates	River rapids ride	ABC Rides	Village of the Gauls	2013

=== Other attractions ===
- Nostalgia-carousel
- Plohni's Diving Excursion
- Holzmichel-Villa
- Pony-Adventure
- Old-Timer Trip
- Crazy House
- Fairy Tale Forest
- Children's Swingboat
- Gnome Train in the Land of the Dwarfs
- Climbing Mountain
- Western rodeo
- Western railway
- Wild sow slide
- Ghost mill
- Freefall Tower (15 metres (49 ft))
- Flintstone's Journey
- Red-Baron Carousel
- Fairytale Carousel
- Bull Riding
- Trampoline Area
- Tree house (the largest of Germany)
- Magic fountains
- Tipi with Slide

=== Former attractions ===
- Sling-Shot (2003)
- Dragon Loop (removed 2010)
- Dragon Swing (removed 2016)
- Silver Mine (replaced by Dynamite 2017)

=== Shows ===
In the early years various circuses made guest appearances in the park. Furthermore, there was a large western arena in the Freizeitpark Plohn until 2013, which could accommodate up to 700 visitors. At the end of the 2012 season, the shows listed there were canceled. The reasons for this include the immense increase in GEMA fees from 2013. From the end of 2013 to the beginning of 2015, the hall for the indoor roller coaster Miniwah & The Secret of Gold Greek City was largely gutted and redesigned. Currently, there is also a mapping show about the history of Gold Greek City every hour. This indoor area with a powered coaster from Mack Rides received the FKF award from the Freundeskreis Kirmes und Freizeitparks in 2016.

Since the closure of the Western Arena as the central location for shows, various artists and have appeared in the park at changing intervals, including the Prague Marionette Theater with the tent show Plohnis Marionettencircus next to the Plohseidon roller coaster in 2014.
