= Crazy Bats =

Roller coaster at Phantasialand

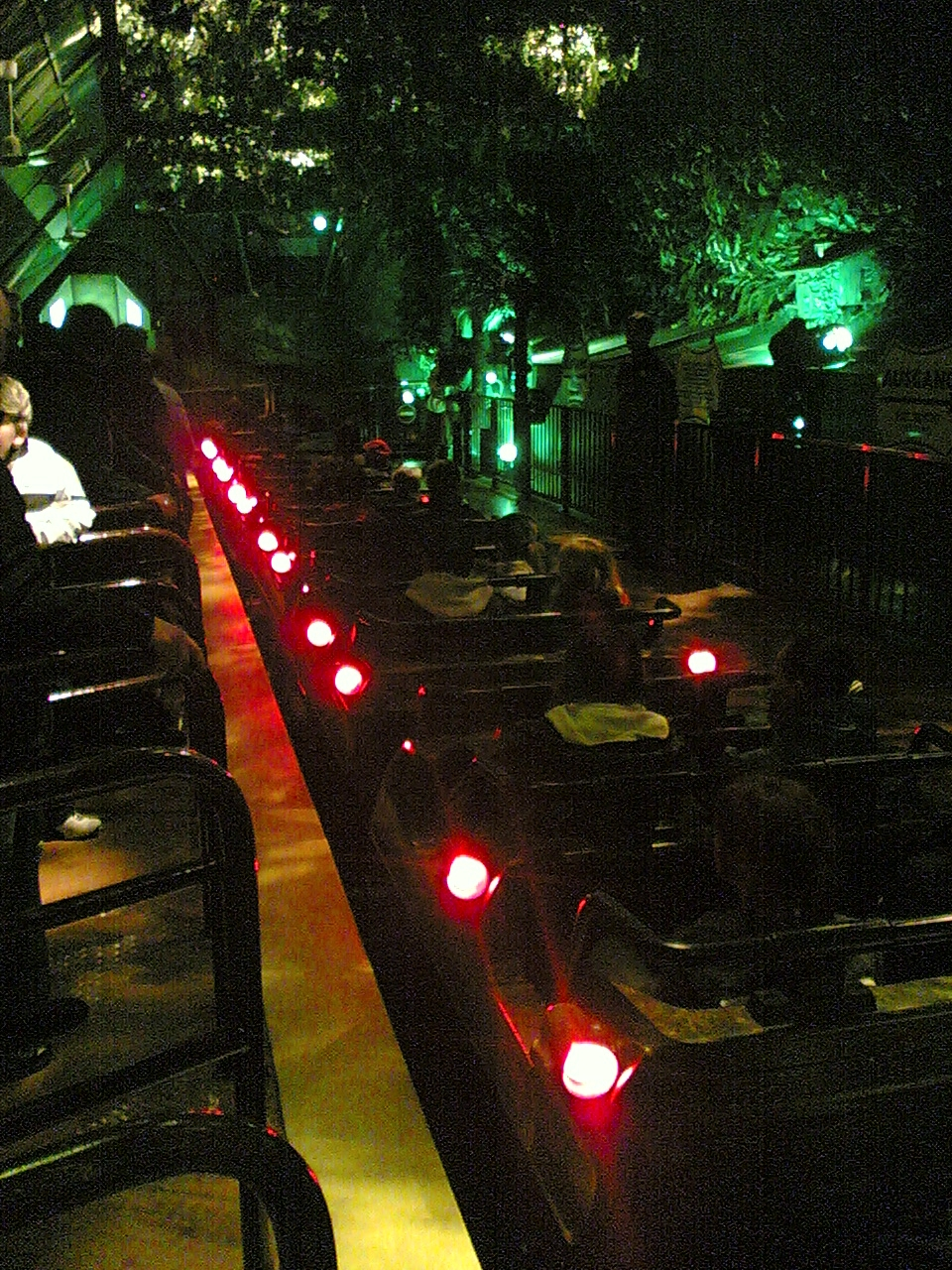

Phantasialand
- Location: Phantasialand
- Park section: Fantasy
- Coordinates: 50.801°N 6.878°E
- Status: Operating
- Opening date: April 1, 1988
- Cost: DM 15 million
- Replaced: Oldtimerbahn; Santa-Fe-Western-Express

General statistics
- Type: Steel – Enclosed
- Manufacturer: Vekoma
- Designer: Werner Stengel
- Model: Custom MK-900
- Height: 38.4 ft (11.7 m)
- Length: 3,851.7 ft (1,174.0 m)
- Speed: 28.9 mph (46.5 km/h)
- Duration: 4:00
- Capacity: 1600 riders per hour
- Trains: 4 trains with 7 cars; riders arranged 2 across in 2 rows for a total of 28 riders per train
- Theme: Castle
- Crazy Bats at RCDB

Crazy Bats, formerly known as Space Center and Temple of the Night Hawk is an enclosed roller coaster located at Phantasialand. It opened on 1 April 1988 and was manufactured by Vekoma.

== History and layout ==
Opened in 1988 after 18 months of construction, the ride was originally called Space Center. The queue displayed alien animatronics and A Space Shuttle model hang above the station. The silver trains led passengers past models of rockets and emulated asteroids, and the darkened hall was dimly lit with lights resembling stars. During the end of the ride, the visitors were attacked by another spacecraft.

Due to the construction of neighbouring themed area Wuze Town in 2001, the roller coaster was rethemed and renamed Temple of the Night Hawk. It should represent a god of the fictional population of the area. There were plans to cover the roof of the hall with plants or a giant camouflage net, but both of them were not implemented. The walls of the queueline were coloured green, brown and yellow, the loading station was themed as a jungle and the trains were recoloured in brown. The ride itself didn't have much theming: Until 2010, a green hawk was projected in the hall and the first lifthill was lighted with strobe lights. Other that, the ride in the ride took place in complete darkness.

Until 2014, the song "The Egg Travels" from Disney's Dinosaur was played by several speakers placed inside the hall. In the station of the roller coaster, the song "Inner Sanctum/The Nesting Grounds" and the intro of the song "The End Of Our Island" from the same movie were played. In 2015, these songs were replaced with custom songs produced by IMAscore.

On March 31, 2019, the park announced that the roller coaster would be transformed into a VR attraction called Crazy Bats. Crazy Bats reopened on June 25, 2019, after being closed for renovations since April 1, 2019. The VR film features three bats from the film Monster Family. The queue was redesigned to represent an ice cave, while the station resembles a castle. The coaster can be ridden with a VR headset, although children below a height of 1.20 metres (3.93 ft) are not allowed to use it.. The film shows three bats accidentally freezing the visitor in a block of ice, as well as their chaotic attempts to free the visitor. At the end of the ride, the three bats propose to the visitor in a chapel and give them a mirror, which reveals that the visitor actually slipped into the role of a female bat.

During the COVID-19 pandemic, the attraction could only be used without a VR headset.

== Technical data ==
The ride has four trains, and one spare train for repairs, each with seven cars. Each car has two rows of seats, each holding two people. During the four-minute ride, the trains traverse 1,174 metres (3,852 ft) of track, utilizing three lift hills. The building containing the ride is around 120,000 cubic metres (4,200,000 cu ft), and rests on 180 concrete pillars buried 12 metres (39 ft) deep in the ground. The building's basement level contained the Hollywood Tour dark ride before the latter was closed. The total investment for the ride was around 15 million DM.

Originally, the coaster was to be manufactured by BHS/Zierer, with linear induction motors (LIMs) as transport elements. After a track layout had been designed and models created, the park instead decided to work with Vekoma, and to utilize lift hills over LIMs.

The VR film was produced by Ambient Entertainment and Mack Media and consists of 50,000 individual images. According to the park, one billion pixels per second are displayed on the VR headset, roughly six times more than in a feature film. The bats' fur consists of approximately two million individual hairs. Furthermore, every movement of the bats was individually animated. The VR headsets have permanently installed displays, special lenses and integrated headphones. The soundtrack was produced by IMAscore.
