= El Toro (Freizeitpark Plohn) =

Wooden roller coaster at Freizeitpark Plohn

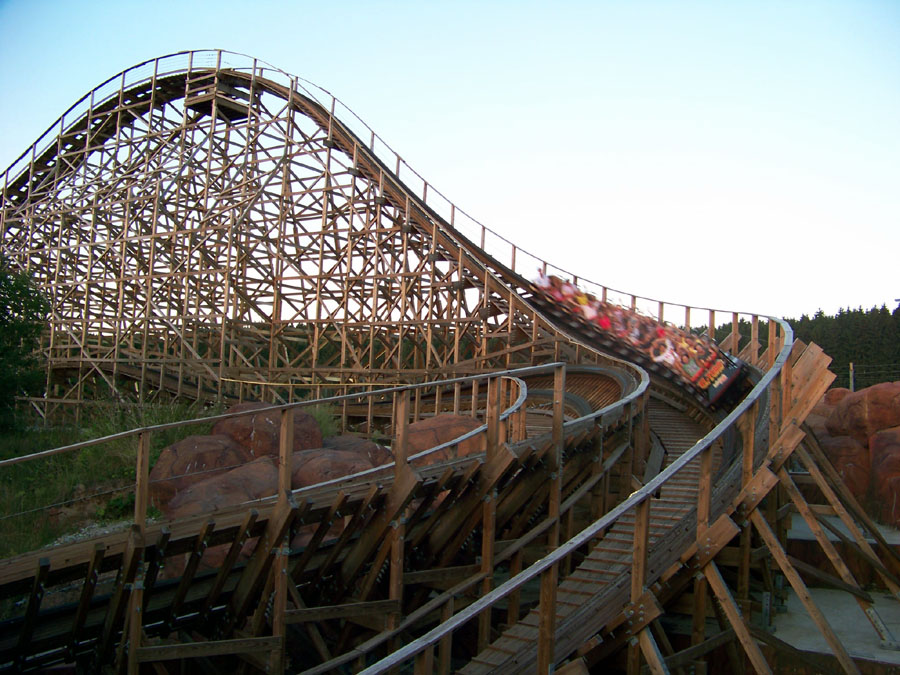

Freizeitpark Plohn
- Location: Freizeitpark Plohn
- Coordinates: 50.565953°N 12.400985°E
- Status: Operating
- Opening date: 10 April 2009

General statistics
- Type: Wood
- Manufacturer: Great Coasters International
- Height: 24.5 m (80 ft)
- Drop: 21.5 m (71 ft)
- Length: 725.1 m (2,379 ft)
- Speed: 73.4 km/h (45.6 mph)
- Inversions: 0
- Trains: Single train with 12 cars; riders arranged 2 across in a single row for a total of 24 riders per train
- El Toro at RCDB

El Toro is a wooden roller coaster at Freizeitpark Plohn in Germany. It is the third roller coaster built by Great Coasters International (GCI) in Europe, after Thunderbird at PowerPark in Finland and Troy at Toverland in the Netherlands. It cost 5.1 million EUR and was by the European Regional Development Fund.

== Ride ==
The ride has a length of 725.1 metres (2,379 ft) and a height of 24.5 metres (80 ft). The trains have a top speed of 73.4 kilometres per hour (45.6 mph). It passes through two tunnels under a log flume.

== Train ==
El Toro has one train with twelve cars. Passengers are placed two in a row for a total of twenty-four passengers per train. It features GCI's Millennium Flyer trains.

== Rankings ==
Golden Ticket Awards: Top wood Roller Coasters
Year									1998	1999
Ranking									–	–
Year	2000	2001	2002	2003	2004	2005	2006	2007	2008	2009
Ranking	–	–	–	–	–	–	–	–	–	–
Year	2010	2011	2012	2013	2014	2015	2016	2017	2018	2019
Ranking	–	35	34	23	29	37	–	–	–	47
Year	2020	2021	2022	2023	2024	2025	2026			
Ranking	N/A	40	–	–	–	48	50			
