= Mack Rides BigDipper =

Type of steel roller coaster by Mack Rides

BigDipper is a type of steel roller coasters by Mack Rides. Being the first of its kind, the roller coaster Lost Gravity opened at Walibi Holland in March 2016.

== Driving system ==
The trains run on steel rails. The short trains make it possible to drive through very tight curve radii. The roller coasters are basically driven by a chain lift hill, whereby the wagon after the lift covers the rest of the distance solely through gravity.

== Trains ==
The trains consist of individual wagons with two rows each. In each row there are four seats next to each other, with the two inner seats placed above the rail and the outer two next to the rail. The outer seats are also slightly offset upwards. This means there is space for 8 people in one train.

== Installations ==
Picture	Name	Amusement park	Layout	Opening date	Status
	Lost Gravity	Walibi Holland	Custom	24 March 2016	Operating
	Dynamite	Freizeitpark Plohn	Custom	18 May 2019	Operating
	Helios	Fantasiana	Custom	12 April 2025	Operating
	Wiener Looping	Prater	Custom	23 May 2025	Operating
