= Lost Gravity =

Roller coaster in Walibi Holland

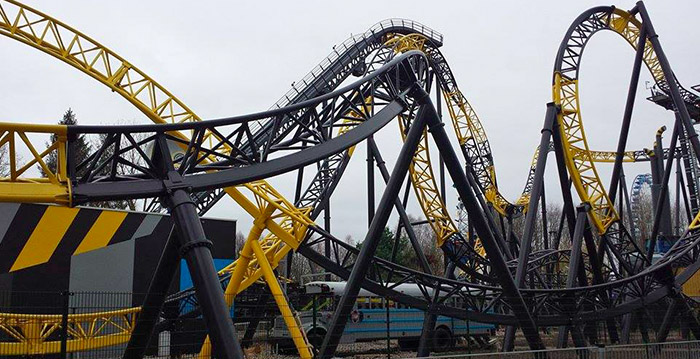
- Lost Gravity

Walibi Holland
- Location: Walibi Holland
- Park section: Zero Zone
- Coordinates: 52.4424°N 5.7663°E
- Status: Operating
- Opening date: 24 March 2016

General statistics
- Type: Steel
- Manufacturer: Mack Rides
- Model: BigDipper
- Lift/launch system: Chain lift hill
- Height: 32 m (105 ft)
- Length: 680 m (2,230 ft)
- Speed: 87 km/h (54 mph)
- Inversions: 2
- Duration: 2:33
- Max vertical angle: 90°
- Capacity: 800 riders per hour
- G-force: 4.4
- Height restriction: 140 cm (4 ft 7 in)
- Trains: 4 trains with a single car. Riders are arranged 4 across in 2 rows for a total of 8 riders per train.
- Speedypass available
- Lost Gravity at RCDB

Lost Gravity is a steel roller coaster at Walibi Holland, located in Biddinghuizen, Flevoland, Netherlands which was manufactured by Mack Rides and constructed by RCS GmbH, opening to the public on 24 March 2016.

== History ==
Construction on the ride was completed in January 2016. The design of the trains was revealed on 19 February 2016 and a week later, testing began.

The official soundtrack of Lost Gravity, Move Up (Lost Gravity) Mr. Polska, was released on 17 March 2016. The roller coaster opened on 24 March 2016.

== Ride ==
The wagons are pulled to a height of 32 metres (105 ft) using a chain lift hill and reach a top speed of 87 kilometres per hour (54 mph). Two inversions were also installed on the route: a dive drop and a zero-g-roll. There are also fire and water effects while driving, while they are activated by sensors on the track, the fire elements usually will not get activated.

== Design ==
2 inversions:

- Dive drop
- Zero-g roll

The ride is alternately painted yellow and black. It was the first of Mack Rides BigDipper model roller coasters. The model is unusual in that as well as having two seats above the track, each row also has two outer seats suspended on the sides of the track; one on the left and one on the right. Two Intamin coasters also utilise this seating arrangement: Skyrush at Hersheypark and Flying Aces at Ferrari World Abu Dhabi.

== Gallery ==
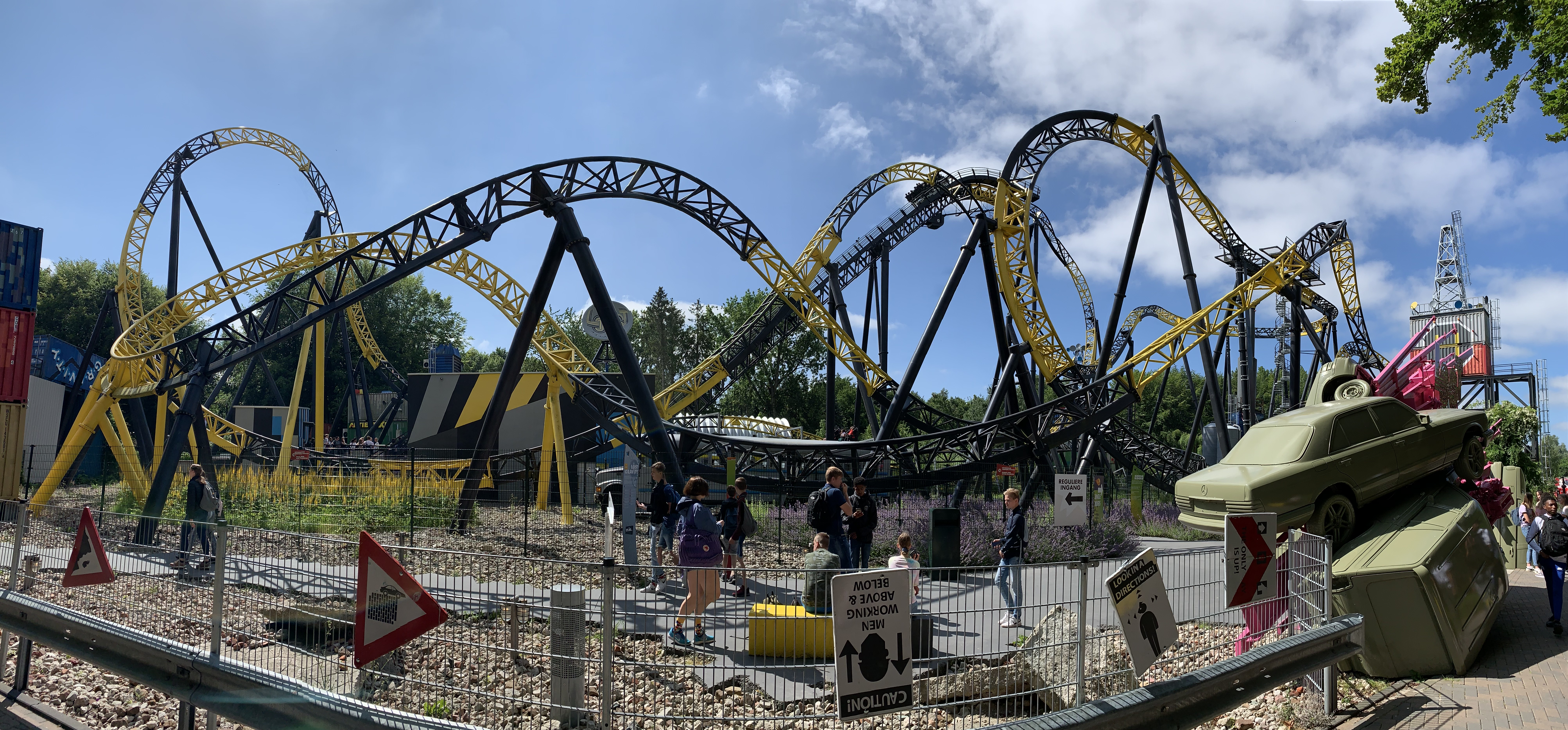
Panoramic view of Lost Gravity

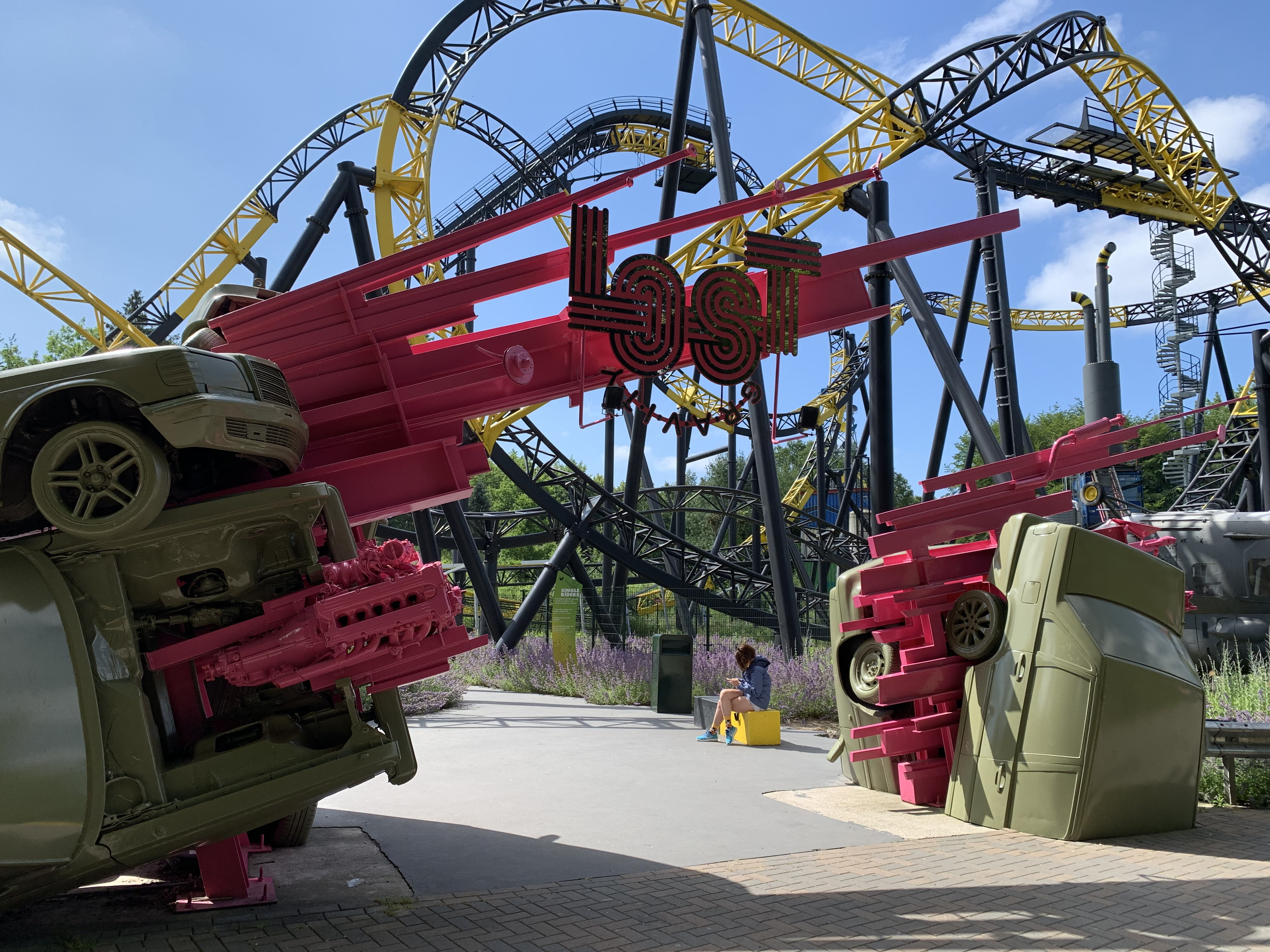
Entrance of Lost Gravity with theming

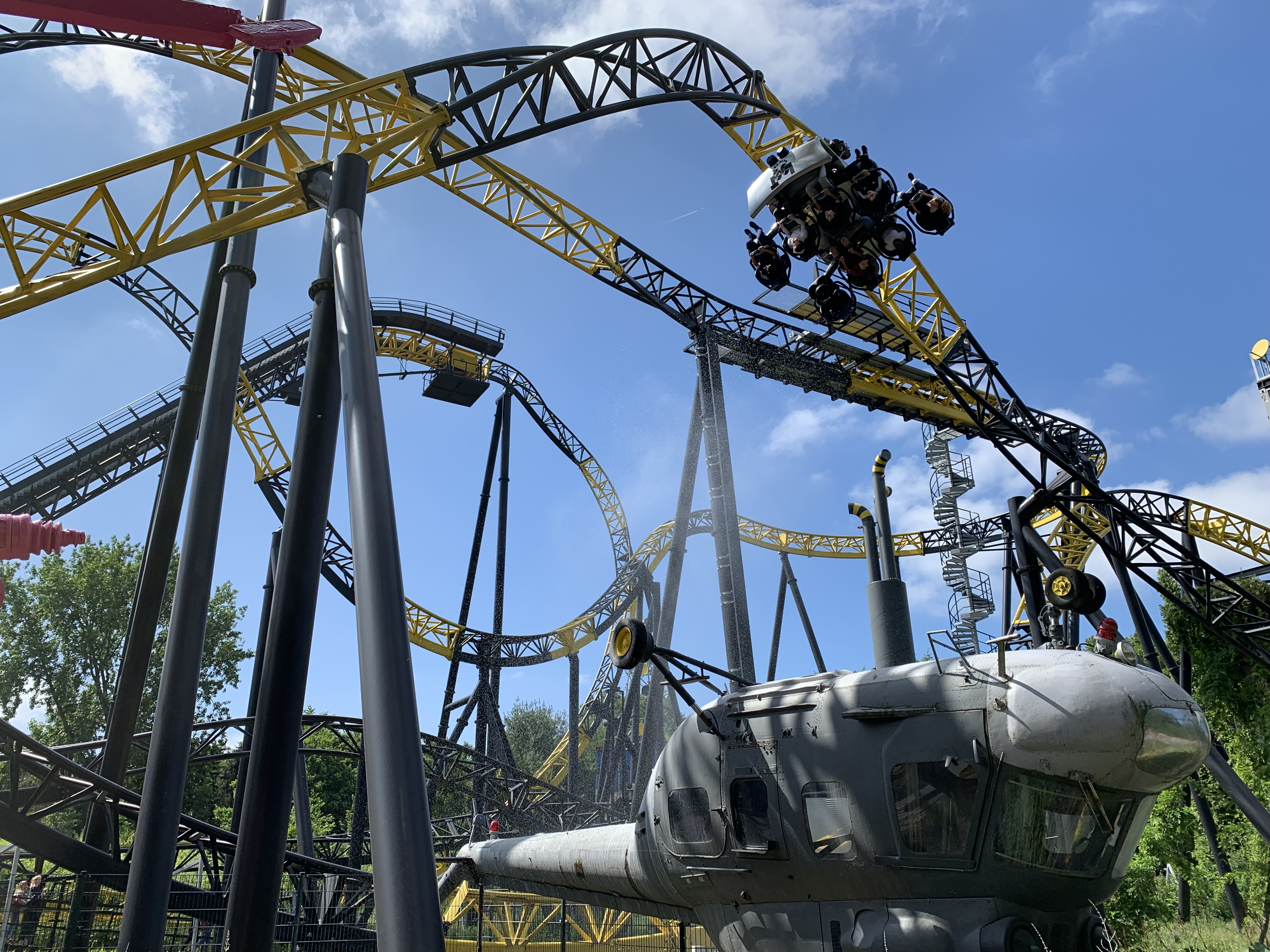
Inversion with a moving wagon
