= Hansa-Park =

Amusement park in Schleswig-Holstein, Germany

- Previously known as Hansaland - 1977 to 1987

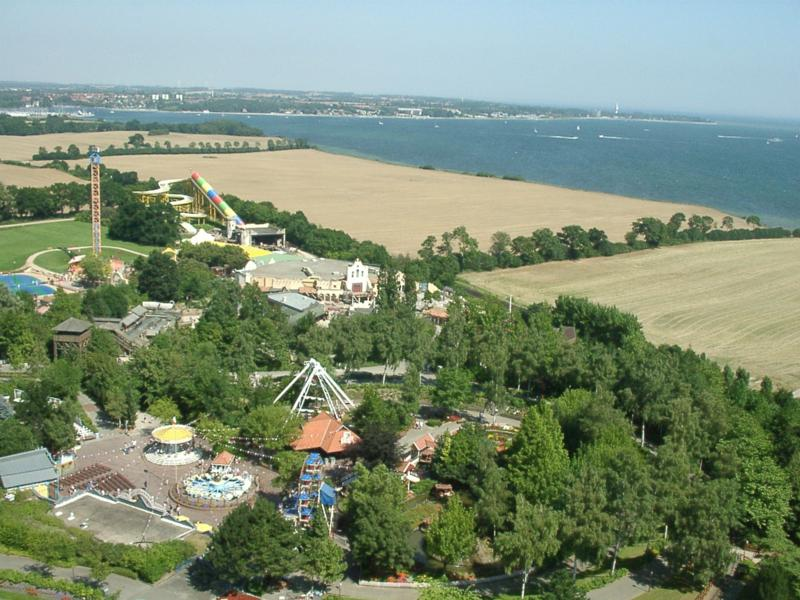
- View from Holstein Tower (2004)
- Interactive map of Hansa-Park
- Location: Sierksdorf, Schleswig-Holstein, Germany
- Coordinates: 54.0769°N 10.78°E
- Status: Operating
- Opened: May 15, 1977
- Owner: Leicht family
- General manager: Christoph Andreas Leicht
- Area: 113 acres (0.46 km^{2})

Attractions
- Total: 92
- Roller coasters: 7
- Water rides: 7
- Website: www.hansapark.de

Hansa-Park is a seasonal amusement park in Sierksdorf, Schleswig-Holstein, Germany off the Baltic Sea. It was opened on May 15, 1977 under the name Hansaland and renamed Hansa-Park in 1987. It currently spans 113 acres (0.46 km^{2}) and includes more than 125 attractions. From 1973 to 1976, the site was home to the first German Legoland.

The park is owned by the Leicht family and managed by Christoph Andreas Leicht. The park attracts more than a million visitors each year, making it the fifth largest German amusement park. Stern magazine, in collaboration with the BAT Freizeit-Forschungsinstitut (Leisure Research Institute) tested the ten leading German amusement parks. Hansa-Park scored second place behind Europa-Park overall and first place in the north. The Family Park by the Sea was the first German amusement park to receive the OK for Kids seal of approval from the Deutscher Kinderschutzbund (the German Association for the Protection of Children) and TÜV Nord (Technical Inspection Association, North) for the whole park.

The grounds are divided into eleven different themed areas, including Adventure Land, Old-Time Fun Fair, Beautiful Britain, The Realms of the North, Fiesta del Mar, HANSA Garden, The Hanseatic League in Europe, Peterhof of Novgorod, New Lübeck, Water Fun and Land of the Vikings. Each of these areas contains rides and shows consistent with its theme. The park's special charm lies in its careful and detailed use of theming, with many little gags positioned along the way to the large attractions.

== List of rides ==
=== Roller coasters ===
Picture	Name	Safety Restrictions	Type	Max. Height	Length	Max. Speed	Manufacturer	Opened	Duration	Park Section
	Nessie Superrollercoaster	At least 10 years old or w/adult, must be under 1.95 metres (6.4 ft) tall	Steel roller coaster	26 metres (85 ft)	840 metres (2,760 ft)	90 kilometres per hour (56 mph)	Schwarzkopf	1980	2:10 min	Beautiful Britain
	Royal Scotsman	At least 10 years old or w/adult	Steel roller coaster	16 metres (52 ft)	522 metres (1,713 ft)	50 kilometres per hour (31 mph)	Vekoma	1993	1:10 min	Beautiful Britain
	Crazy Mine	At least 9 years old and 1.10 metres (3.6 ft) tall	Steel roller coaster	13 metres (43 ft)	370 metres (1,210 ft)	45 kilometres per hour (28 mph)	Maurer Söhne	1997	1:10 min	Adventure Land
	Escape of Novgorod	At least 1.25 metres (4.1 ft) tall	Steel roller coaster	40 metres (130 ft)	700 metres (2,300 ft)	100 kilometres per hour (62 mph)	Gerstlauer	2009	1:50 min	Peterhof of Novgorod
	Midgard Serpent	At least 1.00 metre (3.28 ft) tall	Steel roller coaster	10 metres (33 ft)	200 metres (660 ft)	40 kilometres per hour (25 mph) to 45 kilometres per hour (28 mph)	Gerstlauer	2011	1:40 min	Land of the Vikings
	The Oath of Kärnan	At least 1.25 metres (4.1 ft) tall	Steel roller coaster	73 metres (240 ft)	1,235 metres (4,052 ft)	127 kilometres per hour (79 mph)	Gerstlauer	2015		The Realms of the North
	The Little Tsar	At least 6 years old Accompanied by an adult Up to 5 years old At least 0.95 metres (3.1 ft) tall	Steel roller coaster	3 metres (9.8 ft)	54 metres (177 ft)	20 kilometres per hour (12 mph)	Preston & Barbieri	2017		Old-Time Fun Fair

=== Water rides ===
Picture	Name	Safety Restrictions	Type	Max. Height	Length	Manufacturer	Opened	Duration	Park Section
	Awilda's Adventure Ride	at least 0.9 metres (2.95 ft) tall, adult required if under 1.0 metre (3.3 ft)	Baby Flume	3 metres (9.8 ft)	83 m	Soquet	2021	-	The Realms of the North
	Barracuda Slide	at least 8 years old and 25 kg or w/adult	raft water slide	12 metres (39 ft)	-	van Egdom	1998	-	Land of the Vikings
	Flower Magic Boat Tour	-	boat ride	-	-	Mack Rides	1977	-	Old-Time Fun Fair
	Stormy Dragon Boat Ride	at least 2 years old, adult required if under 6	Mini log flume	7 metres (23 ft)	160 m	L&T Systems	2007	-	Land of the Vikings
	Störtebeker's Sea Raid	at least 10 years old or w/adult	River rapids ride	20.4 metres (67 ft)	213 m	White Water West	2000	-	The Realms of the North
	Super Splash	at least 10 years old or w/adult	Log flume	20 metres (66 ft)	-	Intamin	1986	-	Water Fun
	Wild Water Ride – The Great Pike	at least 10 years old or w/adult	Log flume	15 metres (49 ft)	-	Mack Rides / Arrow Dynamics	1977	-	Peterhof of Novgorod

=== Other attractions ===
Picture	Name	Safety Restrictions	Type	Max. Height	Manufacturer	Opened	Park Section
	1903 Somerset Traffic	up to 1.35 metres (4.43 ft) tall	Mini bumper cars	-	-	1992	Beautiful Britain
	Akira, The Giraffe	-	Playground	-	-	?	Old-Time Fun Fair
	Animal Babies of Peterhof	-	Turntable Carousel	-	Wooddesign	2022	Peterhof of Novgorod
	Apache Lodge Tree House	at least 4 years old, adult required if under 7 years	Obstacle course	-	-	2006	Adventureland
	Awilda's Lookout	at least 1.0 metre (3.3 ft) tall, adult required if under 1.2 metres (3.9 ft)	Family drop tower	11 metres (36 ft)	Zierer	2021	The Realms of the North
	Ball & Bounce House	up to 1.40 metres (4.6 ft) tall	Ball pit	-	-	1990	Beautiful Britain
	Barcos del Mar	at least 0.9 metres (2.95 ft) tall, adult required if under 9 years	ApolloSidecar	-	Technical Park	2018	Fiesta del Mar
	Beach Trucks at the Pirate Camp	at least 1.00 metre (3.28 ft) tall	Convoy ride	-	Marcel Lutz	2022	The Hanseatic League in Europe
	Bear Sleigh	-	Playground	-	-	?	Peterhof of Novgorod
	Bouncy Hills	up to 1.30 metres (4.3 ft)	Trampolines	-	-	2014	Land of the Vikings
	Camino del Mar	-	Water playground	-	-	2007	Fiesta del Mar
	Carrousel Baltique	-	Carousel	-	Concept 1900	2023	The Hanseatic League in Europ
	Children's Swing Boat Ride	up to 1.40 metres (4.6 ft) tall	Swing boats	-	-	1977	Old-Time Fun Fair
	Cog Ship Ride	at least 8 years old	Spinning ship ride	-	Mack Rides	1977	Old-Time Fun Fair
	Donkey Cart	-	Playground	-	-	?	The Realms of the North
	Dr Livingstone's Safari Flight	5–10 years old	Red Baron	-	Technical Park	2005	Old-Time Fun Fair
	Einar's Fjord Cruise	at least 0.9 metres (2.95 ft) tall, adult required if under 8 years	Kontiki	-	Zierer	2025	Land of the Vikings
	Elin's Travels through the Sky	at least 1.05 metres (3.4 ft) tall	Mini drop tower	7.5 metres (24.6 ft)	Zamperla	2001	Land of the Vikings
	Flying Dutchman	at least 8 years old	pirate ship	20 metres (66 ft)	Huss	1981	Old-Time Fun Fair
	Flying Orcas	at least 1.10 metres (3.6 ft) tall	flying spinning whale ride	6 metres (20 ft)	Huss	1998	Land of the Vikings
	Fondacio dei Tedeschi	at least 6 years old	Indoor playground	-	Eli Play	2014	The Hanseatic League in Europe
	Gamble Hall	-	Arcade	-		1977	New Lübeck
	Gold Prospecting	-	Gold panning attraction	-	-	1977	New Lübeck
	Hall of Mirrors	-	Hall of mirrors	-	-	?	Old-Time Fun Fair
	The HANSA Carousel	-	Carousel	-	Bertazzon	2004	The Hanseatic League in Europe
	HANSA-PARK Express	children up to 5 years must be seated next to an adult.	Minimum-gauge railway	-	Gebrüder Ihle Bruchsal	1977	Touring the park with stops in HANSA Garden, New Lübeck, Peterhof of Novgorod, and Land of the Vikings
	HANSA Swing Ride	at least 7 years old and 1.00 metre (3.28 ft) tall	children's swing carousel	10 metres (33 ft)	Wood-Design	2016	Old-Time Fun Fair
	Hanse Bowl	-	Gambling	-	-	2014	Beautiful Britain
	Highlander	at least 1.40 metres (4.6 ft) tall	Drop Tower	120 metres (390 ft)	Funtime	2019	Beautiful Britain
	Indian River	at least 4 years old	Children's boat ride	-	SBF Visa Group	2001	New Lübeck
	Jungle Jeep	-	Playground	-	-	?	Old-Time Fun Fair
	Kärnapulten	at least 1.25 metres (4.1 ft) tall	Sky Fly	22 metres (72 ft)	Gerstlauer	2017	The Realms of the North
	The Lost Trails of Roanoke	at least 4 years old	Obstacle course	-	Emsland Spiel- und Freizeitgeräte	2024	Adventureland
	Low-Rope Garden	-	Low-rope course	-	Künstlerische Holzgestaltung Bergmann GmbH	2009	Water Fun
	Luftikus	-	Swing ride	-	Gundelwein	1992	Old-Time Fun Fair
	Mail Coach	-	Playground	-	-	?	New Lübeck
	The Navajo Trail High-Rope Garden	at least 6 years old, 1.10 metres (3.6 ft) to 2.10 metres (6.9 ft) tall	High-rope course	7 metres (23 ft) to 10 metres (33 ft)	Faszinatour	2006	Adventure Land
	New Lübeck Derby	-	Gambling	-	-	1977	New Lübeck
	Patio del Mar	-	Playground	-	-	2022	Fiesta del Mar
	Peterhof Tower	at least 1.05 metres (3.4 ft) tall	Interactive tower	7 metres (23 ft)	Sunkid Heege	2022	Peterhof of Novgorod
	Pirates Camp	up to 1.20 metres (3.9 ft) tall	Indoor playground	-	-	2022	The Hanseatic League in Europe
	Pony Express	4–12 years old, at least 1.10 metres (3.6 ft) tall	Electric pony ride	-	Metallbau Emmeln	2001	New Lübeck
	Pow-Wow	at least 8 years old	Teacups	-	Zamperla	1995	Adventure Land
	Rain Dance	-	Water playground	-	-	?	Adventure Land
	Remote-controlled boats	-	Remotely controlled boats	-	-	?	HANSA Garden
	Safari Jeeps	4–12 years old	Mini Jeeps	-	Metallbau Emmeln	before 1987	Old-Time Fun Fair
	Shooting Gallery	-	Shooting gallery	-	-	1977	New Lübeck
	Slide	-	Slide	-	-	?	New Lübeck
	Space Scooter	-	Bumper cars	-	Bertazzon / Mack Rides	2002	The Hanseatic League in Europe
	Störtebeker's Raft Trip	-	Rope ferry	-	-	before 2007	Land of the Vikings
	Störtebeker's Rope Ladder Climb		Gambling	-	-	2014	Beautiful Britain
	Super Splash Water Playground	-	Water playground	-	-	2012	Water Fun
	Swing Boat	-	Pirate ship	20 metres (66 ft)	Huss	1981	Old-Time Fun Fair
	Tahiti Trail	up to 1.40 metres (4.6 ft) tall	Indoor playground	-	-	2012	Beautiful Britain
	Trolls' Playground	-	Playground	-	-	2012	The Hanseatic League in Europe
	Viking Baptism	-	Water playground	-	-	?	Land of the Vikings
	Viking Boat Trip	at least 1.10 metres (3.6 ft) tall	Spinning boat ride	-	Mack Rides	1998	Land of the Vikings
	Wall Climbing	-	Climbing wall	-	-	?	Adventure Land
	Wave Rider	at least 8 years old	Troika	-	Huss	1978	Thrill Rides

=== Former rides ===
Picture	Name	Type	Max. Height	Manufacturer	Opened	Closed
	The Bell	Pendulum ride	28 metres (92 ft)	Funtime	2008	2019
	Driving and Flight Simulators	Simulator rides	-	Thomson Simulation	1994	2006
	El Paso Express	Superbob	10 metres (33 ft)	BHS / Schwarzkopf	1989	2015
	Flying Shark	Ranger	26 metres (85 ft)	Huss	1991	2019
	Holstein Tower	Gyro tower	100 metres (328 ft)	Huss	1987	2025
	Monte-Zuma	Drop tower	50 metres (160 ft)	Maurer Söhne	2000	2012
	Russische Schaukel	Historic ferris wheel	-	Werner Robrahn	1990	2014
	Seeschlange	Tivoli Large	8 metres (26 ft)	Zierer	1977	1992
	Sturmvogel	Pendulum ride	18 metres (59 ft)	Schwarzkopf	1991	2012
	Torre del Mar	Swing ride	70 metres (230 ft)	Funtime	2005	2015

== Shows and events ==
The Mexican theme world hosts the International Variety Show, the Multi-Media- & Special-Effect-Show, a cinema showing 4D films and The Talking Fountain, a fountain with hidden speakers and water syringes. It is also the starting point of the daily HANSA-PARK Parade. There is a children's show in the Old-Time Fun Fair theme world and a Water Circus featuring Patagonian Sea Lions.

There are various seasonal Park Events.
