= Lengenfeld =

- Town
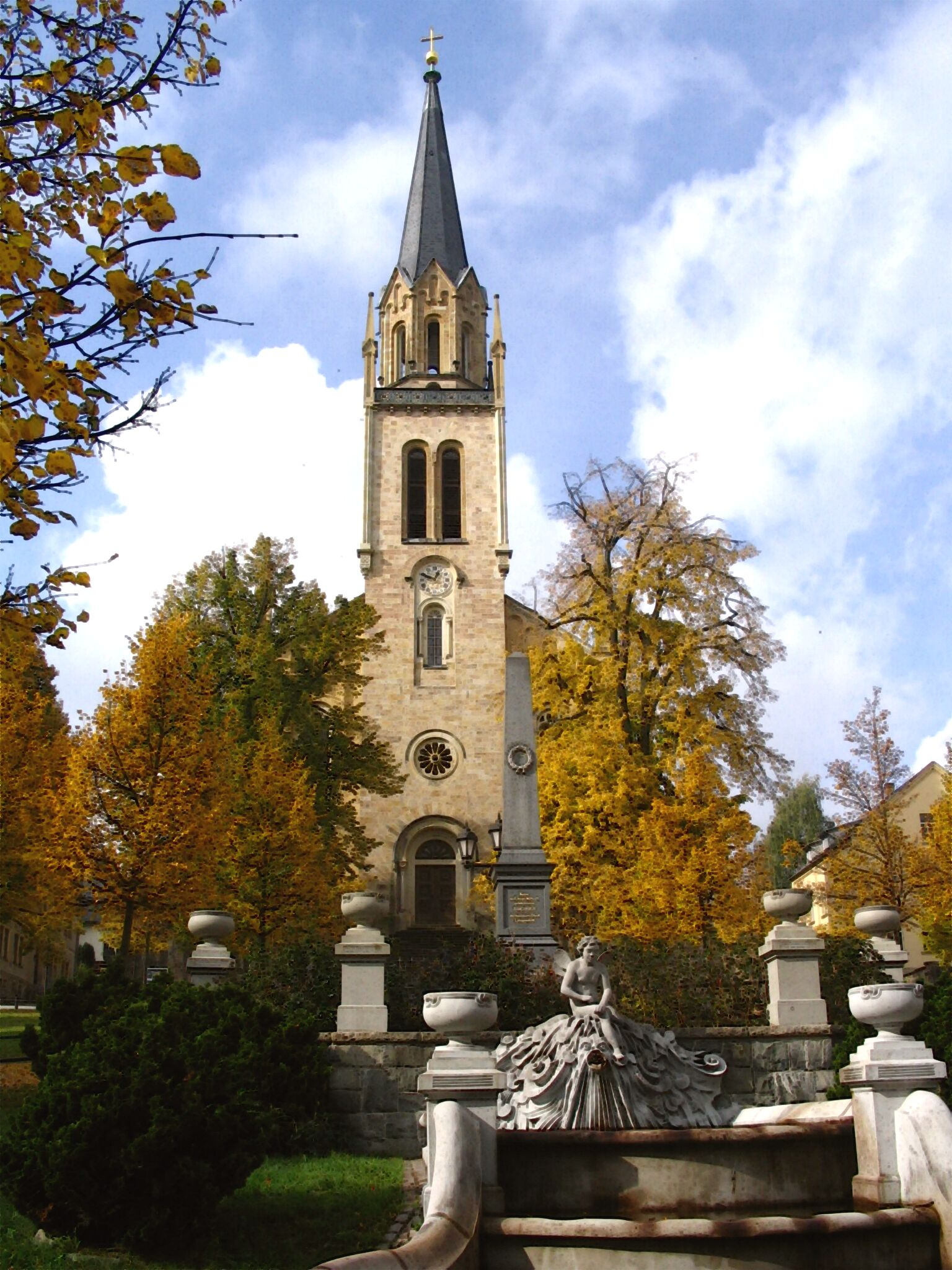
- Church of Saint Aegidius

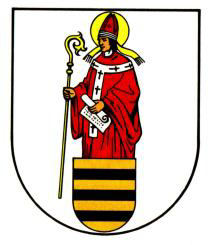
- Coat of arms

- Location of Lengenfeld within Vogtlandkreis district
- Interactive map of Lengenfeld
- Location within Germany Location within Saxony
- Coordinates: 50°34′N 12°22′E
- Country: Germany
- State: Saxony
- District: Vogtlandkreis
- Subdivisions: 9

Government
  - Mayor (2018–25): Volker Bachmann

Area
  - Total: 46.98 km^{2} (18.14 sq mi)
- Elevation: 403 m (1,322 ft)

Population (2025-12-31)
  - Total: 6,786
  - Density: 144.4/km^{2} (374.1/sq mi)
- Time zone: UTC+01:00 (CET)
  - Summer (DST): UTC+02:00 (CEST)
- Postal codes: 08485
- Dialling codes: 037606
- Vehicle registration: V, AE, OVL, PL, RC
- Website: www.stadt-lengenfeld.de

Lengenfeld (German pronunciation: [ˈlɛŋənˌfɛlt]) is a town in the Vogtlandkreis district, in the Free State of Saxony in eastern Germany. The town is situated 19 km southwest of Zwickau, and 18 km northeast of Plauen.

== History ==
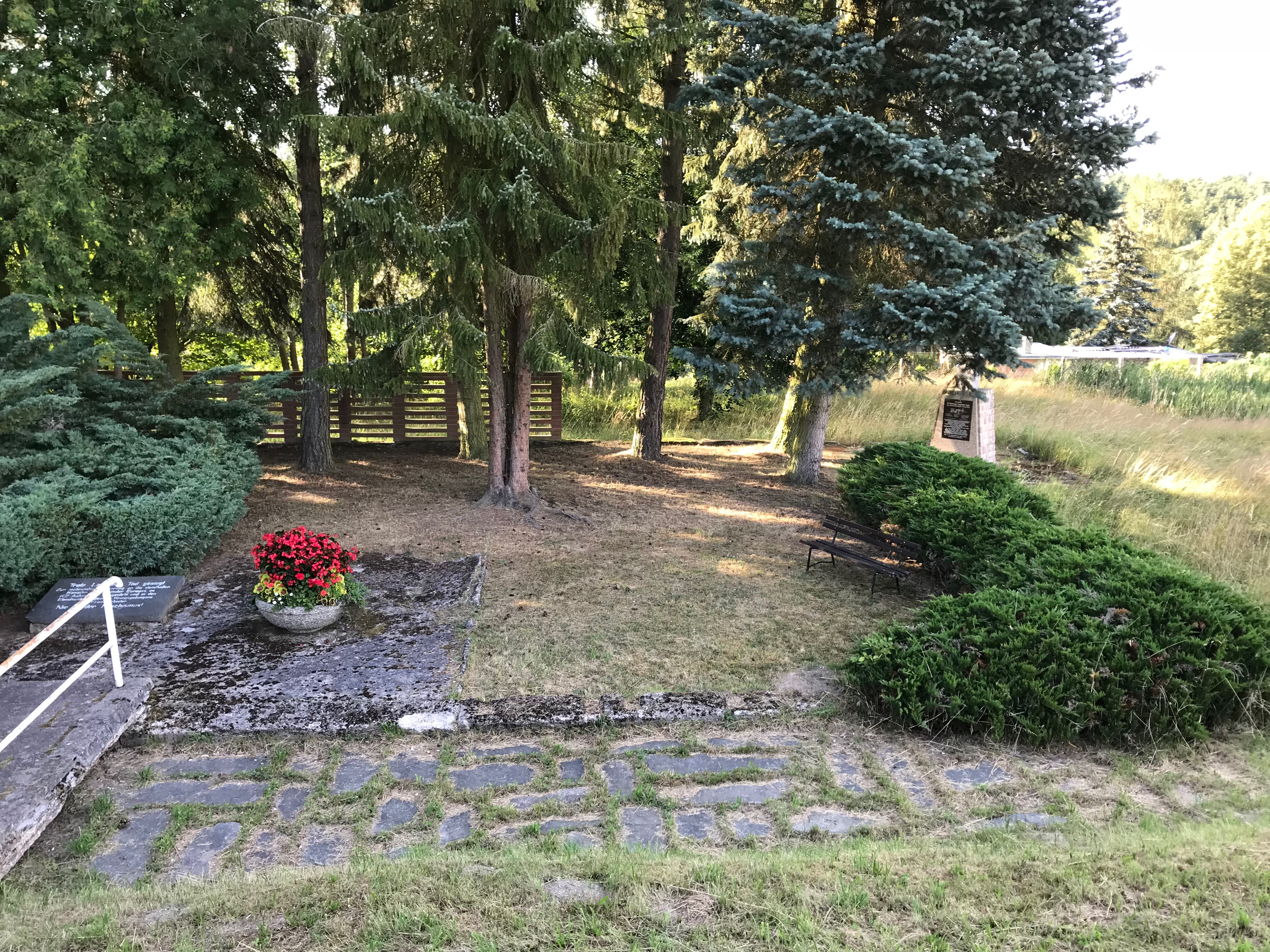
Memorial to the victims of the local subcamp of the Flossenbürg concentration camp

During World War II, Germany operated a forced labour subcamp of the Nazi prison in the town in Zwickau, and a subcamp of the Flossenbürg concentration camp. About 1,000 prisoners, half of whom were deported from German-occupied Poland, a quarter from the Soviet Union, and larger groups among the remainder comprising French, Italian, Czech, and Hungarian Jews, were imprisoned as forced labour in the latter. 246 prisoners died in the subcamp, and were mostly cremated in nearby Reichenbach im Vogtland, and the remaining were evacuated in a death march, during which many also died.
