= Sierksdorf =

- Municipality
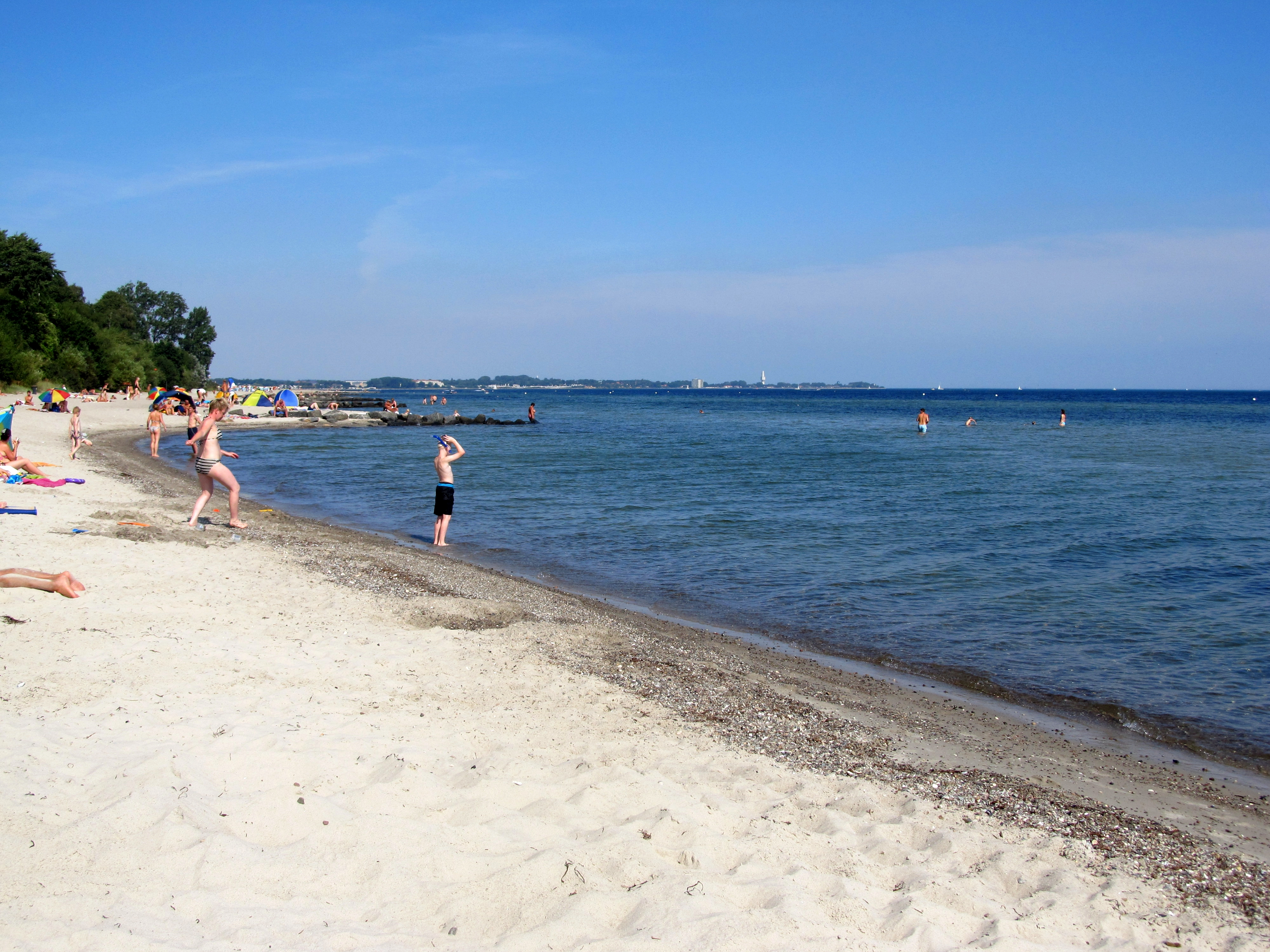
- Beach at Sierksdorf

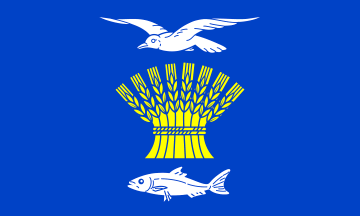
- Flag Coat of arms

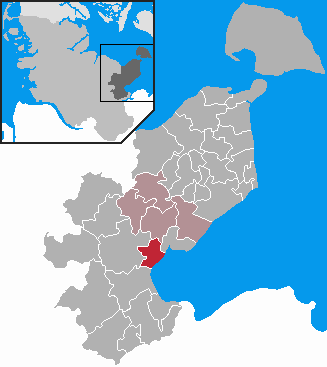
- Location of Sierksdorf within Ostholstein district
- Interactive map of Sierksdorf
- Location within Germany Location within Schleswig-Holstein
- Coordinates: 54°04′N 10°46′E
- Country: Germany
- State: Schleswig-Holstein
- District: Ostholstein
- Municipal assoc.: Ostholstein-Mitte

Government
  - Mayor: Volker Weidemann

Area
  - Total: 19.5 km^{2} (7.5 sq mi)
- Elevation: 6 m (20 ft)

Population (2025-12-31)
  - Total: 1,461
  - Density: 74.9/km^{2} (194/sq mi)
- Time zone: UTC+01:00 (CET)
  - Summer (DST): UTC+02:00 (CEST)
- Postal codes: 23730
- Dialling codes: 04563
- Vehicle registration: OH
- Website: www.amt-ostholstein- mitte.de

Sierksdorf is a municipality in the district of Ostholstein, in Schleswig-Holstein, Germany, situated on the Bay of Lübeck. The Hansa Park amusement park is located in Sierksdorf.
