= Alterface =

- Company type: SA
- Industry: Amusement park
- Founded: 2001
- Headquarters: Wavre, Belgium
- Key people: Stéphane Battaille, CEO
- Products: Salto Show Control; Interactive Dark Rides; Interactive Theatres; Erratic Dark Rides; Interactive Walkthrough; Action League
- Number of employees: 27
- Website: www.alterface.com

Alterface Projects is a manufacturer of interactive and media-based attractions. The company was founded in 2001 and is headquartered in Belgium, Europe. Alterface has a U.S. office and branches in Beijing and Xiamen, China. They create attractions for dark rides, spinning & dueling theatres, and walkthroughs.

== History ==
Founded in 2001, Alterface was a spin-off from the University of Louvain-La-Neuve (UCL) work in creation of interactive systems.

== Products ==
Alterface has developed products such as the "Salto!" show control management software, 3D and 4D shooting devices, and the non-linear & scalable Erratic Ride. The ride concept Action League combines tournament, interactive gaming, and motion.

== Notable attractions and projects ==
- Popcorn Revenge (2019, Walibi Belgium): Erratic® Ride featuring vehicles from ETF Ride Systems and theming design by Joravision. This interactive dark ride has received the Thea Award for Outstanding Achievement, Park World Excellence Award, and European Star Award.
- Basilisk (2018, Legendia, Poland): Interactive dark ride featuring vehicles from ETF Ride Systems and theming design by Joravision. In 2018, it received the Thea Award for Outstanding Achievement, Asia Attraction Crown Award, Park World Excellence Award, and European Star Award.
- Maus au Chocolat (2011, Phantasialand, Germany): Interactive dark ride featuring vehicles from ETF Ride Systems 42 3D back projection screens, on screen shooting. Interaction software, show control system and overall design were provided by Alterface Projects, turnkey of the project.
- Justice League: Alien Invasion 3D (2012, Warner Bros. Movie World, Australia): Interactive dark-ride based on DC Comics' Justice League intellectual property. It features shooting at 3D screens and at moving and non-moving scenery (animatronics). Alterface Projects provided the interaction software and overall show control system. Overall design and art direction was provided by Sally Corporation.
- Justice League: Battle for Metropolis (2015, Six Flags Over Texas and Six Flags St. Louis, United States): Interactive dark-ride based on DC Comics' Justice League intellectual property. It has motion-based vehicles from Oceaneering International, shooting at 3D screens and at moving and non-moving scenery (animatronics). Alterface Projects provided the interaction software and overall show control system. Overall design and art direction was provided by Sally Corporation.
