= Thor's Hammer (Tusenfryd) =

Amusement ride at Tusenfryd theme park, Norway

Tusenfryd
- Status: Operating
- Cost: $8.5 million
- Opening date: June 22, 2013
- Replaced: Vikingtoktet

Ride statistics
- Attraction type: Track-based motion-based 3D dark ride
- Manufacturer: ETF Ride Systems
- Designer: P&P Projects; Bjørn Solli Havard
- Model: Multi Mover with Motion Platform
- Theme: Thor, Norse mythology
- Length: 200 m (660 ft)
- Site area: 1,200 m^{2} (13,000 sq ft)
- Capacity: 1080 riders per hour
- Vehicles: 11 vehicles. Riders are arranged 3 across in 2 rows for a total of 6 riders per vehicle.
- Duration: 4 minutes
- Height restriction: 120 cm (3 ft 11 in)
- Projectors: 10
- CGI: P&P Projects
- Theming: P&P Projects
- Scenes: 11

Thor's Hammer is a motion-based 3D dark ride at the Tusenfryd theme park in Norway. Themed after Norse mythology, the ride combines motion-based ride vehicles by ETF Ride Systems with 3D projections and physical scenery by P&P Projects.

The ride opened in June 2013 as a replacement for the Vikingtoktet motion simulator attraction which closed five years prior. Aside from a 3D cinema, Thor's Hammer is the only dark ride at Tusenfryd. It was nominated for a European Star Award in 2013.

== History ==
In late 2008, Tusenfryd closed its Vikingtoktet motion simulator attraction which was located inside a cave. With a 1,200 square metres (13,000 sq ft) indoor area now vacant, park officials spent two years planning what a replacement attraction might be. In October 2012, Project Mjølner was announced by the park. Mjølner is the hammer of Thor, the Norse god of thunder. P&P Projects was contracted to design and build the ride, with a motion-based ride system being developed by ETF Ride Systems. After eight months of design and construction, Thor's Hammer officially opened to the public on June 22, 2013. Aside from the park's Alterface 3D Cinema, Nightmare, Thor's Hammer is Tusenfryd's only dark ride.

== Experience ==
Riders enter a cave to join the queue for Thor's Hammer. Once riders have boarded a vehicle it departs the station. It navigates along a 200-metre-long (660 ft) track through eleven scenes consisting of physical scenery and ten 3D screens. Pieces of physical scenery are distributed between the 3D screens to minimise the effects of transitting between the screens. The ride's story is a prequel to the Norwegian mythological story Ragnarök, a battle where Thor and his half-brother Loki are killed. Riders are tasked to retrieve Thor's hammer, which Loki has stolen. Throughout the ride, other mythological beings including Fenrir, a monstrous wolf; Surtr, a giant; and Jörmungandr, a sea serpent make appearances. One cycle of the ride lasts approximately four minutes.

== Ride system ==
The ride system used on Thor's Hammer is a first-of-its-kind system developed by ETF Ride Systems. At the 2012 IAAPA Trade Show in Orlando, Florida, ETF showcased a prototype trackless motion-based ride system, confirming a track-based version would be installed at Tusenfryd. The eleven six-seater vehicles on Thor's Hammer each feature two degrees of freedom: pitching and rolling. The vehicles can travel at a top speed of 1.8 metres per second (5.9 ft/s), spin at a rate of 10 revolutions per minute, and tilt plus or minus 8°.

P&P Projects' Philipp van Stratum compares the ride system to that of The Amazing Adventures of Spider-Man. At the time of the ride's installation in 1999, the cost of such a system would be prohibitive for most parks. He states, "the falling price of technology has made these kinds of attractions much more affordable and we can confirm that the budget for Tusenfryd is a fraction of what was paid for Spider-Man all those years ago; however we have still aim to put the bar very high." Ruud Koppens of ETF Ride Systems has echoed this sentiment.

== Reception ==
In 2013, Thor's Hammer was nominated for an IAAPA-presented European Star Award for best dark ride. The ride got second place after Etnaland's Haunted School won the category.

== See also ==
- 2013 in amusement parks
