= Phantasialand =

Theme park in Brühl, Germany

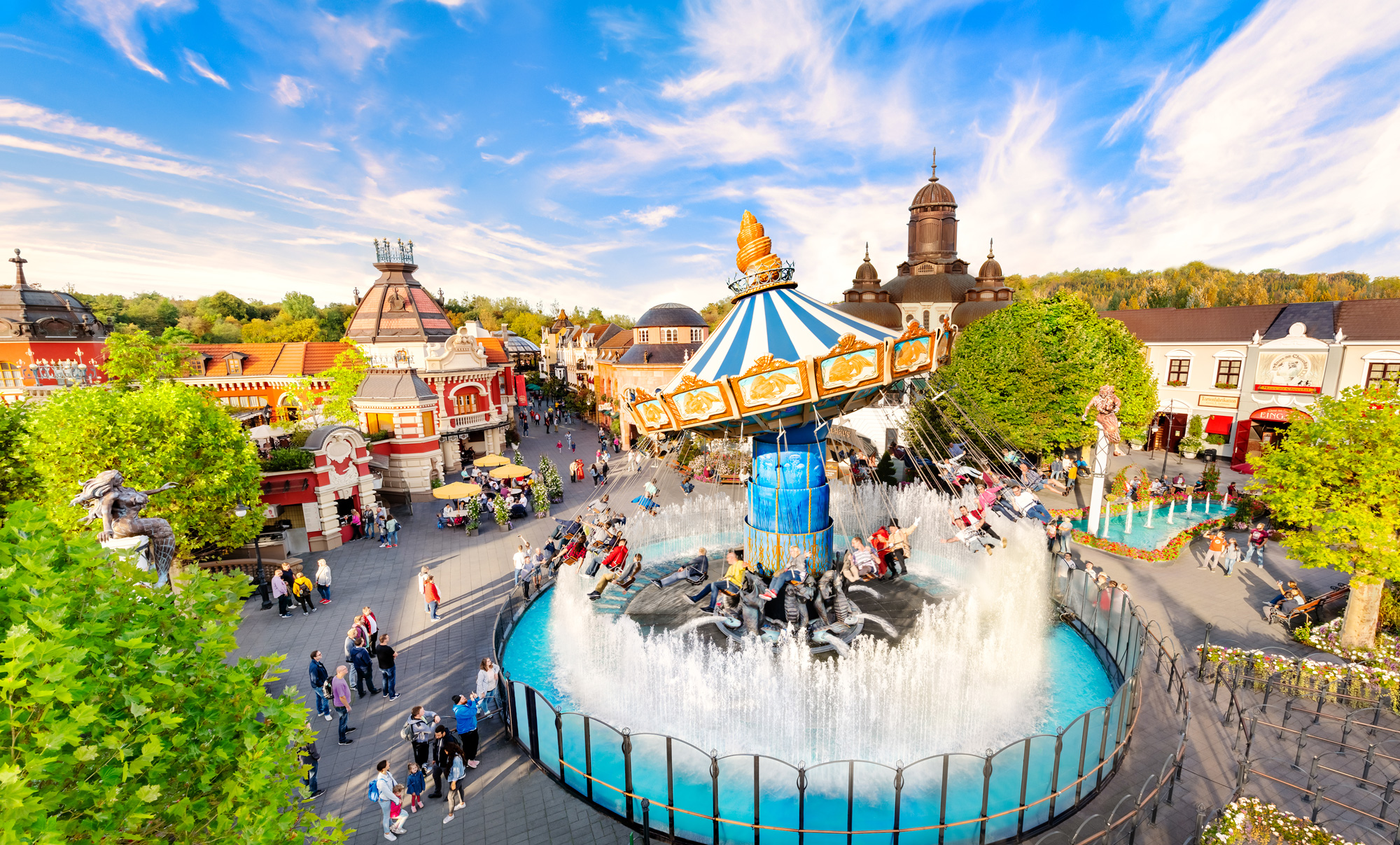
- Kaiserplatz in the Berlin-themed area
- Interactive map of Phantasialand
- Location: Brühl, North Rhine-Westphalia, Germany
- Coordinates: 50°48′00″N 6°52′46″E
- Opened: April 30, 1967; 59 years ago
- Operated by: Schmidt-Löffelhardt GmbH & Co. KG
- Attendance: 2 million
- Area: 28 ha (69 acres)

Attractions
- Total: 32
- Roller coasters: 8
- Water rides: 4
- Website: www.phantasialand.de

Phantasialand is a theme park in Brühl, North Rhine-Westphalia, Germany, that attracts approximately 2 million visitors annually. It was opened in 1967 by Gottlieb Löffelhardt and Richard Schmidt. Although starting as a family-oriented park, it has added thrill rides, especially in recent years. Following the example of Europa-Park, it has also set out to attract business customers under the slogan 'Business to Pleasure'.

Phantasialand is known for its high theming detail. It introduces new attractions more often compared to other German theme parks to compensate for its small area, and is regularly voted one of the world's best theme parks.

Among its thrill rides is Taron, the world's third fastest multi-launch coaster; Black Mamba, a Bolliger & Mabillard inverted coaster; and a themed Mine Train roller coaster called Colorado Adventure, which runs between some of the mountains in the park's Mexico section, and was opened by Michael Jackson. The most recent addition was F.L.Y., a Vekoma launched flying coaster.

== History ==
Phantasialand was opened by Gottlieb Löffelhardt and Richard Schmidt on 30 April 1967.

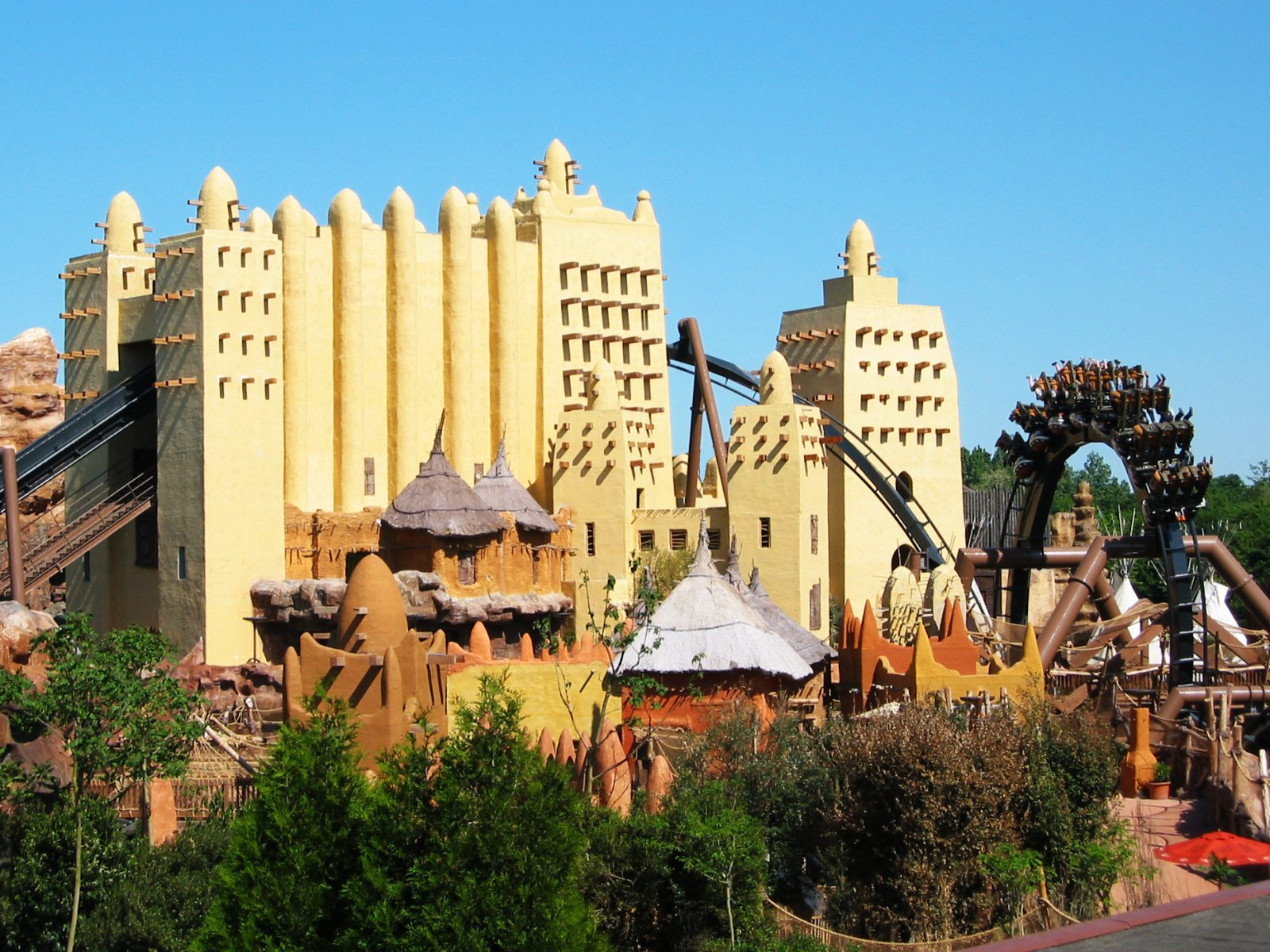
Theme area "Deep in Africa"

On 1 May 2001, a cable fire, caused by faulty wiring in the "Grand-Canyon-Bahn", destroyed two roller coasters, a theatre, and parts of the Westernstadt. The blaze caused about 38 million Deutschmarks in damage and injured 54 people. Phantasialand reopened about two weeks later after making improvements in service of fire safety, equipping every building with sprinkler systems.

Phantasialand contains Mystery Castle, an indoor Intamin ride featuring a walk through a haunted castle. Next to the castle is River Quest, a rapid river ride featuring two elevators; the ride was built by Hafema in 2002, replacing the rides Grand-Canyon-Bahn and Gebirgsbahn, which were destroyed in the 2001 cable fire. Until the construction of Infinity Falls at SeaWorld Orlando, River Quest held the record for the largest drop on a rafting ride.^{[1]} The space available was relatively small for a river rapids ride. To save space, two elevators lift boats at the start of the ride, rather than the more traditional singular lift hill.

Mystery Castle and River Quest were the only rides in the Mystery area of the park until the Klugheim area opened with the Taron and Raik roller coasters in 2016. River Quest was slightly re-themed in 2017 to fit the Klugheim theme.

In 2002, Winja's Fear & Winja's Force, two indoor spinning coasters, were built by Maurer Söhne, along with a new area named Wuze Town. An African-themed B&M inverted roller coaster named Black Mamba opened in 2006.

A four-star on-site hotel named Hotel Ling Bao opened in 2004. The hotel's roof tiles were imported from China, and every room door was hand-engraved. The hotel has two restaurants, a bar, a pool and sauna, a garden area, a spa, and an exclusive entrance to the park. A three-star hotel named Matamba opened in August 2008 in the Deep in Africa section.

Phantasialand opened another ride in 2007, named Talocan, a suspended top spin by Huss Maschinenfabrik. It is located in the Mexican section of the park. In 2008, a splash battle ride, Wakobato, opened in the lake in the old fairytale forest.

In 2010, Phantasialand opened five new attractions for children in Wuze Town: Baumberger Irrgarten, Die fröhliche Bienchenjagd, Wolke's Luftpost, Der lustige Papagei, and Würmling Express. The Berlin part of the park was also reworked, adding many Berlin-themed houses and fountains and a tribune for shows. Also new in 2010 was the show Sieben by Jan Rouven.

In 2011, Phantasialand opened two new attractions: Maus au Chocolat, an ETF dark ride in Alt Berlin, and a chair-swing on the Kaisersplatz. The old shop in the Berlin section was replaced by a funhouse-style attraction called Verrücktes Hotel Tartüff, which opened in 2012.

For the 2013 season, Phantasialand built a new log flume-style attraction to replace their two previous water attractions. The attraction is embedded in a large area of canyons and mountains. A miniature model was displayed in the park during construction. Chiapas: DIE Wasserbahn (Chiapas: THE Log Flume) opened on the 1st of April 2014.

After the winter season 2013–14, the Western-themed town area Silver City and the dark ride Silbermine were removed to make room for construction on the park's 2016 launched roller coaster, Taron, and the new themed area Klugheim, which became a part of the Mystery area. Another roller coaster, Raik, is located in the Klugheim area, and is more family-oriented than Taron. The coaster is a Vekoma family boomerang model attraction.

Also in 2016, Race for Atlantis was removed to make way for a new themed area called Rookburgh with a rollercoaster named F.L.Y., the world's first launched flying roller coaster and the longest flying roller coaster in the world.

On November 13, 2026, guests at Phantasialand's Hotel Ling Bao suffered injuries after an automatic chlorine dosing system malfunctioned. This malfunction caused excess chlorine levels to be pumped into pool water, affecting guests. 15 people were checked by paramedics, with 5 suffering injuries as a result. The hotel's monitoring system runs on Microsoft services, including Outlook, and as a result of the 2026 outage it was unable to send an email notifying hotel staff of the excess chlorine levels.

== Theme areas ==
Name	Theme	Dragon	Opening date
Berlin (with Rookburgh)	Historic Berlin with the nostalgic flair of the early 20th century; Boulevard with the Kaiserplatz; Industrial quarter "Rookburgh" in steampunk design	Drago	1970
Mexico	Plaza Mariachi with Mexican buildings; Rockwork of Chiapas; Aztec and Maya cultures	Quetzal	1973
China Town	Traditional Chinese buildings and gardens	Wang	1981
Mystery (with Klugheim)	Medieval village "Klugheim" with Nordic symbolism in a mystical dark atmosphere; Basalt Mountains; gloomy castle complexes	Schneck	1998
Fantasy (with Wuze Town)	Playful, child-friendly fantasy world around the Wuze people in Wuze Town and Baumbergen at the "Mondsee" (moon lake)	Phenie	2002
Deep in Africa	Savannah and rainforest landscape with West African adobe buildings	Kroka	2006

=== Roller coasters ===
Coaster	Picture	Opened	Manufacturer	Area	Description
Black Mamba		2006	Bolliger & Mabillard	Deep in Africa	An inverted roller coaster
Colorado Adventure		1996	Vekoma	Mexico	A mine train
Crazy Bats		1988	Vekoma	Fantasy	An indoor steel roller coaster with an additional virtual reality experience
F.L.Y.		2020	Vekoma	Berlin (Rookburgh)	A launched flying roller coaster
Raik		2016	Vekoma	Mystery (Klugheim)	A steel family boomerang
Taron		2016	Intamin	Mystery (Klugheim)	A multilaunch steel roller coaster
Winja's Fear & Force		2002	Maurer Söhne	Fantasy (Wuze Town)	Duelling spinning roller coasters

=== Water rides ===
Ride	Picture	Opened	Manufacturer	Area	Description
Chiapas		2014	Intamin	Mexico	A log flume
River Quest		2002	Hafema	Mystery	A rapids ride
Wakobato		2009	Preston & Barbieri	Fantasy	A boat ride
Wözl's Wassertreter		2003	Phantasialand	Fantasy	Pedalos

=== Thrill rides ===
Ride	Picture	Opened	Manufacturer	Area	Description
Mystery Castle		1998	Intamin	Mystery	Enclosed drop tower
Talocan		2007	HUSS	Mexico	Suspended top spin
Wellenflug		2011	Zierer	Berlin	Chair swing

=== Dark rides ===
Ride	Picture	Opened	Manufacturer	Area	Theme
Geister Rikscha		1981	Schwarzkopf GmbH (System) Heimo (Theming)	China Town	Chinese mythology
Maus au Chocolat		2011	ETF Ride Systems Alterface	Berlin	Cake factory with a plague of mice

=== Other attractions ===
Ride	Picture	Opened	Manufacturer	Area	Description
Avoras		2024	Kinderland Emsland Spielgeräte	Fantasy	Playground
Bolles Flugschule		2010	Preston & Barbieri	Berlin	Red Baron
Bolles Riesenrad		2010	Preston & Barbieri	Berlin	Ferris wheel
Bumper Klumpen		2003	Preston & Barbieri	Fantasy	Bumper cars
Das verrückte Hotel Tartüff		2012	Hofmann GmbH	Berlin	Funhouse
Deep in Africa - Adventure Trail		2022	Phantasialand	Deep in Africa	Parcours
Der lustige Papagei		2010	Zamperla	Fantasy	Crazy Bus
Die 3 Mausketiere		2025	?	Berlin	4D cinema
Die fröhliche Bienchenjagd		2010	Zamperla	Fantasy	Jump Around
Feng Ju Palace		2002	Vekoma	China Town	Madhouse
Mopti's Monkey Depot		2024	Kinderland Emsland Spielgeräte	Africa	Playground
Pferdekarussell		1998	Preston & Barbieri	Berlin	Merry-go-round
Tikal		2011	Zierer	Mexico	Family drop tower
Tittle Tattle Tree		2002	Vekoma	Fantasy	Para Tower
Wabi's Krabbelinsel		2003	?	Fantasy	Indoor playground
Wavy Battle		2025	?	Fantasy	Water playground
Winni Splash		2025	?	Fantasy	Water playground
Wirtl's Erlebnishöhle		2003	?	Fantasy	Indoor playground
Wirtl's Taubenturm		2007	Heege	Fantasy	Lifting tower
Wolke's Luftpost		2010	Zamperla	Fantasy	Magic Bikes
Wözl's Duck Washer		2003	Preston & Barbieri	Fantasy	Teacups
Wupi's Wabi Wipper		2003	?	Fantasy	Children's drop tower
Würmling Express		2010	Preston & Barbieri	Fantasy	Monorail

=== Removed attractions ===
Due to its particularly small area Phantasialand is known to remove attractions more frequently than other theme parks to gain space for new attractions.

Ride	Picture	Opened	Closed	Manufacturer	Description	Theme
Autoscooter		1968	1986	?	Bumper cars	none
Ballonfahrt		1993	2009	Zamperla	Balloon ride	none
Baumberger Irrgarten		2010	2021	Phantasialand	Maze	Maze
Bienchenflug		1979	2009	?	Carousal with bee-looking gondolas	none
Bolles Spieleland / Penaten Kinderparadies / Ronnies Spieleland		1970s	2010	Phantasialand & Penaten	Playground	none
Bottichfahrt		1971	1993	Phantasialand	Water ride with tub-looking gondolas	none
Bullenreiten		2004	2009	Phantasialand	Mechanic bull	American frontier
Cine 2000		1978	1995	Omnivision	180-degree Cinema	none
Condor		1986	2006	HUSS rides	Condor	none
Djembe Musikschule		2006	2020	Phantasialand	Djembe drums	Africa
Crazy Loop		1995	2004	Fabbri Group	Breakdance	1995-1996: none 1997-2004: Mexico
Galaxis-360		1982	1985	?	360-degree Cinema	none
Galaxy		1994	2005 (re-themed to Race for Atlantis)	Simtec Systems & IMAX Corporation	Simulator ride	Science fiction
Gebirgsbahn		1975	2001 (burned down)	Schwarzkopf GmbH	Speed Racer (Roller coaster)	Mountain range
Gondelbahn 1001 Nacht		1970	2009	Phantasialand	Dark ride	Stories from One Thousand and One Nights
Grand-Canyon-Bahn		1978	2001 (burned down)	Schwarzkopf GmbH	Powered roller coaster	Mountain range
Hollywood Tour		1990	2020	Intamin	Water dark ride	Hollywood movies
Jumbo		1979	2000	?	Aerial carousal ride with elephant-looking gondolas	none
Käpt'n Blackbeards Piratenflotte		2001	2004	Phantasialand	Model ships navigated by water guns	Pirates
Kinder-Riesenrad		1993	2009	Zamperla	Ferris wheel for kids	none
Klettergarten		2009	2012	Phantasialand	Climbing parcourse	none
Märchenwald		1967	2007	Phantasialand	Fairytale Forest	Fairytales
Octowuzy		2003	2023	?	Water playground	Fantasy
Oldtimerbahn		1967	1986	Phantasialand	Vintage car ride	none
Phantasialand Jet		1974	2008	Schwarzkopf GmbH	Monorail	1974-1996: none 1997-2008: Mexico
Pirates 4D		1998	2025	Renaissance Entertainment	4D cinema	Building: Early 20th century Berlin, Film: Pirates
Polyp		1975	1983	Schwarzkopf GmbH	Octopus	none
Ponyreitbahn		1967	1975	Phantasialand	Pony ride	American frontier
Professor Wuzipuh's Clever-Bollen		2003	2016	Phantasialand	Edutainment	Fantasy
Race for Atlantis		2005	2016	Simtec & IMAX Corporation	Simulator ride	Atlantis
Ruderboote		1967	1967	Phantasialand	Rowing boats	none
Schloss Schreckenstein		1972	2008	Phantasialand	Walkthrough	Scary castle
Seeräuberfahrt nach Carthagena		1968	1978 (re-themed to Wikingerbootsfahrt)	Phantasialand	Themed water ride	Pirates
Silbermine		1984	2014	Schwarzkopf GmbH (system) Hofmann (Theming)	Dark Ride	American frontier
Silverado Up 'n' Down / Wamazonen-Flugcenter / Wuzi's Going Up		2004	2015	Phantasialand	Bungee-trampolines	none
Space Center		1988	2001 (re-themed to Temple of the Night Hawk)	Vekoma	Roller Coaster	Space
Spider		1984	1985	Schwarzkopf GmbH	Octopus	none
Stonewash Creek		1974 (together with Wildwash Creek as Wildwasserbahn)	1992: split into two water rides 2011	Mack Rides	Log flume	American frontier
Temple of the Night Hawk		2001	2019 (re-themed to Crazy Bats)	Vekoma	Roller Coaster	Jungle
Tretboote		1967	1968	Phantasialand	Pedal Boats	none
Walzertraum		1993	2009	Mack Rides	Themed water ride	Flowers
Wikingerbootsfahrt		1979	1999	Phantasialand	Themed water ride	Vikings
Wildwash Creek		1974 (together with Stonewash Creek as Wildwasserbahn)	1992: split into two water rides 2011	Mack Rides	Log flume	American frontier
Wosi's Abenteuerpark		2003	2013	?	Indoor playground	none
Yeti		1989	2004	Phantasialand	Animatronic	Yeti

== Performance shows ==
- Silverado Theatre: Battle of the Best – a show featuring basketball and trampoline stunts as well as dance-offs
- Arena de Fiesta: Rock on Ice – Ice skating show with rock music
- Wintergarten: Nobis Vol. 2 – Variety show
- Deep in Africa: Miji African Dancers

Also there is as a chance to meet up with the park's six dragon characters.

A dinner show called Fantissima is also offered on select evenings, for an additional fee. The show runtime is approximately four hours.
