= Colorado Adventure =

Steel roller coaster at Phantasialand

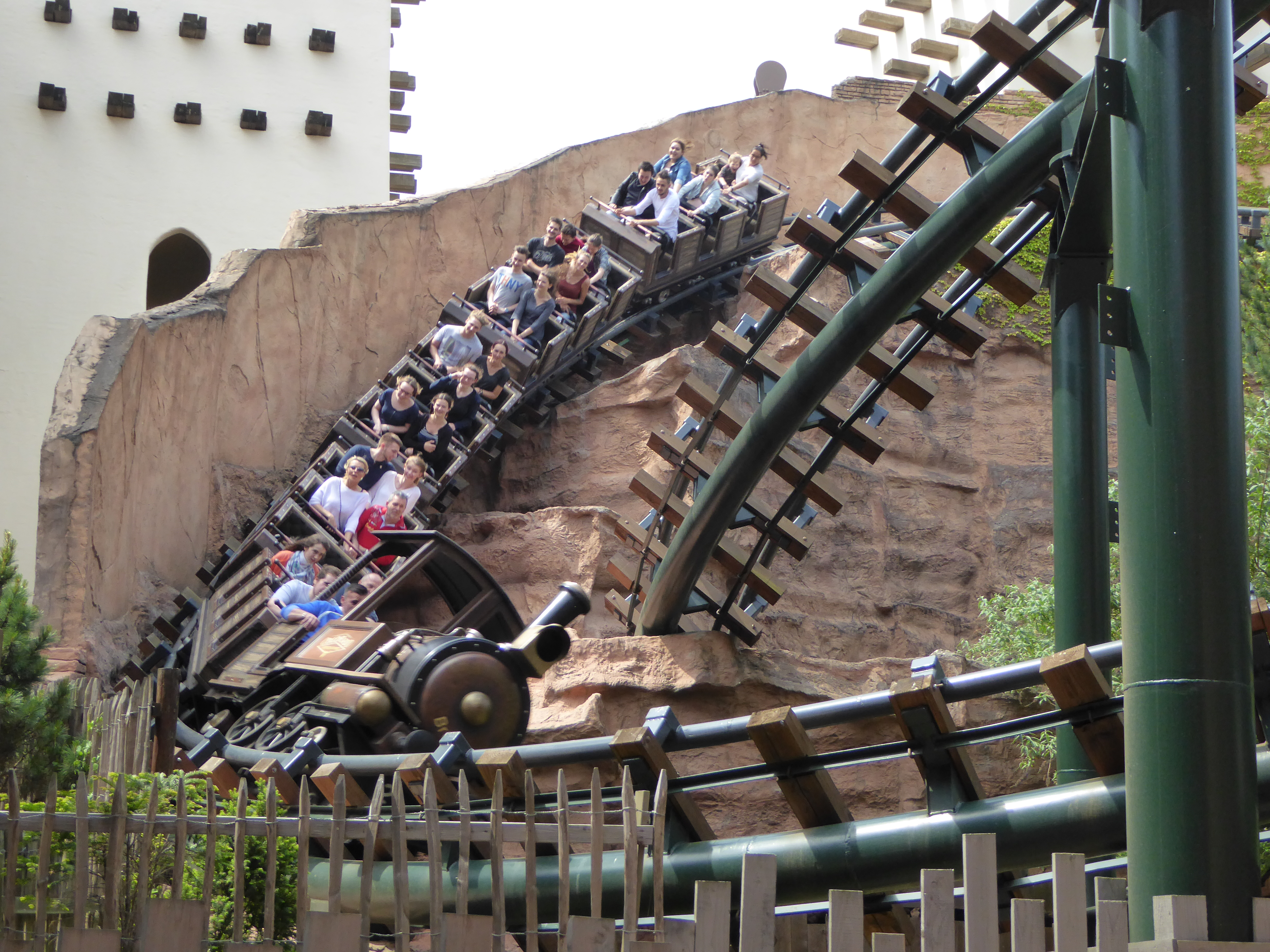

Phantasialand
- Location: Phantasialand
- Park section: Mexico
- Coordinates: 50°47′55.18″N 6°52′53.26″E
- Status: Operating
- Opening date: May 11, 1996
- Replaced: Cine 2000

General statistics
- Type: Steel – Mine Train
- Manufacturer: Vekoma
- Model: Custom MK-900 M
- Height: 85 ft (26 m)
- Length: 4,199 ft (1,280 m)
- Speed: 31.1 mph (50.1 km/h)
- Duration: 2:55
- Capacity: 2,300 riders per hour
- Theme: Wild West
- Trains: 5 (max. 4 in operation) trains with 6 cars; riders arranged 2 across in 3 rows with the exception of the first car which has only a single row for a total of 32 riders per train.
- Colorado Adventure at RCDB

Colorado Adventure is a mine train roller coaster located at Phantasialand in Brühl, North Rhine-Westphalia, Germany. During construction, it was decided to opt for a roller coaster in a Western style rather than a traditional roller coaster. The name Colorado is derived from the U.S. state of the same name, well known during the ‘Wild West’ period in the USA.

Until 2013 its full name was Colorado Adventure – The Michael Jackson Thrill Ride. The ride was open from the beginning of the 1996 season and was ‘officially’ opened by Michael Jackson on May 11.

Designed by Peter Clerx, the Colorado Adventure includes 5 trains with 6 cars per train. Riders are arranged 2 across in 3 rows, with the exception of the first car, which is designed as a steam locomotive and offers two seats in a single row, with a total of 32 riders per train. A maximum of four trains can be used at one time.

== Reception ==
The ride has been voted by fans as one of the world’s best examples of the mine roller coaster. A review in Theme Park Insider said, "I enjoyed it but will admit that it was significantly faster and more intense than it looked."

=== Noise levels ===
Local residents have complained about the amount of noise generated by riders on the Colorado Adventure. The ride has been fitted with extra tunnel sections and also partly covered with noise barriers. In 2011, the Smokey Mountain was replaced by a new child attraction "Tikal".
