= Thunder Run (Canada's Wonderland) =

Roller coaster

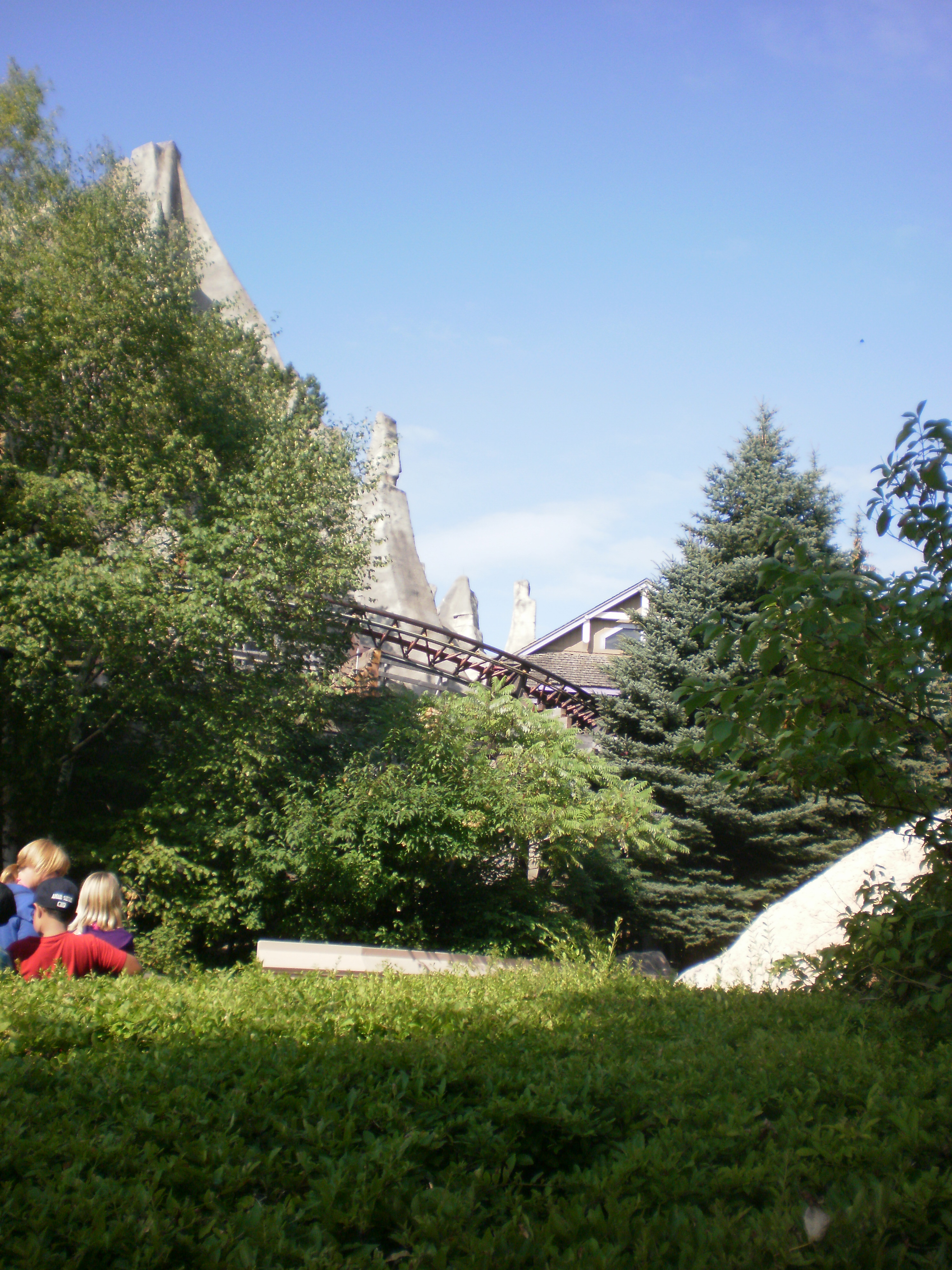

Canada's Wonderland
- Location: Canada's Wonderland
- Park section: Alpenfest
- Coordinates: 43.8427°N 79.5423°W
- Status: Operating
- Opening date: 1986
- Cost: $2.7M est.
- Replaced: Blauer Enzian

General statistics
- Type: Steel – Powered – Mine Train
- Manufacturer: Mack Rides
- Height: 10 m (33 ft)
- Length: 330 m (1,080 ft)
- Speed: 64 km/h (40 mph)
- Inversions: 0
- Duration: 1:24
- Height restriction: 102 cm (3 ft 4 in)
- Trains: Single train with 10 cars; riders arranged 2 across in 2 rows (1 row in the front car) for a total of 38 riders per train
- Thunder Run at RCDB

Thunder Run is a powered roller coaster, themed after a runaway mine train, found at Canada's Wonderland, in Vaughan, Ontario, Canada. Rather than having a traditional chain lift hill, the train has an electric motor on board. The train (consisting of nine cars of two rows of two seats, plus an extra single row at the front of the train) flies directly into the Wonder Mountain, the artificial mountain that is a trademark of the park. Thunder Run wasn't the park's first powered coaster. When Canada's Wonderland opened in 1981, it had a powered coaster named Blauer Enzian ("Blue Gentian" in German). However, in 1985, the coaster shut down and would be relocated to Tykkimäki. After that, Mack Rides, the manufacturer of Blauer Enzian, would be contacted to build another powered coaster for Canada's Wonderland.

The ride occupies the interior of the Wonder Mountain, which was initially supposed to hold a "Bavarian Market". Instead, mechanical equipment was placed inside, which was later relocated to the "roof" of the mountain to make room for the ride. The relocation of mechanical equipment also resulted in the Wonder Mountain walkway being closed. Riders on Vortex can still see remnants of the look-out terrace before they reach the first drop.

== Ride experience ==
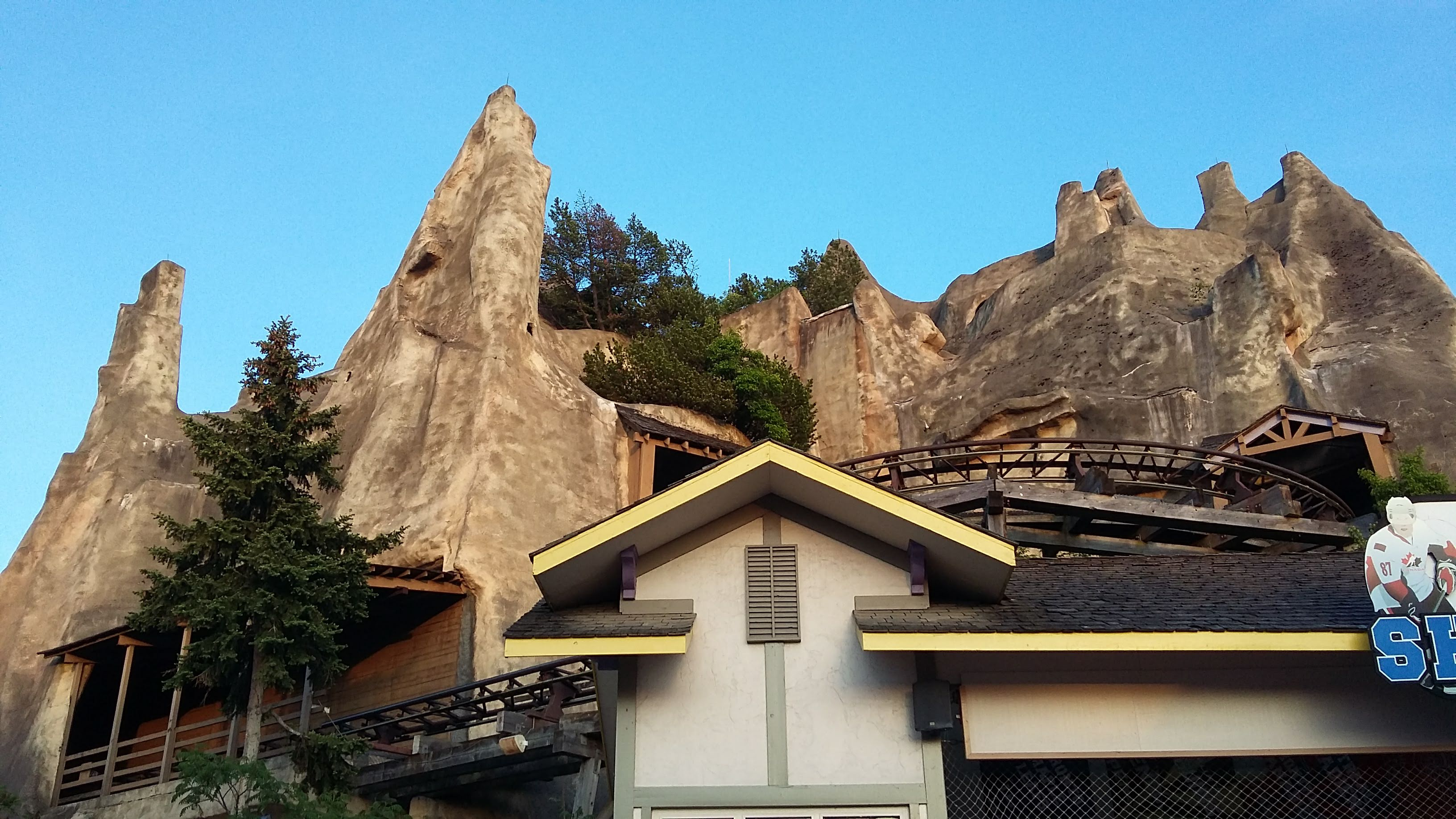
Most of the ride is incorporated into the "Wonder Mountain".

Once the train leaves the station, the riders traverse a banked left turn, followed by an upward helix to the left inside Wonder Mountain. Part of this helix is exposed, giving the riders a view of the surrounding area. Due to the nature of the train ride, the train picks up speed as it ascends the helix. The train then re-enters the mountain, traversing a downward double-helix to the right in complete darkness, with included special effects. The riders enter a decorated light tunnel, followed by a downward banked curve to the left. The train passes through the station, then completes the layout a second time before returning to the train station.

With a height restriction that accommodates children as small as 102 centimetres (40 in) tall, Thunder Run's design is geared towards families. While most of the ride is experienced in the dark, riders also encounter visual effects and props, most notably the Dragon (nicknamed "Herman" by Wonderland employees). Other visual effects include lighted tunnels and strobe lights.

As previously mentioned, the train ride is programmed so that it completes two circuits, maximizing the capability of the train coaster's rather small footprints.

In the past, during the park's Halloween Haunt seasonal event in October, Wonderland has renamed the train ride to Haunted Thunder Run with additional light, sound and fog effects.
