= Mine train roller coaster =

Type of steel roller coaster

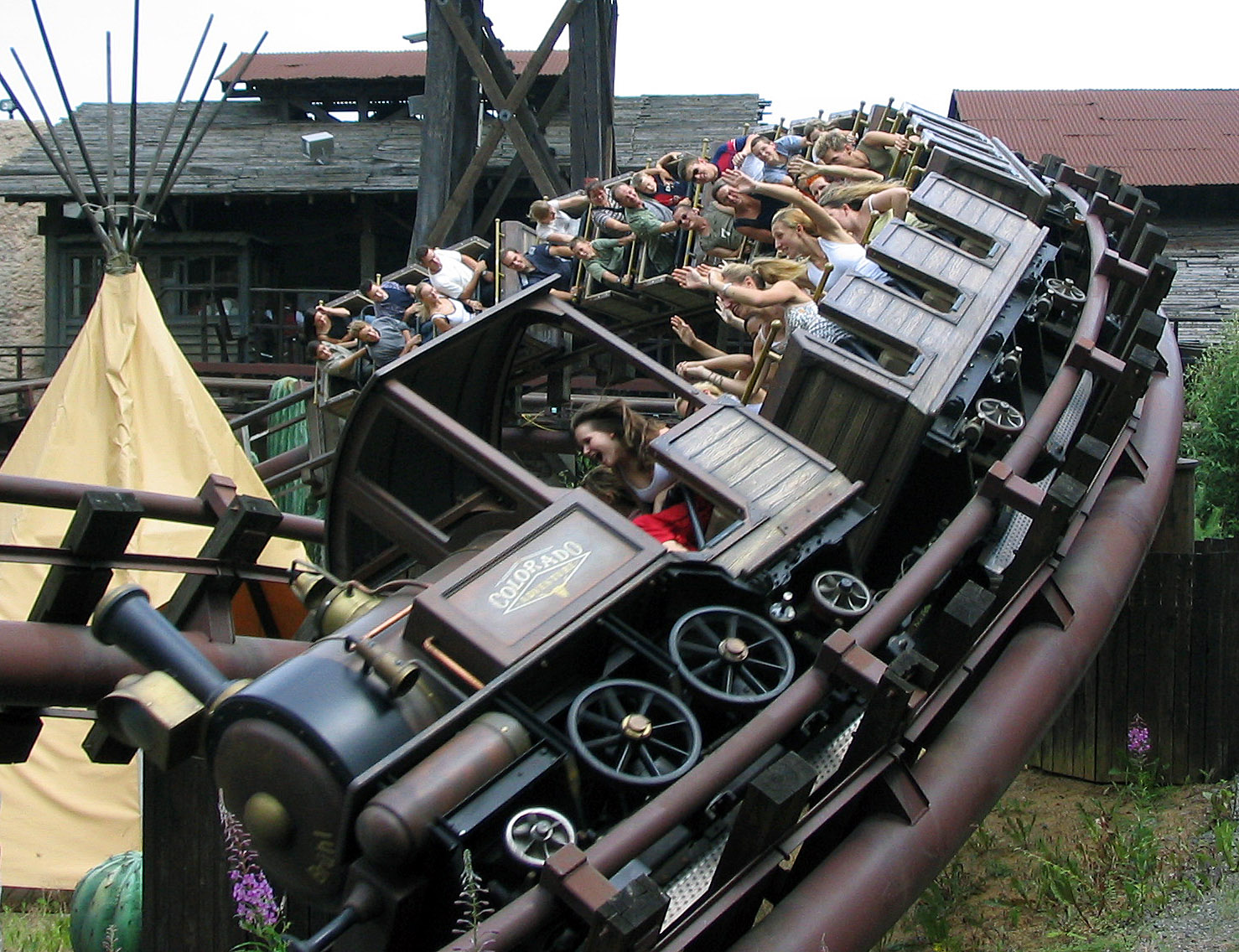
- Colorado Adventure at Phantasialand, a typical mine train roller coaster.
- Status: In Production: Vekoma, Golden Horse, and Intamin Discontinued: Arrow Development, and Arrow Dynamics
- First manufactured: 1966
- Manufacturers: Vekoma, Golden Horse, Intamin, Arrow Development, and Arrow Dynamics

A mine train roller coaster is a steel roller coaster with trains often depicting a set of mine carts, with the forward-most car or portions of it sometimes resembling a small steam locomotive. Most mine train roller coasters are themed in the style of a mine, a Western scene, or simply a mountain range.

Traditional mine train roller coaster track elements include banked turns and helices. There are sometimes level straightaway sections, but few large drops. Most include more than one lift hill. Often, a mine train roller coaster will make its way through trees, tunnels, rock formations, and over small bodies of water. Some feature scenes with animatronic figures.

The first mine train roller coaster of its kind was Runaway Mine Train (Run-A-Way Mine Train until 1995) at Six Flags Over Texas. Built by Arrow Development in 1966, Mine Train is the oldest roller coaster in the park. With Matterhorn Bobsleds at Disneyland (built in 1959 also by Arrow), it is one of the first roller coasters with tubular steel tracks.

Other notable mine train roller coasters are Colorado Adventure in Phantasialand, the Big Thunder Mountain Railroad in various Disney parks, Thunder Run in Canada's Wonderland, Cedar Creek Mine Ride at Cedar Point, Adventure Express at Kings Island, and Thunderation in Silver Dollar City near Branson, Missouri.

== Manufacturers ==
Manufacturer	Model	Number	Production
Arrow Dynamics	Mini Mine Train	4	1967–1969
Arrow Dynamics	Mine Train	16	1966–1997
Beijing Chen Jinying Amusement Equipment	Mine Car	1	2016
Beijing Jiuhua Amusement Rides	Mine Coaster	2	2013–2014
Beijing Shibaolai Amusement Equipment	Mine Coaster	6	1999–present
Intamin	Family Coaster Ulven	3	1997–present
Jinma Rides	Mine Coaster	37	2008–present
S&S Worldwide	Mine Train Coaster	1	2013–present
Technical Park	Gold Mine Coaster	2	2020–present
Vekoma	Mine Train	15	1992–present
Vekoma	Seven Dwarfs Mine Train	2	2014–present
