= Maus au Chocolat =

Amusement ride in Phantasialand, Germany

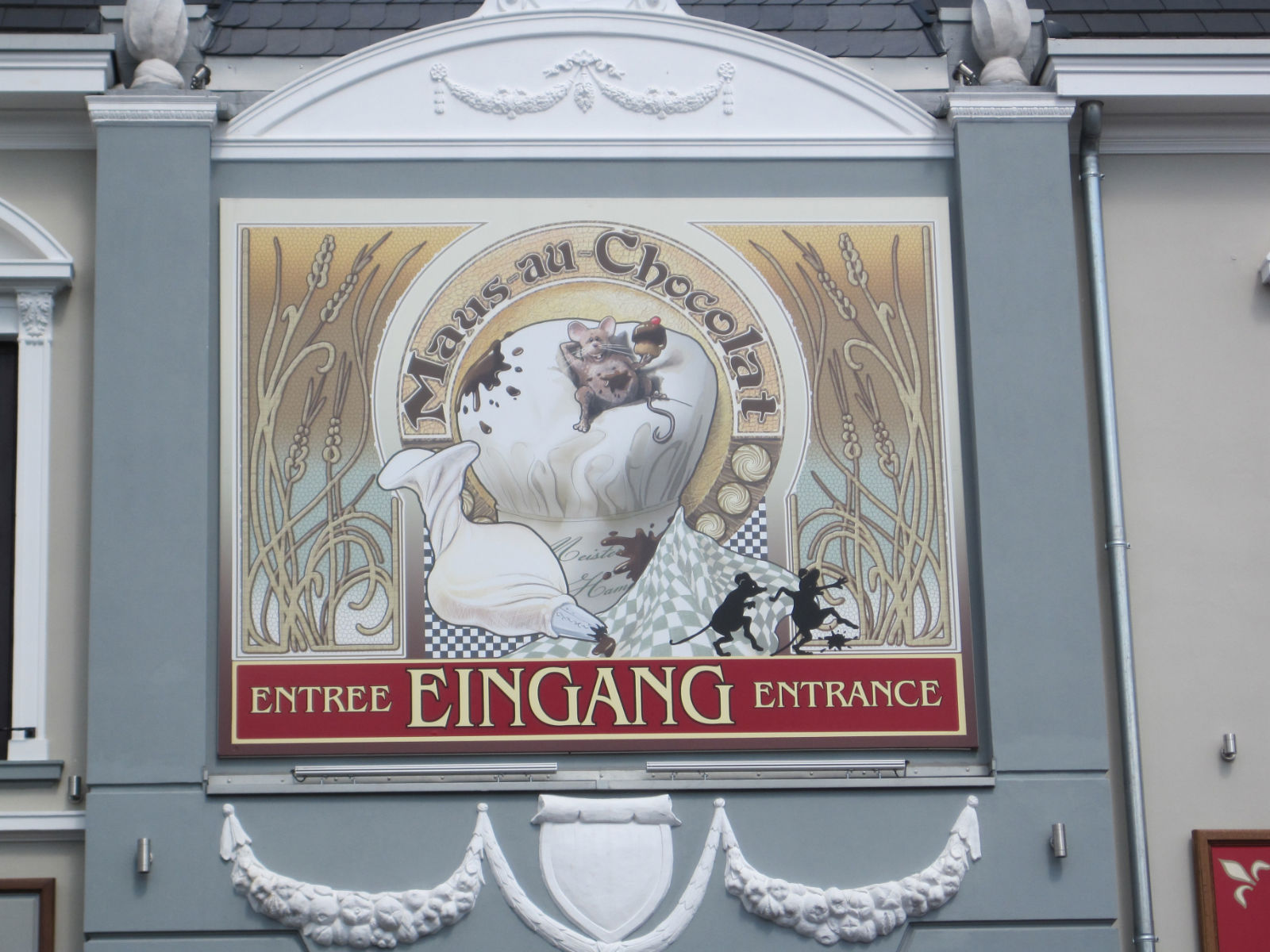
- Ride entrance

Phantasialand
- Area: Berlin
- Coordinates: 50°47′59″N 6°52′49″E
- Opening date: 9 June 2011

Ride statistics
- Attraction type: Interactive dark ride
- Designer: Eric Daman
- Theme: Cake Factory / Early 20th Century Berlin
- Length: 159 m (522 ft)
- Capacity: 970 riders per hour
- Vehicles: 27
- Riders per vehicle: 4
- Duration: 6
- Height restriction: 90 cm (2 ft 11 in)

Maus au Chocolat is an interactive dark ride that opened 9 June 2011 in Phantasialand, Germany. The ride is situated in the Berlin area of the park.

== Story ==
It is Berlin in the 1920's. The kitchens of master pâtissier Gustav E. Lehmann are infested with mice. In order to get rid of them he calls Oskar Koslowski, a pest controller who uses rather unconventional methods to avoid the use of toxic substances that could ruin Lehmann's cakes. Koslowski arms himself with pastry bags to fight the rodents with shots of cream and chocolate. There are too many mice for Koslowski to handle on his own so guests are called in as reinforcements to get rid of the mice.

== Design and Operation ==
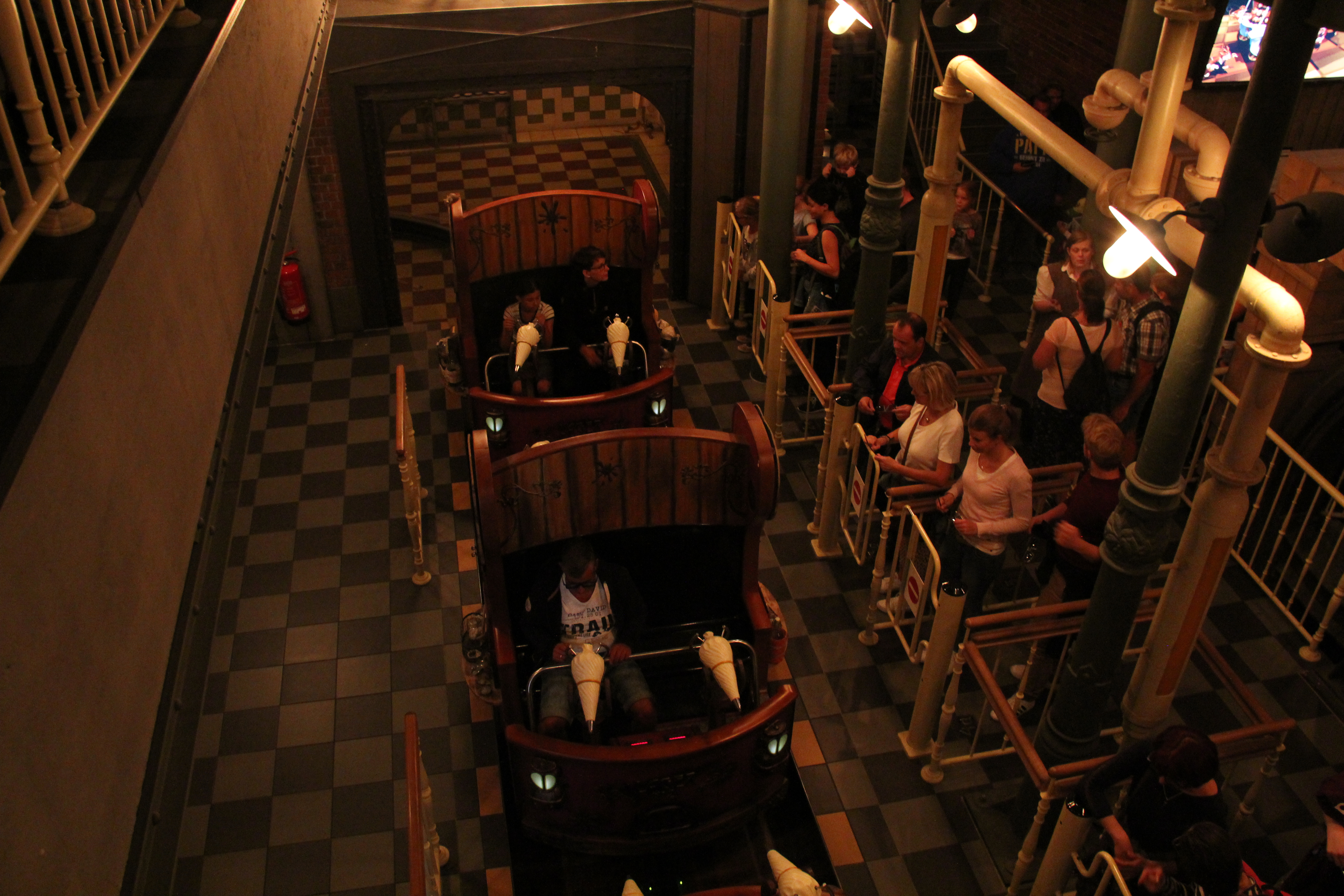
Loading station of the ride

Maus au Chocolat was inspired by Toy Story Midway Mania and was designed for Phantasialand by Eric Daman in collaboration with ETF Ride Systems, 3DBA and Alterface. The ride immerses guests behind the scenes of a large pâtisserie infested with mice. The ride was part of the reorganisation of the central area of the park and was built in a new building bordering Wuze Town.

The entrance of the ride is through the storerooms of the pâtisserie. As guests make their way through the queue-line they find that all the food has been locked away and discover the presence of the pâtisserie's little intruders.

On the loading platform, a pair of 3D glasses is given to each guest before boarding their vehicle. The vehicles leave in groups of three and each can contain four guests (two on each side). Each guest has a pastry bag in front of them to shoot virtual chocolate at the mice that appear on seven screens throughout the ride, with the ride vehicles briefly stopping at each. An on-ride photo is taken part way through. Guests gain points for each mouse they hit. In the last scene the scores and winner for each ride are announced shown alongside the photos taken earlier, and these can be purchased from a van outside the ride.

The exit is through a tea room that opened the same year as the ride.

The name of the ride is a play on words between Maus (German for mouse) and Mousse au chocolat.
