= Taron (roller coaster) =

Steel roller coaster at Phantasialand in Brühl

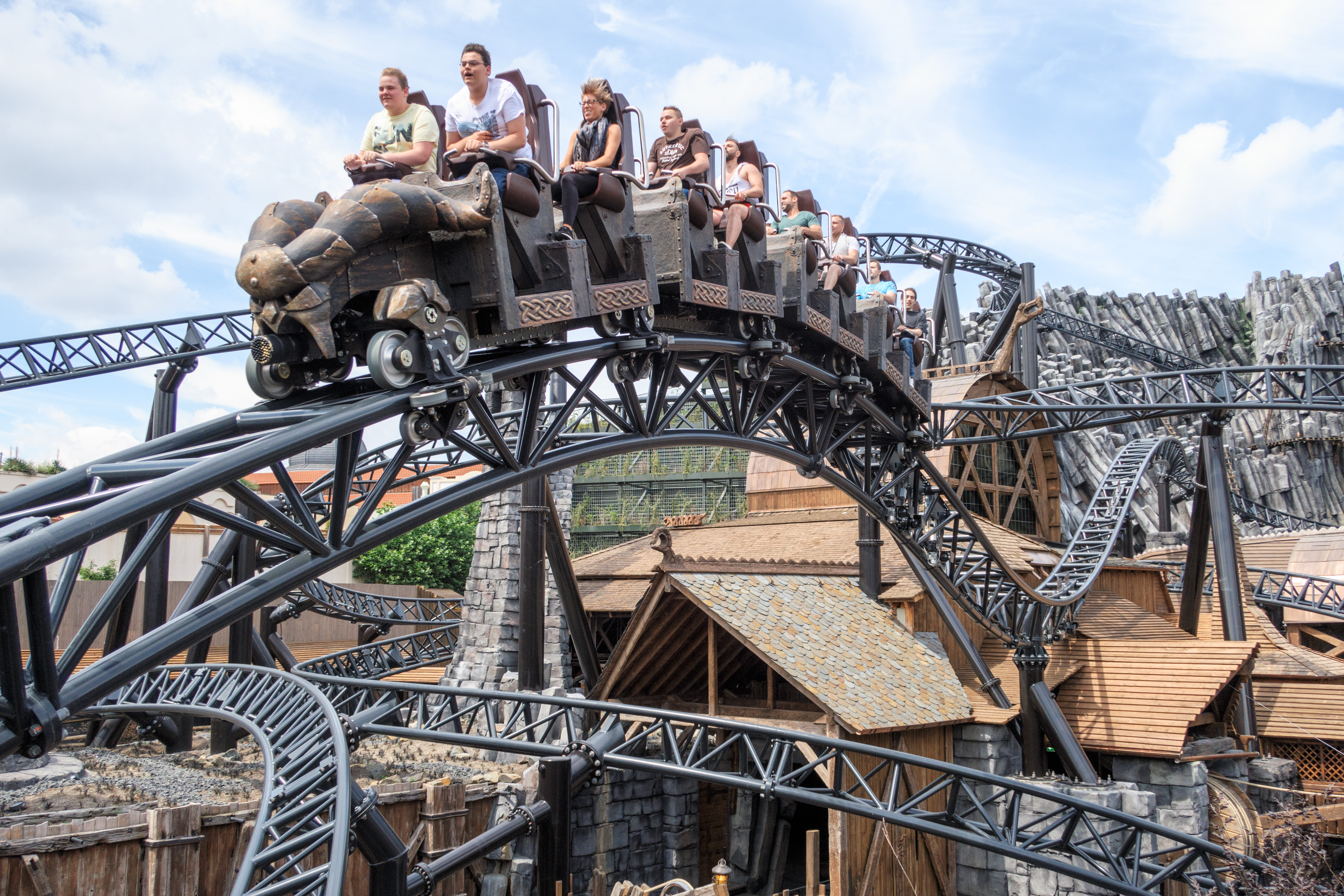

Phantasialand
- Location: Phantasialand
- Park section: Mystery - Klugheim
- Coordinates: 50.79962°N 6.88281°E
- Status: Operating
- Soft opening date: 29 June 2016
- Opening date: 30 June 2016
- Cost: €25 million
- Replaced: Silver City

General statistics
- Type: Steel – Launched
- Manufacturer: Intamin
- Model: LSM Blitz Coaster
- Lift/launch system: LSM
- Height: 30.0 m (98.4 ft)
- Length: 1,320 m (4,330 ft)
- Speed: 117 km/h (73 mph)
- Inversions: 0
- Duration: 1:40
- Capacity: 1,200 riders per hour
- Restraint style: Lap bar
- Height restriction: 130 cm (4 ft 3 in)
- Trains: 4 trains with 4 cars; riders arranged 2 across in 2 rows for a total of 16 riders per train
- Website: https://www.phantasialand.de/en/theme-park/one-of-a-kind-attractions/taron/
- Taron at RCDB

Taron is a multilaunch steel roller coaster manufactured by Intamin located at Phantasialand in Germany. It was the fastest multi-launched roller coaster in the world when it opened on 30 June 2016.

The ride is situated in the 'Klugheim' area of the theme park, a mythical village reflecting Old Norse cultures. The coaster sits in a canyon of basalt rock at the edge of the village. Also within the canyon is a new-for-2016 Family Boomerang roller coaster called Raik. Klugheim replaced the former Silver City themed area of the park.

== Ride experience ==
Upon departure from the station, the train makes a slow U-turn followed by a slight left turn onto the launch track. Once clear, the train is launched to a speed of 80km/h (49.7 mph). The layout is woven between the surrounding buildings and structures of Klugheim, and through tunnels. The riders aboard the train narrowly miss walls of faux rock faces and waterfalls. During the course of the ride, the train crosses over or under its own track 116 times at 58 intersecting track points, more than any other launched roller coaster in the world. The second launch section is in the lowest point in the canyon and it is taken without pause, accelerating the train to its top speed of 117 km/h (72.7 mph).

== World records ==
When opened on June 30, 2016, Taron held records for:

- Fastest multi-launch coaster, currently held by Falcons Flight at Six Flags Qiddiya
- Most intersecting track points on a coaster (58)

== Reception ==
Golden Ticket Awards: Top steel Roller Coasters
| Year | | | | | | | | | 1998 | 1999 |
|---|---|---|---|---|---|---|---|---|---|---|
| Ranking | | | | | | | | | – | – |
| Year | 2000 | 2001 | 2002 | 2003 | 2004 | 2005 | 2006 | 2007 | 2008 | 2009 |
| Ranking | – | – | – | – | – | – | – | – | – | – |
| Year | 2010 | 2011 | 2012 | 2013 | 2014 | 2015 | 2016 | 2017 | 2018 | 2019 |
| Ranking | – | – | – | – | – | – | 32 (tie) | 21 | 15 | 17 |
| Year | 2020 | 2021 | 2022 | 2023 | 2024 | 2025 | 2026 | | | |
| Ranking | N/A | 10 | 12 | 8 | 6 | 8 | 8 | | | |

== Gallery ==
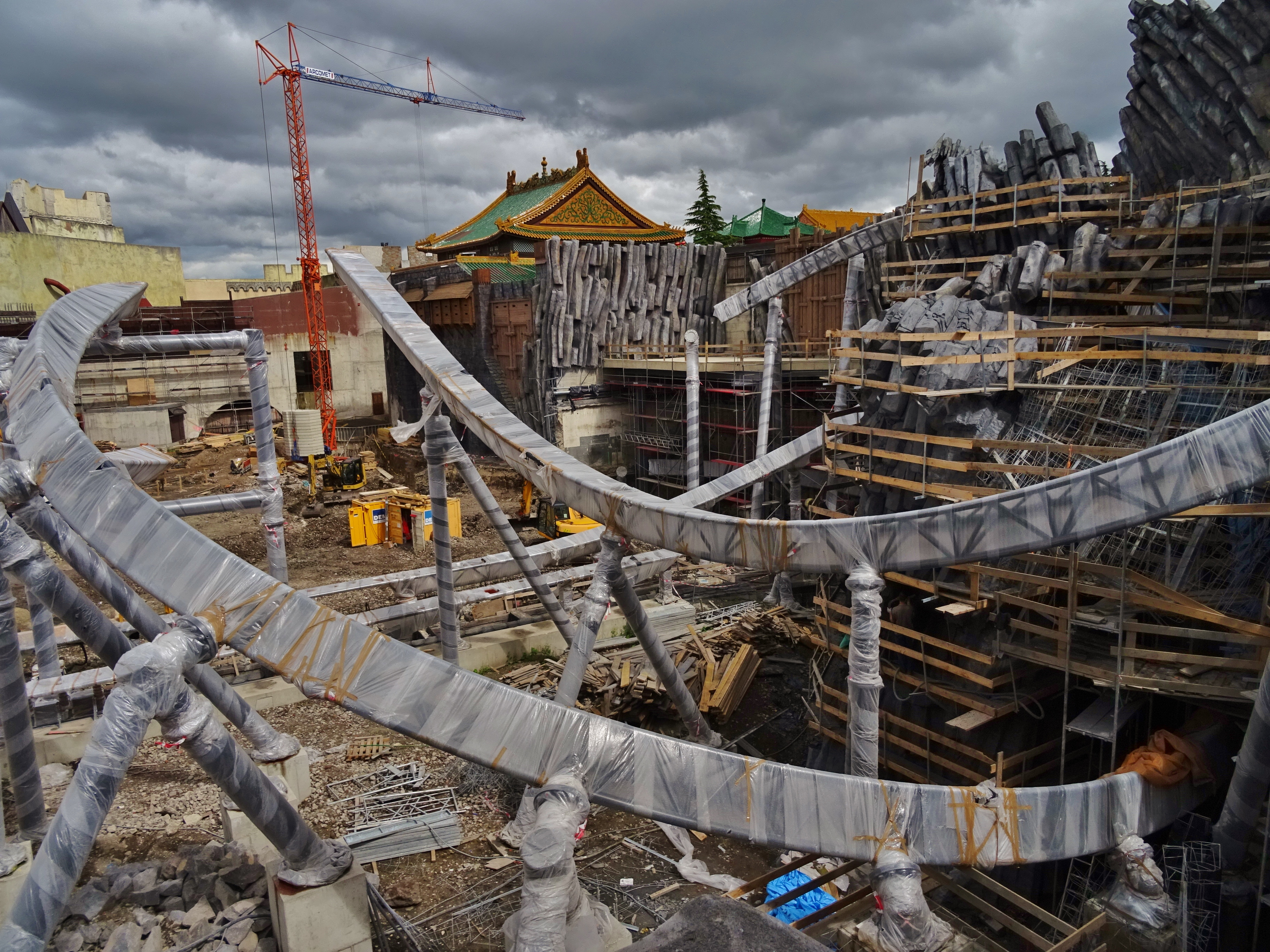
Construction, July 2015

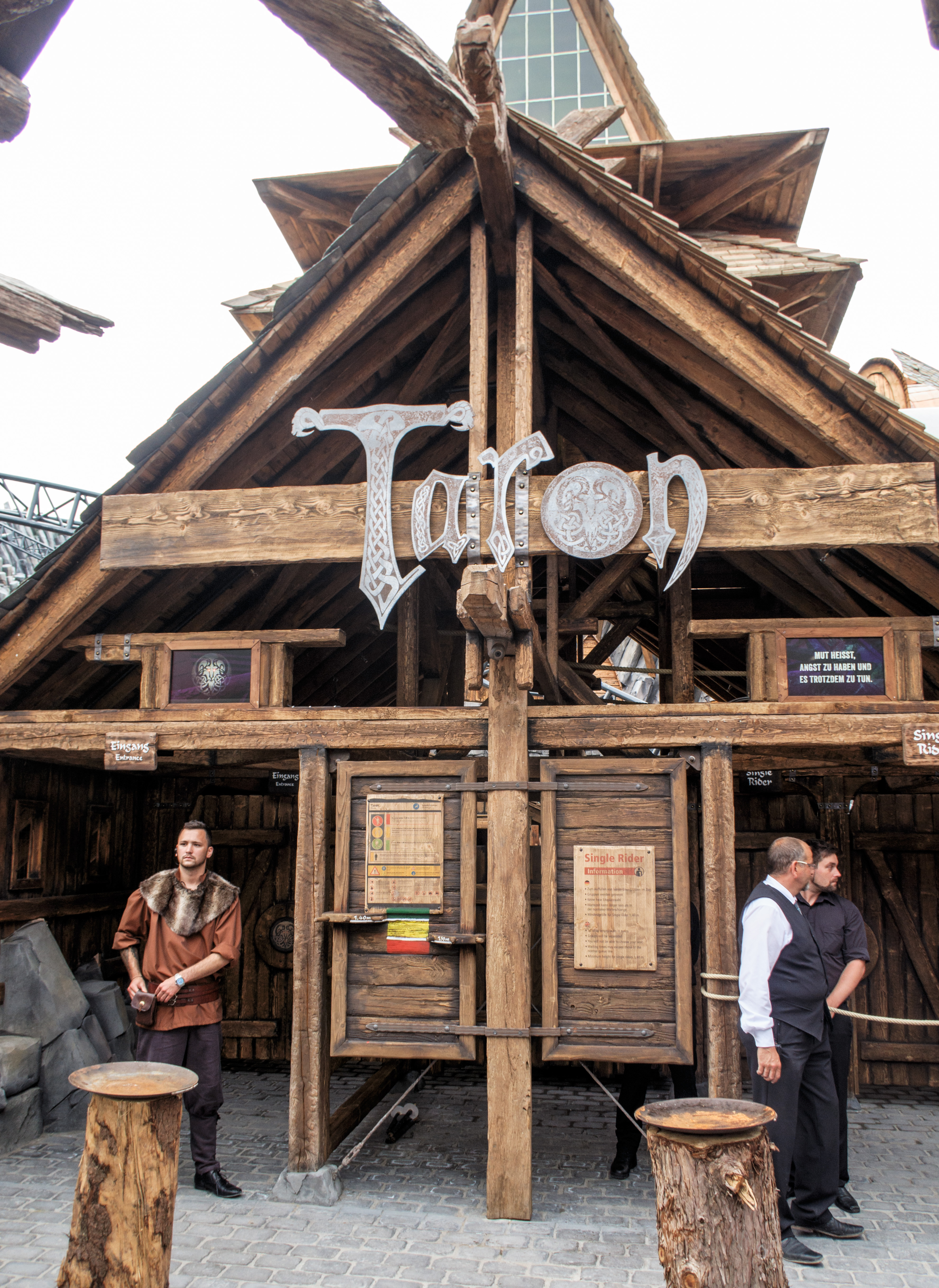
Entrance to roller coaster

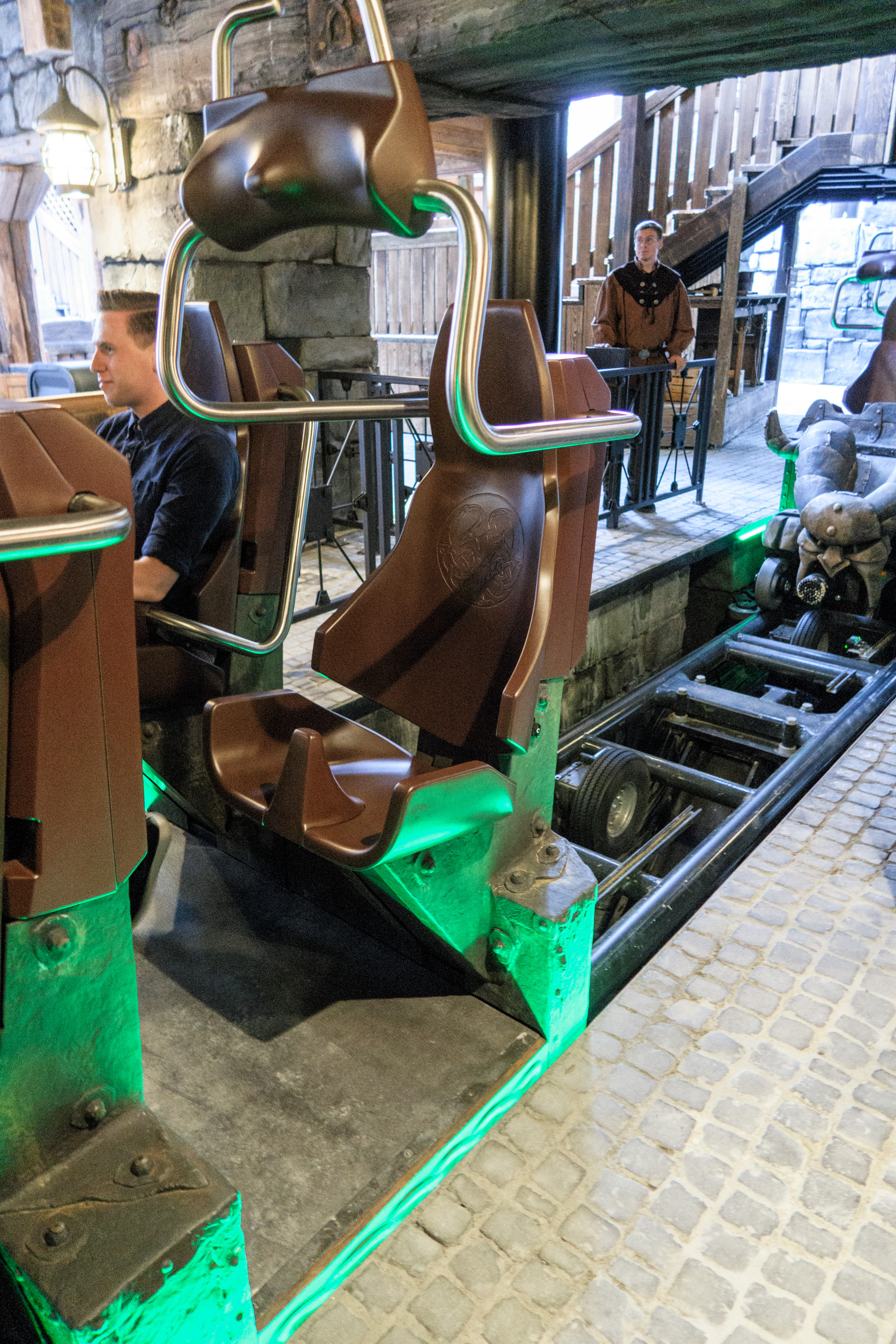
Passenger seat

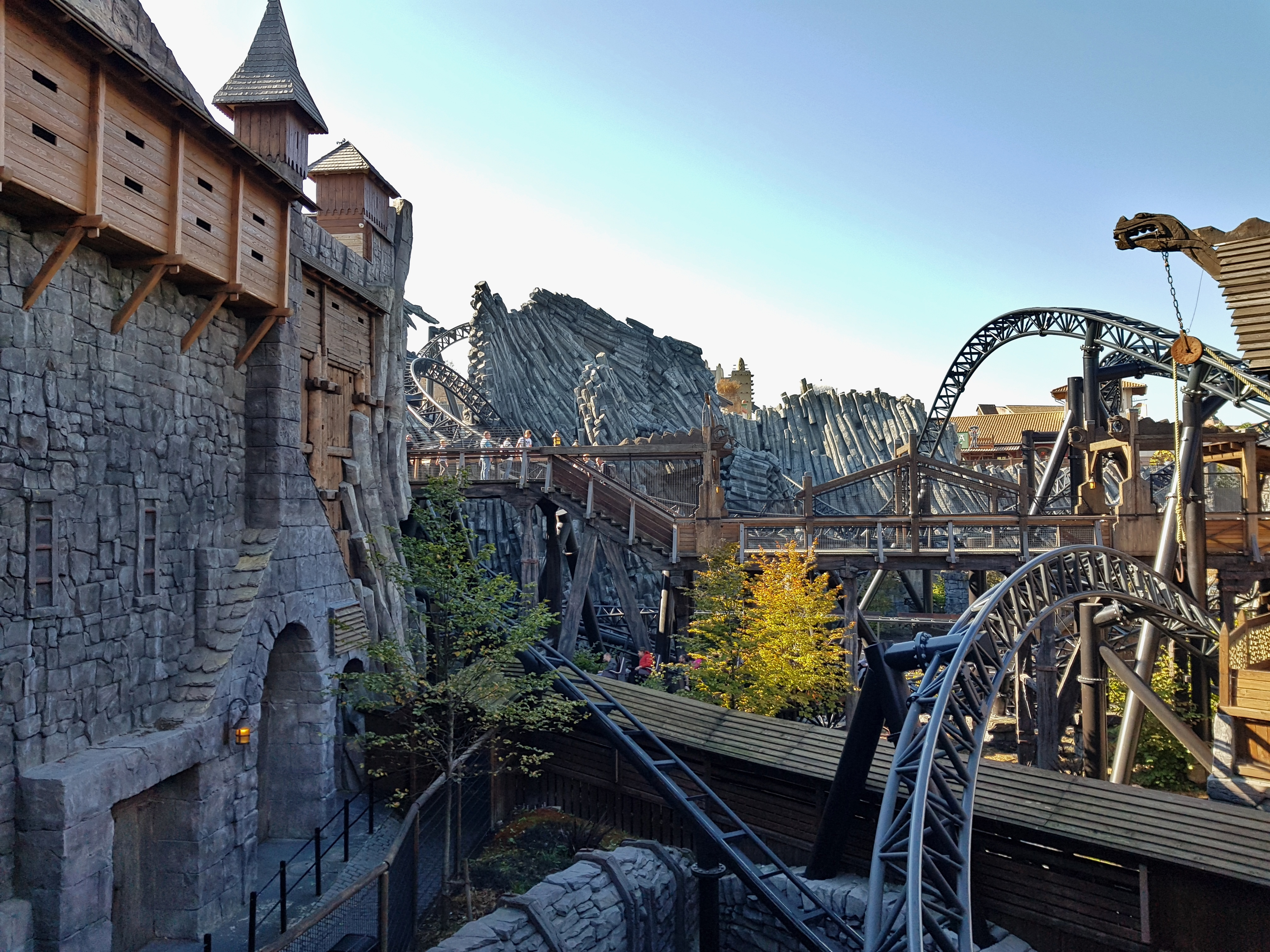
Part of the trails

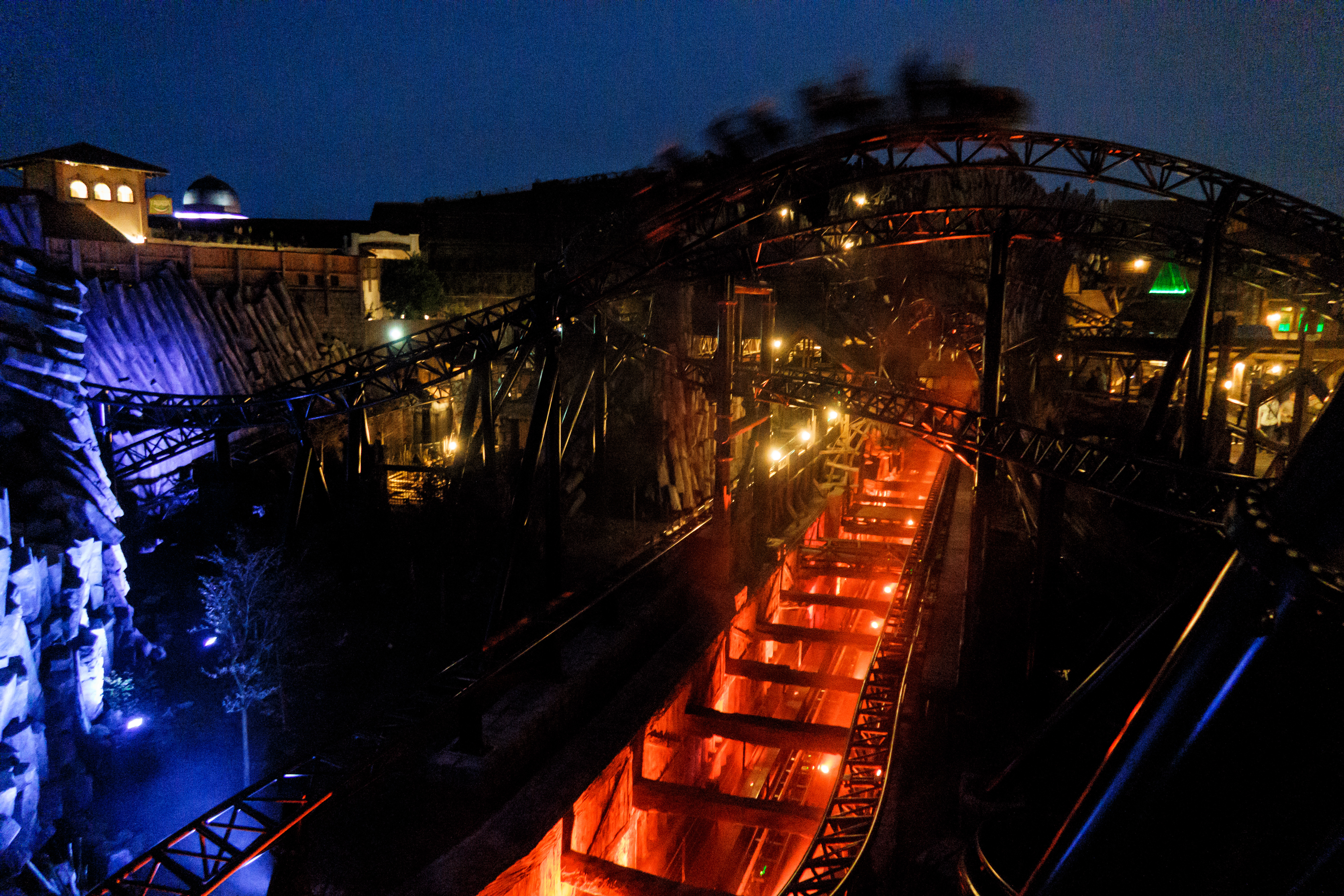
View over Klugheim at night
