= Black Mamba (roller coaster) =

Inverted roller coaster in Germany

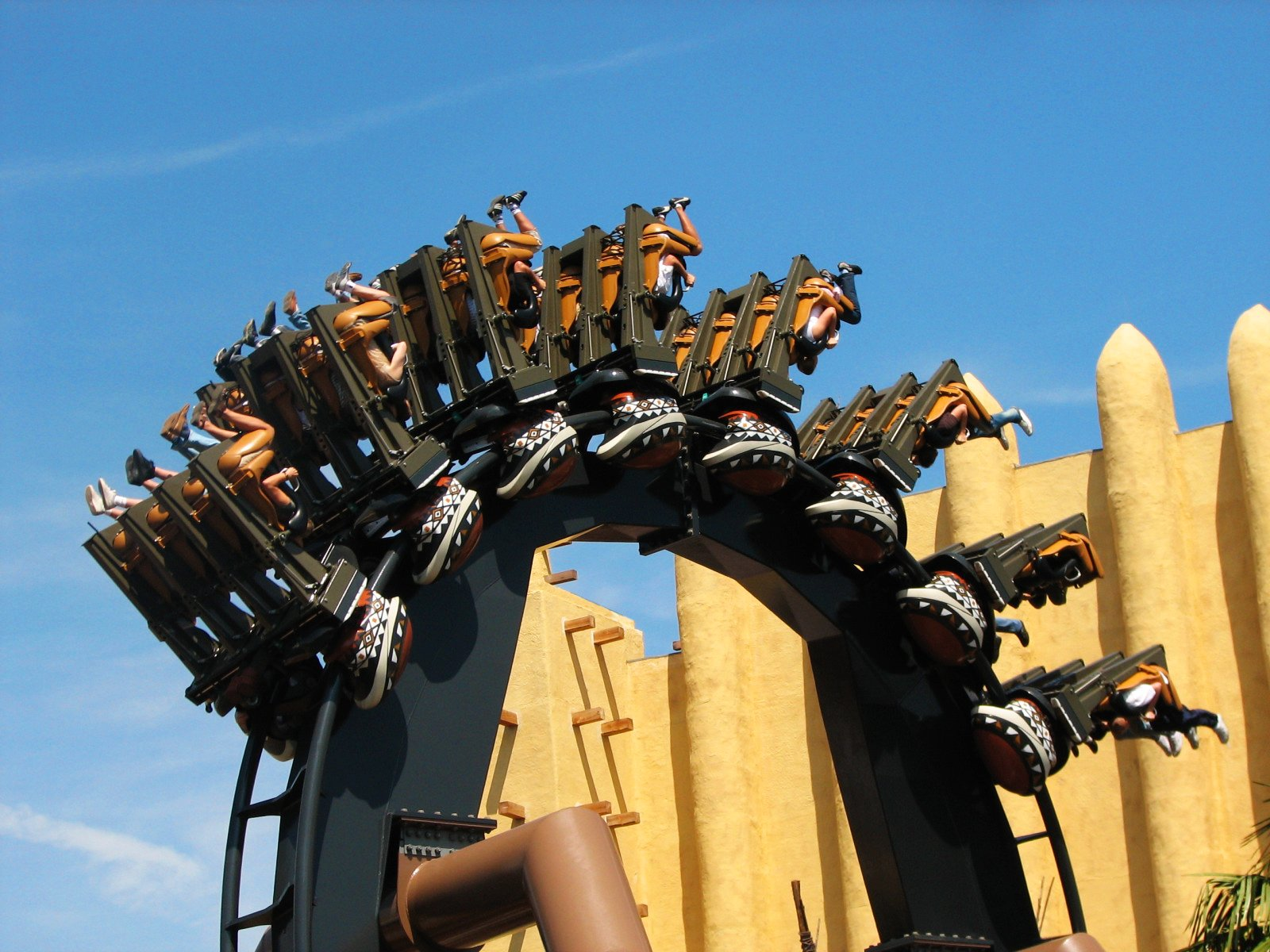

Phantasialand
- Location: Phantasialand
- Park section: Deep in Africa
- Coordinates: 50°47′55″N 6°52′49″E
- Status: Operating
- Opening date: May 24, 2006

General statistics
- Type: Steel – Inverted
- Manufacturer: Bolliger & Mabillard
- Model: Inverted Coaster
- Lift/launch system: Chain lift
- Height: 85.3 ft (26.0 m)
- Drop: 88.6 ft (27.0 m)
- Length: 2,519 ft (768 m)
- Speed: 49.7 mph (80.0 km/h)
- Inversions: 4
- Capacity: 1500 riders per hour
- G-force: 4G
- Height restriction: 55 in (140 cm)
- Trains: 2 trains with 8 cars. Riders are arranged 4 across in a single row for a total of 32 riders per train.
- Theme: Sub-Saharan Africa
- Black Mamba at RCDB

Black Mamba is an inverted roller coaster designed by the Swiss manufacturer Bolliger & Mabillard, located at Phantasialand in Brühl, Germany, opening in 2006.

The ride is named after the venomous black mamba snake, a theme that is reflected in the coaster's fluid, high-speed manoeuvres and its dark-colored track. The surrounding environment is notable for its extensive immersion, utilizing authentic West African mud architecture inspired by the traditional earthen structures of Timbuktu and Djenné. This intricate level of detail extends to the subterranean queue lines and the lush vegetation, creating a seamless transition between the attraction and its cultural narrative.

== Description ==
Black Mamba's track is composed of 70 individual steel sections manufactured with a precision tolerance of 0.15mm to ensure seamless transitions and a smooth ride experience. During the assembly phase, construction proceeded simultaneously from four different points of the circuit until the segments were eventually connected to complete the layout.

To minimize the acoustic impact on the surrounding theme park environment, the hollow interiors of the track rails were filled with sand, a technique designed to dampen the vibrations and noise generated by the passing trains.

== Ride experience ==
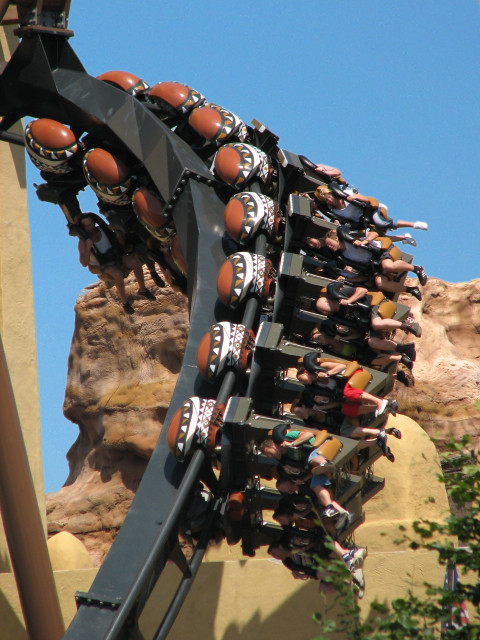
Black Mamba's first drop.

During the ride, forces are created of up to 4.0G. Throughout the ride, passengers encounter "near miss" points where the track is engineered to pass in extremely close proximity to the surrounding rock-work, waterfalls, and architectural structures. These elements are strategically designed to create a sensory illusion of an impending collision, heightening the perceived speed and intensity of the experience.

Black Mamba features a helix with the smallest radius ever built on a B&M roller coaster.

The ride operates with two trains, each consisting of eight cars. Every car is configured with a single row of four seats, allowing for a maximum occupancy of 32 passengers per train. To ensure rider safety, the seats are equipped with over-the-shoulder harnesses.

== Opening ==
On May 24 2006, Phantasialand hosted a one-day pre-opening event for Black Mamba, inviting a select group of guests and officials to experience the attraction ahead of its public debut. The event served a philanthropic purpose, with all proceeds dedicated to the construction of a school in Malawi as part of the RTL Spendenmarathon charity campaign.

== Reception ==
Golden Ticket Awards: Top steel Roller Coasters
Year									1998	1999
Ranking									–	–
Year	2000	2001	2002	2003	2004	2005	2006	2007	2008	2009
Ranking	–	–	–	–	–	–	–	–	–	–
Year	2010	2011	2012	2013	2014	2015	2016	2017	2018	2019
Ranking	–	–	–	–	–	29	25	35	34	43
Year	2020	2021	2022	2023	2024	2025				
Ranking	N/A	42 (tied)	44	50	44	–				
