= Symbolica =

Dark ride in the Efteling theme park

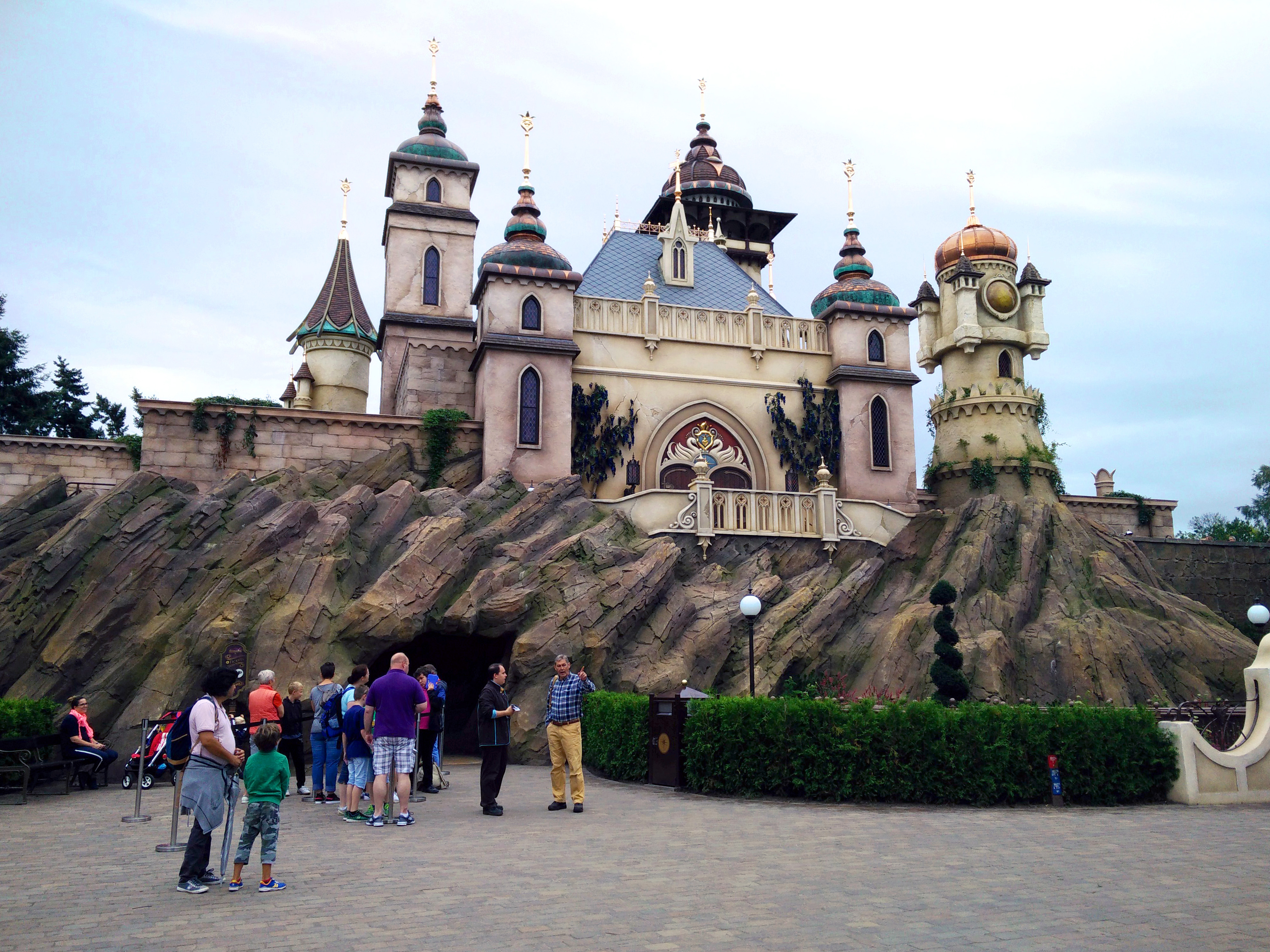
- Symbolica in August 2017

Efteling
- Status: Operating
- Cost: € 35,000,000
- Opening date: July 1, 2017

Ride statistics
- Attraction type: Trackless darkride
- Manufacturer: ETF Ride Systems
- Capacity: 1400 riders per hour
- Vehicles: Fantasievaarders (fantasy floats)
- Riders per vehicle: 6
- Rows: 2
- Riders per row: 3
- Duration: 7 minutes
- Single rider line available

Symbolica is a trackless dark ride at Efteling theme park in the Netherlands, which opened July 1, 2017.

Construction began on January 11, 2016. At a cost of €35 million, it is tied with Danse Macabre for the most expensive project at Efteling.

== History ==
Originally, an attraction called Hartenhof would be constructed on the site of Symbolica. The project was postponed multiple times, until it was renamed Symbolica. Construction started January 11, 2016.

== Story ==
The story of Symbolica is all about visiting king Pardulfus, who lives in Hartenhof (court of hearts). While the visitors await their audience with the king, a character called Pardoes (a Jester who is Efteling's main mascot) appears. Pardoes then guides the visitors through hidden parts of the palace.

== Ride experience ==
Before the visitors can enter their Fantasievaarders (Fantasy floats), there is a pre-show with two animatronics. A staircase magically opens and the visitors are directed to the boarding station. Here, they can choose one of three different routes: Heldentour (Hero tour), Muziektour (Music tour) and Schattentour (Treasure tour). The castle consists of eleven scenes, where each of the three routes attends nine scenes. Below are the eleven scenes:

- Observatorium (observatory), the workplace of a wizard called Almar. Almar is present in the form of an animatronic. This room is arranged like a library.
- Panorama Salon (panorama lounge), a miniature city that's similar to Diorama.
- Botanicum, decorated as being a botanical garden, riders can see a whale in an aquarium, while the glass of said aquarium can be seen cracking. Riders are then quickly escorted out of the Botanicum.
- Schatten Boudoir (treasure boudoir), a part of the Schattentour, riders can use the interactive display in front of them to make a big diamond in the middle glow different colors.
- Helden Kabinet (heroes cabinet), a part of the Heldentour, riders can use the interactive display in front of them to make the heroes fight each other.
- Muziek Salon (music lounge), a part of the Muziektour, riders can use the interactive display in front of them to make different musical sounds.
- Verborgen Fantasie Depot (hidden fantasy depot)
- Koninklijke Champagne Voorraad (royal champagne stocks), champagne bottles can be seen popping all around the rider.
- Provisie Passage (provision passage), riders bump into Polle, a mascot from the pancake house diagonal to symbolica, holding a trolley with large piles of pancakes on it.
- Koningszaal (royal hall), a royal party is going on in this area. The vehicles go around the hall, whilst different couples are dancing.
- Galerij der Fantasievollen (gallery of imaginers), up on the walls of this scene are moving paintings of those living in the Hartenhof castle, including the riders.

The ride time is approximately seven minutes.
