= Chiapas (Phantasialand) =

Flume ride at Phantasialand in Germany

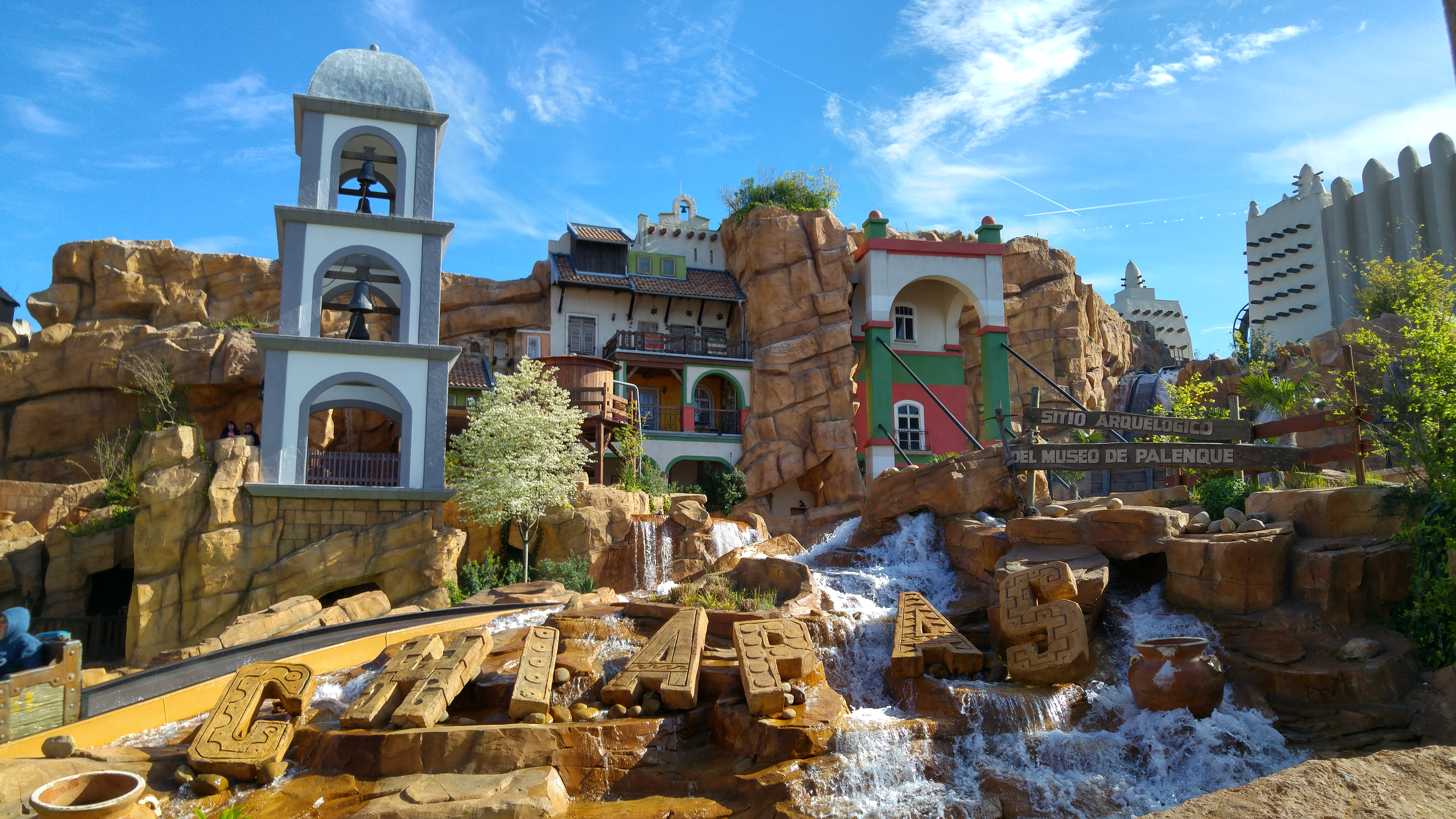

Phantasialand
- Area: Mexico
- Status: Operating
- Opening date: 1 April 2014
- Replaced: Stonewash and Wildwash Creek

General statistics
- Type: Log flume
- Manufacturer: Intamin
- Height: 15 m (49 ft)
- Drop: 20 m (66 ft)
- Length: 620 m (2,030 ft)
- Speed: 47 mph (76 km/h)
- Max vertical angle: 53°
- Capacity: 1740 riders per hour
- Duration: 6 minutes
- Boats: 29 boats. Riders are arranged 1 across in 6 rows for a total of 6 riders per boat.
- Height restriction: 120 cm (3 ft 11 in)
- Number of drops: 3

Chiapas, DIE Wasserbahn is an Intamin flume ride in Phantasialand, a theme park in Germany, which opened on 1 April 2014. It is located in the park's Mexico area and replaced Stonewash and Wildwash Creek, which were both demolished in 2011. Its 53° drop is the steepest drop on a log flume in the world.

The soundtrack for Chiapas was composed by Andreas and Sebastian Kübler of IMAscore and features the 65-person Budapest Film Music Orchestra.

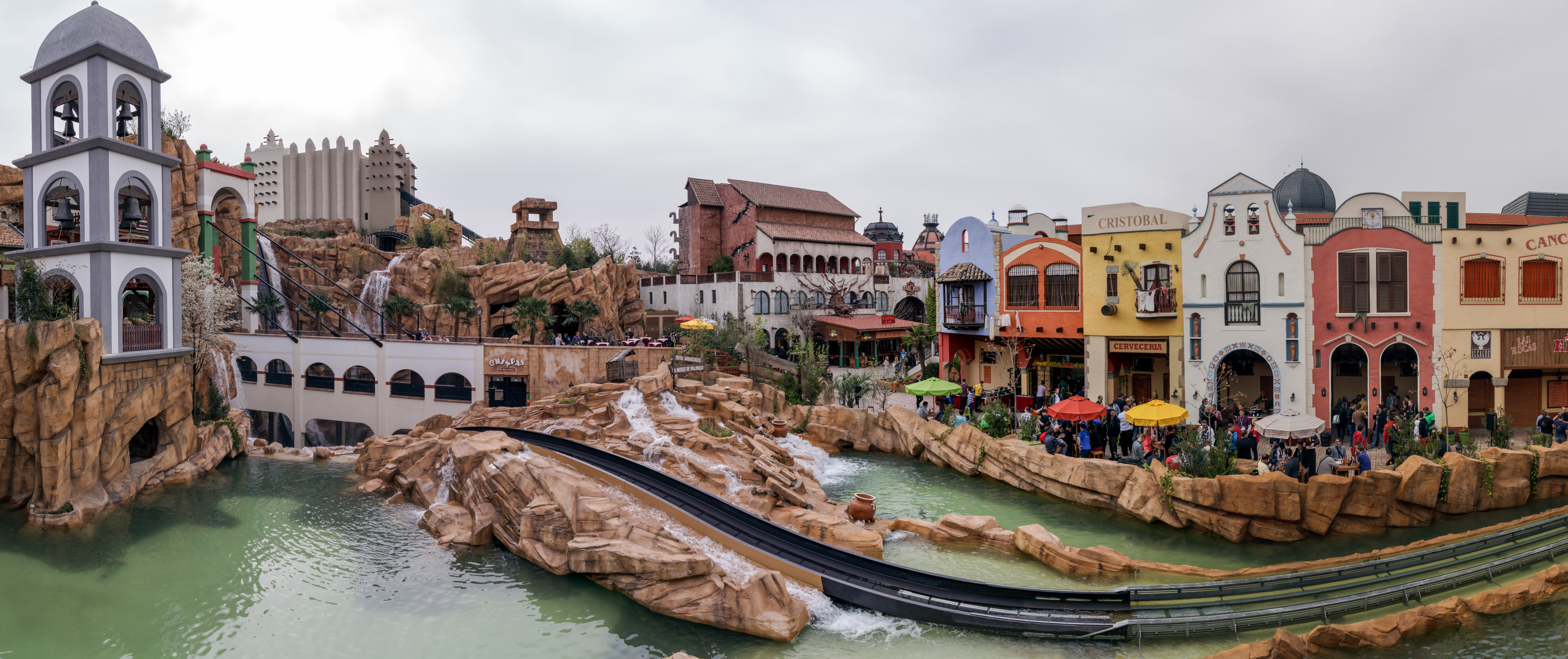
Panorama of Chiapas from Tacana restaurant
