= ETF Ride Systems =

Dutch manufacturer of amusement ride systems

- Predecessor: Eerste Textielmachine Fabriek BV
- Founded: Nederweert, Netherlands (1999)
- Founder: Ruud Koppens
- Headquarters: Nederweert, Netherlands
- Area served: Worldwide
- Products: Amusement ride systems
- Parent: ETF Group
- Website: Official website

ETF Ride Systems is a Dutch manufacturer of amusement ride systems. It was founded in 1999 and is owned by the ETF Group. The company has manufactured both tracked and trackless systems for both dark and outdoor rides.

== History ==
ETF Ride Systems was founded in 1999 as a subsidiary of the ETF Group. The ETF Group currently encompasses ETF Machinefabriek, Sioux Electronics, ETF USA Corporation, and ETF Ride Systems.

One of the company's first projects was to create a dark ride system for Sally Corporation's Labyrinth of the Minotaur ride. It opened in 2000 at the Terra Mítica amusement park in Spain. The ride system consists of several vehicles featuring laser blasters moving along a trackless system. Although this tracked dark ride system was used on other rides, the company has also developed a trackless dark ride system to expand on their offerings.

In 2010, ETF Ride Systems began designing a new ride system for Europa-Park in Germany. Following nine months of design and construction, Da Vinci Flight opened in August 2011. The ride system consists of several vehicles suspended from an overhead monorail line with guests controlling the speed of the ride through the use of on-board pedals.

Effective July 1, 2024, founder and CEO Ruud Koppens announced his retirement. With no a successor appointed, the company was instead sold off to Liechtenstein's Spieldiener family, owner of Intamin; ETF Ride Systems will however continue to operate independently.

== Products ==
- Multi Mover – dark ride systems which can be either tracked or trackless and optionally feature a motion platform
- Mystic Mover – similar to the trackless version of the Multi Mover but features smaller cars
- Xperience Mover – has the ability to move 360° in all directions with ride media, can be track bound or trackless.
- Panorama Pedal – an indoor/outdoor ride system which allows riders to pedal to control the speed of the motorized vehicle
- Suspended Flight – vehicles are suspended from an overhead monorail line with an operation similar to the Panorama Pedal

The company also has several concepts for rides which they have yet to construct.

== Installations ==
Ride	Park	Location	Opened	Model	Style	Co-developer	Ref(s)
Bullyversum	Bavaria Film Studios	Munich, Germany	2012	Mystic Mover	Trackless		
Bazyliszek	Legendia	Chorzów, Poland	2018	Multi Mover	Trackless		
Challenge of Mondor	Enchanted Forest	(United States) Turner, Oregon, USA	2006	Mystic Mover	Trackless		
Challenge of Tutankhamen	Walibi Belgium	Wavre, Walloon Brabant, Belgium	2003	Multi Mover	Trackless	Sally Corporation	
Da Vinci Flight	Europa-Park	Rust, Germany	2011	Suspended Flight	Track Bound		
Ghost Hunt	Lake Compounce	(United States) Bristol, Connecticut, USA	2008	Mystic Mover	Trackless	Sally Corporation	
Ghostwood Estate	Kennywood	(United States) West Mifflin, Pennsylvania, USA	2008	Mystic Mover	Trackless		
Kingdom Quest	Legoland Discovery Centre	Several locations worldwide		Multi Mover; Mystic Mover	Track Bound; Trackless	P&P Projects	
La Restitution de la Grotte Cosquer	Marseille	Bouches-du-Rhône, Provence-Alpes-Côte d'Azur, France	2022	Multi Mover	Trackless		
Labyrinth of the Minotaur	Terra Mítica	Benidorm, Alicante, Spain	2000	Multi Mover	Trackless	Sally Corporation	
La Aventura de Scooby-Doo	Parque Warner Madrid	San Martín de la Vega, Madrid, Spain	2005	Mystic Mover	Trackless	Sally Corporation	
LEGO Factory Adventure Ride	Legoland New York	(United States) Goshen, New York, USA	2021	Xperience Mover	Trackless	Holovis	
Maus au Chocolat	Phantasialand	Brühl, North Rhine-Westphalia, Germany	2011	Multi Mover	Track Bound	3DBA	
Motor Mania	ring°werk	Nürburg, Rhineland-Palatinate, Germany	2009	Multi Mover	Trackless		
Nights in White Satin: The Trip	Freestyle Music Park	(United States) Myrtle Beach, South Carolina, USA	2008	Multi Mover	Track Bound	Sally Corporation	
Popcorn Revenge	Walibi Belgium	Wavre, Walloon Brabant, Belgium	2019	Multi Mover	Trackless	Alterface	
Safari Tuneli	Vialand	Istanbul, Turkey	2013	Mystic Mover	Trackless	P&P Projects	
Symbolica	Efteling	Kaatsheuvel, The Netherlands	2017	Multi Mover	Trackless		
Thor's Hammer	Tusenfryd	Vinterbro, Norway	2013	Multi Mover	Track Bound	P&P Projects	
Vi På Saltkråkan	Astrid Lindgren's World	Vimmerby, Sweden	2007	Mystic Mover	Trackless	Sally Corporation	
Volcans Sacrés	Vulcania	Saint-Ours-les-Roches, Auvergne, France	2013	Multi Mover	Trackless		
Zindan	Vialand	Istanbul, Turkey	2013	Mystic Mover	Trackless	P&P Projects	
