= Penaten =

German brand of healthcare products

- Industry: Healthcare products
- Founded: 1904; 121 years ago in Rhöndorf, German Empire
- Founder: Max Riese
- Parent: Kenvue
- Website: www.penaten.de

Penaten is a German brand of healthcare products, including baby cream (barrier cream) owned by Kenvue.

Its name is taken from the Penates, the household deities of Ancient Rome.

The Penaten Cream was developed by German chemist Max Riese in 1904. The production was based in a factory built in 1908 in Rhöndorf which was destroyed during the Second World War. It was rebuilt by Riese's sons Max and Alfred.

In 1986 Penaten became part of the Johnson & Johnson company. In 2000, the production of the cream was moved to Italy and France.

J&J now sells petroleum jelly in tubes that hold the same name as the original medicinal zinc cream: “PENATEN”. This is a completely different product to the original Penaten cream.

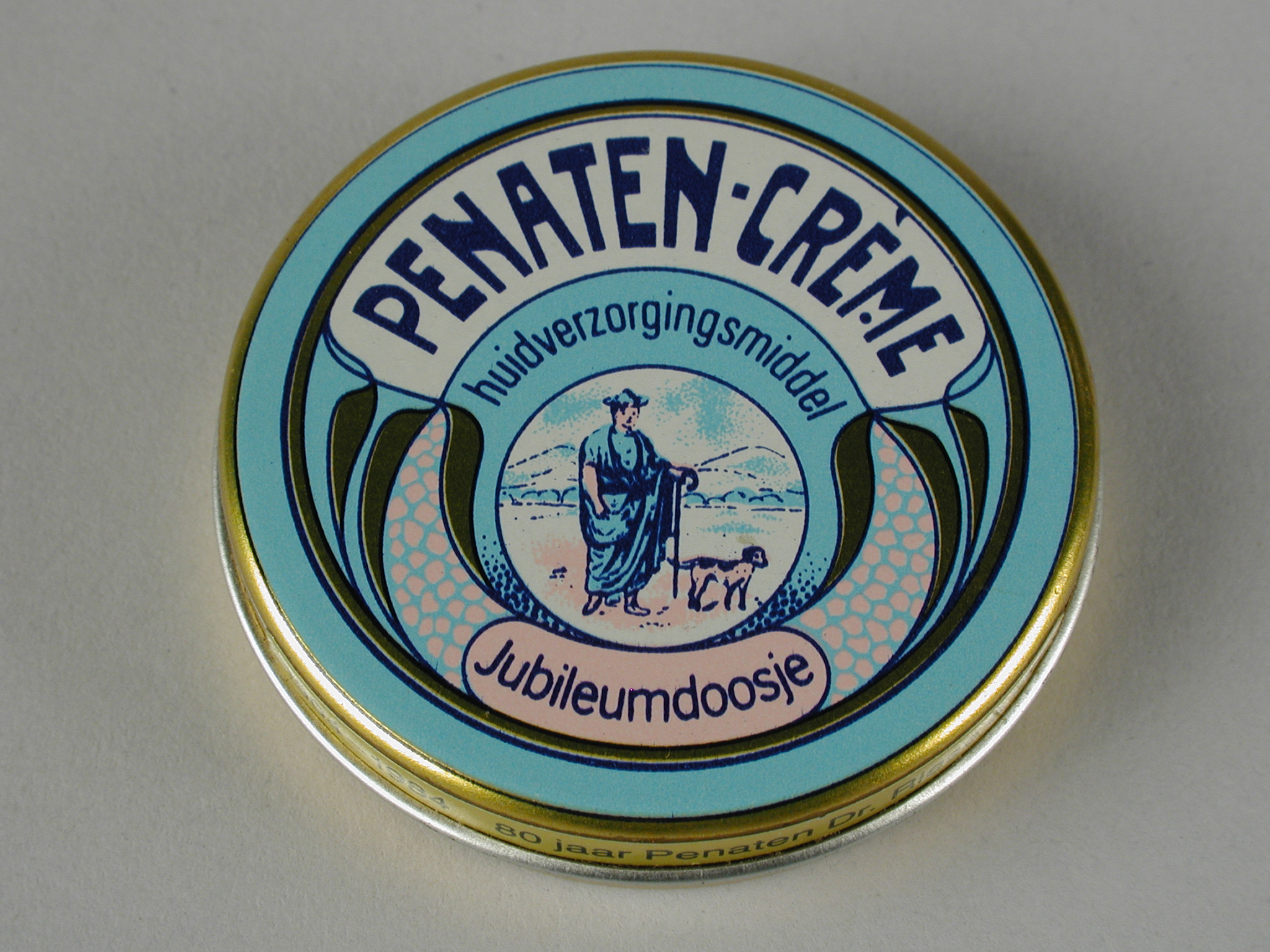
Penaten cream in 1904

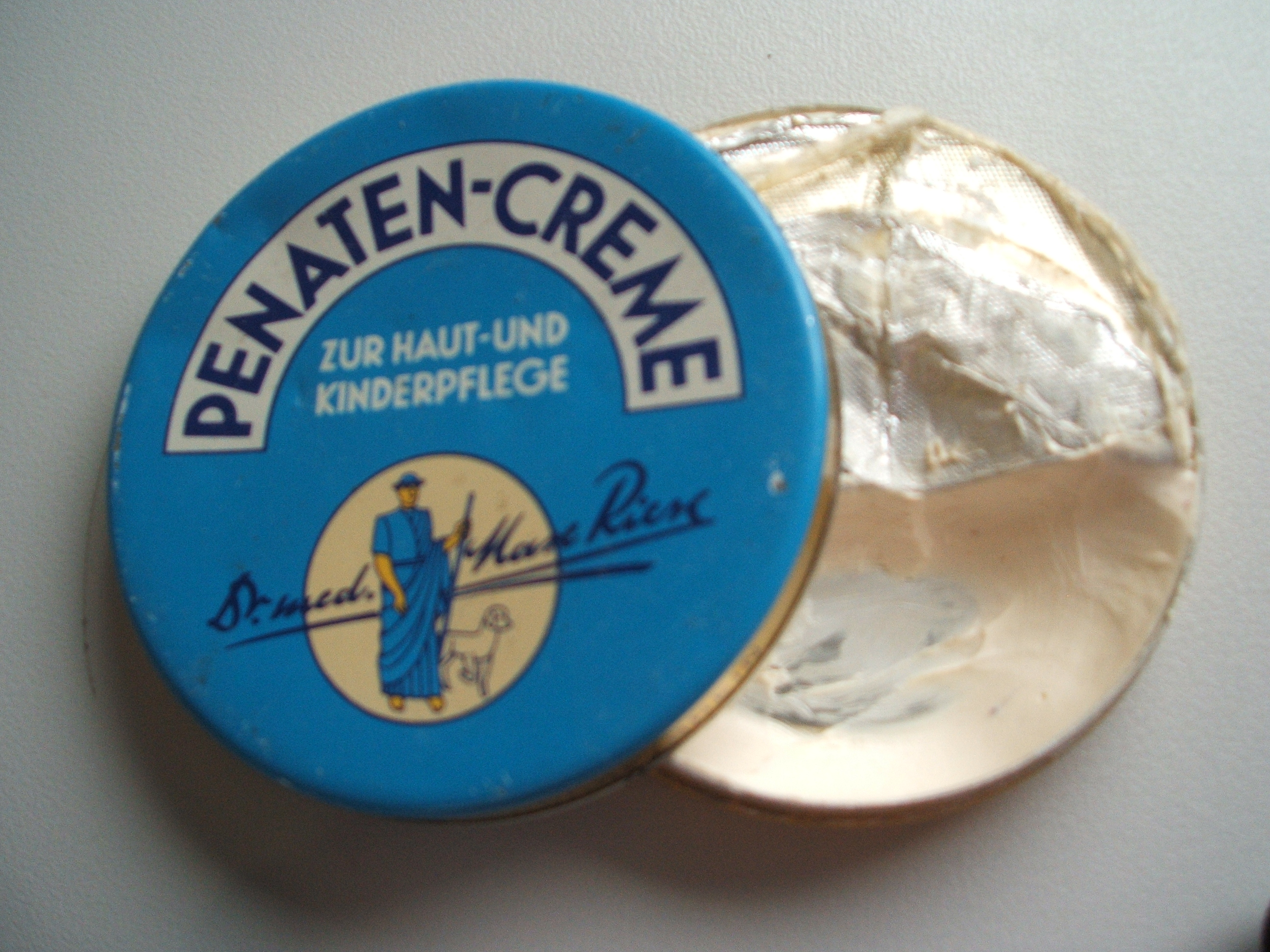
Penaten cream in the 1980s

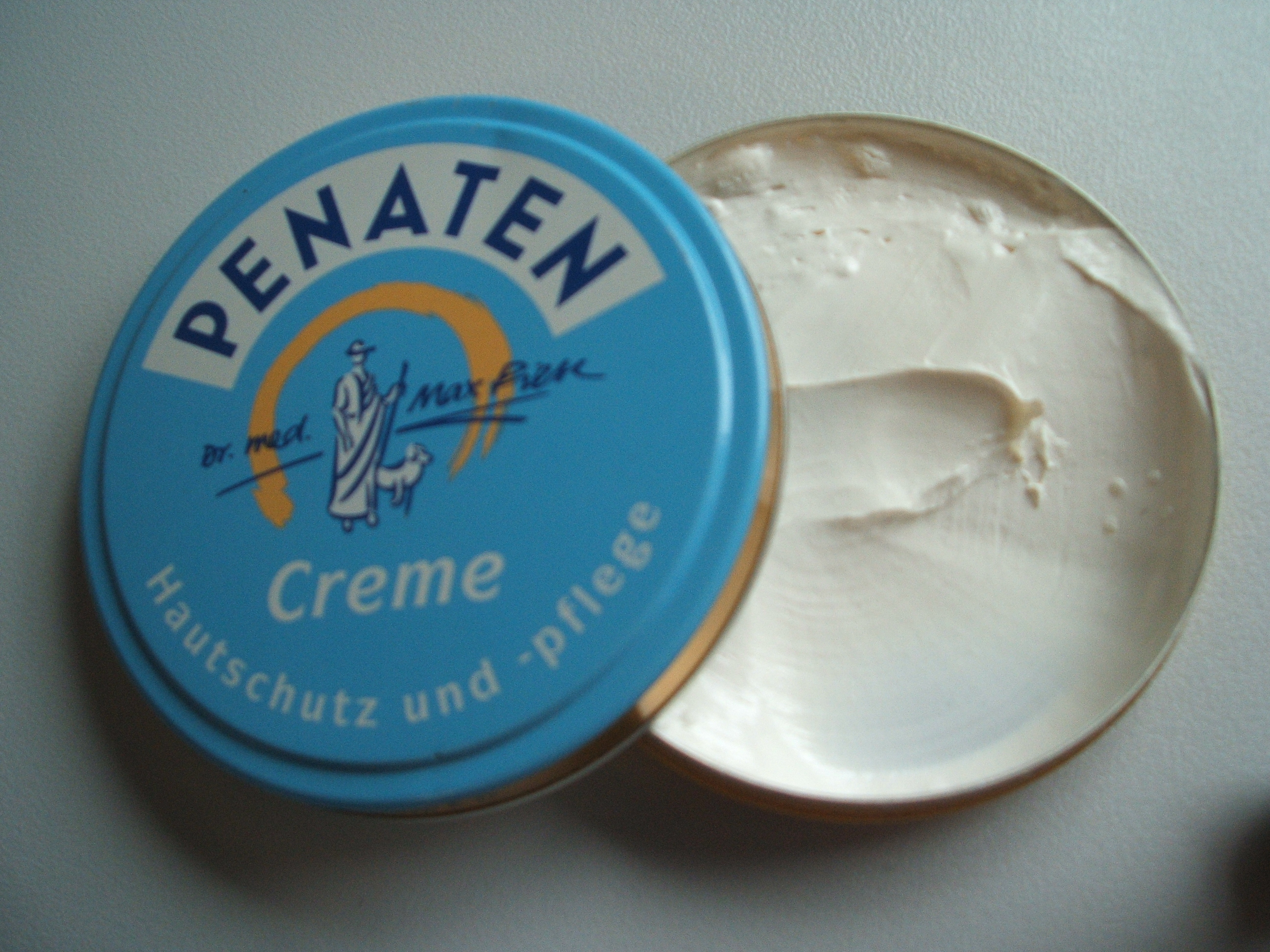
Penaten cream in 2004

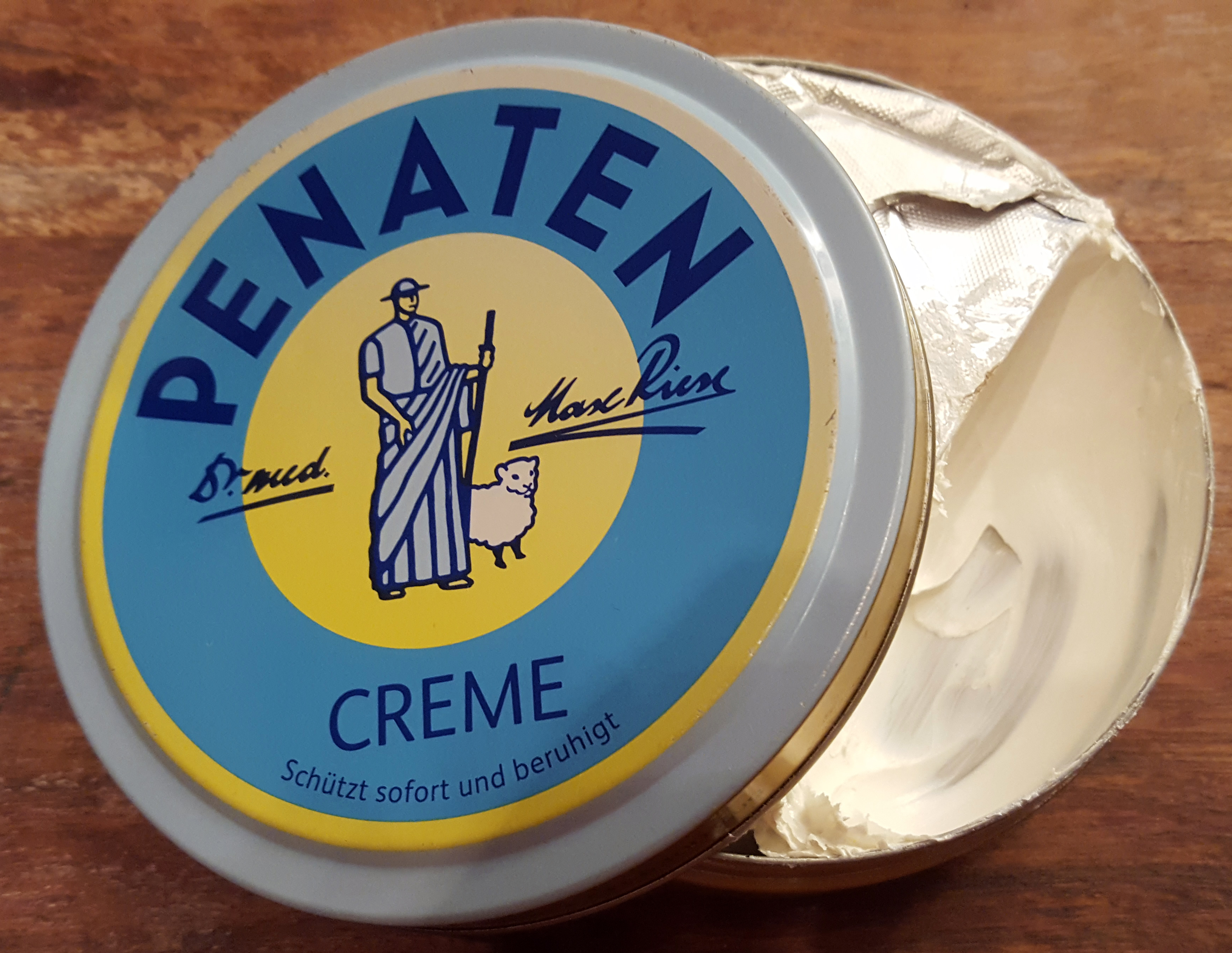
Penaten cream in 2015

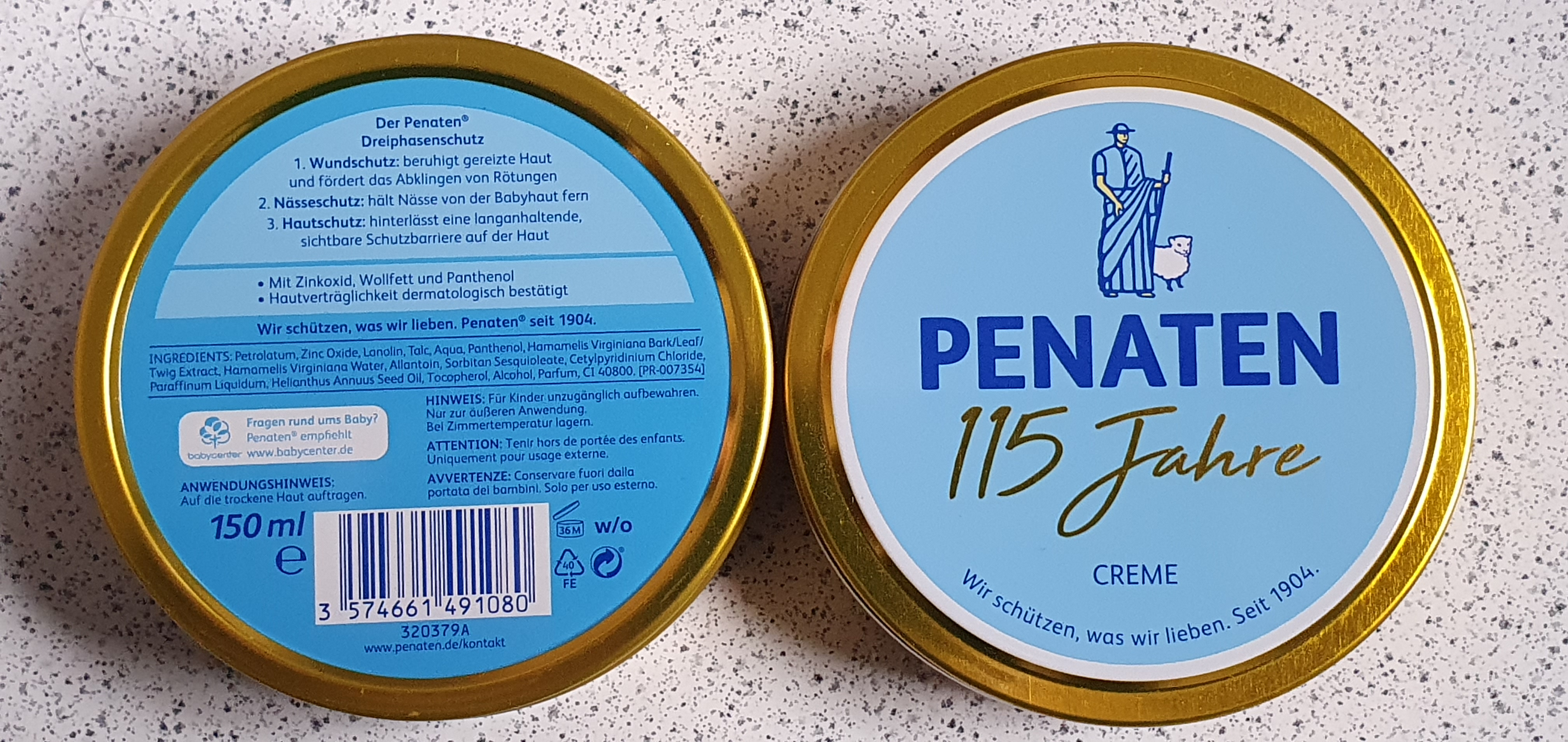
Penaten cream in 2019

== History ==
Chemist Max Riese and Otto Schmithausen invented Penaten Cream in 1904 in the town of Honnef, Germany and registered the patent on 17 September 1904. The cream primarily contained zinc oxide and lanolin and had a light lemon aroma.

Max Riese's wife Elizabeth named the cream "Penaten", after Penates, the Roman gods of household protection.
