= List of former Kentucky Kingdom attractions =

This is a list of rides and attractions that previously operated at Kentucky Kingdom, an amusement park in Louisville, Kentucky, United States.

== Former roller coasters ==
Ride	Opened	Closed	Manufacturer	Type	Description
Starchaser	1987	1995	Schwarzkopf	Enclosed steel roller coaster (Jet Star)	Removed in 1995 due to a pending lawsuit from guests who were injured on the ride the year prior. The ride originally operated at Beech Bend from some point between 1968 and 1972 to 1984, where it was known as Jet Star. It was then moved to Six Flags Darien Lake in 1996, where it operated until 1998 as Nightmare At Phantom Cave, before moving to its final location at Great Escape, where it was again renamed Nightmare at Crack Axle Canyon. It operated at the park from 1999 to 2006 before closing permanently. At Kentucky Kingdom, the ride's building became home to the Thrill Park Theater.
Vampire	1990	1999	Vekoma	Steel shuttle roller coaster (Boomerang)	Vampire originally opened in 1985 at Star Lake Amusement Park in China, where it was known as Boomerang. It operated there until 1990, before being brought to Kentucky Kingdom. The ride was removed from Kentucky Kingdom in 1999 due to mechanical issues. It was then moved to Six Flags New England, where it has operated as Flashback since 2000.
Twisted Twins Previously Twisted Sisters (1998–2001)	1998	2007	Custom Coasters International	Dual-tracked wooden roller coaster	The ride closed following the 2007 season as part of an effort to cut costs. It was renovated by Rocky Mountain Coasters and reopened as Storm Chaser in 2016.
Chang	1997	2009	Bolliger & Mabillard	Steel stand-up roller coaster	Chang was the tallest, fastest and longest stand-up coaster in the world when it opened. After closing at Kentucky Kingdom, it was relocated to Six Flags Great Adventure, where it reopened as Green Lantern for the 2011 season. It closed permanently and was scrapped following the 2024 season. At Kentucky Kingdom, the ride was replaced by the water park, Hurricane Bay.
Road Runner Express	2000	2009	Maurer AG	Steel wild mouse roller coaster	When Six Flags closed Kentucky Kingdom in 2009, Road Runner Express was retained by them as part of a settlement between them and the park's owner, the Kentucky State Fair Board. It was relocated to Six Flags New England for the 2011 season, and renamed Gotham City Gauntlet: Escape from Arkham Asylum. At Kentucky Kingdom, the ride was replaced by Honeybee Buzzers and the now-defunct Cyclos.
Greezed Lightnin'	2003	2009	Schwarzkopf	Steel launched shuttle roller coaster (Shuttle Loop)	The ride originally operated at Six Flags Great America as Tidal Wave from 1978 to 1991. It was then moved to Six Flags Over Georgia, where it operated as Viper from 1995 to 2001. At Kentucky Kingdom, the ride was removed to make way for Stampede Run.
T3 Previously T2: Terror to the Second Power (1995–2014)	1995	2022	Vekoma	Steel inverted roller coaster (Suspended Looping Coaster)	The ride opened as T2: Terror to the Second Power, and was the first Suspended Looping Coaster in North America, as well as only the second in the world. When the park closed in 2009, the ride was left standing until the park reopened in 2014. The ride was refurbished and given new trains, and reopened as T3 the following year. After closing at Kentucky Kingdom, it was sold to Wonderla in India, where it reopened as Garuda Glide in 2026.

== Former rides ==
Ride	Opened	Closed	Manufacturer	Type	Description
Crystal Carousel	1987	1987	Unknown	Double-decker carousel	Located behind a fountain at the park's entrance. It was replaced by the now-defunct Hellevator (later Superman: Tower of Power) in 1995.
Force 10	1987	1987	Unknown	Spinning ride	Auctioned off and replaced in 1990 by Breakdance
Pontiac's Tin Lizzy Junction	1987	1987	Unknown	Antique cars	Sponsored by Pontiac. The ride's track was reused in 1990 by another antique car ride, known originally as Tin Lizzies Starlight Speedway and later as Country Cruisers.
Smash-Crash-Bash'em	1987	1987	Unknown	Bumper cars	The building the ride operated in was reused as an arcade
Kentucky Whirl	1987	1987	Zierer	Swing ride	Replaced by the now-defunct Bumper Cars in 1990
Ohio River Adventure	1987	1987	Arrow Dynamics	Log flume	Relocated to Silverwood Theme Park. Replaced at Kentucky Kingdom by Vampire in 1990.
Tornado	1987	1987	Unknown	Unknown	
Whirlaway	1987	1987	Chance Rides	Trabant	Relocated to Michigan's Adventure, where it reopened as Trabant in 1989
Ranger	1990	1993	HUSS Park Attractions	Ranger	Replaced by the now-defunct Rainbow in 1994
Round Up	1987	1995	Frank Hrubetz & Company	Round Up	
The Squid	1990	1997	Unknown	Four water slides	Replaced by Road Runner Express in 2000
Jester's June Bugs	1990	2001	Zamperla	Junior Jet	Moved to Six Flags Worlds of Adventure (later Geauga Lake), and following the former's 2007 closure, moved to Knoebels Amusement Resort, where it reopened as Goin' Buggy in 2009
Starcastle Voyage	1997	2001	Unknown	Miniature carousel	Moved to Geauga Lake until the park's 2007 closure
Mini Tea Cups	1998	2001	Unknown	Teacups	Moved to Geauga Lake until the park's 2007 closure
Thriller Bees	1998	2001	HUSS Park Attractions	Ramba Zamba	Moved to Geauga Lake until the park's 2007 closure. Later stored at Six Flags Darien Lake.
The Quake	1992	2004	Vekoma	Wakiki Wave	Replaced by the Tornado water slide in Hurricane Bay in 2005
Slingshot	2002	2004	Funtime	Slingshot	Was an upcharge attraction. Later moved to Elitch Gardens Theme Park.
Chaos	1998	2005	Chance Rides	Chaos	Replaced by the now-defunct Deluge in 2007
Top Eliminator Dragsters	1996	2005	ThrillTime Entertainment International	3/4 scale dragsters	
The Great Race	1998	2006	Unknown	Spinning children's ride	Replaced by the now-defunct Deluge in 2007
Superman: Tower of Power Previously Hellevator (1995–2006)	1995	2007	Intamin	Drop tower	177 ft (54 m) tall. Closed following a serious accident that resulted in the amputation of a 13-year-old girl's feet.
Rainbow	1994	2008	HUSS Park Attractions	Rainbow	Removed as a precaution following a serious malfunction of a Rainbow ride at Liseberg. Replaced by Up Up and Away in 2015
Turbo Bungy	2000	2008	Unknown	Small bungee jumping attraction	Upcharge attraction
Skycoaster	2001	2009	Skycoaster, Inc	Skycoaster	Upcharge attraction. At 180 ft (55 m) tall, it was the tallest attraction in the park.
Bumper Cars	1990	2009	Majestic	Bumper cars	Replaced by Mad Hatter (later Jolly Juleps) in 2014
Thrill Park Theater	1996	2009	Unknown	Motion picture simulator	The ride closed with the park after the 2009 season. Replaced with the 5-D Cinema for the 2014 season.
Looney Tunes Acme Fun Factory	1997	2009	SCS Interactive	Children's play area	
Taz's Filmworks	1990	2009	Sartori	Miniature swing ride	Replaced by Whirl Around Swings (later Harvest Swing)
Yosemite Sam's Hollywood Flight School Previously Royal Air Force	1990	2009	Allan Herschell Company	Spinning children's ride	Replaced by Jump Around (later Friendly Frogs)
The Wall	1999	2009	Unknown	Climbing wall	
Thrill Karts	1997	2009	J&J Amusements	Go-karts	
Enterprise	1990	2017	HUSS Park Attractions	Enterprise	Replaced by Scream Extreme (later Whirlwind) in 2018
Free Falling Fire Engine	1995	2018	Zamperla	Crazy Bus	Removed to make way for the relocation of newly renamed Treetop Drop (formerly FearFALL) in 2025
Loony Balloony Previously A'Wound the World in 80 Seconds and Samba Balloon Ride	1990	2018	Zamperla	Balloon Race	
Sun & Moon Ferris Wheel	1990	2021	Unknown	Miniature Ferris wheel	
Rio Grande Train	1998	2021	Zamperla	Miniature train	Removed to make way for the relocation of Rowdy Racers (formerly Speedway, and later Loopy Lambs) in 2022
Deluge	2007	2021	Unknown	Water slide	
Cyclos	2015	2024	Zamperla	Frisbee (Discovery Revolution)	Relocated to Santa Cruz Beach Boardwalk in 2025
Eye Of The Storm	2017	2024	Larson International	Fire Ball	
Raging Rapids River Ride Previously Penguin's Blizzard River (1999–2009)	1999	2024	Intamin, Hopkins Rides	River rapids ride	Built with relocated remnants of Grizzly River Rampage, a ride of the same model which operayed at Opryland USA from 1981 to 1997. The ride reopened in 2015 after receiving new boats from Hopkins Rides.
Rock 'n' Roller	2018	2025	Zamperla	Mini Himalaya	Zamperla Mini Himalaya
5-D Cinema	2014	2026	SimEx-Iwerks	4-D theater	Played a new film each year. The ride closed after the 2025 season and was replaced by Midnight Showdown.
