= Kentucky Flyer =

Roller coaster at Kentucky Kingdom

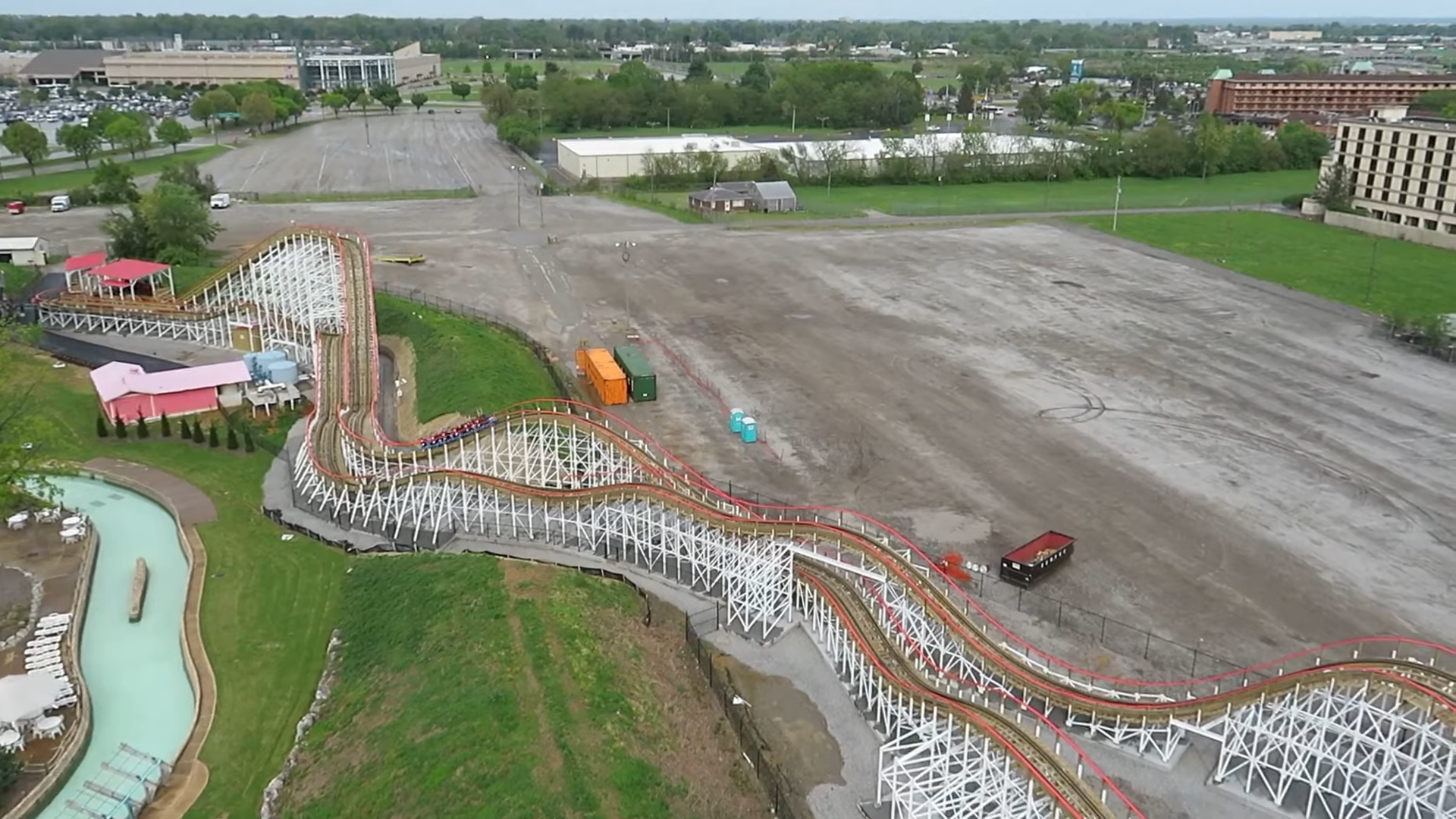

Kentucky Kingdom
- Location: Kentucky Kingdom
- Coordinates: 38.194292°N 85.744271°W
- Status: Operating
- Soft opening date: April 26, 2019
- Opening date: April 28, 2019
- Cost: $5,000,000

General statistics
- Type: Wood – Family
- Manufacturer: Gravitykraft Corporation
- Designer: The Gravity Group
- Track layout: Out-and-back
- Lift/launch system: Chain lift hill
- Height: 47 ft (14 m)
- Drop: 44 ft (13 m)
- Length: 1,288 ft (393 m)
- Speed: 35 mph (56 km/h)
- Inversions: 0
- Duration: 1:00
- Max vertical angle: 52°
- Height restriction: 40 in (102 cm)
- Trains: 2 trains with 6 cars; riders arranged 2 across in a single row for a total of 12 riders per train
- Website: Official website
- Kentucky Flyer at RCDB

Kentucky Flyer is a wooden roller coaster located at Kentucky Kingdom in Louisville, Kentucky, United States. The coaster opened on April 28, 2019, to celebrate Kentucky Kingdom's 30th anniversary. The ride was designed by The Gravity Group and uses a steel support structure.

== History ==
Kentucky Kingdom teased a new attraction on September 14, 2018, hinting at an aviation-themed ride. Kentucky Flyer was announced on September 21, 2018, with a planned opening year of 2019. The ride was planned to be a family-friendly wooden coaster from The Gravity Group and Gravitykraft Corporation of Cincinnati, Ohio, with plane-themed trains and top speeds of 35 mph (56 km/h). It was intended to serve as a celebration of the park's 30th anniversary.

Construction on Kentucky Flyer began soon after its public announcement, but was halted in mid-October by the park's landlord, the Kentucky State Fair Board, who stopped the park from preceding with any kind of work and payments on the ride. The Fair Board cited that the park could not use the planned land because expanding into it would require talks with several landlord parties, despite land having already been promised to the park in a previous lease. In an October 16 press conference on the construction site, park CEO Ed Hart claimed that the Fair Board was withholding access in an attempt to strong-arm the park into dropping a lawsuit over the Fair Board's breaking of a paid parking lease, instead giving rented spots out to Kentucky State Fair vendors. The following day, after governor Matt Bevin and his administration became involved, the Fair Board granted permission for the park to continue with its plans.

In November 2018, Kentucky Flyer's plane-themed lead car was put on display at the International Association of Amusement Parks and Attractions 2018 Expo in Orlando, Florida. Foundations were being poured at the time, and the coaster's structure went vertical on November 30, 2018. Work continued throughout the winter, and was completed in early spring 2019. On April 12, 2019, Kentucky Flyer began testing trains on the layout, and the coaster opened to the public on April 28.

== Characteristics ==
=== Statistics ===
Kentucky Flyer's highest point is 47 feet (14 m) tall, its total length is 1,288 feet (393 m), and the ride features top speeds of 35 mph (56 km/h), which is achieved on the 52°, 44-foot (13 m) first drop. There are 12 airtime moments throughout the ride, and maximum banking angles of 54°.

The structure consists of painted steel, and the track and handrails are wooden. The ride is classified as a hybrid wooden coaster.

Kentucky Flyer operates with a pair of 12-passenger Timberliner trains, which have airplane-inspired lead cars and lap bars. It is located in the back of the park behind the Hurricane Bay water park.

== Ride experience ==
Riders depart the station and immediately ascend the 47-foot (14 m) tall lift hill, before turning slightly to the right and plunging down the 44-foot (13 m) drop at a 52° angle. The ride twists into a pair of double-ups before hitting the left-hand turnaround, banked at 54°. Several airtime hills are traversed on the way back before the train drops down into the final brake run, before making a right-hand turn back into the station.
