= Thunder Run =

Thunder Run may refer to:

- Thunder Run (film), a 1986 American action-thriller film
- Thunder Run (Canada's Wonderland), a roller coaster at Canada's Wonderland
- Thunder Run (Kentucky Kingdom), a wooden roller coaster at Kentucky Kingdom
- Thunder run, a type of military raid conducted using armored and mechanized forces
  - Thunder Runs, a series of raids in the 2003 Battle of Baghdad
- Internet slang for the June 2023 Wagner Group Rebellion
- "Thunder Run", a 2020 novel Daniel José Older
- Thunder run, a theatrical term to refer to a wooden trough used to recreate the sound of thunder
