= Gotham City Gauntlet: Escape from Arkham Asylum =

Roller coaster at Six Flags New England

- Previously known as Road Runner Express at Six Flags Kentucky Kingdom (2000-2009)

Six Flags New England
- Park section: DC Universe
- Coordinates: 42.0406°N 72.6146°W
- Status: Operating
- Opening date: April 16, 2011

Six Flags Kentucky Kingdom
- Coordinates: 38.196385°N 85.744267°W
- Status: Removed
- Opening date: May 2000
- Closing date: 2009
- Replaced: The Squid

General statistics
- Type: Steel – Wild Mouse – Family
- Manufacturer: Maurer AG
- Designer: Ingenieur Buro Stengel GmbH
- Model: Wilde Maus Classic
- Lift/launch system: Chain lift hill
- Height: 49.25 ft (15.01 m)
- Length: 1,213.9 ft (370.0 m)
- Speed: 28 mph (45 km/h)
- Inversions: 0
- Duration: 1:32
- Max vertical angle: 46°
- Capacity: 900 riders per hour
- Height restriction: 46 in (117 cm)
- Fast Lane available
- Gotham City Gauntlet: Escape from Arkham Asylum at RCDB

Gotham City Gauntlet: Escape from Arkham Asylum, formerly known as Road Runner Express, is a steel wild mouse roller coaster at Six Flags New England in Agawam, Massachusetts.

== History ==
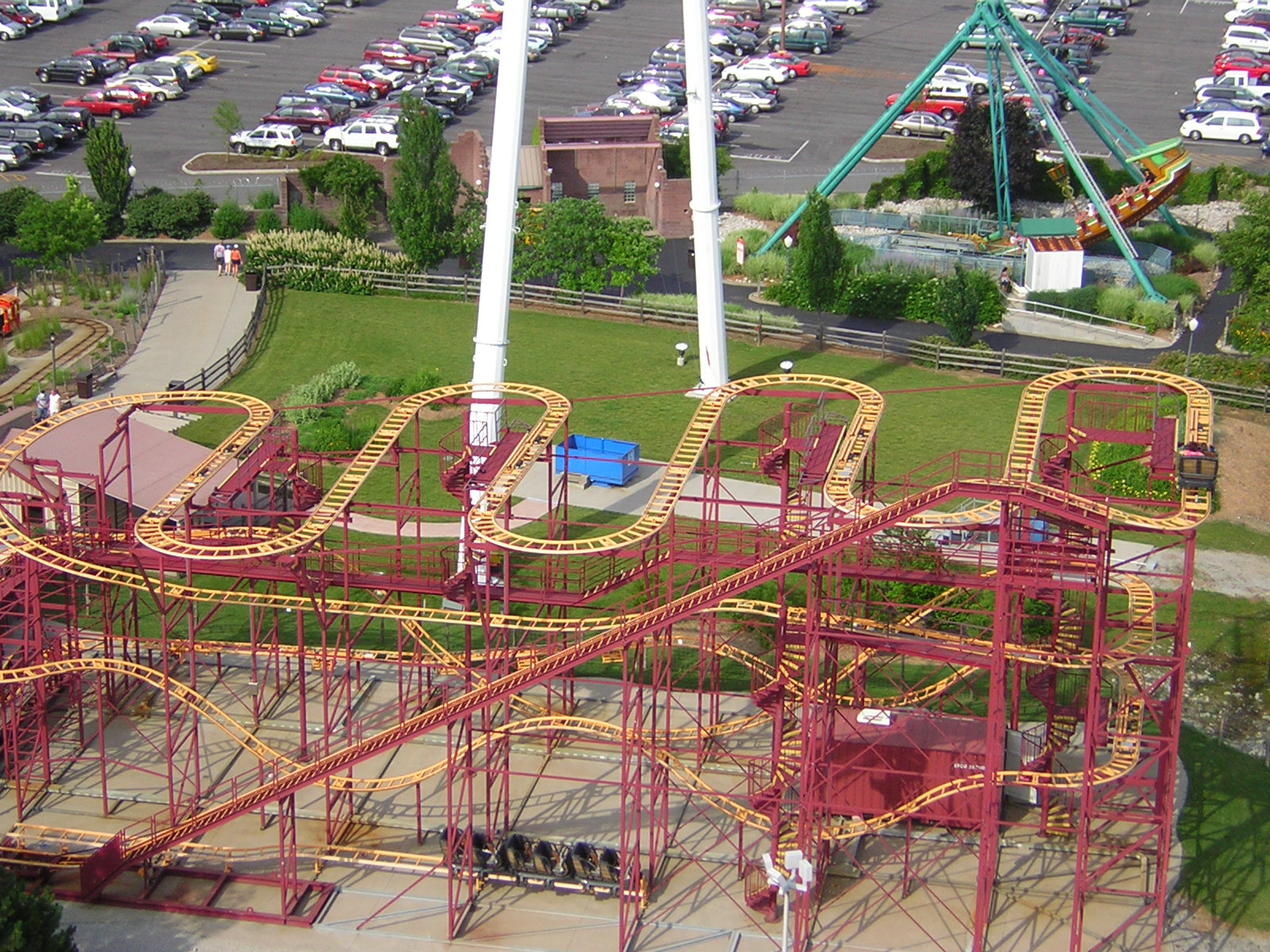
Gotham City Gauntlet: Escape from Arkham Asylum when it was Road Runner Express at Kentucky Kingdom.

In May 2000, Kentucky Kingdom (then Six Flags Kentucky Kingdom) in Louisville, Kentucky installed a new roller coaster. It opened on the former site of Vampire, which was later relocated to Six Flags New England as Flashback.

The ride operated as Road Runner Express (named for a Looney Tunes character, Road Runner) from its opening until the end of the 2009 season, when Six Flags rejected the park's lease after a dispute with the park's owner, the Kentucky State Fair Board, and abandoned the park. As part of Six Flags' settlement with the Kentucky State Fair Board, Road Runner Express was removed from the Kentucky Kingdom site and relocated to Six Flags New England.

In 2011, the ride reopened as Gotham City Gauntlet: Escape From Arkham Asylum. The coaster opened on a site that formerly housed the Batman Stunt Show arena.

== See also ==
- 2011 in amusement parks
