= Hollyhock and Roll =

Roller coaster at Kentucky Kingdom

- Previously known as Roller Skater (1994–2024)
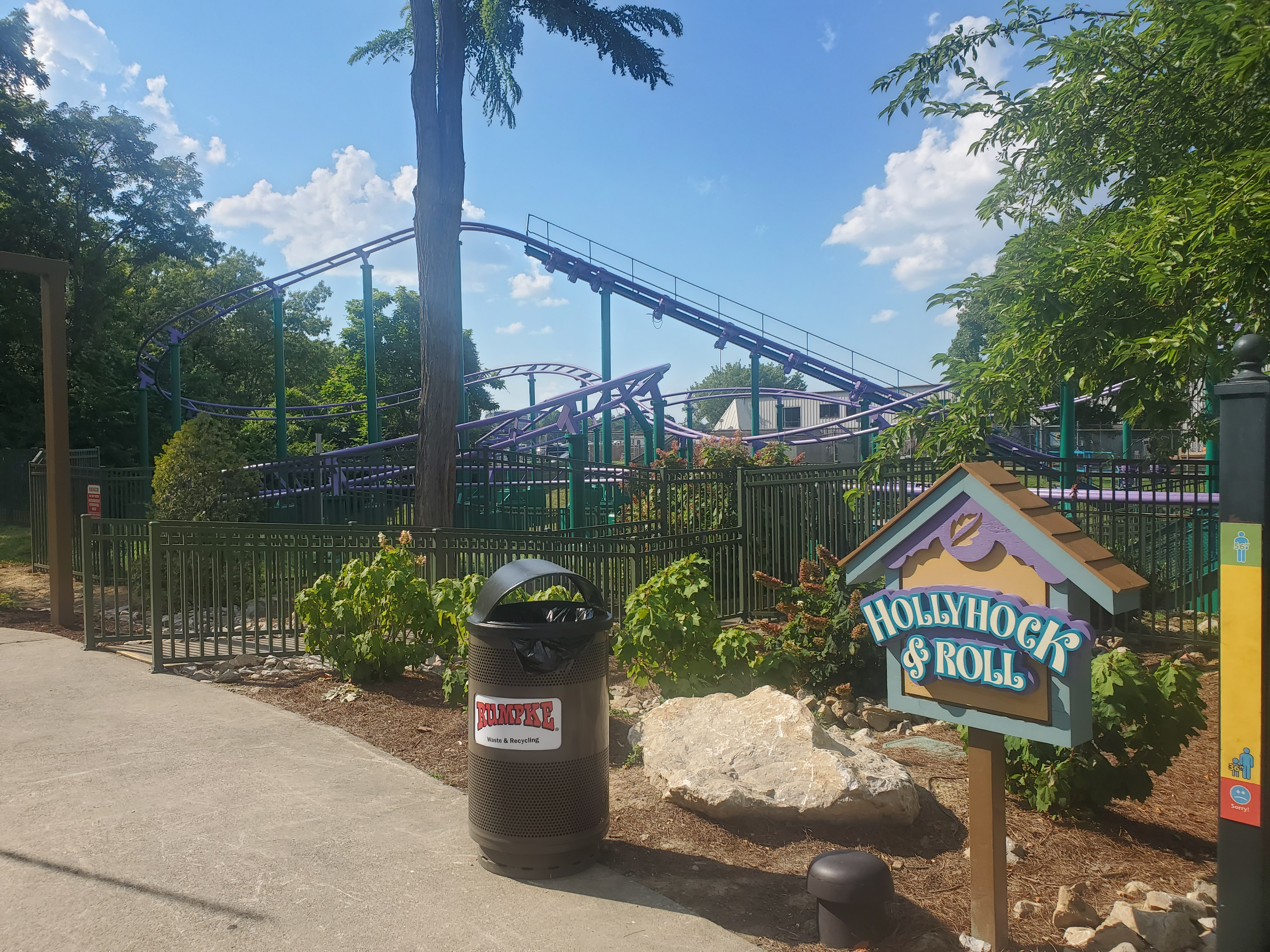

Kentucky Kingdom
- Location: Kentucky Kingdom
- Park section: Discovery Meadow
- Coordinates: 38.196749°N 85.747558°W
- Status: Operating
- Opening date: April 15, 1994
- Cost: $1.2 million

General statistics
- Type: Steel
- Manufacturer: Vekoma
- Designer: Peter Clerx
- Model: Junior Coaster (207m)
- Height: 27.9 ft (8.5 m)
- Length: 679.1 ft (207.0 m)
- Speed: 21.7 mph (34.9 km/h)
- Inversions: 0
- Duration: 0:50
- Capacity: 780 riders per hour
- Height restriction: 36 in (91 cm)
- Trains: Single train with 8 cars; riders arranged 2 across in a single row for a total of 16 riders per train
- Hollyhock and Roll at RCDB

Hollyhock and Roll is a steel children's roller coaster at Kentucky Kingdom in Louisville, Kentucky, United States. The ride originally opened as Roller Skater in April 1994 with roller skate-shaped rider vehicles. It is a Junior Coaster built by Vekoma.

== History ==
The ride was constructed by Martin & Vleminckx. Roller Skater opened on April 15, 1994, as part of a $5 million expansion that included three other rides. The ride closed alongside the rest of the park in 2009.

The ride was repainted in August 2013 as the park was renovated during plans for a reopening, and it officially reopened on May 24, 2014.

In 2025, the area in which Roller Skater sits was rethemed to Discovery Meadow. Roller Skater was renamed to Hollyhock and Roll to match the theme of Discovery Meadow. It was also repainted.
