= Kentucky Kingdom =

Amusement park in Louisville, Kentucky

- Previously known as Six Flags Kentucky Kingdom (1998–2010)

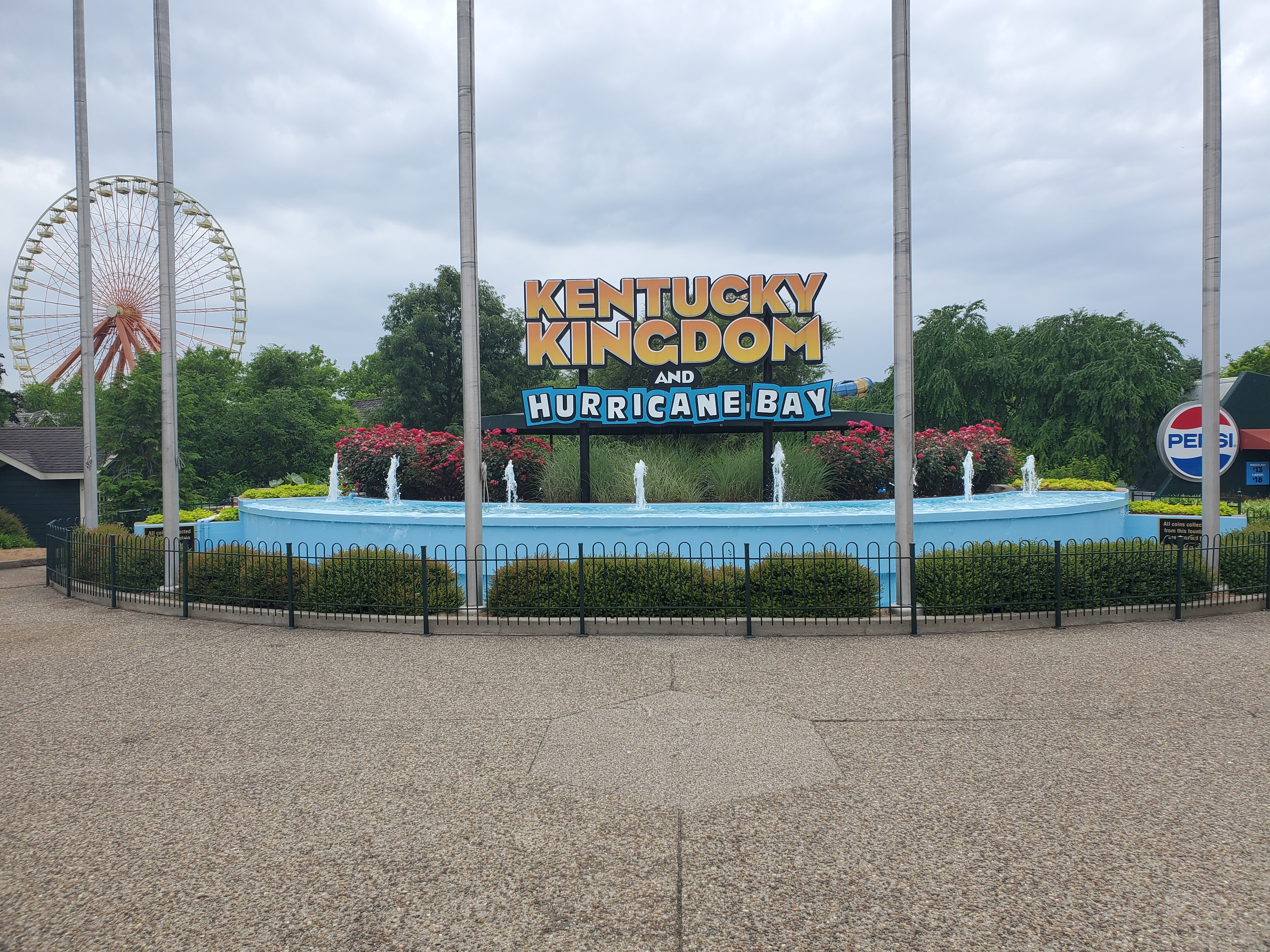
- Interactive map of Kentucky Kingdom
- Location: Louisville, Kentucky, United States
- Coordinates: 38.195427°N 85.747245°W
- Status: Operating
- Opened: May 23, 1987; 39 years ago
- Owner: Kentucky State Fair Board
- Operated by: Herschend
- General manager: Sarah Worrell
- Operating season: May–January
- Area: 67 acres (27 ha)

Attractions
- Total: 55
- Roller coasters: 6
- Water rides: 2
- Website: kentuckykingdom.com

Kentucky Kingdom, formerly known as Six Flags Kentucky Kingdom, is a theme park in Louisville, Kentucky, United States. The 67-acre (27 ha) park includes a collection of amusement rides, as well as the Hurricane Bay water park. Kentucky Kingdom is owned by the Kentucky State Fair Board and operated by Herschend.

In 1977, the Kentucky State Fair Board announced plans to build an amusement park on the grounds of the Kentucky Fair and Exposition Center. The park's construction, overseen by Kentucky Entertainment Limited, began in 1986 and cost $12 million. Kentucky Kingdom opened to the public on May 23, 1987. The park went bankrupt and closed after a single season, but was reopened in 1990 by businessman Ed Hart. Due to loan payment challenges, Kentucky Kingdom was sold in 1998 to Six Flags, which operated the park until it was closed in 2009. After several years of inactivity, Hart reopened the park in 2014. The park's operating rights were sold to Herschend in 2021.

Kentucky Kingdom has several notable roller coasters, including Flying Fox, Kentucky Flyer, Stampede Run, Wind Chaser, and Woodland Run.

== History ==
=== Foundation ===
==== Planning and construction ====
The Kentucky State Fair Board released a long-term plan for the redevelopment and expansion of the Kentucky Fair and Exposition Center grounds on March 24, 1977, which included the construction of a theme park. The Fair Board suggested the park should be divided into three sections: a turn-of-the-century village, a Daniel Boone town and a "unit devoted to Kentucky's mining industry". Several years later, the Fair Board began searching for a developer who could operate the planned park. On November 21, 1985, they signed a contract with Kentucky Entertainment Limited, headed by Dallas-based businessman Michael Jenkins.

At a press conference on December 13, 1985, Kentucky Entertainment Limited and the Fair Board announced plans for Kentucky Kingdom, a 13-acre theme park inspired by Kentucky's history and culture, set to open in 1987. Construction began on March 28, 1986, with a team of mules and a 60-year old plow breaking the first ground. On May 16, 1987, more than 6,000 Girl Scouts and their relatives were allowed to preview the park a week before opening. Most of the reviews were negative, as visitors complained about long lines and poor crowd control.

==== Opening and first closure ====
Kentucky Kingdom opened on May 23, 1987, with about 400 people in attendance at the opening ceremony. The park had four themed areas called "Carousel Plaza", "Old Louisville", "Kentucky Frontier", and "The Enchanted Forest". The latter was a children's area which would later become "King Louie's Playland". Many early visitors to Kentucky Kingdom complained about the park's small size and its lack of attractions. One visitor said, "What few rides Kentucky Kingdom did have seemed to be oriented to younger children. In fact, most of the park seemed to be oriented to children. But what about the parents who take them there? What do they ride or do while waiting for their kids?" The park closed and filed for bankruptcy after only one season due to low attendance numbers, which were attributed to the small amount of attractions and poor weather conditions throughout the 1987 season. Most of the contractors and vendors were unpaid and almost all of the rides were auctioned off to other parks on April 15, 1989.

=== Acquisition by Ed Hart and first reopening ===
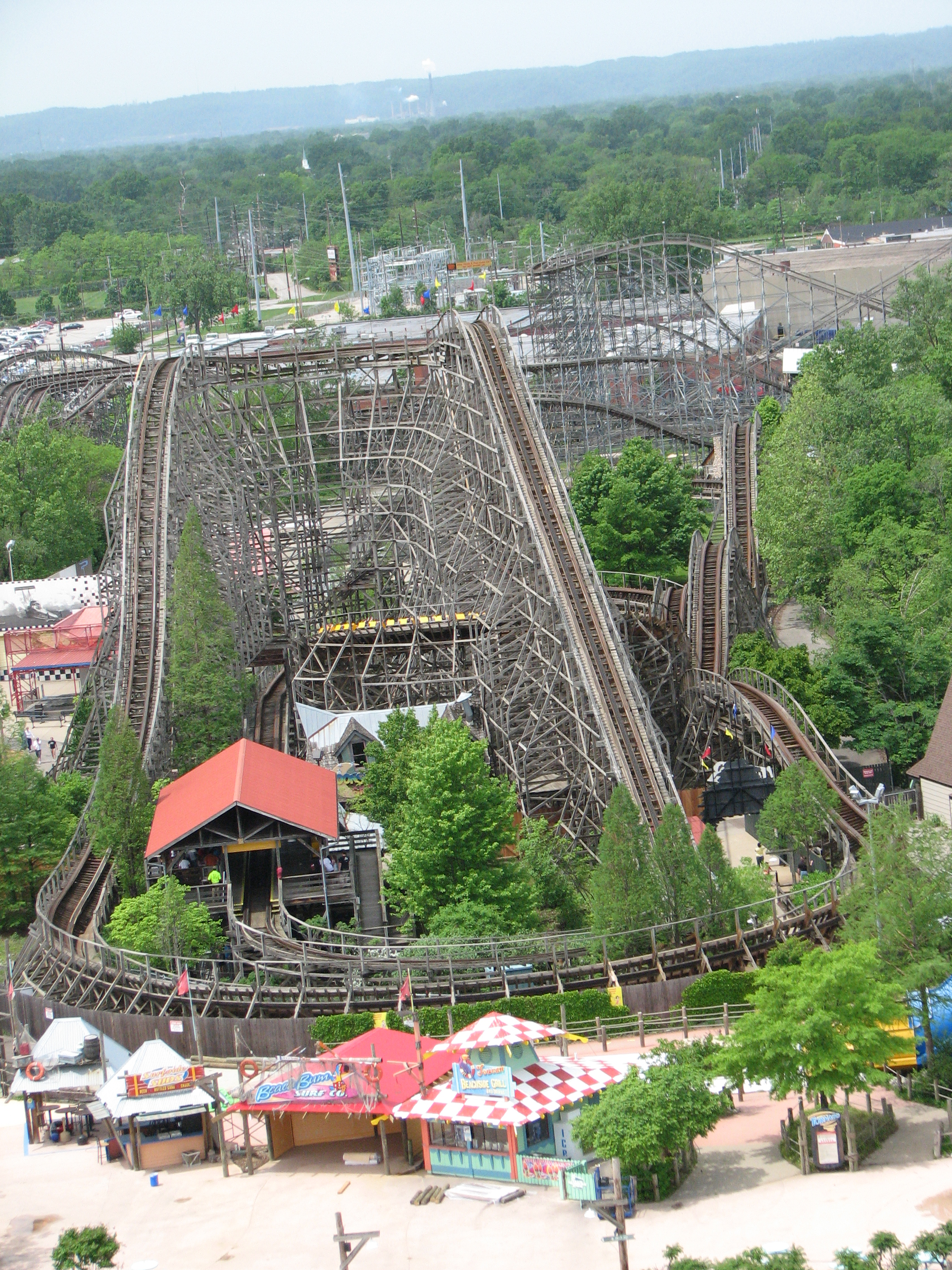
Thunder Run opened in 1990, and was the first ride added to the second half of the park

The rights to operate Kentucky Kingdom were purchased by Ed Hart and a group of investors in April 1989. Hart was a local businessman who had renovated two buildings in Louisville's Highlands neighborhood. After Kentucky Kingdom closed, he was contacted by the National Bank of Canada, who offered to be the senior lender if he reopened the park. Hart initially declined, discouraged by the stories of Kentucky Kingdom's failure, but later changed his mind. Hart's first step was paying the 227 vendors and contractors that were previously left unpaid after the park's first season. In December 1989, the new operators decided to exercise an option in their deal with the Fair Board to lease an additional 13 acres so that the park could be expanded.

Kentucky Kingdom reopened on June 13, 1990, with an estimated 2,000 guests on the first day. While almost all the rides from the 1987 season had been sold, Starchaser, the park's then-sole roller coaster, had remained on-site, allowing Hart to reopen it. Additionally, new flat rides were added, including Blackbeard's Bounty, The Enterprise, Whirling Dervish (later renamed Breakdance), as well as Vampire, a Boomerang roller coaster, and Thunder Run, a wooden roller coaster. A new antique car ride, Tin Lizzies, reused the same track as the former car ride, Pontiac's Tin Lizzy Junction. New antique cars were added in 1995, having been previously used at Opryland USA in Tennessee. In 1991, the park opened Flying Dutchman, a spinning ride relocated from Kings Island in Ohio.

In late 1990, Kentucky Kingdom announced plans to build a water park, projected to open by summer of 1991 or spring of 1992. In 1991, the park revealed more details about the proposed water park, which by this point had been named Ocean Avenue. Plans noted that it would span six acres (2.43 ha), open in 1992, and require a separate admission cost of $4 to $6. Additionally, 1991 saw the opening of The Quake, the first Vekoma Waikiki Wave to open in North America. It was announced in October of the same year that all profits from the 1991 season would be invested into the water park's development. The water park's name was later changed to Ocean Paradise, and was changed for a final time to Hurricane Bay. Hurricane Bay opened in 1992 as an extension of the Kentucky Kingdom amusement park, with no separate admission fee required for entry. Other additions for the 1992 season included a $2.6 million, 150-foot-tall Ferris wheel called Giant Wheel. The following year, a new water slide complex opened in Hurricane Bay, featuring four different slides. In 1994, the park opened Mile High Falls, which, upon its opening, was the world's tallest shoot the chute water ride. The children's roller coaster Roller Skater was also added in 1994.

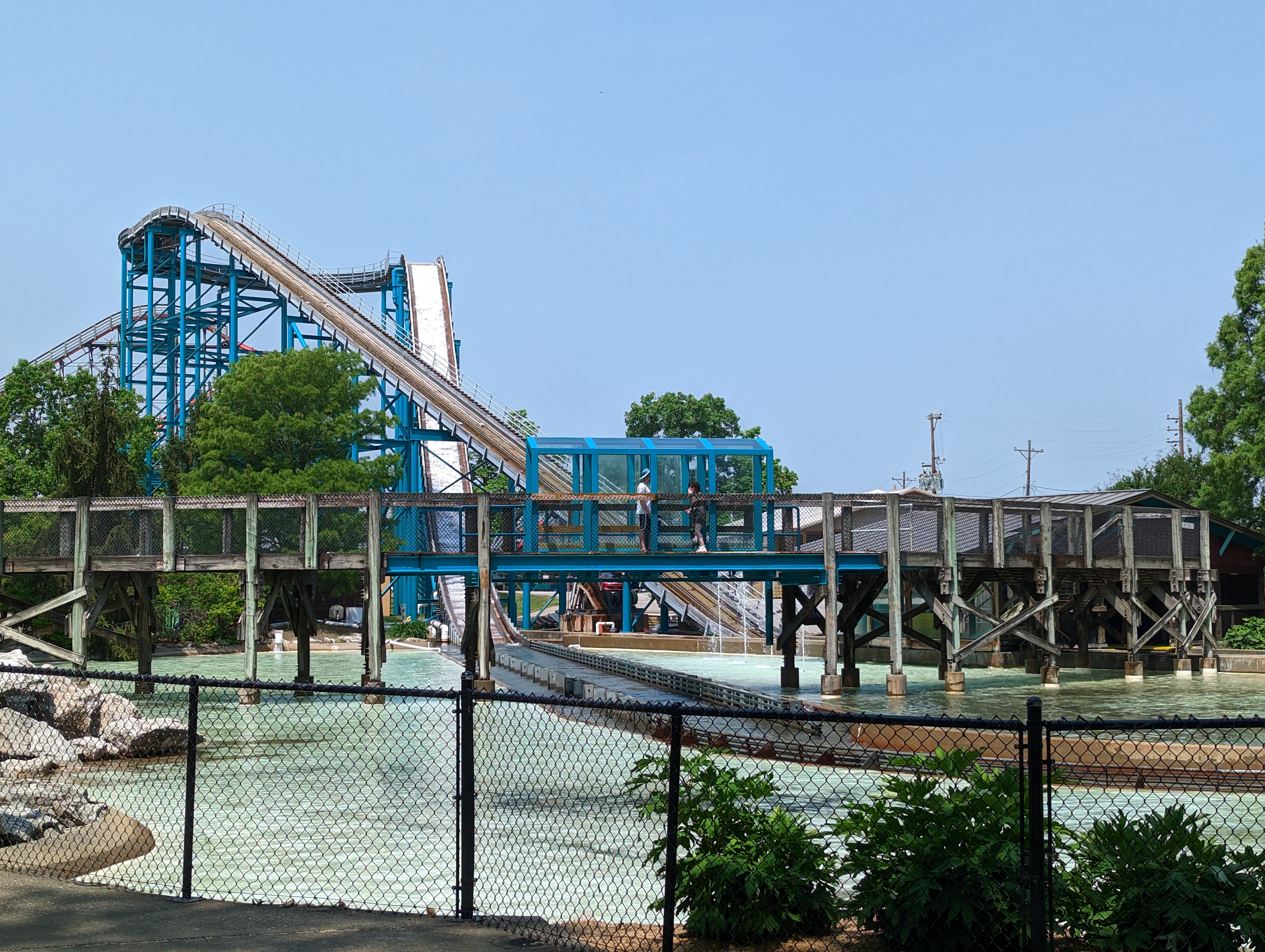
Upon its opening in 1994, Mile High Falls was the tallest shoot the chute ride in the world.

T2: Terror to the Second Power opened to the general public in April 1995. The ride was the first Vekoma Suspended Looping Coaster installation in North America, and only the second in the world. That same year, Hellevator, a 177-foot-tall (53.95 m) Intamin drop tower opened in October, just in time for the park's annual Halloween event, Halloscream. In 1996, an upcharge attraction, Top Eliminator Dragsters, debuted.

The park made its most expensive investment yet with the addition of Chang in 1997, a $12 million Bolliger & Mabillard stand-up coaster that, at the time, set world records for height, drop, length, speed, and inversions in stand-up coasters. Its 121 feet (37 m) vertical loop was the tallest in the world when it opened. A go-kart track, Thrill Karts (also known as Kingdom Go Carts), was also added in 1997 as an upcharge attraction. Park attendance increased from 130,000 guests in the 1990 season to 1.2 million guests in the 1997 season.

=== Acquisition by Six Flags ===
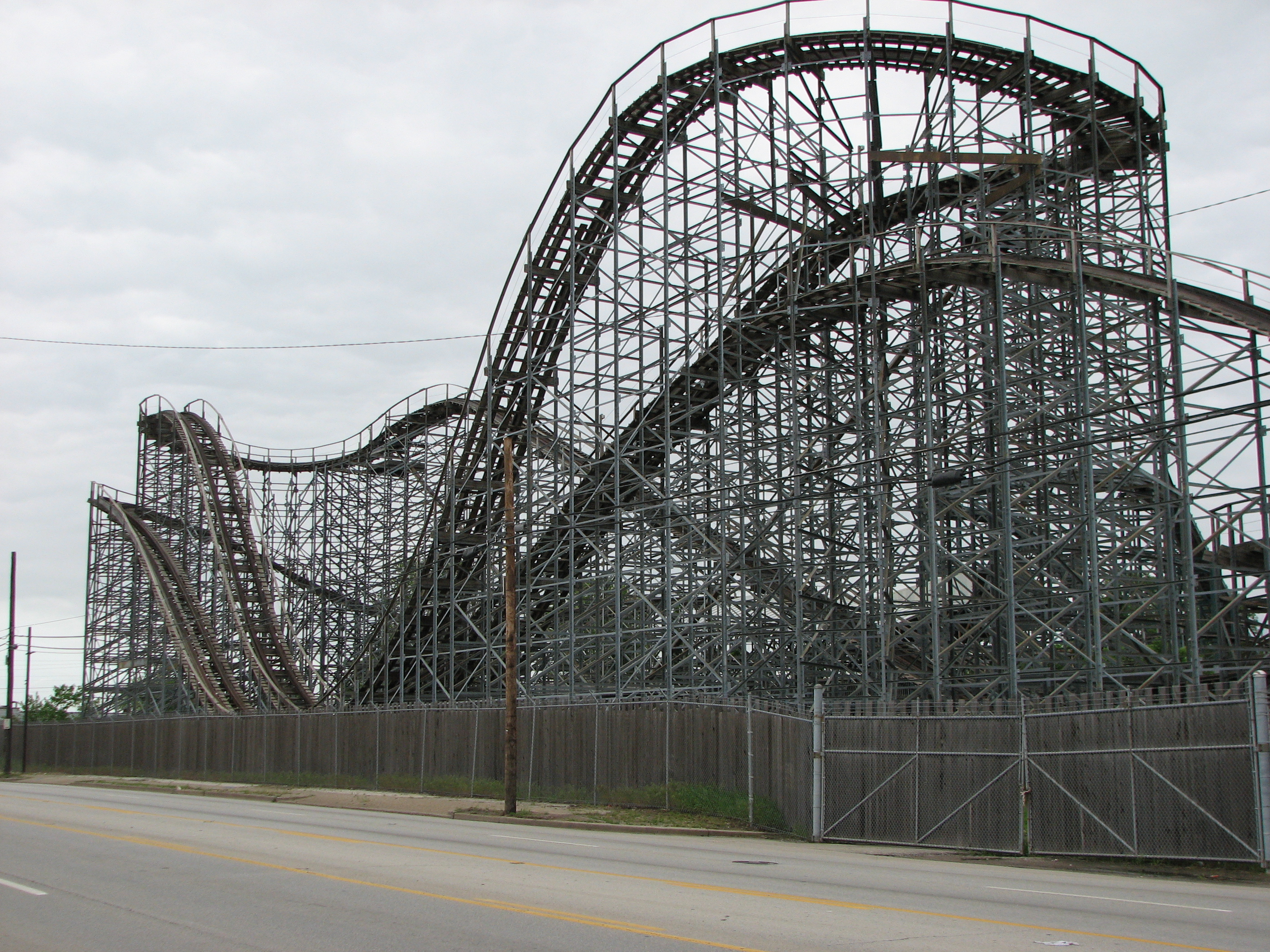
Twisted Twins, originally named Twisted Sisters, in 2009

In June 1997, Banc One Corporation completed its acquisition of Liberty National Bank and Trust, which held a major loan in Kentucky Kingdom. Although the park had never missed a payment, Banc One called the loan, forcing Hart to either raise more capital or sell the park's operating rights. Hart announced on September 26, 1997, that the rights to operate Kentucky Kingdom would be sold to Premier Parks for $64 million; the deal was finalized on November 7. As part of the agreement, Premier Parks agreed to continue opening new attractions at the park through at least 1999. At the time, Kentucky Kingdom was one of the most popular tourist attractions in Louisville, receiving more annual visitors than the Churchill Downs racetrack.

During the 1997–1998 off-season, Premier Parks acquired Six Flags from Time Warner, and as such, on June 21, 1998, the park reopened as Six Flags Kentucky Kingdom. It became the ninth amusement park to use the Six Flags name. Also on June 21, 1998, Twisted Sisters, a dueling wooden roller coaster, officially opened to the public. The ride cost $5 million, and had been planned by Themeparks LLC, who originally wanted to name it Double Trouble. Hook's Lagoon, an interactive tree house with water activities, was also added to Hurricane Bay.

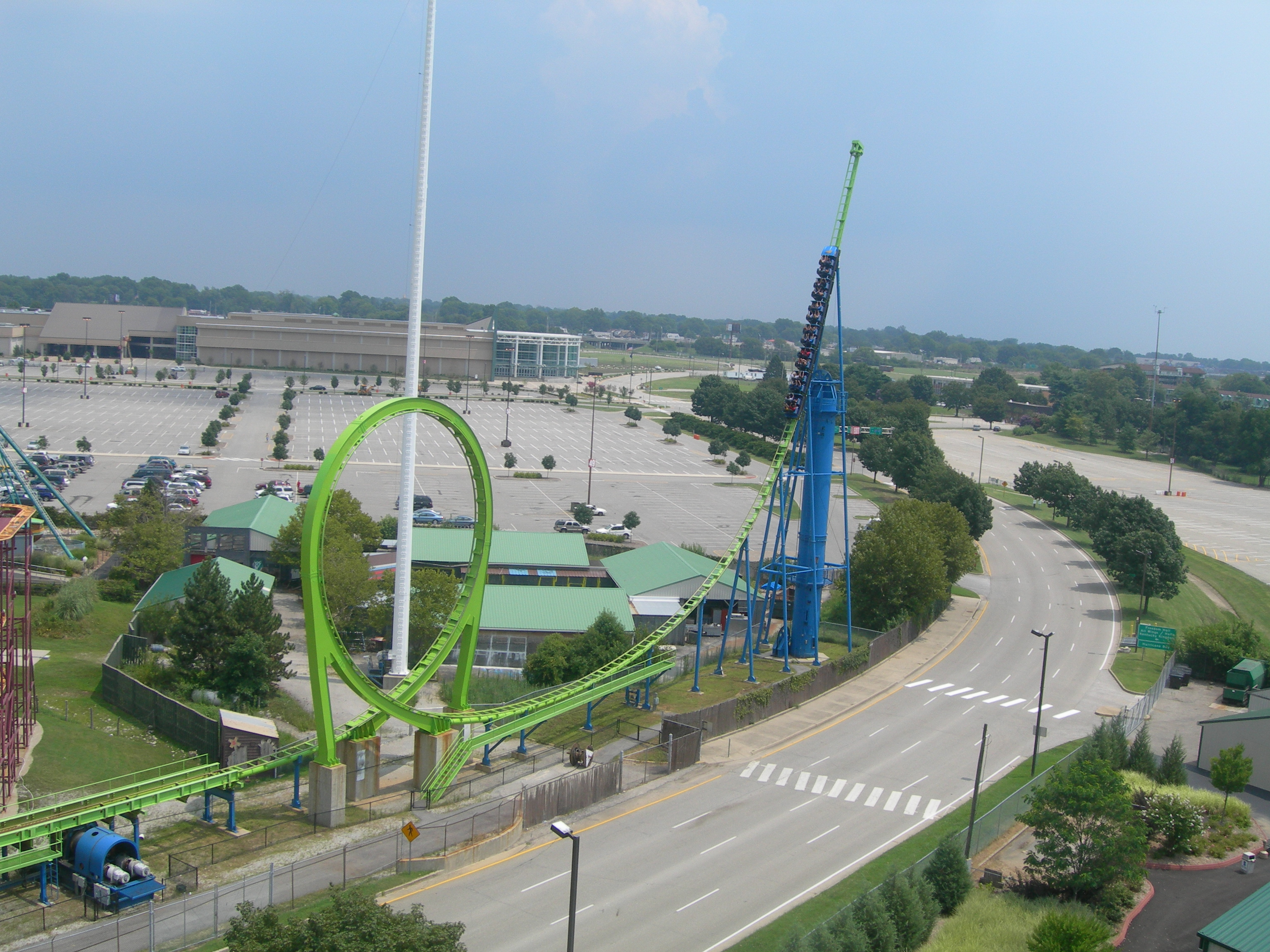
Greezed Lightnin' opened in 2003 after it was relocated from Six Flags Over Georgia

The Penguin's Blizzard River opened in 1999, using pumps and mechanisms from a river rapids ride known as Grizzly River Rampage, which had previously operated at Opryland USA and closed with the rest of the park in 1997. Six Flags then transformed King Louie's Playground into Looney Tunes Movie Town and added the Batman Stunt Show Spectacular. Also in 1999, Vampire was removed as a result of several malfunctions which had occurred earlier in the season. The ride would later reopen as Flashback at Six Flags New England in 2000. Kentucky Kingdom opened Road Runner Express, a wild mouse coaster, in 2000, and a Skycoaster one year later. Twisted Sisters was renamed to Twisted Twins in 2002 upon the threat of a lawsuit from the band Twisted Sister.

For the 2003 season, Kentucky Kingdom opened Greezed Lightnin', a Shuttle Loop roller coaster formerly located at Six Flags Over Georgia as Viper and Six Flags Great America as Tidal Wave. It was named after another Shuttle Loop coaster in the chain at the now-defunct Six Flags AstroWorld in Texas. The Quake was removed in 2004 due to malfunctions, and was replaced by a water attraction known as Tornado in 2005. In 2007, Hurricane Bay was renamed to Six Flags Splashwater Kingdom. Deluge, the first hydromagnetic water coaster, along with Buccaneer Beach, a water play area for young children, were added to the water park. Also, the Hellevator drop tower was rethemed to Superman: Tower of Power.

On June 21, 2007, a cable fracture occurred on Superman: Tower of Power while the ride was in operation, resulting in the sudden amputation of a 13-year-old girl's feet at the ankles. The accident spurred changes in inspection policies on other rides of the model across the country. On November 29, 2007, it was announced that Superman: Tower of Power would be removed. The park originally planned to replace the ride with a new attraction for the 2008 season, but this never occurred. Instead, Mega Wedgie, a new water slide, was added to Splashwater Kingdom in 2008. As a result of major debt in the Six Flags chain, the entire northwest section of the park, which included Twisted Twins, Mile High Falls, and the Zeppelin spinning ride, was completely closed for the remainder of Six Flags' operation of the park.

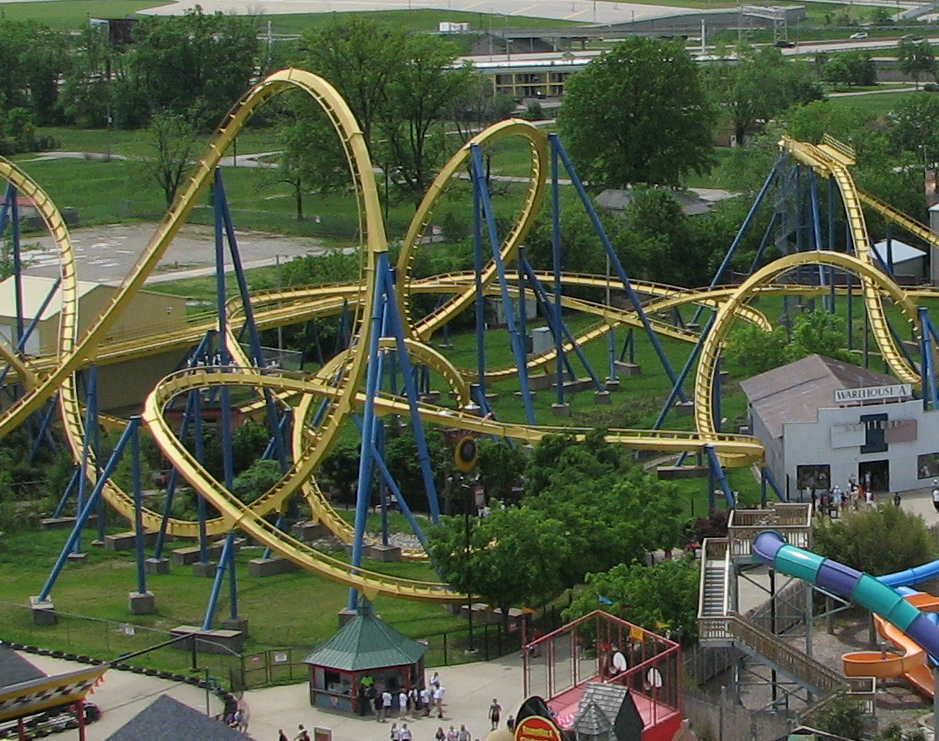
Chang in 2009 before it was relocated to Six Flags Great Adventure

On September 21, 2009, Kentucky Kingdom announced that Chang was being removed to make way for the addition of Bonzai Beach, a new water park area with a separate theme from the existing Splashwater Kingdom. Bonzai Beach was intended to have opened during the 2011 season to coincide with Six Flags' 50th anniversary. Chang was relocated to Six Flags Great Adventure in New Jersey, where it reopened in 2011 as Green Lantern.

==== Second closure ====
Amid a corporate bankruptcy, Six Flags announced on February 4, 2010, that Kentucky Kingdom and Splashwater Kingdom would cease operations immediately due to the rejection of an amended lease by the Kentucky State Fair Board. This left the Fair Board and Six Flags to negotiate the ownership of rides and attractions. In July 2010, this dispute was settled, with Six Flags keeping a ride of their choice (Road Runner Express), and the forgiveness of $2.8 million in lease-related payments owed by Six Flags in exchange for Six Flags' property rights (which included the offices, furniture, fixtures, and equipment relating to the park, and all intellectual property). The Kentucky State Fair Board also used $2.35 million from Ed Hart to purchase Six Flags' 20-acre (8.1 ha) stake in the park. Six Flags removed all of the Looney Tunes and DC Comics content from the park, along with inner tubes, overhead shaders from ride queues, and some parts from rides to use at its other parks. The Skycoaster was also removed, as it was leased, and the owner decided to take the ride elsewhere.

=== Proposals to reopen the park ===
Several companies approached the Fair Board with offers to reopen Kentucky Kingdom for the 2010 season. By May, Fair Board president Harold Workman stated the park would remain closed for the year, anticipating a 2011 reopening date. That same month, Ed Hart, along with several other investors, formed the Kentucky Kingdom Redevelopment Company. Their aim was to reopen the park by Memorial Day weekend the year after funding and plans were approved. On September 30, 2011, after 16 months of trying to get funding approved, the Kentucky Kingdom Redevelopment Company announced that the Fair Board had ended negotiations and that their company would no longer take part in reopening the park. Hart sued the state of Kentucky in an attempt to recoup $1.4 million that he claimed had been spent as part of the failed effort to reopen the amusement park.

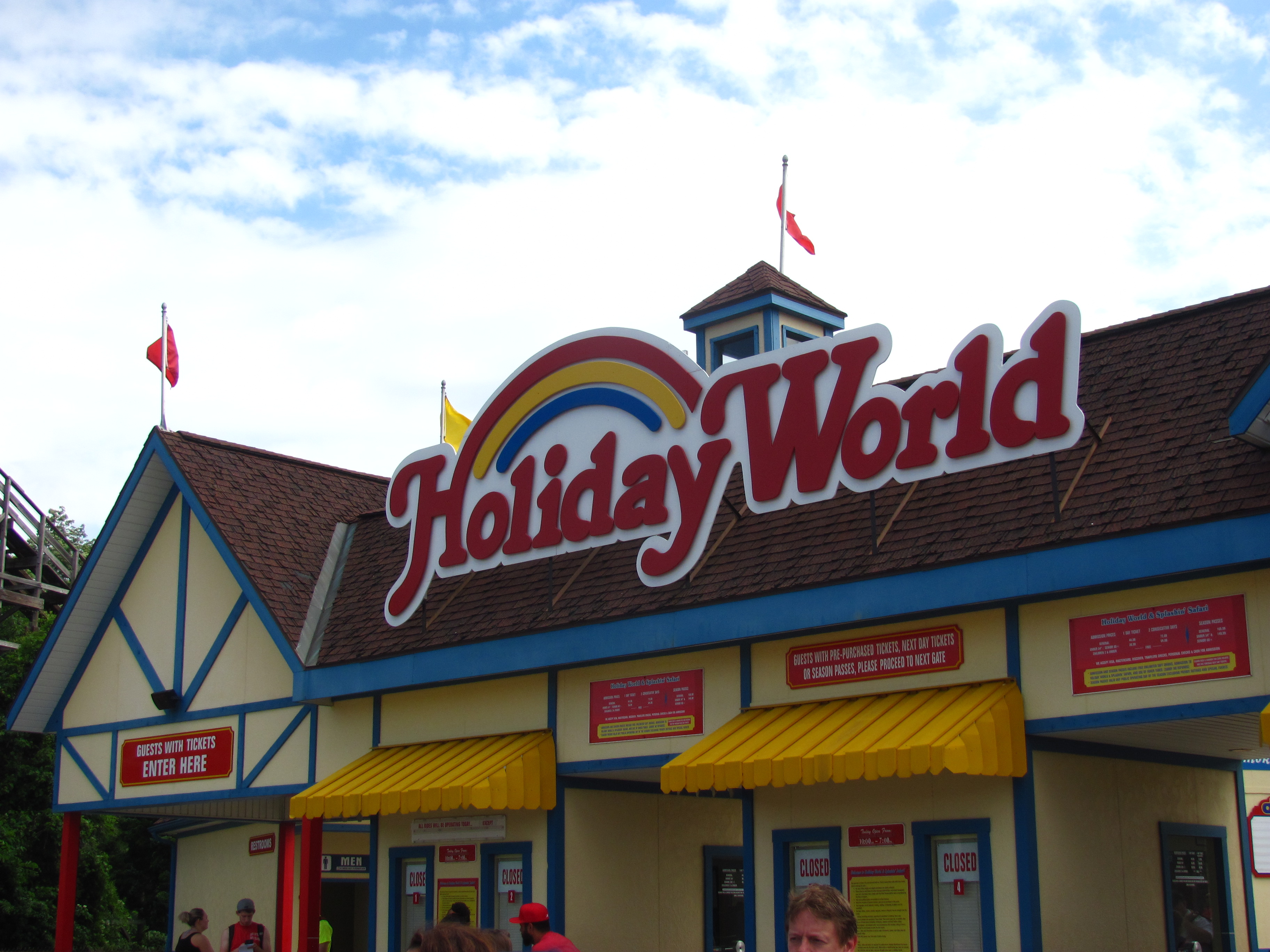
Holiday World & Splashin' Safari planned to reopen Kentucky Kingdom by 2013

On January 16, 2012, the Koch family, owners of Holiday World & Splashin' Safari in Indiana, announced they were involved in talks about the future of Kentucky Kingdom. Their media release stated they were in a fact-finding stage and hadn't made any decisions about whether to move forward in pursuing an opportunity to run the theme park. On February 7, four members of the Koch family formed a new company, Bluegrass Boardwalk, Incorporated, to negotiate a lease agreement with the Kentucky State Fair Board and to apply for economic development incentives from the Commonwealth of Kentucky. On February 23, the Kentucky State Fair Board approved a lease agreement for the former Kentucky Kingdom property to the Koch family. It was announced that Kentucky Kingdom would be renamed Bluegrass Boardwalk, reopen on May 11, 2013, and employ 25 full-time and 800 seasonal workers.

Later that month, the plans for the park's reopening began to unravel. On May 30, it was confirmed the park would not reopen in 2013. On June 15, it was announced that the Koch family would not reopen the park at all, with Bluegrass Boardwalk CEO Natalie Koch stating "many layers of governmental regulations and stipulations ultimately caused them to withdraw". Ed Hart criticized the Koch family for using Kentucky Kingdom as an opportunity to help their own park continue to thrive without nearby competition. The Kochs later disputed these comments.

=== Ed Hart's return and second reopening ===
Ed Hart and the Kentucky Kingdom Redevelopment Company announced in August 2012 that they would begin work to reopen the park in 2014. On October 19, Hart said the company planned to invest $120 million, using $50 million to reopen the park and investing another $70 million over the term of the lease. All rides were slated to reopen with the exception of Greezed Lightnin', which was too costly to repair and reopen. The company also planned to add a $15 million roller coaster, install three new rides, and double the size of the Hurricane Bay water park. The planned expansion would be the largest in the park's history.

In January 2013, the Kentucky Fair Board granted preliminary approval for a lease, and the Kentucky Tourism Development Finance Authority (KTDFA) approved government incentives in support of reopening the park, placing Hart and his investors in charge of park operations. The scheduled opening date was announced to be May 24, 2014. On March 25, Hart specified that it would take more money than previously anticipated to rebuild and expand the park. The investment plan previously approved under the terms of the lease consisted of $20 million in partner equity and $25 million in borrowed money. The city planned to provide subsidies and tax incentives up to $200,000 per year for the first five years and $100,000 per year for the following five years. Hart was able to secure $28.5 million in financing, and proprietors would be under contract obligation to invest at least $1 million per year on park upgrades. On April 10, KTDFA approved up to $10 million in sales tax rebates over the next ten years for Kentucky Kingdom.

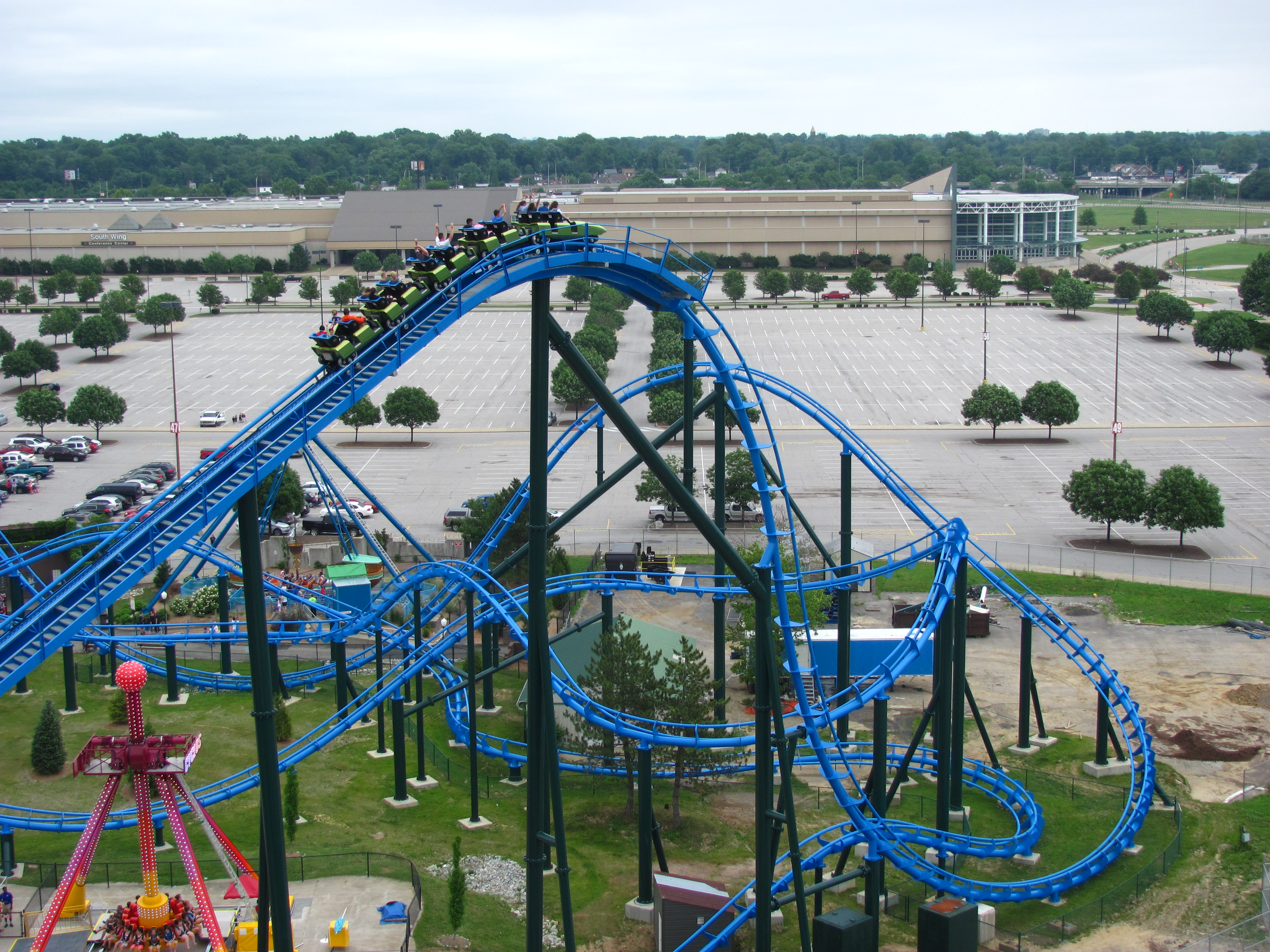
Lightning Run, added in 2014, is the only operating Hyper GT-X model roller coaster in the world

Construction began in July 2013. The park added a new $7 million Chance Rides roller coaster named Lightning Run, three new children's rides in King Louie's Playland (restored to its previous name after being known as Looney Tunes Movie Town during the Six Flags era), a new drop tower named FearFall, a new spinning ride named Professor John's Flying Machines, and several new attractions in Hurricane Bay. Kentucky Kingdom and Hurricane Bay reopened on May 24, 2014.

After the first month of operation, over 100,000 season passes were sold, and by the end of the season, 600,000 guests had visited the park. Kentucky Kingdom announced plans to open a renovated amphitheater in 2015. On September 25, 2014, Cyclos and Skycatcher were announced for 2015, along with three refurbished attractions: The Enterprise, Raging Rapids River Ride, and T3 (formerly T2: Terror to the Second Power). On January 16, 2015, Kentucky Kingdom announced the park would add three more rides, calling the total group of eight new rides the Kingdom Eight. The three new for 2015 rides were Up Up and Away, Flutterfly, and The Wizard of Oz.

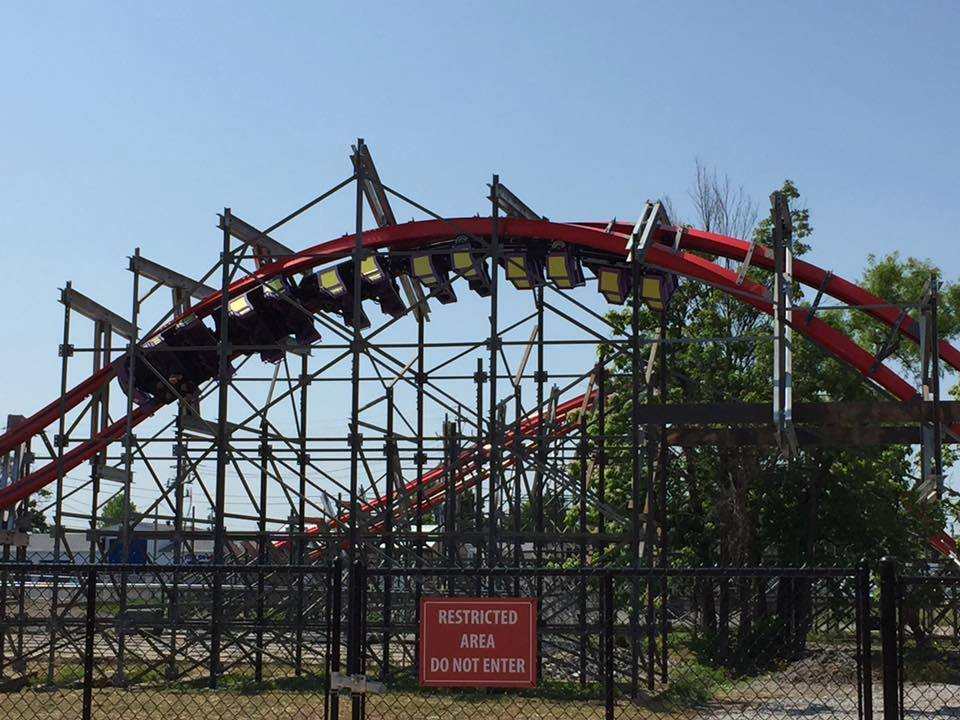
Storm Chaser, added in 2016, reused some of the support structure from Twisted Twins

On July 20, 2015, Kentucky Kingdom officials announced that the park would open a new roller coaster called Storm Chaser for the 2016 season. Storm Chaser would utilize part of Twisted Twins' existing structure, which had sat standing but not operating since the end of the 2007 season. The ride was converted from wooden to steel by Rocky Mountain Construction. Storm Chaser opened to the public on April 30, 2016.

For the 2017 season, Kentucky Kingdom announced Eye of the Storm, a Fire Ball ride. Additionally, Thunder Run received a new train, as well as modifications to its track, at a cost of around $500,000. Other planned upgrades to the park included the installation of more shade in ride queues, additional locker room space, and upgraded air conditioning in the park's restroom and dining areas. Several infrastructure improvements were made to the park's sitting areas and entrance. Additional improvements included a new entrance to Hurricane Bay and more children's rides.

2017 was a record season, drawing more than 9,000 visitors a day during the summer peak. For the 2018 season, Scream Xtreme, a Zamperla Endeavour, replaced The Enterprise. Rock 'n' Roller, a small Himalaya ride, was also added. A double feature played in the 5-D Cinema, along with improved infrastructure in Hurricane Bay.

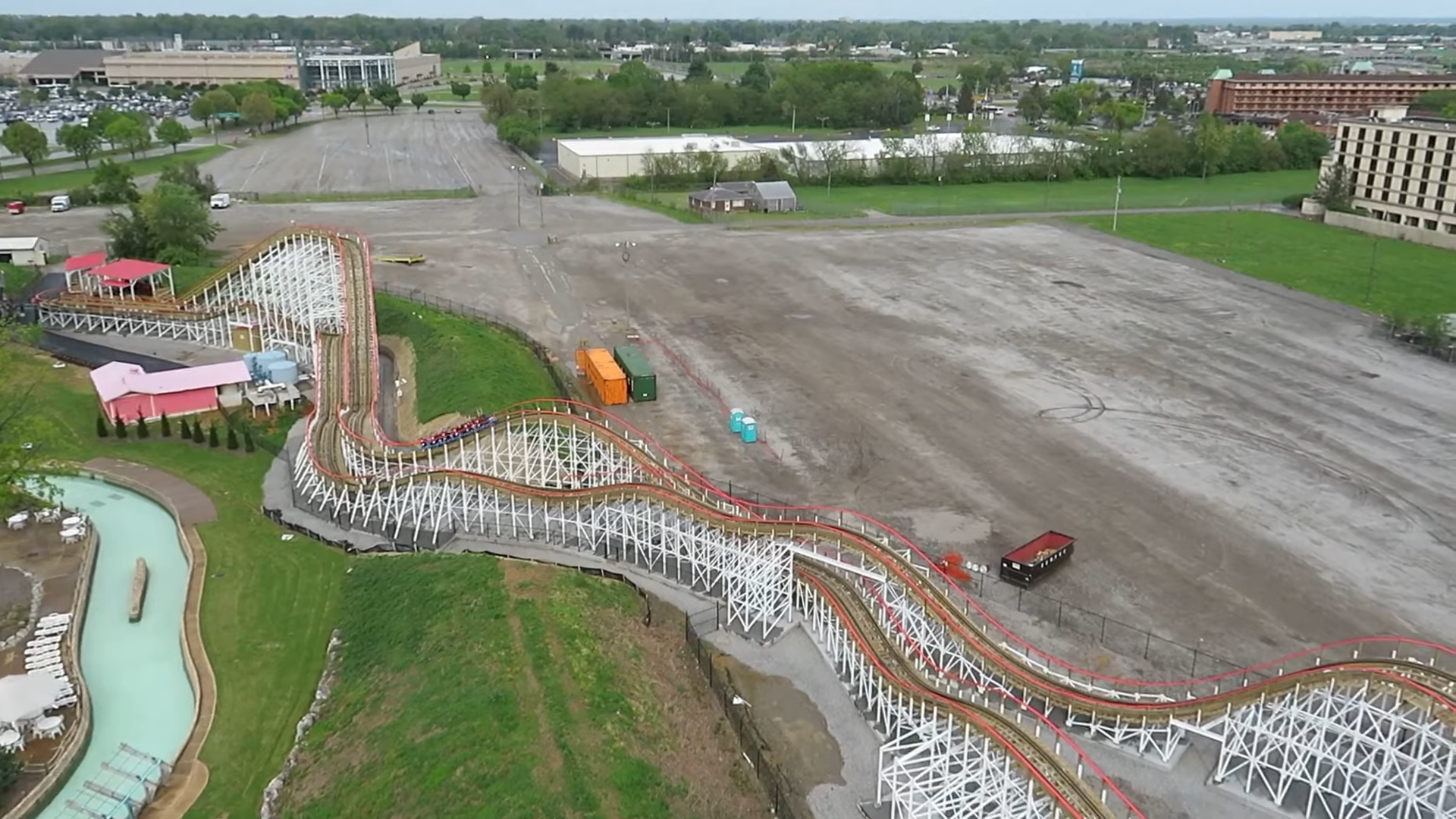
Kentucky Flyer, added in 2019, uses wooden track on a steel support structure

To celebrate the fifth anniversary of the park's reopening, the Kentucky Flyer family wooden coaster was added for the 2019 season. Kentucky Flyer was manufactured by The Gravity Group. The coaster's construction was almost cancelled in late 2018, when on October 16, the Kentucky State Fair Board wouldn't allow the park to use half an acre of 20-acre expansion land, which was promised in the park's lease. The Fair Board claimed they weren't able to allow the park to use the land because expansion of the park involved talks with several landlord parties. Hart claimed that construction was halted due to an ongoing lawsuit that the park filed against the Fair Board because of the Fair Board's breaking of a paid parking lease. He also claimed that the Fair Board halted the progress of the ride in an attempt to force the park to drop the lawsuit. On October 17, following the involvement of governor Matt Bevin, Kentucky Kingdom was granted permission to use the land, and the roller coaster's construction continued.

In June 2019, Hart announced that HalloScream, the park's former Halloween event, would return in October 2019 to celebrate Kentucky Kingdom's 30th anniversary. Kentucky Kingdom had not held a Halloween event at the park in ten years. The park employed a Louisville-based company, Oak Island Creative, to produce HalloScream. In response to the COVID-19 pandemic, Kentucky Kingdom delayed its opening date for the 2020 season to early June instead of late April, as originally scheduled. It was also announced that for the 2020 season, Kentucky Kingdom and Hurricane Bay would extend their operating hours. Kentucky Kingdom reopened on June 29 with new safety protocols and reduced admission prices.

=== Acquisition by Herschend ===
At a February 2021 press conference, it was formally announced that Herschend would become the new majority partner and operator of Kentucky Kingdom. Craig Ross, longtime former president of Dollywood in Tennessee, was appointed as Kentucky Kingdom's general manager. For the 2021 season, the park opened Bluegrass Bakery, which sold Herschend's signature cinnamon bread. Ross stepped down as general manager at the end of the 2021 season to assume a new role as the park's president, with Sarah Worrell succeeding him as general manager. In 2025, Herschend rethemed an area of the park, calling it Discovery Meadow. This retheme included three new rides and prompted the renaming of several previously existing rides, including Storm Chaser to Wind Chaser and Thunder Run to Woodland Run. On May 28, 2026, the park opened its sixth roller coaster, Flying Fox, a $14 million custom Vekoma Suspended Family Coaster. On October 29, 2026, the park teased the addition of a new ride on Instagram. It was officially revealed on November 5 that the new ride is the world's largest enclosed wooden roller coaster, and is called Midnight Showdown. This also came with the announcement of two new themed areas, and the retheming of several rides within the park to match these new areas.

== List of attractions ==
=== Roller coasters ===
Ride	Picture	Opened	Manufacturer	Type	Notes
Flying Fox		2026	Vekoma	Steel inverted roller coaster (Suspended Family Coaster)	A $14 million custom family coaster themed to Jeb Fox, a fictional crop dusting pilot
Hollyhock and Roll Previously Roller Skater (1994–2024)		1994	Vekoma	Steel children's roller coaster (Vekoma Junior Coaster)	A children's roller coaster themed to plants
Kentucky Flyer		2019	The Gravity Group	Wooden hybrid roller coaster	A family roller coaster themed to planes
Midnight Showdown		Under construction, opening 2027	The Gravity Group	Enclosed hybrid wooden roller coaster	The world's largest enclosed wooden roller coaster
Stampede Run Previously Lightning Run (2014–2026)		2014	Chance Rides	Steel roller coaster (Hyper GT-X)	The only ride of its model in the world
Wind Chaser Previously Storm Chaser (2016–2024), Twisted Twins (2002–2007), and Twisted Sisters (1998–2001)		2016 1998	Rocky Mountain Construction Custom Coasters International	Steel hybrid roller coaster	Reconstructed from components of the former Twisted Twins dueling wooden coaster. Uses I-Box track. Themed to owls.
Woodland Run Previously Thunder Run (1990–2024)		1990	Dinn Corporation	Wooden roller coaster	A wooden roller coaster designed by Curtis D. Summers and John Fetterman. Themed to deer.

=== Thrill rides ===
Ride	Opened	Manufacturer	Type	Notes
Himalaya	Between 1993 and 1998	Reverchon Industries	Music Express	
Seed Spinner Previously Breakdance (1990–2024)	1990	HUSS Park Attractions	Breakdance	Relocated within the park in 2025
Skycatcher	2015	Funtime	Swing ride (StarFlyer)	
Treetop Drop Previously FearFALL (2014–2024)	2014	Larson International	Drop tower (Super Shot)	129 feet (39 m) tall. Relocated within the park in 2025.
Whirlwind Previously Scream Extreme (2018–2026)	2018	Zamperla	Endeavour	Replaced The Enterprise

=== Family attractions ===
Ride	Opened	Manufacturer	Type	Notes
Bumper Derby Previously Bumper Cars (2014–2026)	2014	Soli	Bumper cars	
Country Cruisers Previously Tin Lizzies Starlight Speedway (1990–2026)	1990	Arrow Dynamics	Antique cars	Previously located at Opryland USA
Cumberland Express	2025	Zamperla	Train	
Garden Carousel Previously International Carousel (1996–2009) and Bella Musica (2014–2024)	1996	Wooddesign Amusement-Rides	Carousel	
Giant Wheel	1992	Vekoma	Ferris wheel	150 feet (46 m) tall
Happy Hollow	2025	N/A	Playground	
Honeybee Buzzers Previously Professor John's Flying Machines (2014–2024)	2014	Larson International	Flying Scooters	Relocated within the park in 2025.
Nature's Bounty Previously Bluebeard's Bounty (1990–2024)	1990	HUSS Park Attractions	Pirate ship	Relocated within the park in 2025.
Spring Fling Previously Flying Dutchman (1991–2024)	1991	Intamin	Swing ride	Previously located at Kings Island from 1973 to 1990. Known as Elf Flyer during the park's Christmas event.

=== Water rides ===
Ride	Opened	Manufacturer	Type	Notes
Mile High Falls	1994	Hopkins Rides	Shoot the chute	Opened as the tallest shoot the chute ride in the world with a drop of 90 feet (27 m)

=== Children's rides ===
Ride	Opened	Manufacturer	Type	Notes
Dragonfly Drop Previously Tweety and Sylvester's Pounce and Bounce (2000–2009) and Pounce & Bounce (2014–2024)	2000	Zamperla	Jumpin' Star	Relocated within the park in 2025
Flutterfly	2015	Zamperla	Magic Bikes	
Friendly Frogs Previously Jump Around (2014–2026)	2014	Zamperla	Jump Around	
Harvest Swing Previously Whirl Around Swings (2014–2026)	2014	Zamperla	Swing ride	
Jolly Juleps Previously Mad Hatter (2014–2026)	2014	Zamperla	Teacups (Midi Tea Cups)	
Loopy Lambs Previously Speedway and Rowdy Racers (unknown–2026)	1998	Zamperla	Speedway	Relocated within the park in 2016 and 2022
My Old Kentucky Carousel Previously Bugs Bunny's Big Band Carousel and Musical Carousel (unknown–2026)	1990	Zamperla	Mini Carousel	Will be relocated within the park for 2027
Pig Pen Escape Previously Bigfoot Trucks (1990-2026)	1990	Zamperla	Convoy	
Porch Swing Previously Rock-A-Bye Swing (2014–2026)	2014	Zamperla	Happy Swing	
Redbird Racer	2025	Zamperla	Flying Tigers	
Scout's Squirrel Race	2025	Zamperla	Jump Around	
Soaring Silks Previously Zeppelin (1991–2026)	1991	Zamperla	Zeppelin	Relocated within the park in 2014 and 2027
Up Up and Away	2015	Zamperla	Balloon Race (Samba Tower)	

=== Hurricane Bay ===
Ride	Opened	Manufacturer	Type	Notes
Adventure River	2014	Water Technology	Lazy river	
Big Surf	1992	WhiteWater West	Wave pool	750,000-U.S.-gallon (2,800,000 L) wave pool
Buccaneer Beach	2014	SCS Inc.	Children's water play area	
Castaway Creek Previously Caribbean Cruise	1993	Water Technology	Lazy river	
Deep Water Dive	2014	ProSlide Technology	Drop body water slide	Part of the Speed Slide Complex. Features a 121-foot (37 m) drop.
Family Wave Lagoon	2014	WhiteWater West	Wave pool	12,000-square-foot (1,100 m^{2}) wave pool
Mega Wedgie	2008	ProSlide Technology	Bowl water slide	Last ride added by Six Flags
Mt. Slide Hai	1993	WhiteWater West	Water slide complex	Contains four slides named Voodoo Express, Forbidden Passage, Conquistador Canyon, and Vanishing Falls
Plummet Summit	2014	ProSlide Technology	Water slide	52 feet (16 m) tall
Splash Zone Previously Hook's Lagoon	1998	SCS Interactive	Children's water play area	
Tornado	2005	ProSlide Technology	Water slide	Replaced The Quake
Wave Runner	2014	ProSlide Technology	Mat water slide	Part of the Speed Slide Complex. Features a 66-foot (20 m) drop.
Wikiwiki Wai	2014	ProSlide Technology	Water slide complex	Contains three slides named Calypso Run, Waikiki Wipe Out, and Kilawaya

== Other attractions ==
=== Seasonal events ===
==== Pumpkins at Kentucky Kingdom ====
Pumpkins at Kentucky Kingdom is a Halloween event at the park that operates from Thursdays through Sundays during October. It is a family-oriented event that features themed displays, pumpkin sculptures, trick-or-treating, mazes, live shows, dance parties, and most of Kentucky Kingdom's regular attractions. The event debuted in 2022 and was the park's first seasonal event hosted by Herschend.

==== Christmas at Kentucky Kingdom ====
Christmas at Kentucky Kingdom is an annual Christmas event that operates from November to January. The event debuted in 2024 with over one million Christmas lights and other seasonal decorations. During the event, the park is divided into four sections: Classic Christmas, Holly Jolly Junction, Santa's Village, and Snow Zone. Snow Zone includes Blizzard Bluff, a 175-foot-long (53 m) long snow tubing hill, the largest of its kind in Kentucky. The event also features live performances from musical groups and costumed characters.

=== Kentucky Kingdom Gardens ===
Kentucky Kingdom Gardens, the park's horticulture department, has a year-round greenhouse that grows more than 20 cultivars of annuals, more than 100 different species of perennials and ornamental grasses, and various specimen coniferous and deciduous trees. In 2016, the park introduced plant labels, which provided the plant names, and a QR code that would give more information about the plants.

=== Restaurants and catering ===
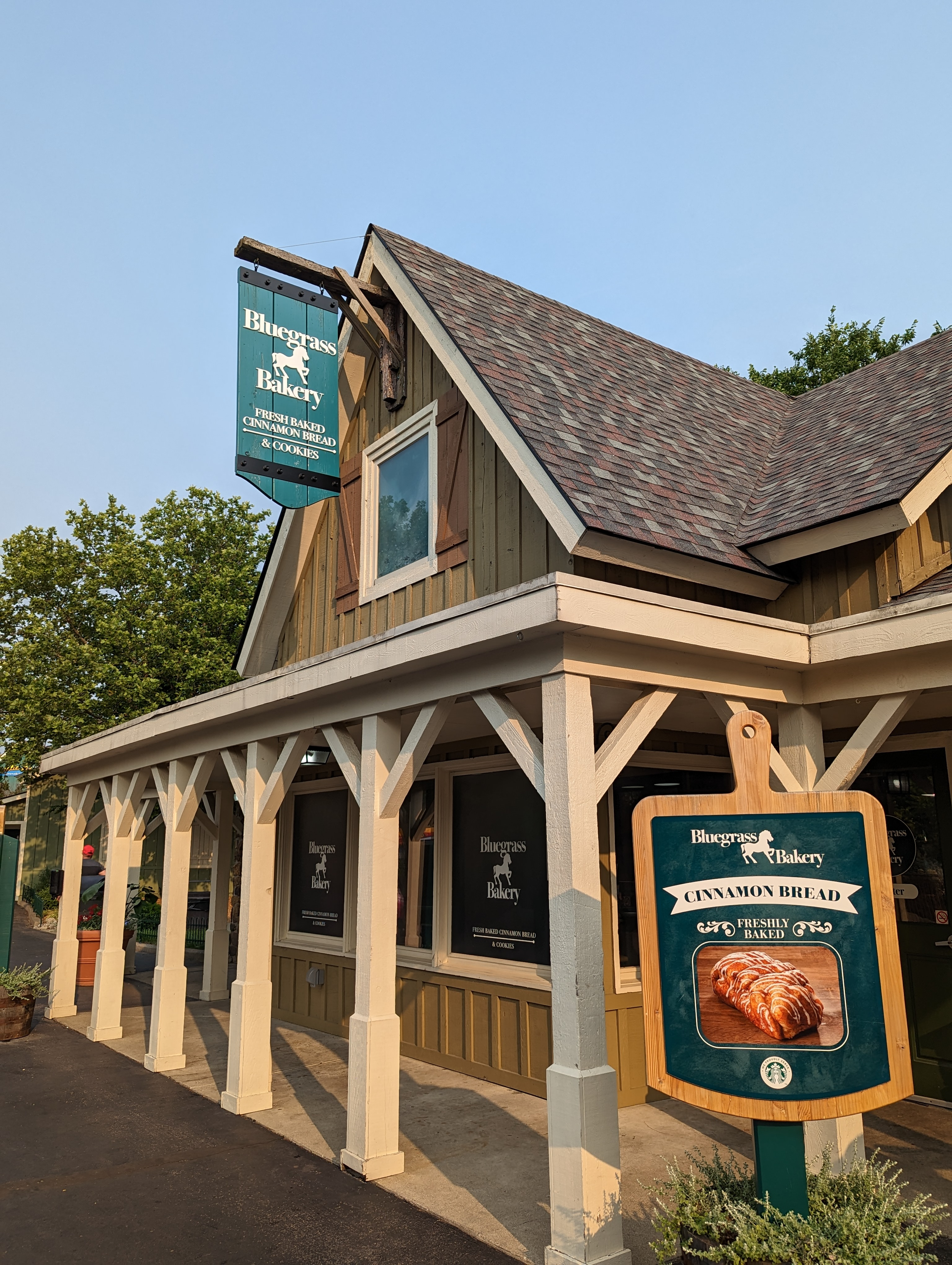
Bluegrass Bakery, one of the park's eateries, in 2023

Kentucky Kingdom has a total of 30 restaurants and food stands across the park. On March 30, 2006, Six Flags and Papa John's formed a multi-year marketing alliance, which allowed Papa John's to open restaurants in the park. Kentucky Kingdom prepares more than 50,000 catered meals every season, and up to 5,000 meals per day.

== Incidents ==
=== Starchaser ===
On July 26, 1994, two cars collided on the Starchaser roller coaster after a ride operator allowed them to traverse the ride too close together. The accident resulted in the hospitalization of seven-year-old Mary Noonan, who had serious injuries, including a lacerated liver. A reporter for WHAS-TV falsely claimed that the ride had malfunctioned and that unnamed state inspectors had pronounced the indoor roller coaster unsafe. WHAS-TV reported inaccurately on the accident in July 1994 and again in May 1996, which led to Ed Hart suing the station for its reporting, claiming that they were responsible for a profit loss of $800,000. In March 1998, the jury ruled in favor of Kentucky Kingdom, awarding the park $3.975 million. The case was appealed several times after the 1998 ruling, until June 2006, when WHAS-TV abandoned the appeals process and paid Themeparks LLC $7.4 million.

=== Superman: Tower of Power ===
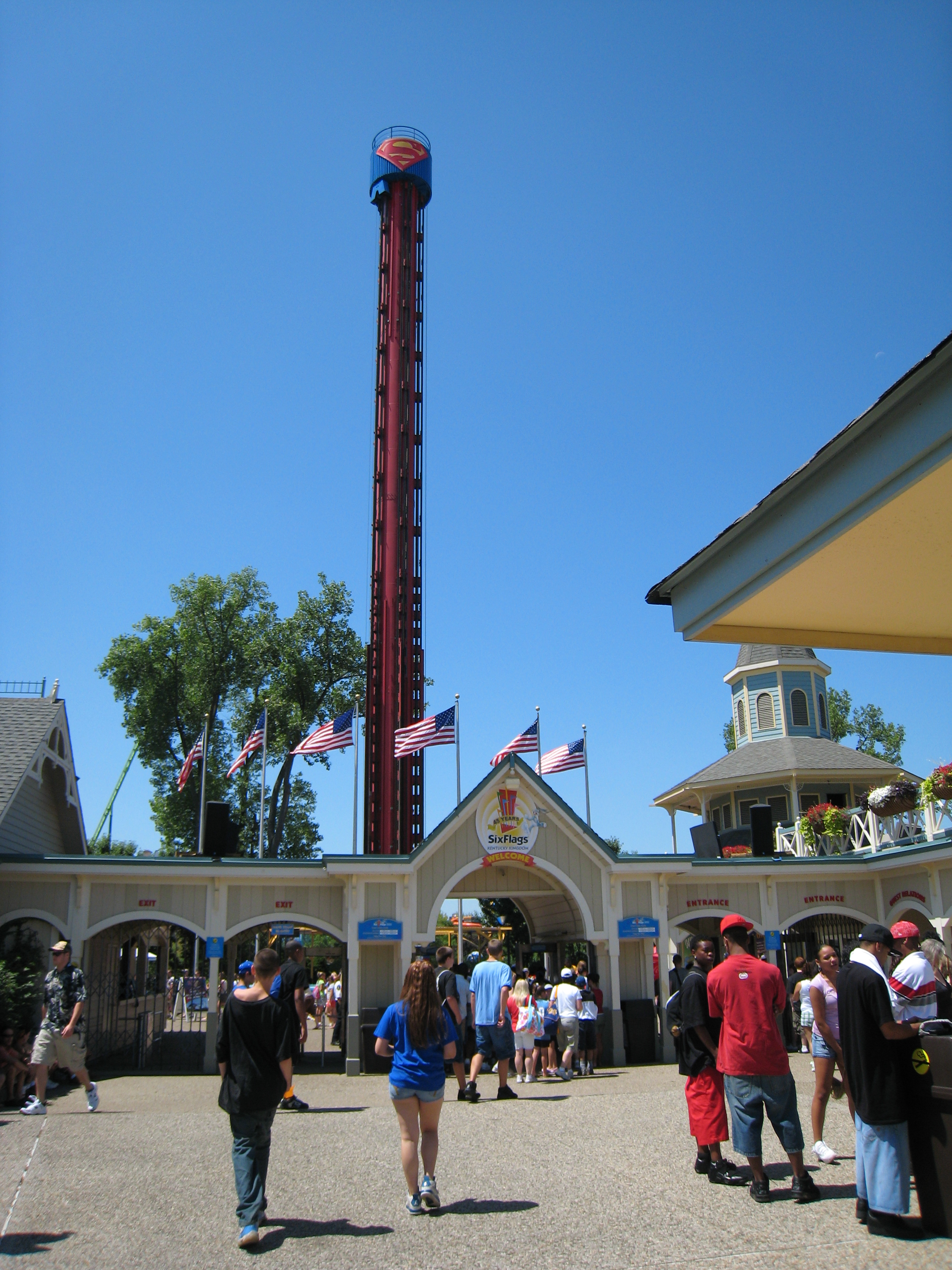
Superman: Tower of Power on June 9, 2007

On June 21, 2007, a 13-year-old girl was severely injured on Superman: Tower of Power when a cable, which snapped shortly after the ride cycle began, became entangled around her feet during the drop, shattering her left femur and amputating both feet below the ankles. Her right foot was later successfully reattached, but amputation below the knee was required on the left leg. Following the incident, other drop towers of the same model around the country were temporarily closed for inspection. Superman: Tower of Power, however, never reopened and was dismantled the following year.

== See also ==
- Herschend, Kentucky Kingdom's operator from 2021 to present
- Themeparks LLC, Kentucky Kingdom's operator from 1990 to 1997 and 2014 to 2020
- Six Flags, Kentucky Kingdom's operator from 1998 to 2009
- List of attractions and events in the Louisville metropolitan area
