= Garuda Glide =

Roller coaster at Wonderla

- Previously known as T2: Terror to the Second Power (1995–2014) and T3 (2015–2022) at Kentucky Kingdom
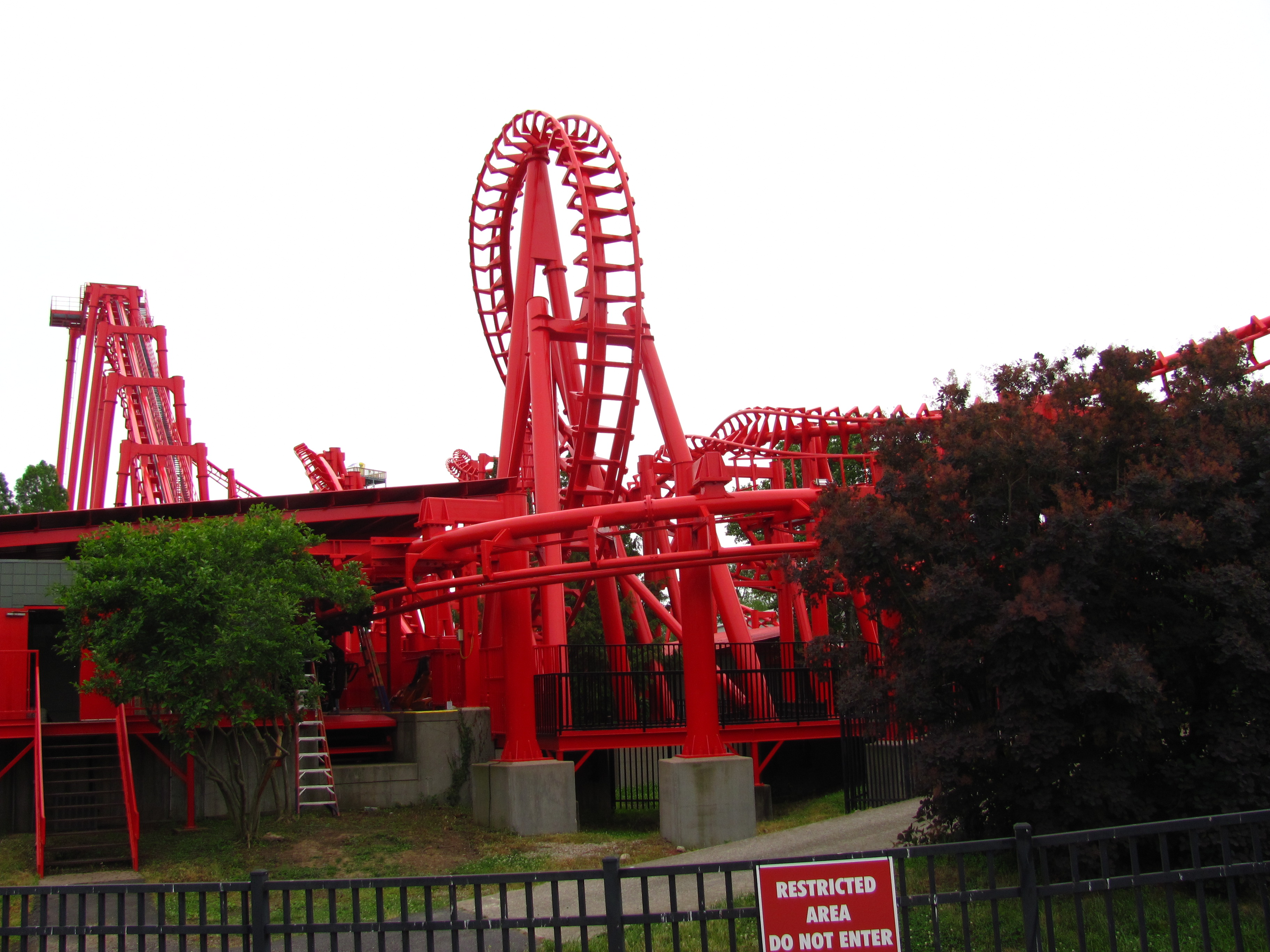
- T3 at Kentucky Kingdom

Wonderla
- Coordinates: 12.832375°N 77.399975°E
- Status: Operating
- Opening date: April 10, 2026

Kentucky Kingdom
- Coordinates: 38.194136°N 85.747009°W
- Status: Removed
- Opening date: April 7, 1995
- Closing date: September 5, 2022
- Garuda Glide at Kentucky Kingdom at RCDB

General statistics
- Type: Steel – Inverted
- Manufacturer: Vekoma
- Model: SLC (662m Prototype)
- Lift/launch system: Chain lift hill
- Height: 101.7 ft (31.0 m)
- Length: 2,171.9 ft (662.0 m)
- Speed: 49.7 mph (80.0 km/h)
- Inversions: 5
- Duration: 1:36
- Capacity: 900 riders per hour
- Height restriction: 52–79 in (132–201 cm)
- Trains: 2 trains with 7 cars; riders arranged 2 across in a single row for a total of 14 riders per train
- Garuda Glide at RCDB

Garuda Glide is an inverted roller coaster located at Wonderla in Bengaluru, Karnataka, India. The coaster is a Suspended Looping Coaster model manufactured by Vekoma, and it originally opened at Kentucky Kingdom in Louisville, Kentucky as T2: Terror to the Second Power (or simply T2) on April 7, 1995. Following the amusement park's closure in 2009 due to disagreements between its owner and operator, the ride sat idle for several years. Under new park ownership, the roller coaster was refurbished and renamed T3 in 2015. The coaster operated through the 2022 season before it was dismantled and sold to Wonderla in 2024.

== History ==
The concept to add inversions to the inverted roller coaster was first developed by Jim Wintrode, general manager of Six Flags Great America, in the 1990s. Wintrode worked with Swiss roller coaster manufacturer Bolliger & Mabillard to develop Batman: The Ride, which opened at Six Flags Great America in 1992. Dutch amusement ride manufacturer Vekoma developed a similar concept shortly after, and named their model Suspended Looping Coaster (SLC). Their first installation was El Condor at Walibi Holland in 1994.

In 1995, nine parks around the world announced plans to add Vekoma SLCs, including Kentucky Kingdom. On December 1, 1994, Kentucky Kingdom announced that they would be opening an SLC named T2: Terror to the Second Power. It was identical to the original prototype at Walibi Holland, but featured a different color scheme. T2 opened on April 7, 1995.

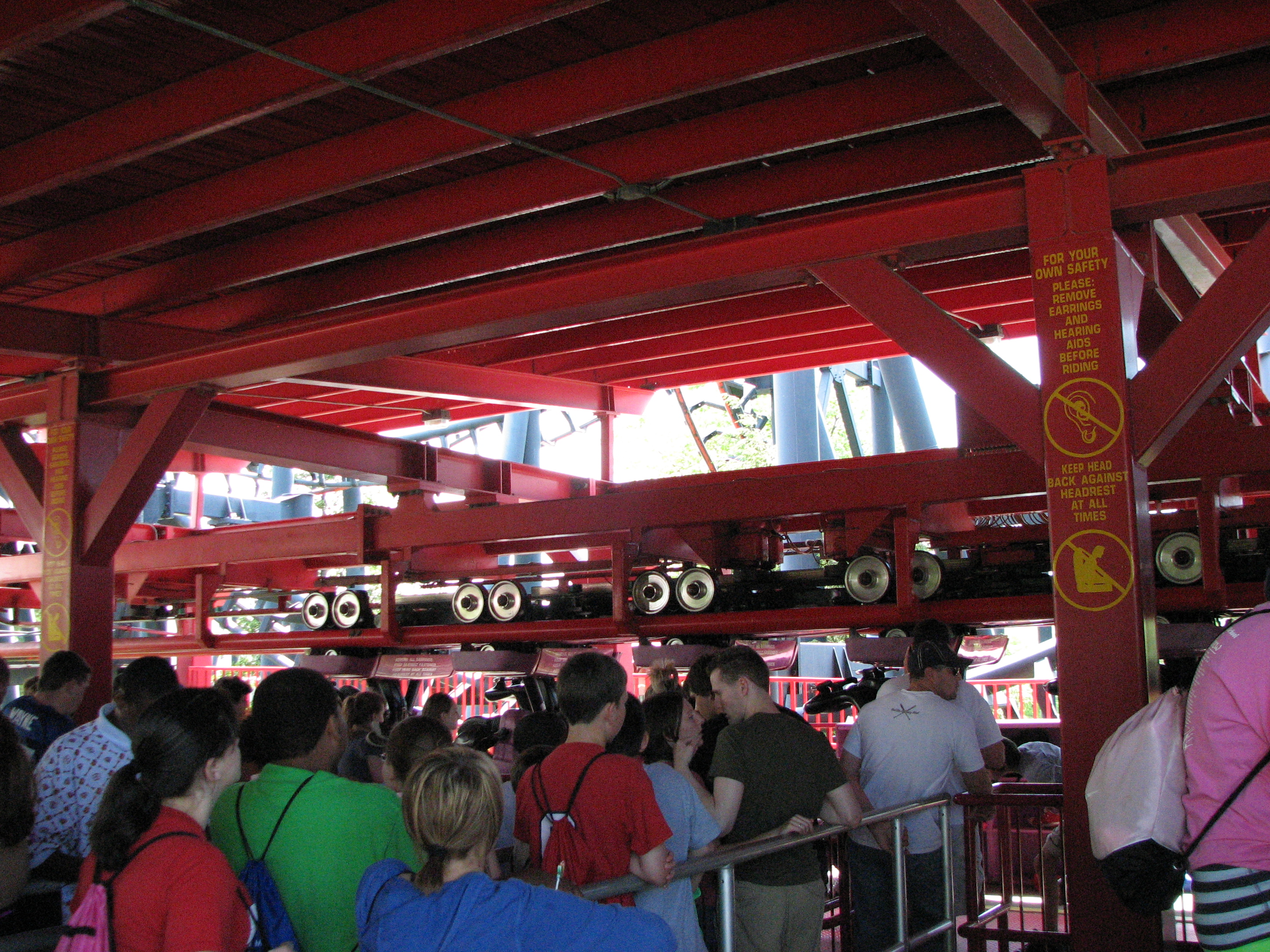
T2's station remained red following the transition to the black color scheme.

At the end of 1997, the rights to operate Kentucky Kingdom were sold to Premier Parks for $64 million. Following the acquisition, Batman and DC Comics themes were added to Kentucky Kingdom. In 1999, T2 was painted black, as Six Flags (which had since become the name of Premier Parks) planned to retheme part of the park as Gotham City, and rebrand T2 as Batman: The Ride, as well as neighboring coaster, Chang, to Riddler's Revenge. However, these plans never came to fruition, though T2 retained its new coat of black paint.

Amid a corporate bankruptcy on February 4, 2010, Six Flags announced the park would cease operations immediately due to the rejection of an amended lease by the park's owner, the Kentucky State Fair Board. Under the efforts of former Kentucky Kingdom operator Ed Hart and several investors, the Kentucky Kingdom Redevelopment Company was formed to redevelop the park and reopen it. On February 23, 2012, the Kentucky State Fair Board approved a lease agreement which would see the park reopen as Bluegrass Boardwalk. The plans called for the removal of T2, along with Twisted Twins, due to age and safety concerns. However, plans soon unraveled, and several heads involved with the plan withdrew from the investment, canceling it.

On June 27, 2013, Ed Hart's investment group negotiated an agreement to spend $36 million to reopen the park under its original name in 2014. Plans involved a major refurbishment of T2 with a timeline to reopen the ride in 2015. It was later revealed that the coaster would be renamed T3. The refurbished ride reopened on July 3, 2015, featuring renovated trains and track to provide a more comfortable experience for riders.

On June 2, 2018, a minor incident occurred on the ride when one train bumped into another, which had been waiting to enter the station for unloading. Five people were injured, with one being taken to the hospital. The coaster was closed for an investigation of the incident, and reopened two days later. T3 closed permanently following the 2022 season, and the ride was dismantled in early 2024 after having been sold to Wonderla, where it reopened on April 10, 2026, as Garuda Glide.

== Characteristics ==
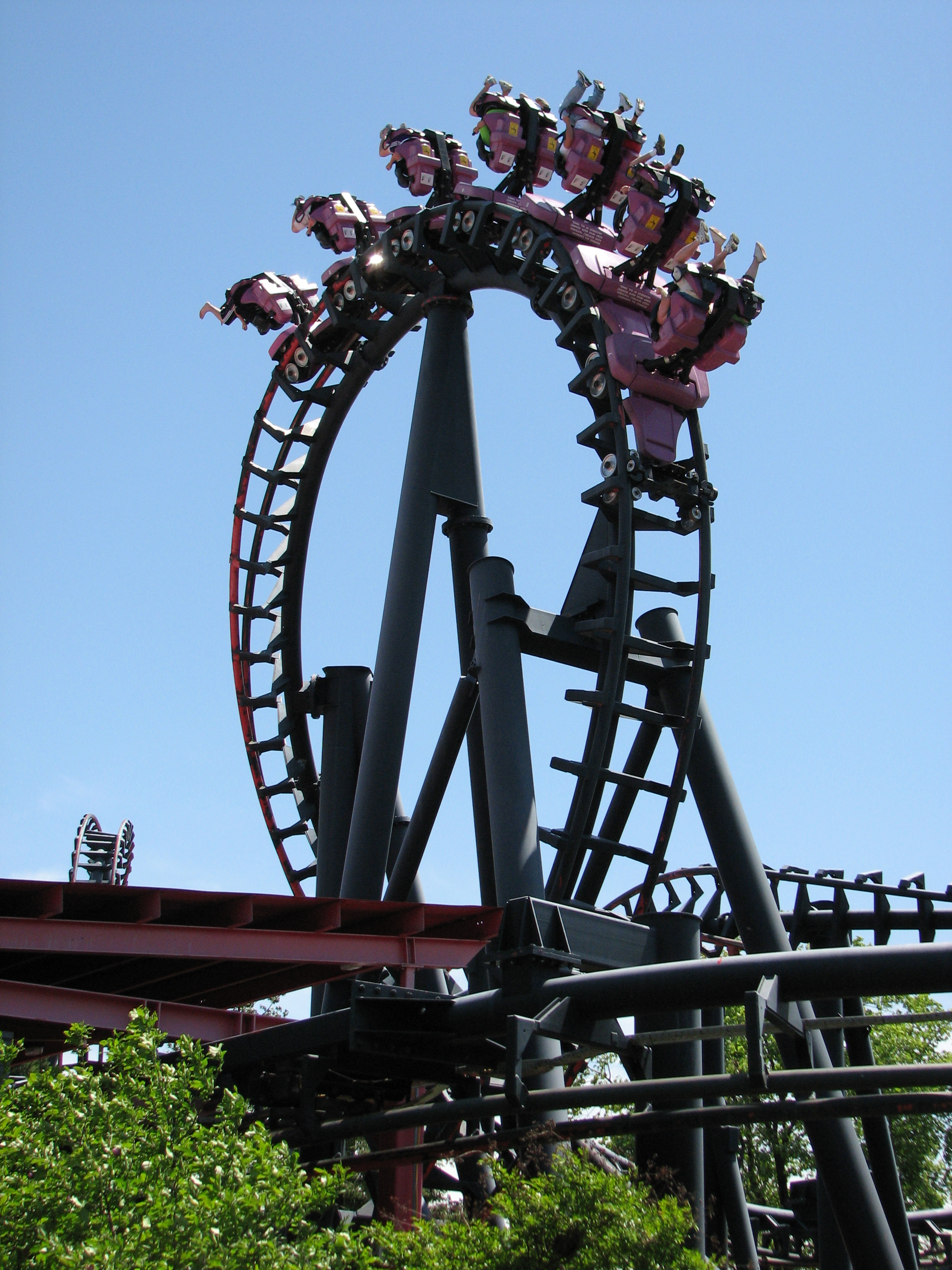
T2's sidewinder element in 2009

The 2,171.9-foot-long (662.0 m) Garuda Glide stands 101.7 feet (31.0 m) tall. With a top speed of 49.7 miles per hour (80.0 km/h), the ride features five inversions, including a rollover, sidewinder and a double in-line twist.

As T2, the ride originally featured three trains. Each of these trains seated 20 riders in ten rows of two. All of the trains were later shortened from ten rows to seven rows, reducing each train's capacity to 14 riders. The third train was later removed from the ride.

== Ride experience ==
Upon leaving the station, the ride directly latches onto the 101.7-foot-tall (31.0 m) chain lift hill. Once at the top, the train descends a banked turn to the right, where it enters the first inversion, a rollover. A rollover inverts riders twice by featuring a half-loop followed by a twist, then another twist and a half-loop. Upon exiting this element, the train goes up a hill, then falls into the ride's next inversion, a sidewinder. The ride exits the sidewinder into a sharp helix before traversing the final two inversions, a double in-line twist. A banked curve to the right turns the train towards the brake run, where it then returns to the station.
