= Woodland Run =

Roller coaster at Kentucky Kingdom

- Previously known as Thunder Run (1990–2024)
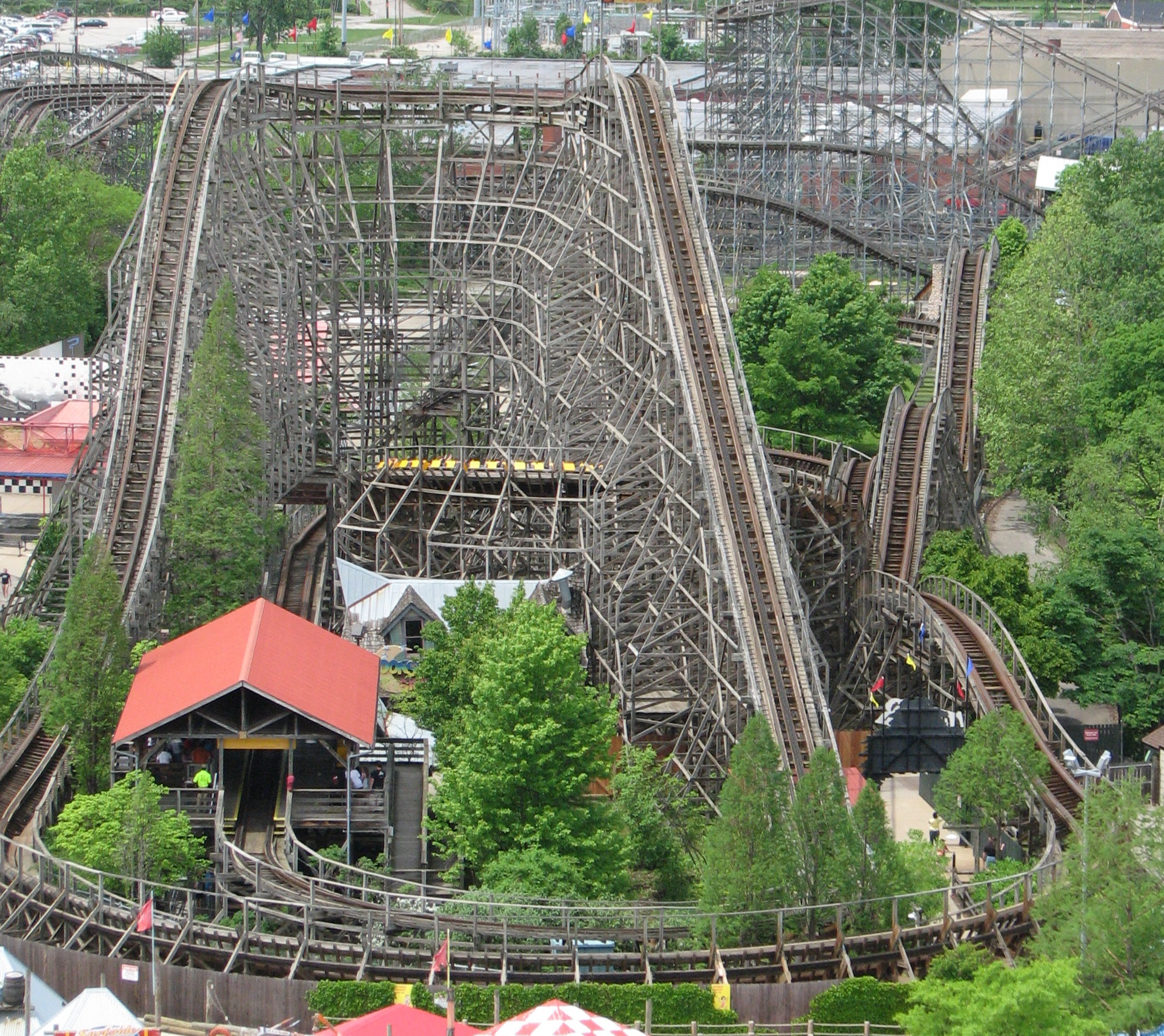

Kentucky Kingdom
- Location: Kentucky Kingdom
- Park section: Discovery Meadow
- Coordinates: 38°11′44″N 85°44′51″W
- Status: Operating
- Opening date: August 1990

General statistics
- Type: Wood
- Manufacturer: Dinn Corporation
- Designer: Curtis D. Summers; John Fetterman
- Model: Custom
- Track layout: Double out-and-back
- Lift/launch system: Chain lift hill
- Height: 90 ft (27 m)
- Drop: 74 ft (23 m)
- Length: 2,850 ft (870 m)
- Speed: 53 mph (85 km/h)
- Inversions: 0
- Duration: 1:54
- Height restriction: 48 in (122 cm)
- Trains: Single train with 6 cars; riders arranged 2 across in 2 rows for a total of 24 riders per train
- Woodland Run at RCDB

Woodland Run is a wooden roller coaster at Kentucky Kingdom in Louisville, Kentucky, United States. The ride opened as Thunder Run in August 1990, and operated until October 2009, when the park was abandoned by its operator, Six Flags. The roller coaster reopened alongside the rest of the park under new operators in May 2014. It was rethemed and renamed to Woodland Run in May 2025.

The ride was manufactured by Dinn Corporation, and designed by Curtis D. Summers and John Fetterman. With 2,850 feet (870 m) of track, Woodland Run stands 90 feet (27 m) tall and features a top speed of 53 miles per hour (85 km/h).

== History ==
Kentucky Kingdom opened on May 23, 1987. The Texas investors who operated the park filed for bankruptcy after only one season of operation. Themeparks LLC, led by Ed Hart, purchased the rights to operate the park in 1989, reopening it in 1990. As part of the reopening, the new operators added a collection of new rides including Thunder Run, which opened in August 1990. Early in Thunder Run's operating life, one of the cars uncoupled while climbing the lift hill, and the ride's lap bars were found to be unsafe. No injuries were reported from these incidents. The ride was retracked by Martin & Vleminckx prior to its closure in 2009.

Thunder Run operated until the end of the 2009 season, which ended on November 1. On February 4, 2010, amid a corporate bankruptcy, Six Flags closed the park due to the rejection of an amended lease by the park's owners, the Kentucky State Fair Board. On June 27, 2013, a group of investors led by Ed Hart negotiated an agreement to reopen the park with a planned investment of $50 million. Rocky Mountain Construction was hired to refurbish the coaster, resulting in replacement of the existing wooden track. On October 10, 2013, Kentucky Kingdom invited members of the media and amusement industry to ride the refurbished Thunder Run. The ride reopened to the public on May 24, 2014. After the 2016 season, Kentucky Kingdom announced that Thunder Run would receive a new train from Philadelphia Toboggan Coasters for the 2017 season. This train replaced the single train that was first put into service in 1990. For the 2025 season, the main drop was retracked and reprofiled using The Gravity Group's precut track. The new drop was steeper, allowing space for a new airtime hill to be added before the first major turn. Also in 2025, the area of the park surrounding Thunder Run was rethemed to Discovery Meadow. Thunder Run was renamed and rethemed to Woodland Run to match this area's theme.

== Characteristics ==
The 2,850-foot-long (870 m) Woodland Run stands 90 feet (27 m) tall. With a top speed of 53 miles per hour (85 km/h), the ride features a ride duration of approximately 2 minutes. The ride operates with a single six-car train. Each car seats riders in two rows of two, allowing for 24 riders per train. It also features 70 degree banked turns.

Woodland Run's design was originally intended for LeSourdsville Lake Amusement Park (known then as Americana Amusement Park). In 1986, John Fetterman presented the design to the Ohio-based park's manager, Ron Berni. The coaster was never built at the original park, and Berni transferred to Kentucky Kingdom in 1989.

The design was later used as the foundation for International Coasters' Hurler roller coaster, located at Carowinds and formerly at Kings Dominion.

== Ride experience ==
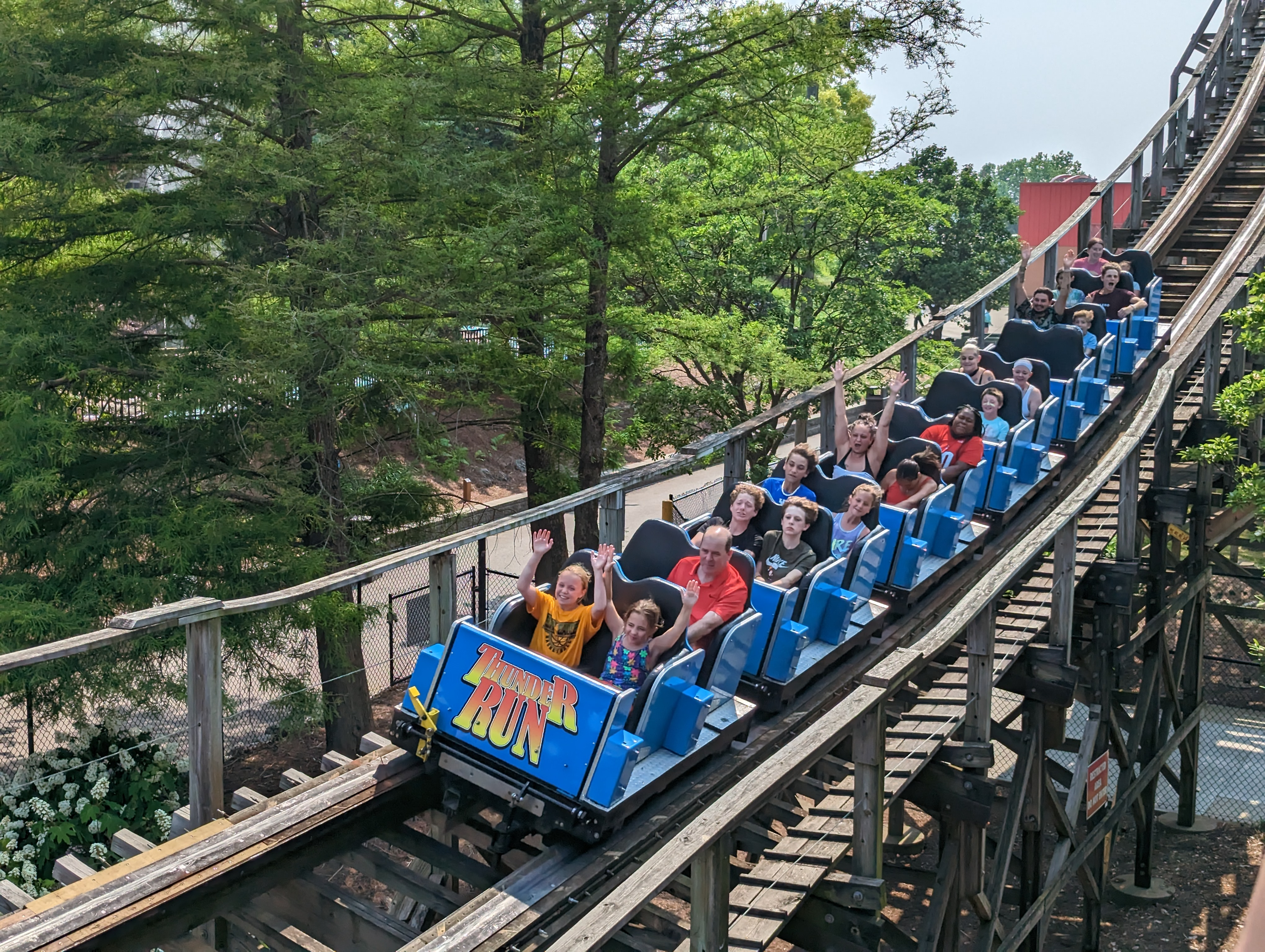
Riders on Thunder Run in 2023

Woodland Run features a double out-and-back layout. It begins with a left turn out of the station. This leads to the 90-foot-tall (27 m) chain lift hill. Once at the top, the train traverses a small dip along a 180 degree turn to the left. The first drop of 74 feet (23 m) leads into a small bunny hop and a near-ground level 70-degree banked turn to the left. A series of small camelback hills are followed by a turnaround. The train proceeds back towards the station with another hill. This process repeats a second time, leading into the brake run and the station.

== Reception ==
In 1993 and 1994, Thunder Run was cited by Amusement Business as the "Most Terrifying Roller Coaster" on a top 10 list. Inside Track magazine ranked Thunder Run as the "fourth best of its kind in the nation". In 2007, the Lexington Herald-Leader described the ride as having "a few nice drops and that jerky, clicking wooden coaster feel that some people love, but it never gets too wild". Tim O'Brien, formerly of Amusement Business, rode the inaugural run of the ride in 1990, as well as the first cycle of the refurbished ride in 2013. O'Brien describes the updated ride as "a better ride today than it was back then", commending the ride's ability to give a classic wooden roller coaster feel, yet run smoothly. He stated Thunder Run "is one of the top wooden roller coasters in the world".

In Amusement Today's annual Golden Ticket Awards, Woodland Run appeared four times between 2001 and 2004. It debuted at position 34 in 2001 before dropping to 49 in 2004. It has not charted since.

Golden Ticket Awards: Top wood Roller Coasters
Year									1998	1999
Ranking									–	–
Year	2000	2001	2002	2003	2004	2005	2006	2007	2008	2009
Ranking	–	34	39	35	49	–	–	–	–	–
Year	2010	2011	2012	2013	2014	2015	2016	2017	2018	2019
Ranking	–	–	–	–	–	–	–	–	–	–
Year	2020	2021	2022	2023	2024	2025	2026			
Ranking	N/A	–	–	–	–	–	–			

Mitch Hawker's Wooden Coaster Poll was an annual survey of roller coasters around the world. In that poll, Thunder Run entered at position 30 in 1994, maintaining an average of 54 for the 17 years that followed. The ride's ranking in subsequent polls is shown in the table below.

Mitch Hawker's Best Roller Coaster Poll: Best wood-Tracked Roller Coaster
Year	1994	1995	1996	1997	1998	1999	2000	2001	2002	2003	2004	2005	2006	2007	2008	2009
Ranking	30	56	41	47	54	50	53	52	39	41	48	46	59	60	64	86
