= Nightmare at Crack Axle Canyon =

Former roller coaster in New York

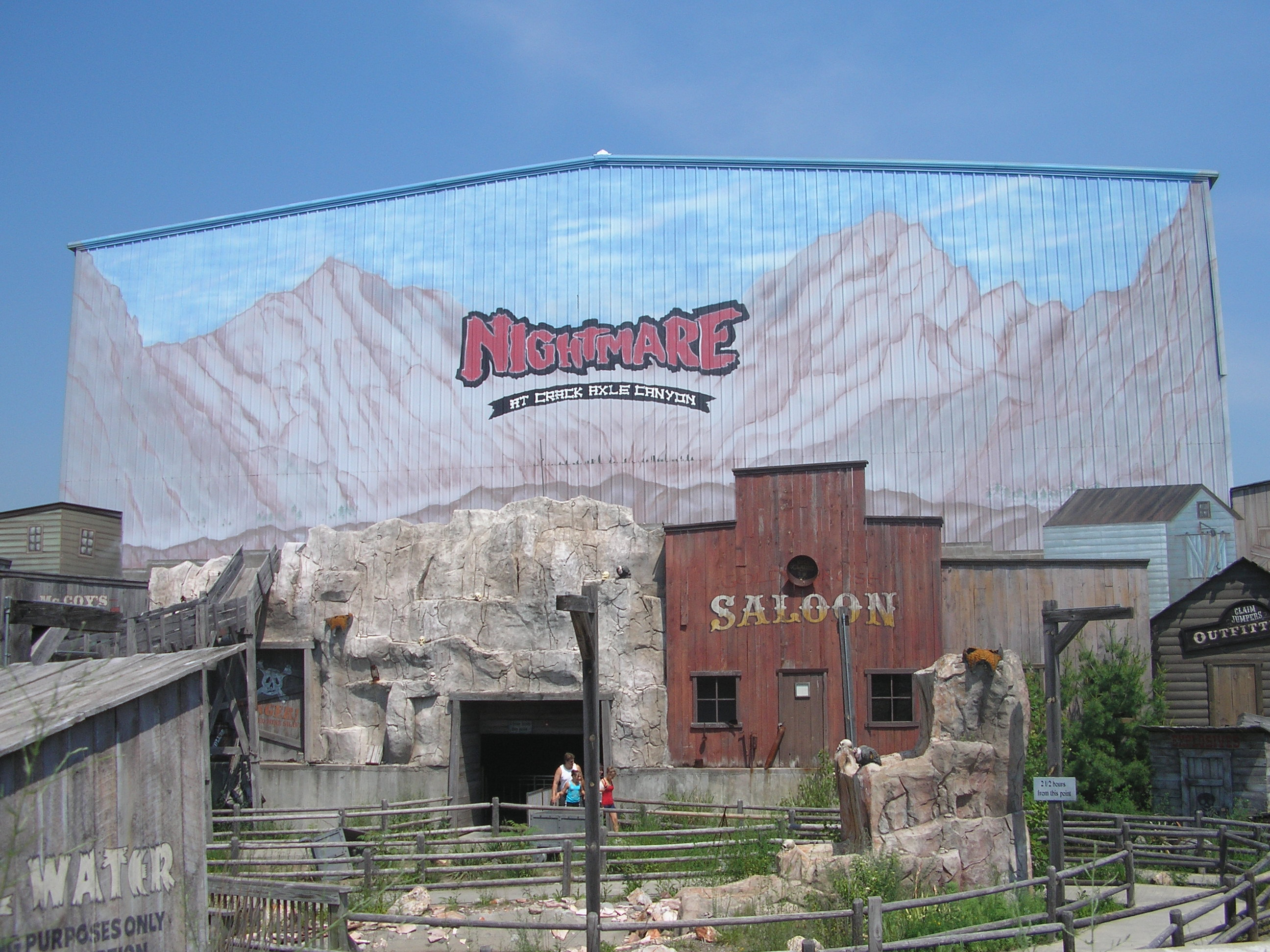
- Building exterior and entrance to Nightmare at Crack Axle Canyon

Great Escape
- Park section: Ghosttown
- Coordinates: 43.352491°N 73.692515°W
- Status: Removed
- Opening date: 1999
- Closing date: 2006

Darien Lake
- Coordinates: 42.929°N 78.385°W
- Status: Removed
- Opening date: 1996
- Closing date: 1998

Kentucky Kingdom
- Coordinates: 38.195°N 85.747°W
- Status: Removed
- Opening date: May 23, 1987
- Closing date: 1995

Noble Park Funland
- Status: Removed
- Opening date: 1985
- Closing date: 1986

Beech Bend
- Coordinates: 37.024°N 86.395°W
- Status: Removed
- Closing date: 1984

General statistics
- Type: Steel – Enclosed
- Manufacturer: Anton Schwarzkopf
- Model: Jet Star
- Lift/launch system: Chain lift hill
- Height: 44 ft (13 m)
- Length: 1,765 ft (538 m)
- Speed: 31 mph (50 km/h)
- Inversions: 0
- Height restriction: 48 in (122 cm)
- Trains: a single car; riders arranged 1 across in 4 rows for a total of 4 riders per train
- Nightmare at Crack Axle Canyon at RCDB

Nightmare at Crack Axle Canyon (formerly known as Nightmare At Phantom Cave and Starchaser) was an enclosed Jet Star roller coaster at Six Flags Great Escape and Hurricane Harbor in Queensbury, New York, United States. The steel coaster, manufactured by Anton Schwarzkopf, was enclosed in a dark warehouse-like building, giving a heightened sense of speed and disorientation around its layout. The ride was located in the park's Old West-themed Ghosttown area.

== History ==
The ride originally opened at some point between 1968 and 1972 at Beech Bend in Bowling Green, Kentucky, as Jet Star. It operated there until 1984, when it was moved to Noble Park Funland in Paducah, Kentucky. It operated there in 1985 and 1986, before it was then moved to Kentucky Kingdom, where it reopened in 1987 as Starchaser. It operated at Kentucky Kingdom until 1995. The following year, it was moved to Darien Lake (now Six Flags Darien Lake) as Nightmare At Phantom Cave. It operated at Six Flags Darien Lake from 1996 to 1998. It then saw its final relocation to Six Flags Great Escape (known then simply as Great Escape), operating there from 1999 to 2006 as Nightmare at Crack Axel Canyon. It closed for the final time at the end of the 2006 season, and the park later confirmed that the coaster had been scrapped. In 2013, the building was used for a haunted house attraction during Fright Fest, the park's Halloween event.

== Ride experience ==
The ride was a Jet Star roller coaster featuring tight turns and small dips in a relatively compact area. The trains were single cars with two rows of two riders each for a total of four riders per car.
