= Flashback (Six Flags New England) =

Roller coaster at Six Flags New England

- Previously known as Boomerang at Star Lake Amusement Park (1985–1989); The Vampire at Six Flags Kentucky Kingdom (1990–1999)
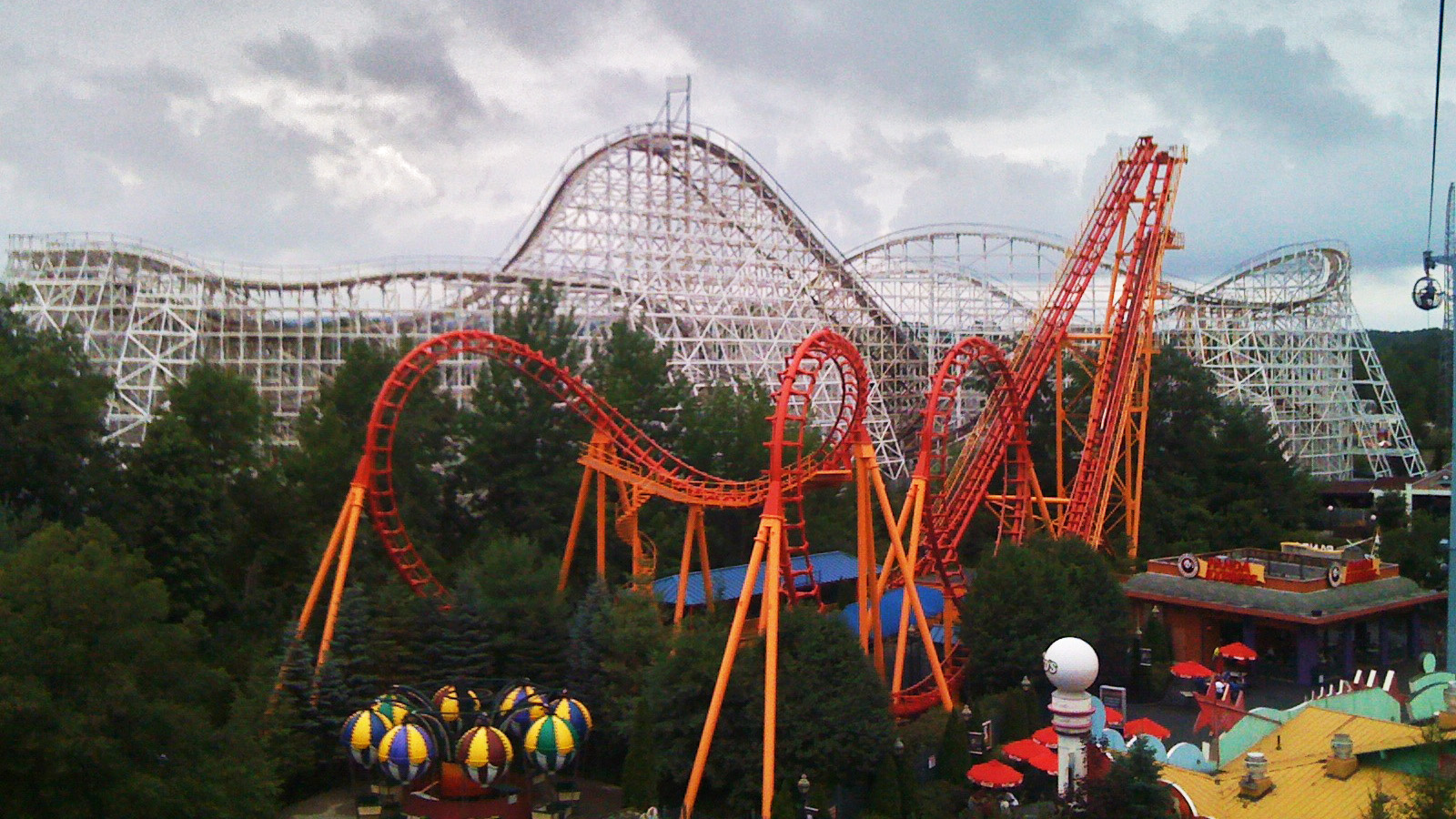

Six Flags New England
- Park section: North End
- Coordinates: 42°2′24″N 72°36′54″W
- Status: Operating
- Opening date: May 5, 2000

Six Flags Kentucky Kingdom
- Coordinates: 38.195°N 85.747°W
- Status: Removed
- Opening date: June 13, 1990
- Closing date: 1999
- Replaced: Ohio River Adventure
- Replaced by: Stampede Run

Star Lake Amusement Park
- Coordinates: 23.051°N 112.490°E
- Status: Removed
- Opening date: 1985
- Closing date: 1989

General statistics
- Type: Steel – Shuttle
- Manufacturer: Vekoma
- Model: Boomerang
- Lift/launch system: Catch car lift hill, chain lift hill
- Height: 117 ft (36 m)
- Length: 935 ft (285 m)
- Speed: 47 mph (76 km/h)
- Inversions: 3
- Duration: 1:48
- Capacity: 760 riders per hour
- G-force: 5.2
- Height restriction: 48 in (122 cm)
- Fast Lane available
- Flashback at RCDB

Flashback (formerly Boomerang and Vampire) is a steel roller coaster at Six Flags New England in Agawam, Massachusetts. The shuttle coaster originally operated at Star Lake Amusement Park in China and at Kentucky Kingdom (formerly Six Flags Kentucky Kingdom) in Louisville, Kentucky, before being moved to Six Flags New England, where it opened in 2000. It was built by Vekoma and is a Boomerang model.

== History ==
The ride began its life at Star Lake Amusement Park in Zhaoqing, China, where it operated from 1985 to 1990. It was then moved to Kentucky Kingdom and renamed Vampire, with a controversial slogan: "Give blood at your local park". It opened on June 13, 1990, the park's grand reopening after having been closed for two years.

Kentucky Kingdom was bought by Premier Parks in late 1997, which bought out the Six Flags chain in 1998. The park was subsequently renamed Six Flags Kentucky Kingdom in June 1998. The ride continued to operate at the park until 1999, when it began to experience mechanical problems. It was then moved to Six Flags New England, where it was renamed Flashback, and opened to the public on May 5, 2000.

== Characteristics ==
The ride has one train with a capacity of twenty-eight riders, seating in two rows of two with seven cars. Upon dispatch from the station, the train is pulled backwards up the lift hill, then dropped back through the station into a cobra roll and a vertical loop. At the end of this cycle, the train is pulled up the lift hill on the opposite end of the track. It is then released, allowing the train to traverse the track in the opposite direction.

== See also ==
- Boomerang: Coast to Coaster
