= Stampede Run (roller coaster) =

Roller coaster at Kentucky Kingdom

- Previously known as Lightning Run (2014–2026)
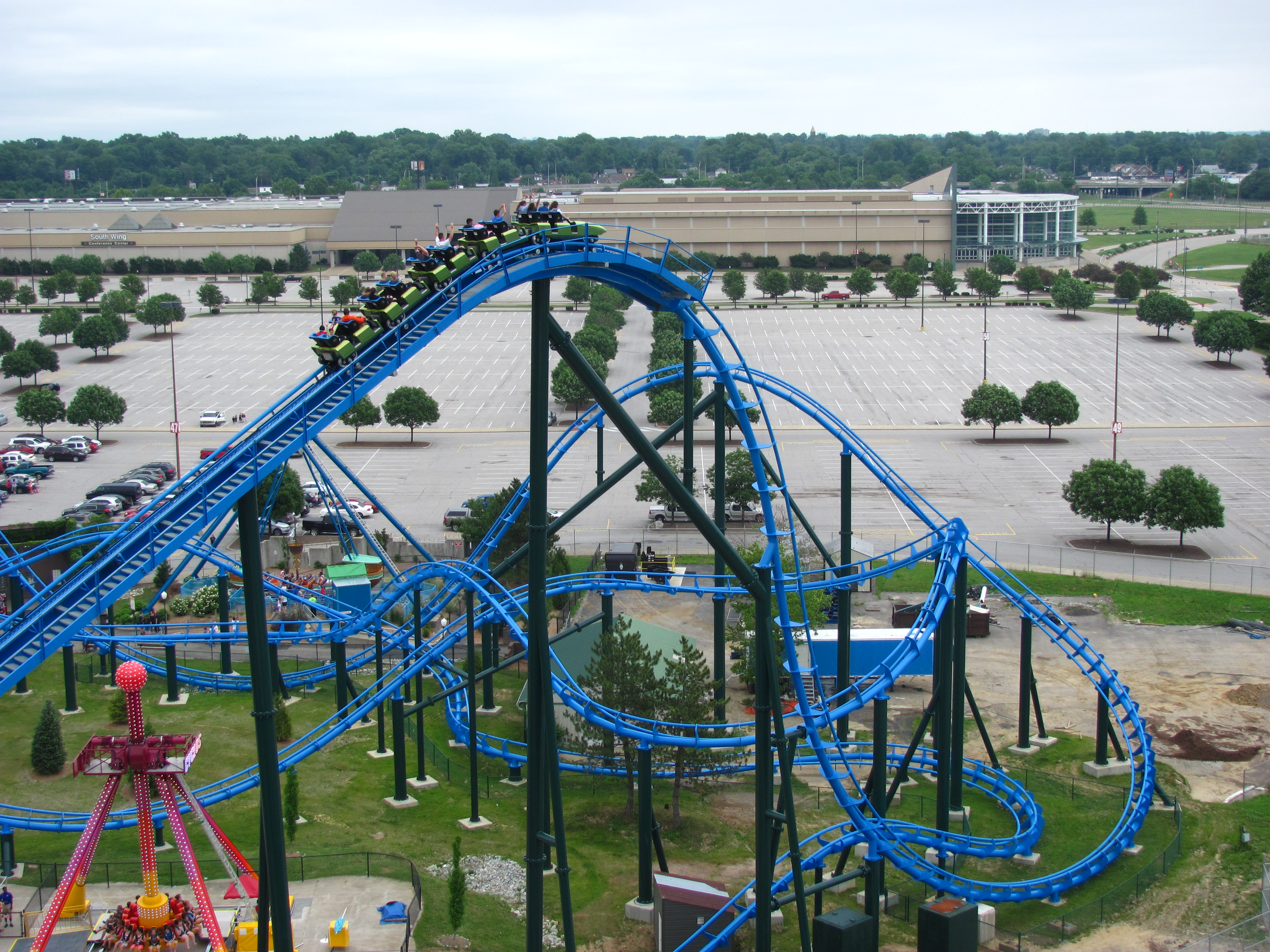

Kentucky Kingdom
- Location: Kentucky Kingdom
- Park section: Happy Valley Farm
- Coordinates: 38.196461°N 85.744041°W
- Status: Operating
- Opening date: May 24, 2014
- Replaced: Greezed Lightnin'

General statistics
- Manufacturer: Chance Rides
- Model: Hyper GT-X Coaster
- Lift/launch system: Chain lift hill
- Drop: 100 ft (30 m)
- Length: 2,500 ft (760 m)
- Speed: 55 mph (89 km/h)
- Inversions: 0
- Duration: 2:00
- Max vertical angle: 80°
- Capacity: 800 riders per hour
- Height restriction: 48 in (122 cm)
- Trains: 2 trains with 5 cars; riders arranged 2 across in 2 rows for a total of 20 riders per train
- Stampede Run at RCDB

Stampede Run (formerly known as Lightning Run) is a steel roller coaster located at Kentucky Kingdom in Louisville, Kentucky, United States. The ride opened in 2014, and as of November 2026, it is the only operating Hyper GT-X coaster built by Chance Rides.

== History ==
In February 2010, park operator Six Flags closed Kentucky Kingdom (known then as Six Flags Kentucky Kingdom) after a negotiation could not be reached with the Kentucky State Fair Board, who owned the park, for a new lease. In May 2010, local businessman and original operator of the park, Ed Hart, returned to operate the park again, 12 years after selling the park to Six Flags (then Premier Parks). However, after a year of trying to negotiate with the Fair Board over a lease, negotiations with Hart abruptly ended in September 2011. In August 2012, Ed Hart returned to the Fair Board with a new proposal, which included a US$15 million Bolliger & Mabillard roller coaster, but the plans were changed to a US$7 million roller coaster and a different manufacturer. Chance Rides was then hired to build a brand new coaster model for the park. The ride opened as Lightning Run on May 24, 2014.

On November 5, 2026, it was announced that the area of the park containing Lightning Run would be rethemed and named Happy Valley Farms for the 2027 season. Lightning Run was renamed to Stampede Run to fit the new theme of the area.

== Reception ==
Stampede Run ranked fifth place in Amusement Today magazine's Golden Ticket Awards for Best New Ride of 2014 with 9% of the vote.

Golden Ticket Awards: Best New Ride for 2014
Ranking	5
