= Kentucky State Fair =

Annual event in Kentucky, United States

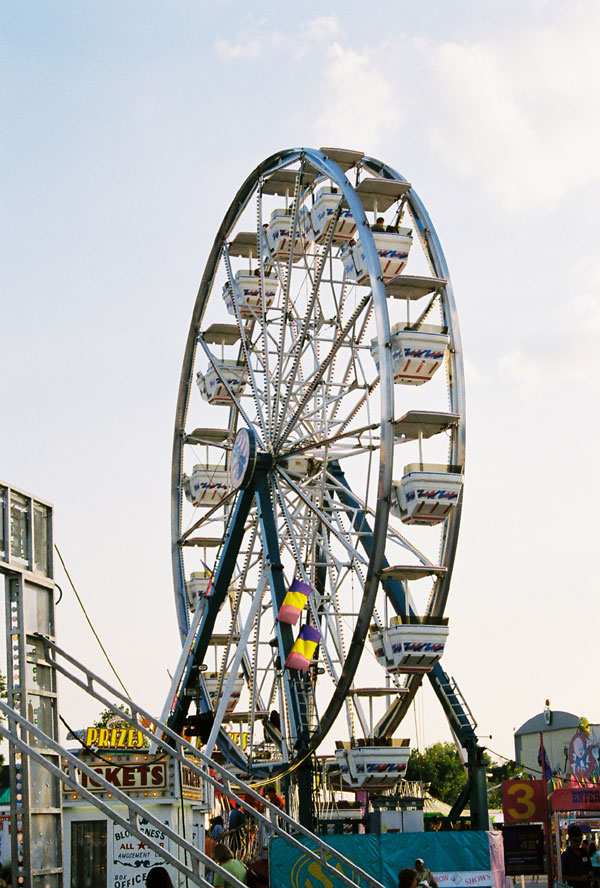
Ferris wheel on the midway of the Kentucky State Fair

The Kentucky State Fair is the official state fair of Kentucky which takes place at the Kentucky Exposition Center in Louisville. More than 600,000 fairgoers fill the 520 acres (2.1 km^{2}) of indoor and outdoor exhibits; activities include sampling a wide variety of food and riding several roller coasters during the 11-day event. The Kentucky State Fair includes competitions in crafts such as quilt-making, homebrew beers, and home-made pastries, as well as fine arts and agricultural competitions. Exhibitor spaces are available and are popular with area and regional businesses.

The Kentucky State Fair boasts 1,200,000 square feet (110,000 m^{2}) of indoor space that often feature exhibits that include acrobats, magical illusionists, balloon sculptors and home improvement demonstrations.

The Kentucky State Fair World's Championship Horse Show is one of the fair's events.

== History ==
The fair was organized in 1816, just five years after the United States' first fair in Massachusetts. Fayette County farmer Colonel Lewis Sanders (no known relation to Colonel Harlan Sanders of Kentucky Fried Chicken fame) was the organizer. The event did not become an official state fair until 1902. The fair moved from city to city until 1907, when Louisville became the fair's permanent home. Churchill Downs has hosted the fair on three occasions, particularly during World War II. The fair moved to its current site at the Kentucky Exposition Center in 1956.

There were cancellations in 1862 to 1864, 1917 to 1918, and 1942 to 1944. The COVID-19 pandemic caused officials to present the 2020 fair in modified fashion.

== Safety and security ==
The Kentucky State Fair Board Police Department are responsible for safety and security at premises owned by the State Fair Board. They are appointed by the Board as "special police", and have the powers and duties of peace officers.

== See also ==
- List of attractions and events in the Louisville metropolitan area
