= 2022 in amusement parks =

This is a list of events and openings related to amusement parks that occurred in 2022. These various lists are not exhaustive.

== Amusement parks ==
=== Opening ===
- Belgium Beverland Maaseik - May 14
- China Fantawild Land - July 9
- China Fantasy Valley - April 29
- China Fantawild Yunnan - TBA
- China Hangzhou Bay Sunac Tourism City - TBA
- Germany Karls Erlebnis-Dorf Oberhausen - November 22
- South Korea Legoland Korea - May 5
- U.S. Lost Island Theme Park - June 18
- South Korea Lotte World Adventure Busan - Magic Forest - March 31
- China Ocean Flower Island Fairyland - TBA
- China Oriental Heritage Anyang - TBA
- China Oriental Heritage Zhengzhou - TBA
- Poland Majaland Warschau - May 1
- China Nickelodeon Universe Chongqing - TBA
- U.S. Canyon Coaster Adventure Park Arizona - April 8
- U.S. Lost Island Theme Park Iowa - June 18
- U.S. Peppa Pig Theme Park Florida - February 24
- U.S. Scene75 Entertainment Center Romeoville - August 17
- U.S. Sesame Place San Diego - March 26
- Vietnam Sun World Hon Thom Nature Park - February 1
- Indonesia Transmart Tajur - Bogor - TBA
- China Zigong Fantawild Dinosaur Kingdom - June 18

=== Reopened ===
- U.K. Curry's Fun Park Portrush

=== Change of name ===
- Ireland Tayto Park » Emerald Park
- Malaysia Genting Outdoor Theme Park » Genting SkyWorlds at Resorts World Genting
- UAE VR Park Dubai » Play DXB at The Dubai Mall
- U.K. Barry's Amusements » Curry's Fun Park Portrush
- U.S. SpeedZone Los Angeles » Boomers! Los Angeles

=== Change of ownership ===
- Canada Calypso Park – Drouin family » Premier Parks, LLC
- U.K. Curry's Fun Park Portrush – Trufelli family » Curry family
- U.S. Gilroy Gardens – Cedar Fair » Gilroy Gardens, Inc.
- Mexico Selva Mágica – Ventura Entertainment » The Dolphin Company
- Mexico Selvatica - The Adventure Tribe – Ventura Entertainment » The Dolphin Company
- Canada Valcartier Outdoor Water Park – Drouin family » Premier Parks, LLC
- Canada Valcartier Indoor Bora Parc – Drouin family » Premier Parks, LLC
- Mexico Ventura Fly & Ride Park – Ventura Entertainment » The Dolphin Company
- Mexico Ventura Park – Ventura Entertainment » The Dolphin Company

=== Birthdays ===
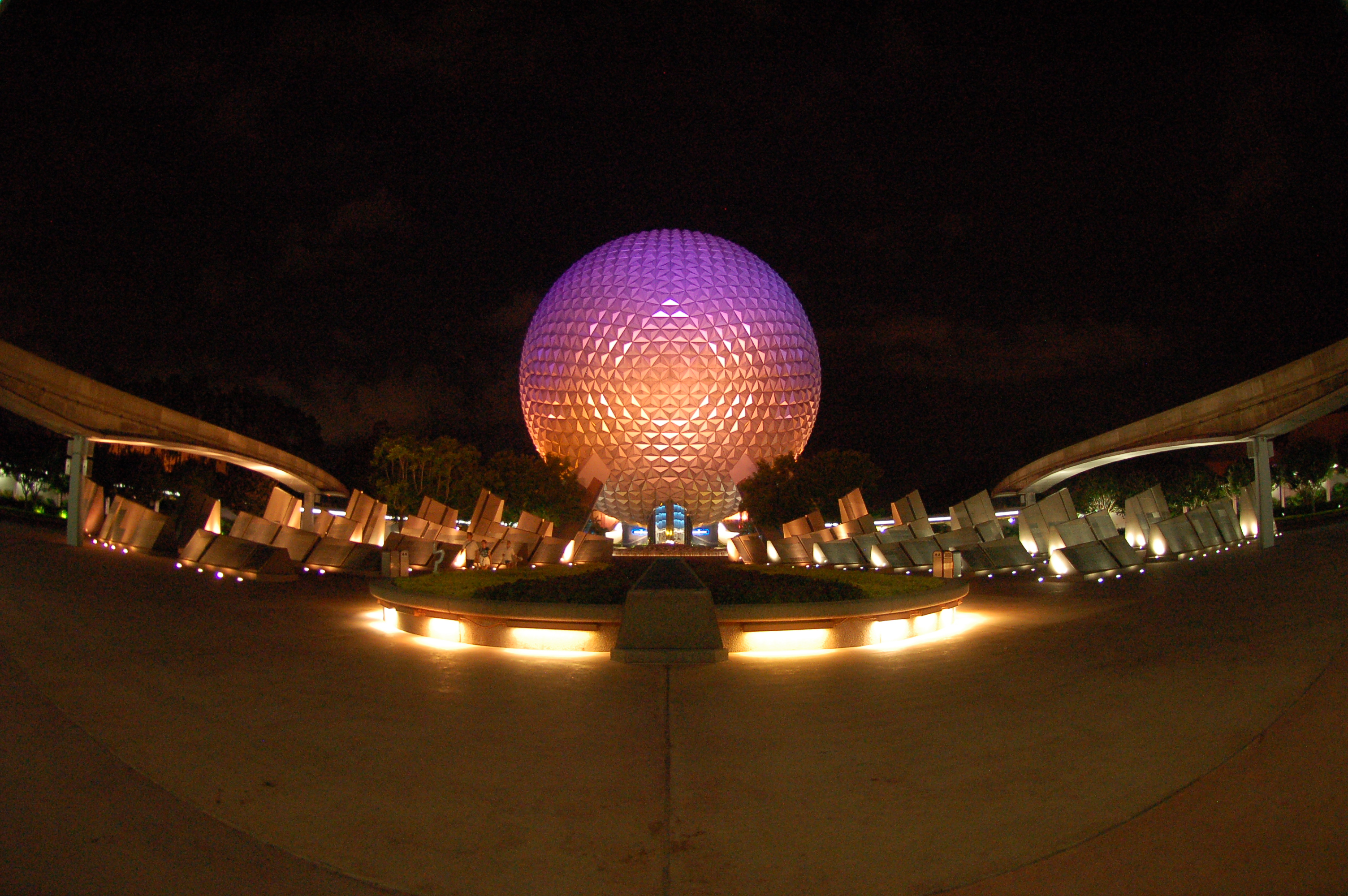
EPCOT celebrates its 40th anniversary in October.

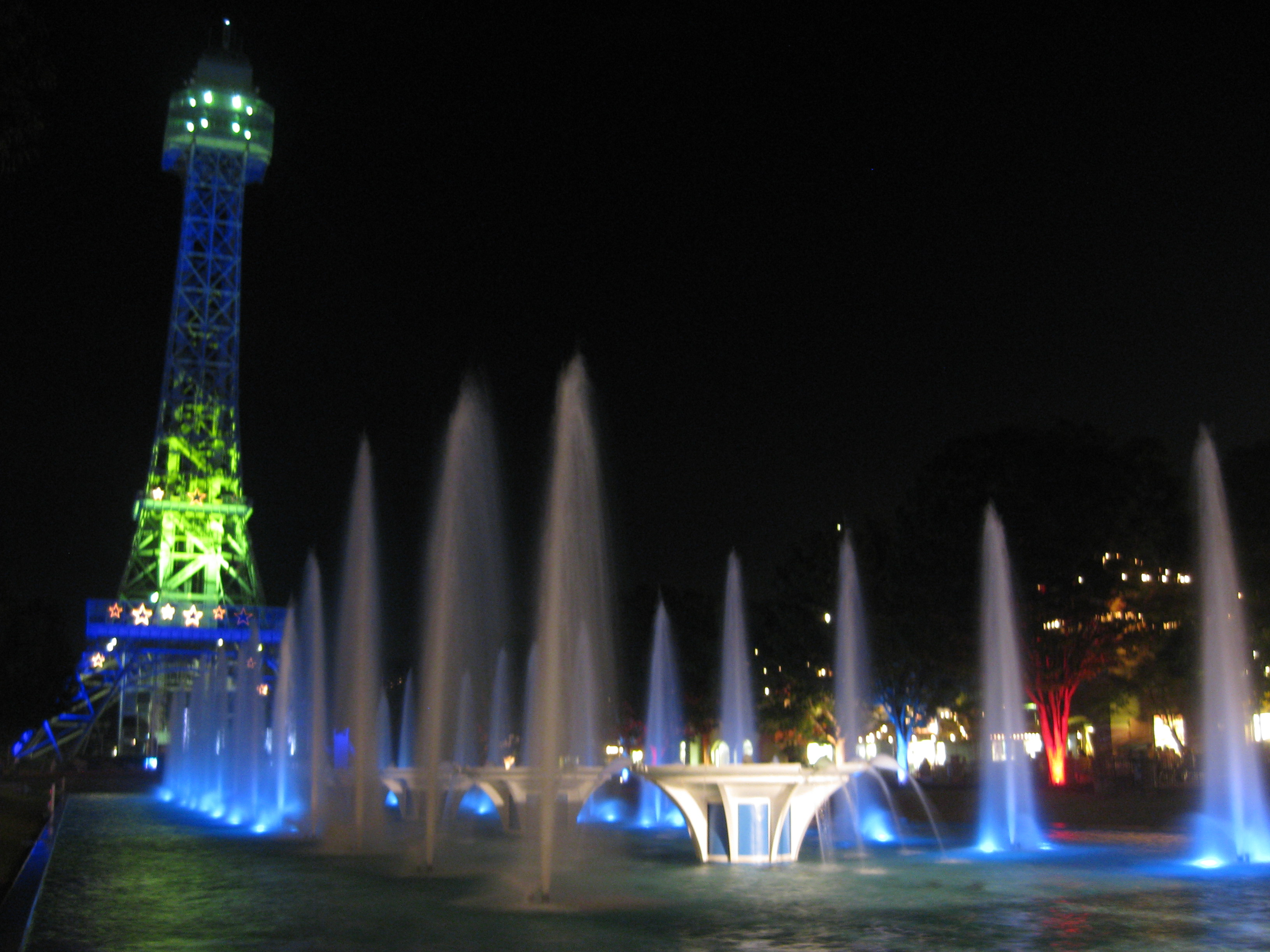
Kings Island celebrates its 50th anniversary in April.

- Adventureland New York - 60th Birthday
- Phantasialand – 55th Birthday
- Epcot – 40th Birthday
- Disneyland Paris – 30th Birthday
- Chessington World of Adventures – 35th Birthday
- Kentucky Kingdom - 35th Birthday
- Kings Island – 50th Birthday
- Six Flags Fiesta Texas – 30th birthday
- Six Flags Over Georgia – 55th birthday
- Walt Disney Studios Park – 20th birthday
- La Ronde – 55th birthday
- Luna Park Melbourne – 110th birthday
- Mirabilandia – 30th birthday
- Futuroscope – 35th birthday
- Efteling – 70th birthday
- Ocean Park Hong Kong – 45th birthday
- Wild Waves Theme Park - 45th birthday

=== Closed ===
- Adventure Landing Jacksonville Beach – March 31
- Bosque Mágico – August 28
- Joyland Amusement Park

== Additions ==
=== Roller coasters ===
==== New ====
Name	Park	Type	Manufacturer	Opened	Ref(s)
Acorn Adventure	Genting SkyWorlds	Steel roller coaster	Beijing Shibaolai Amusement Equipment	April 30	
Barracuda	Fuli Ocean Happy World	Steel roller coaster	Intamin	TBA	
Beyond the Cloud	Suzhou Amusement Land Forest World	Steel roller coaster	Mack Rides	July	
Brava!	Massachusetts Museum of Contemporary Art	P'Sghetti Bowl	Skyline Attractions	October 30	
Butterfly	Beverland Maaseik	Butterfly	Sunkid GmbH	May 14	
Canyon Coaster	Canyon Coaster Adventure Park	Alpine coaster		April 8	
Carrara	Mandoria	Powered roller coaster	Mack Rides	July 2	
Cyclone	Indiana Beach	Steel roller coaster	Interpark	April 30	
Daddy Pig's Roller Coaster	Peppa Pig Theme Park Florida	Family Launched roller coaster	Zamperla	February 24	
DaVinci Ride	Fantasy Valley	Wing Coaster	Bolliger & Mabillard	April 29	
Defiance	Glenwood Caverns Adventure Park	Eurofighter	Gerstlauer	July 1	
Dingo Racer	Aussie World	Spinning roller coaster	Reverchon	June 30	
Dino Dash	Tayto Park	Junior roller coaster	Vekoma	April 9	
Dino Dash	Zigong Fantawild Dinosaur Kingdom	Junior roller coaster	unknown	June 18	
Dr. Diabolical's Cliffhanger	Six Flags Fiesta Texas	Dive coaster	Bolliger & Mabillard	July 30	
Dragon	Legoland Korea	Family roller coaster	Zierer	May 5	
Emperor	SeaWorld San Diego	Dive coaster	Bolliger & Mabillard	March 12	
Erdbeer-Raupenbahn	Karls Erlebnis-Dorf Oberhausen	Family roller coaster	SBF Visa Group	November 22	
Farmyard Flyer	Paultons Park	Family roller coaster	Zierer	April 1	
Fireball	Adventureland New York	Roller Ball	Ride Engineers Switzerland	May 21	
Fire Mountain	Zigong Fantawild Dinosaur Kingdom	Suspended Family Coaster	Vekoma	June 22	
Fønix	Fårup Sommerland	Steel roller coaster	Vekoma	April 9	
Fyr & Flamme	Hunderfossen Familiepark	BOB Coaster	Gerstlauer	May 26	
Giant Digger	Lotte World Adventure Busan - Magic Forest	Launched roller coaster	Mack Rides	March 31	
Giant Splash	Lotte World Adventure Busan - Magic Forest	PowerSplash	Mack Rides	March 31	
Grand Prix Racers	Gulliver's Milton Keynes	Family roller coaster	SBF Visa Group	July 23	
Guardians of the Galaxy: Cosmic Rewind	Epcot	Indoor roller coaster	Vekoma	May 27	
HuriHuri	TusenFryd	Spinning roller coaster	Zamperla	May 7	
Ice Breaker	SeaWorld Orlando	Launched roller coaster	Premier Rides	February 18	
Ice Peak Ride	Fantasy Valley	Steel roller coaster	Jinma Rides	April 29	
Invincible Warriors	Fantawild Land	Steel roller coaster	Vekoma	July 9	
John Wick: Open Contract	Motiongate Dubai	4th Dimension roller coaster	S&S – Sansei Technologies	January 21	
Leviathan	Sea World	Wooden roller coaster	Martin & Vleminckx; The Gravity Group	December 2	
Lokolo	Lost Island Theme Park	Junior roller coaster	SBF Visa Group	June 18	
Mysterious Cookie Train	Lotte World Adventure Busan - Magic Forest	Steel roller coaster	Preston & Barbieri	March 31	
Now You See Me: High Roller	Motiongate Dubai	Spinning roller coaster	Maurer Rides	January 21	
Pantheon	Busch Gardens Williamsburg	Launched Blitz Coaster	Intamin	March 25	
Pine Tree Rocket	Fantawild Land	Family Boomerang	Vekoma	July 9	
Puppy Coaster	Fantawild Land	Family roller coaster	Beijing Shibaolai Amusement Equipment	July 9	
Roaring Timbers	Sun World Hon Thom Nature Park	Wooden roller coaster	Great Coasters International	February 1	
Rolling Thunder	Big Rivers Waterpark	Mixed Coaster	SBF Visa Group	April 2	
Samba Gliders	Genting SkyWorlds	Swing Thing	Setpoint	February 2	
Shark Escape	Jenkinson's Boardwalk	Steel roller coaster	SBF Visa Group	June 30	
Sidewinder Safari	Six Flags Discovery Kingdom	Spinning Wild Mouse roller coaster	Zamperla	May 28	
Sik	Flamingo Land	Steel roller coaster	Intamin	July 2	
Sky Loop	Riyadh Winter Wonderland	Sky Rocket II	Premier Rides	January 21	
Storm	Dubai Hills Mall	Indoor Polercoaster	Intamin	February 17	
Strohnado	Rasti-Land	Mixed Coaster	SBF Visa Group	April	
Super Grover's Box Car Derby	Sesame Place San Diego	Family roller coaster	Zierer	March 26	
Texas Twister	Julianatoren	Spinning roller coaster	SBF Visa Group	April 15	
TNT	Gumbuya World	Suspended Family Coaster	Vekoma	23 December	
Tony's Express	Luna Park	Junior roller coaster	Zamperla	August 30	
T-Rex Family Coaster	Djurs Sommerland	Powered roller coaster	Mack Rides	April 30	
Tsunami	Scene75 Entertainment Center Romeoville	Spinning roller coaster	SBF Visa Group	August 17	
Tumbili	Kings Dominion	4th Dimension roller coaster	S&S – Sansei Technologies	March 12	
Turbo Dino	Zigong Fantawild Dinosaur Kingdom	Family Boomerang	Vekoma	June 18	
Twister	Fuli Ocean Happy World	Spinning roller coaster	Intamin	TBA	
Vic the Viking Coaster	Majaland Warschau	Family roller coaster	Zierer	May 1	
Wonder Woman Flight of Courage	Six Flags Magic Mountain	Single-rail roller coaster	Rocky Mountain Construction	July 16	
飞舟冲浪	Fantasy Valley	Water coaster	Jinma Rides	April 29	

==== Relocated ====
Name	Park	Type	Manufacturer	Opened	Formerly	Ref(s)
Cheddar Chase	Alabama Adventure & Splash Adventure	Wild mouse roller coaster	L&T Systems	July 2	Wild Lightnin' at Lake Winnepesaukah	
Forza	Tosselilla Summer Park	Steel roller coaster	Zierer	July 2	Crossbow at Bowcraft Playland	
Nopuko Air Coaster	Lost Island Theme Park	Suspended Looping Coaster	Vekoma	June 18	Cape Cobra at Ratanga Junction	
Prairie Screamer	Traders Village	Steel roller coaster	E&F Miler Industries	November 12	Screamer at Scandia Amusement Park	
Project Zero	Gumbuya World	SkyLoop	Maurer Rides	December 23	BuzzSaw at Dreamworld	
Rhaegal	Le Fleury	Steel roller coaster	I.E. Park	April 20	Runaway Timber Train at Landmark Forest Adventure Park	
Rupsje Mae	De Waarbeek	Family roller coaster	Güven Amusement Rides Factory	April 2	Krummel at De Valkenier	
Taka Waka	Freizeit-Land Geiselwind	Steel roller coaster	SBF Visa Group	April 10	Tiger Ride at Kneippbyn	
Venus GP	Himeji Central Park	Steel roller coaster	Maurer Rides	July 16	Venus GP at Space World	
Vipère	La Ronde	4th Dimension roller coaster	Intamin	Cancelled opening	Green Lantern: First Flight at Six Flags Magic Mountain	
unknown	Niagara Amusement Park & Splash World	Shuttle Loop	Anton Schwarzkopf	In storage	Cascabel 2.0 at La Feria de Chapultepec	

==== Refurbished ====
Name	Park	Type	Manufacturer	Opened	Formerly	Ref(s)
Avengers Assemble: Flight Force	Walt Disney Studios Park	Launched roller coaster	Vekoma	July 20	Rock 'n' Roller Coaster Starring Aerosmith	
Fluch des Kraken	Freizeit-Land Geiselwind	Boomerang roller coaster	Vekoma	2022	Boomerang	
Iron Gwazi	Busch Gardens Tampa	Hyper-Hybrid roller coaster	Rocky Mountain Construction	March 11	Gwazi	
Jolly Rancher Remix	Hersheypark	Boomerang roller coaster	Vekoma	May 28	Sidewinder	
Escape Coaster	Dreamworld	Suspended Family Coaster	Vekoma	2022	Escape from Madagascar	
#LikeMe Coaster	Plopsaland De Panne	Family roller coaster	Zierer	2022	Viktor's Race	
Medusa	Six Flags Great Adventure	Floorless Coaster	Bolliger & Mabillard	July	Bizarro	
Reptilian	Kings Dominion	Bobsled roller coaster	Mack Rides	2022	Avalanche	
Smurfer	Plopsa Coo	Steel roller coaster	Vekoma	July 1	Halvar	
The Flash: Vertical Velocity	Six Flags Great America	Impulse roller coaster	Intamin	May 8	Vertical Velocity, V2	
Tonnerre 2 Zeus	Parc Astérix	Wooden roller coaster	Custom Coasters International	2022	Tonnerre de Zeus	

=== Other attractions ===
==== New ====
Name	Park	Type	Opened	Ref(s)
Amazing Flying Machine	Niagara Amusement Park & Splash World	Flying scooters	2022	
Andy's Adventures Dinosaur Dig	Alton Towers	Show	2022	
Avengers Campus	Walt Disney Studios Park	Themed area	July 20	
Frozen Ever After	Hong Kong Disneyland	Log flume	2022	
George's Fort	Peppa Pig Theme Park Florida	Maze	February 24	
Grampy Rabbit's Dinosaur Adventure	Peppa Pig Theme Park Florida	Tracked Ride	February 24	
Grandad Dog's Pirate Boat Ride	Peppa Pig Theme Park Florida	Rotating Boat Ride	February 24	
Grandpa Pig's Greenhouse	Peppa Pig Theme Park Florida	Walk-through Attraction	February 24	
Harrington Flint's Island Adventure's	Fantasy Island	Dark ride	2022	
Hey Duggee's Big Adventure Badge	Alton Towers	Play area	2022	
JoJo & Gran Gran At Home	Alton Towers	unknown	2022	
Madame Gazelle's Nature Trail	Peppa Pig Theme Park Florida	Nature Trail	February 24	
Mix'd, Favoured By Jolly Rancher	Hersheypark	Zamperla NebluaZ	2022	
Mr. Bull's High Striker	Peppa Pig Theme Park Florida	Kiddy Drop tower	February 24	
Mr. Potato's Showtime Arena	Peppa Pig Theme Park Florida	Stage show	February 24	
Muddy Puddles Splash Pad	Peppa Pig Theme Park Florida	Water play area	February 24	
Peppa Pig's Balloon Ride	Peppa Pig Theme Park Florida	Aerial carousel	February 24	
Peppa Pig's Treehouse	Peppa Pig Theme Park Florida	Treehouse	February 24	
Peppa's Pedal Bike Tour/George's Tricycle Trail	Peppa Pig Theme Park Florida	Bike/Tricycle attraction	February 24	
Screaming Eagles	Fun Spot America Atlanta	Flying scooters	September	
Sweet Valley	Energylandia	Themed area	2022	
Tale of the Lion King	Disneyland	Show	Spring	
The Cinema	Peppa Pig Theme Park Florida	Movie theater	February 24	
The Guardian	Fantasy Island	RoboCoaster	2022	
Trident	Sea World	Sky flyer	Easter	
Web Slingers: A Spider-Man Adventure	Walt Disney Studios Park	Interactive Dark ride	July 20	
Volkanu: Quest for the Golden Idol	Lost Island Theme Park	Dark ride	June 18	
Leti's Treasure	Luna Park	Log flume	2022	

==== Relocated ====
Name	Park	Type	Opened	Formerly	Ref(s)
Gunslinger	Niagara Amusement Park & Splash World	Scrambler	2022	Baltidora at La Feria de Chapultepec	
Skyborne	Lost Island Theme Park	S&S Drop Tower	2022	Turbo Drop at Buffalo Bill's	

==== Refurbished ====
Name	Park	Type	Opened	Formerly	Ref(s)
DC Universe	Six Flags Great America	Themed area	May 26	Yankee Harbor	
Dreamworld Express	Dreamworld	2 ft (610 mm) narrow gauge Railway	July 1	—N/a	
Expedition Zork	Toverland	Log flume	2022	Backstroke	
Finding Nemo: The Big Blue... and Beyond!	Disney's Animal Kingdom	Musical show	2022	Finding Nemo – The Musical	
Jr. Thrillseekers	Six Flags Great Adventure	Themed area	2022	Safari Kids	
Jumanji The Adventure	Gardaland	Dark ride	2022	Ramses: Il RisVeglio	
Kangaroo	Kennywood	Flying Coaster	June 2	—N/a	
Pirates of Speelunker Cave	Six Flags Over Texas	Dark ride	2022	Yosemite Sam and the Gold River Adventure	
Reef Plunge	Aquatica Orlando	Enclosed body slide	March 14	Dolphin Plunge	
Roaring Rapids	Six Flags Great America	River rapids ride	July 30	—N/a	
Sirocco	Efteling	Teacups	2022	Monsieur Cannibale	
Valhalla	Blackpool Pleasure Beach	Dark Flume ride	2022	—N/a	
World of Color	Disney California Adventure	Hydrotechnic show	April 22	—N/a	

== Closed attractions & roller coasters ==
Name	Park	Type	Closed	Refs
Apocalypse	Drayton Manor Resort	Drop tower	October 30	
Action Theater	Carowinds	Motion simulator	August 1	
Boomerang	Bosque Mágico	Frisbee	August 28	
Cobra	Tivoli Friheden	Inverted roller coaster	July 15	
Corkscrew	World Waterpark	Enclosed body slide	November 14	
Haunted Castle	Efteling	Haunted attraction	September 4	
Dodgem	Carowinds	Bumper cars	August 1	
Duel – The Haunted House Strikes Back	Alton Towers	Dark ride	September 6	
Keverbaan	Bellewaerde Park	Family roller coaster	November 6	
Madagascar: A Crate Adventure	Universal Studios Singapore	Free flow boat ride	March 27	
Policías y Ratones	Bosque Mágico	Spinning roller coaster	August 28	
Shrek 4-D	Universal Studios Florida	3-D film	January 10	
SlingShot	Kings Island	Reverse bungee	May	
Sky Flyer	Bosque Mágico	Swing ride	August 28	
Southern Star	Carowinds	Looping Starship	August 1	
Splash	Bosque Mágico	Log Flume	August 28	
Universal's Superstar Parade	Universal Studios Florida	Parade	June 4	
The King Loop Fighter	Bosque Mágico	Loop Fighter	August 28	
Tornado	Bosque Mágico	Steel roller coaster	August 28	
Wacky Worm	Adventure Landing Jacksonville Beach	Family roller coaster	March 31	
Wildcat	Hersheypark	Wooden roller coaster	July 31	
Yo Yo	Carowinds	Swing ride	August 1	
Zombie Ride	Bosque Mágico	Launched roller coaster	August 28	
Parachute Training Center: Edward’s AFB Jump Tower	Six Flags Great Adventure	Intamin Parachute Tower	2022 (closure)	

== Incidents and accidents ==
- ICON Park - On 24 March, a 14-year-old boy was killed after falling from the FreeFall drop tower after his harness unlocked during the decent. The decision was made on 6 October to demolish the ride.
- Warner Bros. Movie World - on 5 April, a 12-year old boy was seriously injured after falling from the Looney Tunes Carousel. The boy was sent to the Gold Coast University Hospital with a deep laceration on his head. The ride is currently closed until further notice.
- Six Flags Great America - on 14 August, three people were injured following a drive-by shooting in the parking lot. Two teenagers were taken to Advocate Condell Medical Center in Libertyville; another victim declined transport. The park reopened the following day.
- Six Flags Great Adventure - on 26 August, fourteen people were injured on El Toro. The ride was deemed compromised and has remained closed.
- Kennywood - on 24 September, three people were injured inside the theme park during a fight. A 15-year-old was charged for the incident, but his charges were dismissed in November.
- Disneyland - on 3 December, a 51-year-old man jumped off a parking structure and died.
