= Buzzsaw (disambiguation) =

Buzzsaw is a common alternative name for a circular saw.

Buzzsaw may also refer to:

- Project Zero, a Maurer AG SkyLoop roller coaster located at Gumbuya World in Tynong, Victoria, Australia. Formerly known as BuzzSaw at Dreamworld.
- Buzzsaw (Transformers), the name of several characters from the Transformers franchise
- The mascot of Howard Payne University
- The Arizona Cardinals of the NFL
- A "stalkers" from the movie The Running Man
- A discontinued file sharing and synchronization service operated by Autodesk
- "Hitler's Buzzsaw", the MG 42 general-purpose machine gun
- "Buzzsaw", a song by The Turtles from The Turtles Present the Battle of the Bands
- "Buzz Saw", a song by Xiu Xiu from their 2006 album The Air Force
