= The Gauntlet (roller coaster) =

Roller coaster

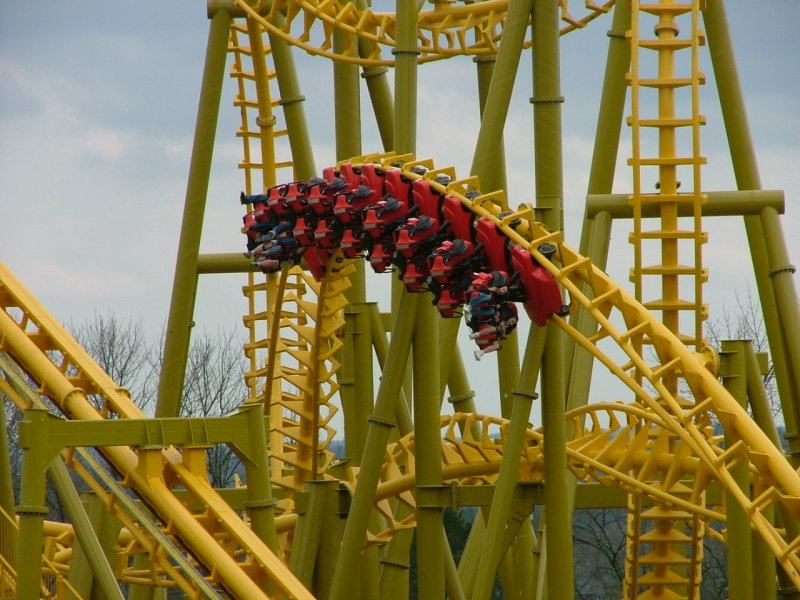
- The Gauntlet in 2004

Magic Springs
- Location: Magic Springs
- Coordinates: 38.194136°N 85.747009°W
- Status: Operating
- Opening date: April 10, 2004
- Cost: $7,000,000

General statistics
- Type: Steel – Inverted
- Manufacturer: Vekoma
- Model: SLC (689m Standard)
- Lift/launch system: Chain lift hill
- Height: 109.0 ft (33.2 m)
- Length: 2,260.0 ft (688.8 m)
- Speed: 49.7 mph (80.0 km/h)
- Inversions: 5
- Duration: 1:36
- Capacity: 1,040 riders per hour
- Height restriction: 52–79 in (132–201 cm)
- Trains: 2 trains with 10 cars; riders arranged 2 across in a single row for a total of 20 riders per train
- The Gauntlet at RCDB

The Gauntlet is an inverted roller coaster located at Magic Springs amusement park in Hot Springs, Arkansas. The Suspended Looping Coaster (SLC) model was manufactured by Vekoma and opened at the park for the 2004 season.

== History ==
The Gauntlet was originally manufactured for Jazzland, a park located in New Orleans, Louisiana, but the sale was never completed. In late 2003, Themeparks LLC announced that they would purchase the roller coaster for their park, Magic Springs. Themeparks LLC reopened Magic Springs in 2000, but attendance had not increased from the number of people that visited the park during that first season.

The name for the roller coaster was chosen through a widespread radio event in late 2003. Becky Branch of Jacksonville, Florida won the contest, choosing to name the ride "The Gauntlet." The ride opened on April 10, 2004, and was well received by guests. The ride's opening helped increase the park's attendance, as 403,000 people visited Magic Springs in 2004, surpassing the park's previous attendance record.

In a 2015 survey conducted by The Weather Channel, The Gauntlet was voted as the most popular thrill ride in Arkansas.
