= Thrillopolis =

Cancelled amusement park

- Interactive map of Thrillopolis
- Location: Nashville, Tennessee (original proposal); Wilson County, Tennessee (second proposal)
- Coordinates: 36°09′42″N 86°46′02″W
- Status: Cancelled
- Owner: Themeparks LLC

Thrillopolis was a planned amusement park that was to have been built by Themeparks LLC in the early 2000s. The park was announced in 2002, and was projected to open in 2005. Thrillopolis was originally planned to be located at an 82-acre site near Adelphia Coliseum, but after conflicts with the local government, Themeparks LLC planned to build the park in Wilson County. The project was scrapped around 2004–05.

== History ==
=== Downtown Nashville proposal ===
In the early 2000s, Themeparks LLC, who were operating Magic Springs in Hot Springs, Arkansas, and had sold Kentucky Kingdom in Louisville, Kentucky to Premier Parks in 1997, were looking to expand. The company began working on plans for an amusement park that was to be built in Nashville, Tennessee, a city that had not had any major amusement park since Opryland USA closed in December 1997. On April 25, 2002, Ed Hart, the CEO of Themeparks LLC, pitched the concept for a Nashville-based theme park called Thrillopolis to Mayor Bill Purcell and the Nashville Chamber of Commerce. Thrillopolis was planned to be built on an 82-acre industrial site, owned by the Steiner Liff Iron and Metal Company, next to Adelphia Coliseum. Construction was to begin in late 2002, and the park was going to open in 2005. During the proposal, Themeparks LLC estimated that the park's construction would cost $193 million, the company wanted $127 million in public financing which they would back with a $100 million letter of credit. Maria Partlow, vice president of marketing for Themeparks LLC, said, "We have to have a public-private partnership, that is the model for how these parks work now."

Several Nashville council members opposed the planned amusement park. Council member J.B. Loring said the proposal “simply doesn’t fit in with the progress of Nashville at all,” and that every council member he spoke to agreed with his opinion that the plan was "ridiculous." Council member Ron Nollner said that the proposal was “Out of the question, In my book, that’s not doable." John Summers, another council member, said that Nashville “shouldn’t be the funding of first resort for a speculative business. If the business doesn’t work out, the city is at risk. Meanwhile, extending the lending capacity to amusement park developers means we have less lending capacity for our real needs, like schools.” Mayor Purcell also showed opposition to the amusement park, saying "Everyone thinks that it would be nice for us to have a theme park, the question is, should we take $127 million in public resources and put it to that use?” Purcell mentioned that he didn't understand why Hart wanted public funding when he didn't seek a bank loan, saying “For returns that are certain, there is a great amount of capital in a market system like ours. For people with ideas to come to a city asking for funding, that usually means that private investors have concluded that it doesn’t meet their standard of risk.” Hart said that he needed credit from the city, because "financing an amusement park of this size privately would mean taking on too much debt."

Many Nashvillians were also opposed to the park's proposed location, next to Adelphia Coliseum. Because of the area's proximity to Downtown Nashville, there were concerns about the park's effect on the city's aesthetic, as it would become a noticeable part of Nashville's skyline.

On June 17, 2002, Themeparks LLC announced that the 82-acre riverfront site in Nashville was no longer under consideration as a possible site for Thrillopolis. During the announcement, Hart said that "the company is looking at various other locations in Nashville-Davidson County, as well as in the greater Middle Tennessee region, as potential sites for a park," Hart continued, saying “It has become apparent that there are divergent opinions about the best use of the Steiner Liff site that do not appear to be reconcilable any time in the near future," adding “Despite our confidence in the initial financing plan, we understand Metro’s concern about assuming credit risk. We look forward to continued discussions with Mayor Purcell to meet his criteria as well as our own.”

=== Wilson County proposal ===
On September 18, 2002, The Wilson County Economic Development Board confirmed that Themeparks LLC was looking at several sites within the county. Many Wilson County residents supported the proposal, one resident said "Maybe it'd save them from raising our taxes again. We'd get out-of-state money coming in." During preliminary discussions with Wilson County officials, Hart mentioned that a scaled-down version of the park would be built. Unlike the Nashville proposal, a water park would be built first, and then expand to add amusement rides. On October 15, 2002, Themeparks LLC announced that they had signed an exclusivity agreement with Wilson County for the development of a theme park. Under the one-year covenant, the two moved forward with a feasibility study to project the potential economic benefits of a public-private partnership. However, Themeparks LLC decided not to build an amusement park in Tennessee, and Thrillopolis was canceled around 2004–05.

During an interview in 2014, Hart reflected on the Thrillopolis proposal, saying "...we tried to work that out with a number of city and state officials. We were at it for about two or three years, but it didn't work out, and some things don't, but it would have been interesting for Nashville to once again have had a nice regional theme park."

== See also ==
- Opryland USA
- Themeparks LLC
