= TNT (roller coaster) =

Gumbuya World
- Location: Gumbuya World
- Coordinates: 38°04′07.2″S 145°39′35.4″E
- Status: Operating
- Opening date: December 23, 2022

General statistics
- Type: Steel – Family – Inverted
- Manufacturer: Vekoma
- Model: Suspended Family Coaster (453m)
- Track layout: Twister
- Height: 17 m (56 ft)
- Length: 452.9 m (1,486 ft)
- Speed: 67 km/h (42 mph)
- Website: Official website
- TNT at RCDB

TNT is an Australian Vekoma suspended family coaster located at Gumbuya World. The coaster opened on in December 2022 and is a popular attraction at the park.

== History ==
TNT was purchased by Gumbuya world along with Project Zero (Formally Buzzsaw at Dreamworld) as part of a $40 million expansion. Construction started in mid 2022 along with Project Zero and opened 2 days before Christmas in 2023.

== Theming ==
The theming is based on two brothers named Tony and Terry who own a demolition business with an "affinity for TNT". The ride environment features elements of an active demolition site, including a tunnel and near miss effects designed to enhance the experience.

== Ride experience ==
Riders are first chainlifted up to a height of 17 meters and then a drop occurs that speeds riders up to 67kmh. The ride then goes through a tunnel before turning, giving some riders airtime. The coaster then goes through a hole in a wall and flies above the station, before doing a bunny hop before the end of the ride.

== Reception ==
The ride has been well-received and has been described as an "exciting, yet family-friendly, ride". It has a rating of 4 stars on Parkz.com. Critics have noted that there is a small capacity and the ride is too short, but it does not stop people riding the coaster. Critics have also noted that the coaster is smooth, fun and has comfy seating.
