= Kvasten =

Roller coaster at Gröna Lund

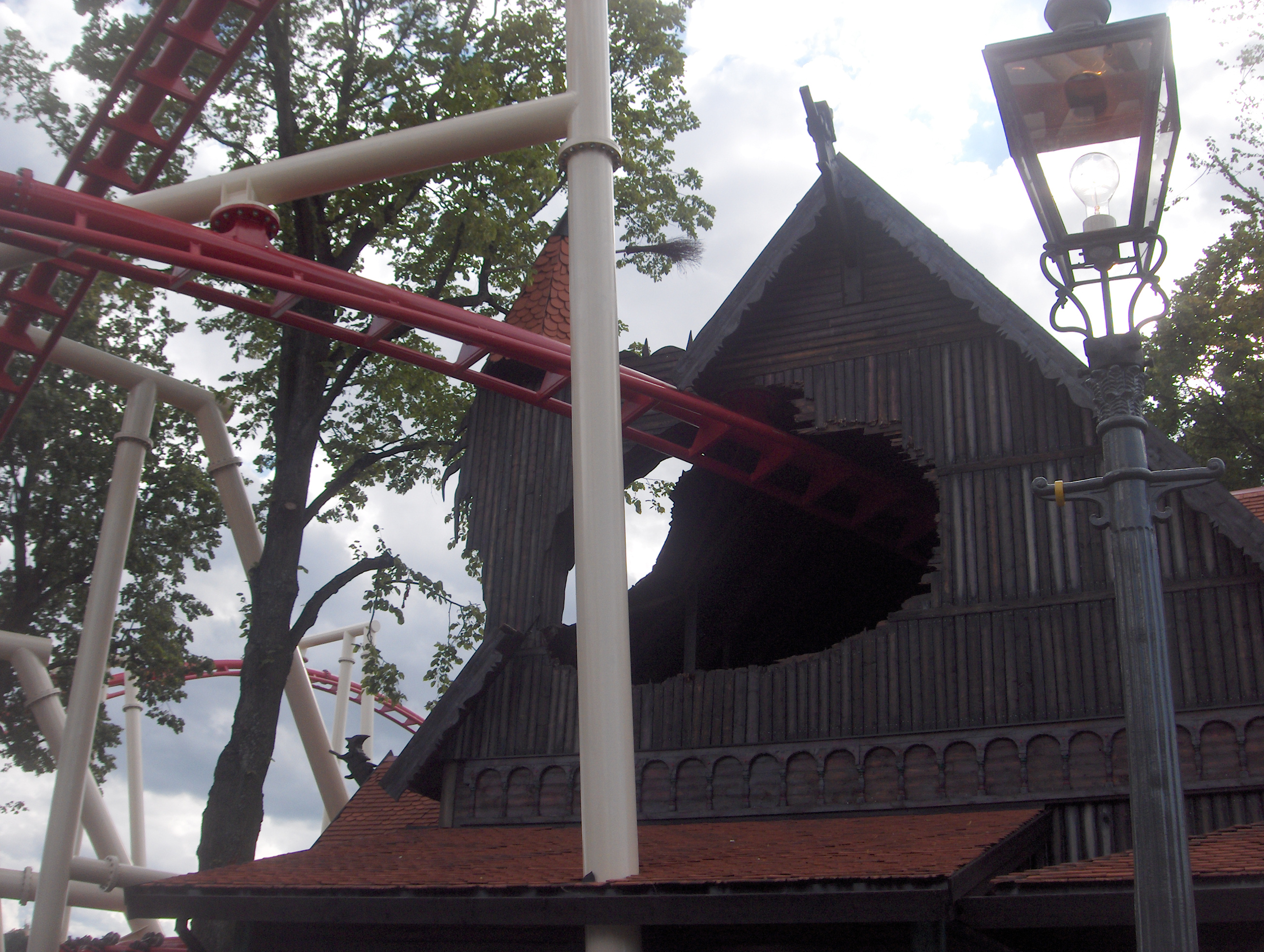

Gröna Lund
- Location: Gröna Lund
- Coordinates: 59.322555°N 18.096394°E
- Status: Operating
- Opening date: 28 April 2007
- Cost: KR 70,866,817

General statistics
- Type: Steel – Family – Inverted
- Manufacturer: Vekoma
- Model: Suspended Family Coaster (395m)
- Lift/launch system: Drive tire
- Height: 19.6 m (64 ft)
- Length: 395 m (1,296 ft)
- Speed: 55 km/h (34 mph)
- Inversions: 0
- Duration: 1:03
- Capacity: 758 riders per hour
- G-force: 2.5
- Height restriction: 110 cm (3 ft 7 in)
- Trains: Single train with 10 cars. Riders are arranged 2 across in a single row for a total of 20 riders per train.
- Kvasten at RCDB

Kvasten ("The Broom") is a steel inverted roller coaster at Gröna Lund in Stockholm, Sweden. The ride is a Suspended Family Coaster built by Vekoma. It opened on 28 April 2007.

The ride is 19.6 metres (64 ft) tall, 395 metres (1,296 ft) long, and operates at top speeds of 55 km/h (34 mph).
