= Suspended Family Coaster =

Roller coaster design by Vekoma

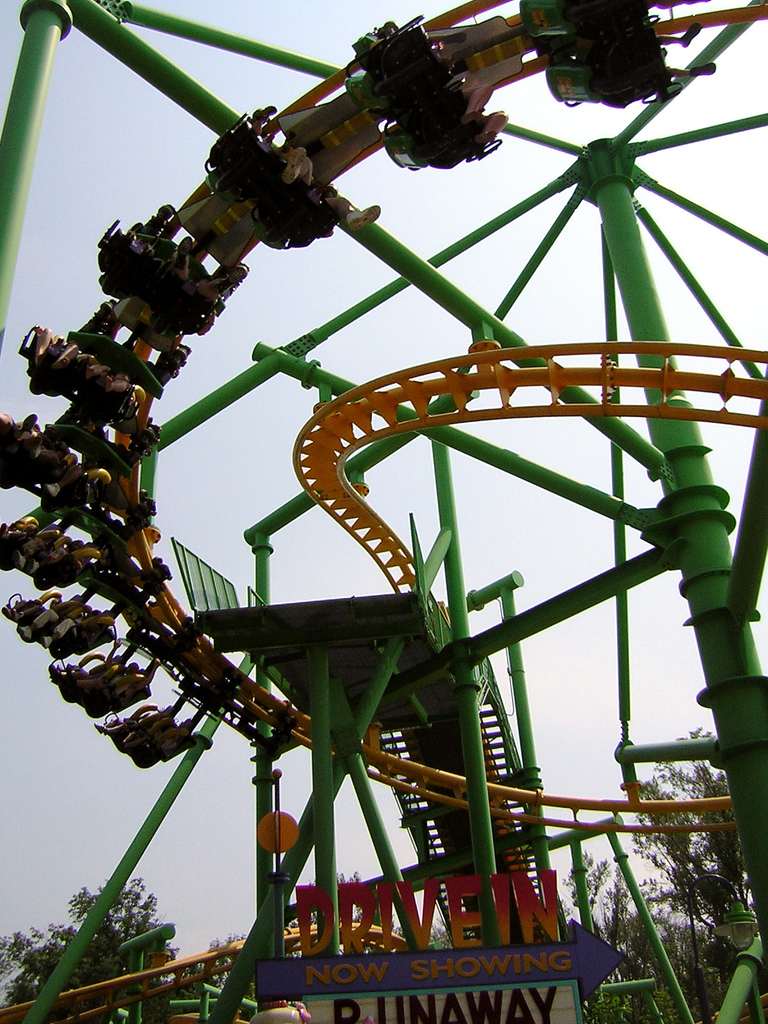
- Woodstock’s Air Rail (formerly Rugrats Runaway Reptar and Flying Ace Ariel Chase) at Kings Island was one of the first Family Inverted Coaster models.
- Status: In production
- First manufactured: 2001
- No. of installations: 29
- Manufacturers: Vekoma, S&S Sensei
- Type: Steel – Inverted – Family
- Models: 294 m, 342 m, 395 m, 453 m, 550m, and Custom
- Lift system: Drive tire
- Suspended Family Coaster at RCDB

A Suspended Family Coaster is a steel inverted roller coaster built by Vekoma designed for families with no inversions. Just like all inverted roller coasters the train runs under the track with the seats directly attached to the wheel carriage. This latter attribute is what sets it apart from the older suspended swinging coaster, which runs under the track, but "swings" via a pivoting bar attached to the wheel carriage.

== History ==
The Suspended Family Coaster debuted in 2001 with the Rugrats Runaway Reptar opening at Kings Island in Ohio, USA, and Silver Streak at sister park Canada's Wonderland. Several clones and variations have opened since.

The original designs featured trains with a safety system consisting of over-the-shoulder restraints. These restraints would lock into place with a belt-type connector which would be attached the seat base. All of the original track designs were of the 342m model with concrete footers.

In March 2007, Vekoma debuted a new version of the Suspended Family Coaster, the 294 m model. The first installation of this was Jimmy Neutron's Atomic Flyer at Movie Park Germany. The ride differs from previous Suspended Family Coasters because it has a portable base-frame beneath the track rather than concrete footers and features a new train style with fully padded seats that use lap bar restraints.

One month later in April 2007, the 395 m model was launched at Gröna Lund in Sweden. The ride, which was named Kvasten, features the same redesigned trains as Jimmy Neutron's Atomic Flyer. The ride also features a larger layout with a peak height of 20 metres (66 ft) and a length of 395 metres (1,296 ft).

== Models ==
Most models have one train, which has 10 cars with 2 seats on each car. This caters for up to 650 riders per hour. All of the models feature lift hills powered by tires and magnetic brake runs.

- 294 m — features a compact footprint where riders rise to 13 metres (43 ft) before completing a 48-second ride of turns and drops.
- 342 m — riders are taken up 14.8 metres (49 ft) and go through a tight helix, followed by a series of small turns and drops for a one-and-a-half-minute ride.
- 395 m — This model stands 20 metres (66 ft) above the ground and reaches speeds of up to 55 kilometres per hour (34 mph).
- 453 m — This model stands 19 metres (62 ft) above the ground and reaches speeds of up to 67 kilometres per hour (42 mph).
- 550 m — This model stands 23 metres (75 ft) above the ground and reaches speeds of up to 62.6 kilometres per hour (38.9 mph).

== Installations ==
Name	Amusement park	Location	Opening date	Model	Notes	Ref.
Adrena-Line	Six Flags Qiddiya City	Qiddiya City, Riyadh, Saudi Arabia	31 December 2025	Custom	Operates 2 trains	
Aurora	Hossoland	Brojce, Zachodniopomorskie, Poland	27 June 2025	395 m		
Bat	Lagoon Amusement Park	Farmington, Utah, United States	16 April 2005	342 m		
Big Top	Oriental Heritage Changsha	Ningxiang, Changsha, China	2019	453 m		
Dragonflier	Dollywood	Pigeon Forge, Tennessee, United States	2019	453 m		
Eagle Warrior	VinWonders Phú Quốc	Phú Quốc, Kiên Giang, Vietnam	1 June 2020	453 m		
Family Coaster	Children's Grand Park, Seoul	Seoul, South Korea	2014	395 m		
Flight of the Pterosaur	Paultons Park	Romsey, Hampshire, England	17 May 2016	395 m		
Flight of the Wicked Witch	Warner Bros. Movie World	Gold Coast, Queensland, Australia	20 December 2024	453 m		
Fire Mountain	Zigong Fantawild Dinosaur Kingdom	Da'an District, Zigong, China	2022	453 m		
Flying Fox	Kentucky Kingdom	Louisville, Kentucky, United States	28 May 2026	Custom		
Flying School formerly Swamp Thing	Legoland Florida	Winter Haven, Florida, United States	9 December 2004	342 m	Installed by Martin & Vleminckx	
Freedom Flyer	Fun Spot America	Orlando, Florida, United States	May 2013	395 m		
Insomnio	Kataplum	Mexico City, Mexico	1 November 2018	395 m		
Jimmy Neutron's Atomic Flyer	Movie Park Germany	Bottrop, North Rhine-Westphalia, Germany	March 2007	294 m		
Kenny's Forest Flyer	Dreamworld	Gold Coast, Queensland, Australia	26 December 2002	342 m		
Kiddy Hawk	Carowinds	Charlotte, North Carolina, United States	22 March 2003	342 m		
Kvasten	Gröna Lund	Stockholm, Sweden	28 April 2007	395 m		
Orkanen	Fårup Sommerland	Jylland, Denmark	5 June 2013	453 m		
Orochi	Parc du Bocasse	Le Bocasse, Normandy, France	1 July 2021	453 m		
Phoenix	Deno's Wonder Wheel Amusement Park	Brooklyn, New York, United States	2 July 2021	375 m		
Roller Coaster	Galaxy	Kyiv, Ukraine	2016	375 m		
Serpentikah	Aztlán Parque Urbano	Mexico City, Mexico	25 March 2025	550 m	Operates 3 trains	
Silver Streak	Canada's Wonderland	Vaughan, Ontario, Canada	6 May 2001	342 m		
Sky Hawk	Six Flags Great America	Gurnee, Illinois, United States	2027	375 m		
Suspended Family Coaster	Happy Valley Nanjing	Qixia District, Nanjing, China	11 November 2020	453 m		
Steel Lasso	Frontier City	Oklahoma City, Oklahoma, United States	18 July 2008	294 m		
Swamp Thing	Wild Adventures	Valdosta, Georgia, United States	10 May 2003	342 m		
TNT	Gumbuya world	Tyrong North, Victoria, Australia	23 December 2023	453m		
Woodstock’s Air Rail	Kings Island	Mason, Ohio, United States	7 April 2001	342 m		

== Gallery ==
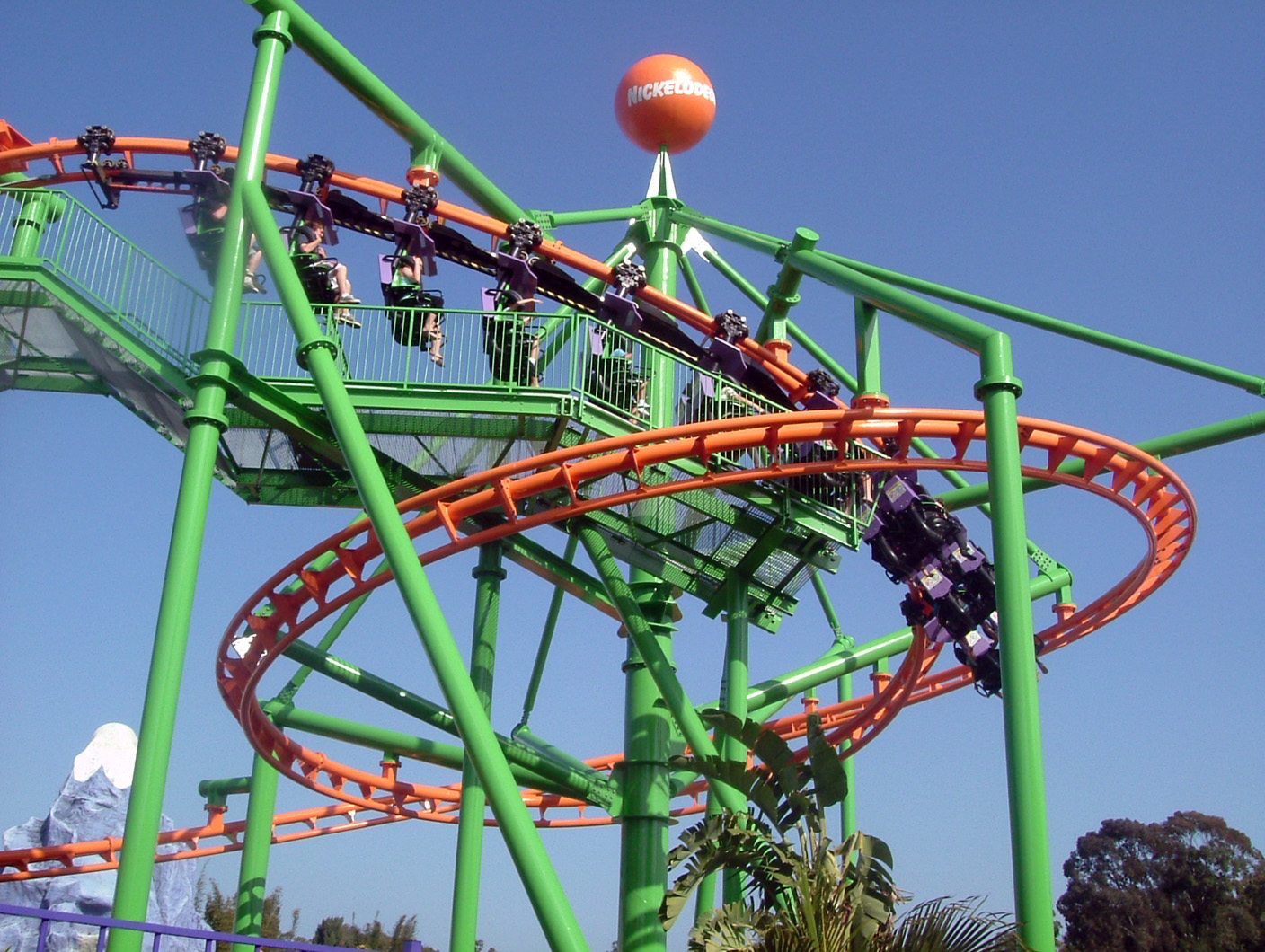
Kenny's Forest Flyer at Dreamworld is a standard 342 m (1,122 ft) model.

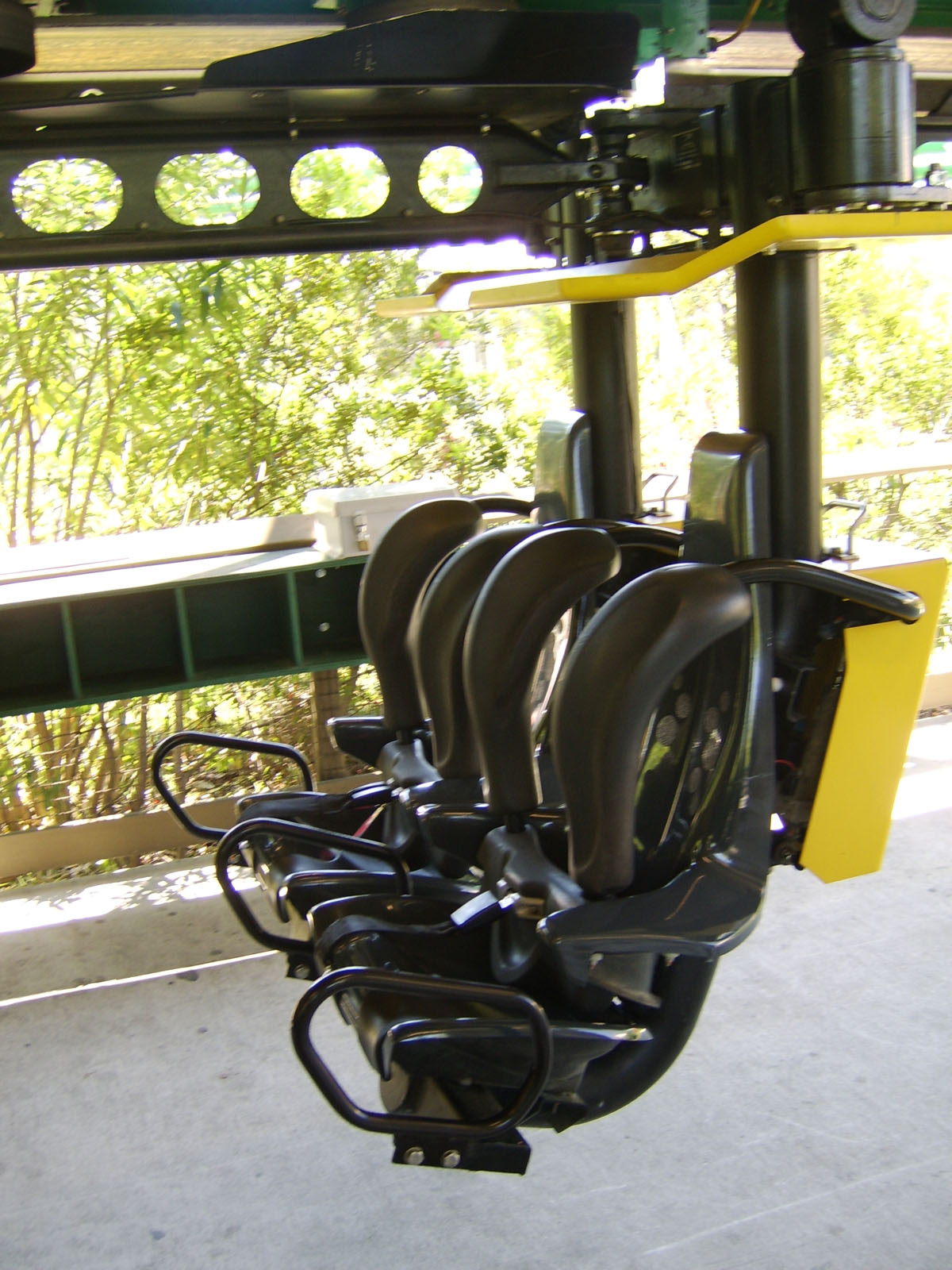
A car from Swamp Thing at Wild Adventures.

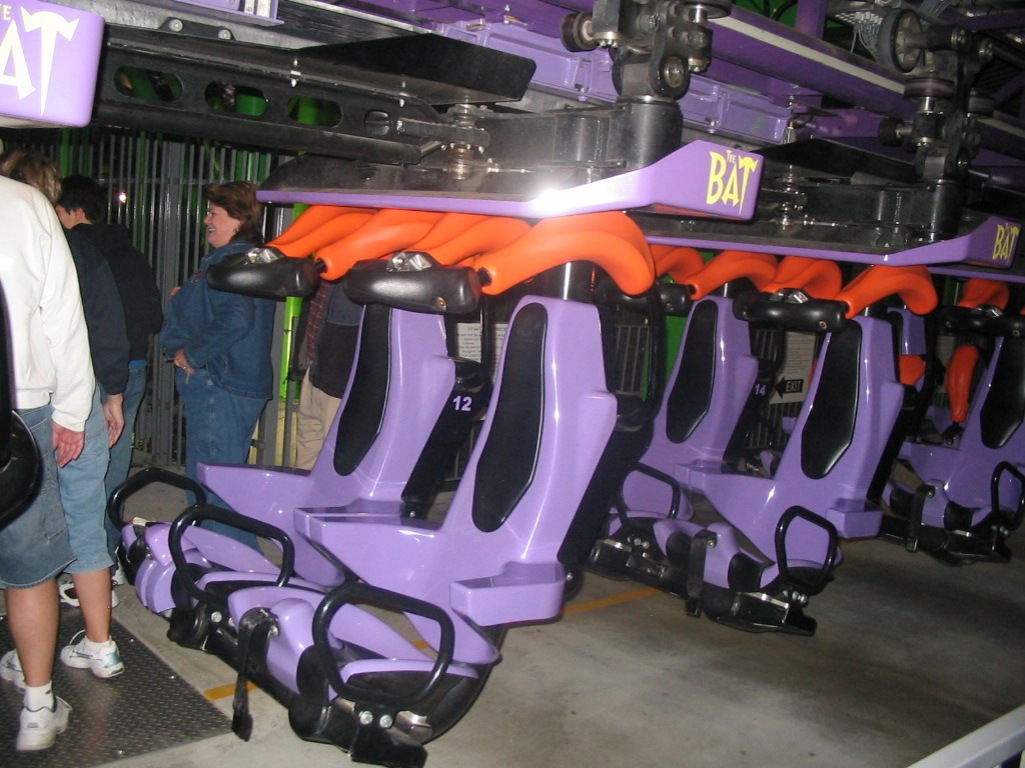
Roller coaster train for the Bat at the Lagoon Amusement Park.

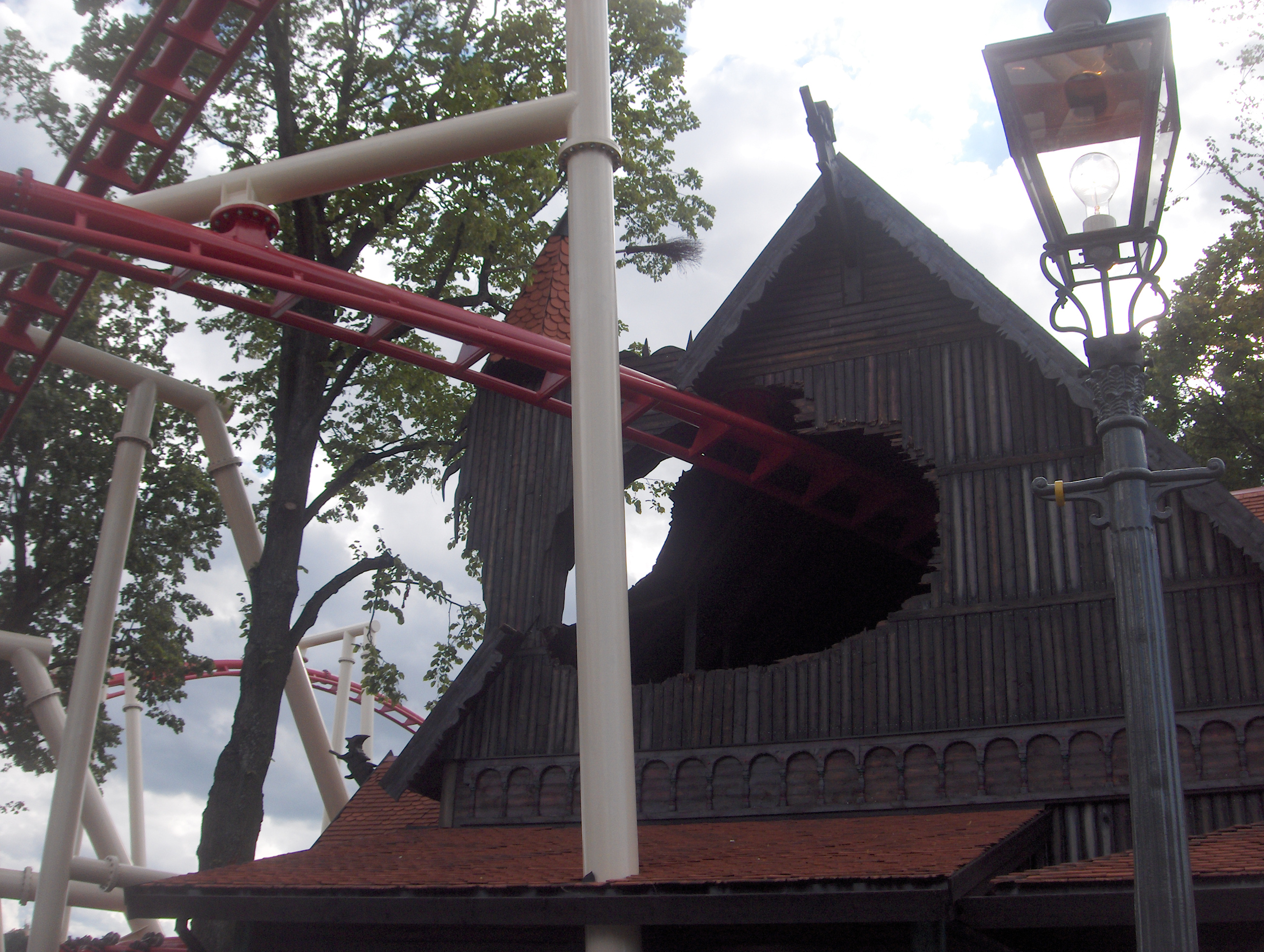
Kvasten at Gröna Lund is the first 395m model in operation.
