= X-Coaster =

Roller coaster

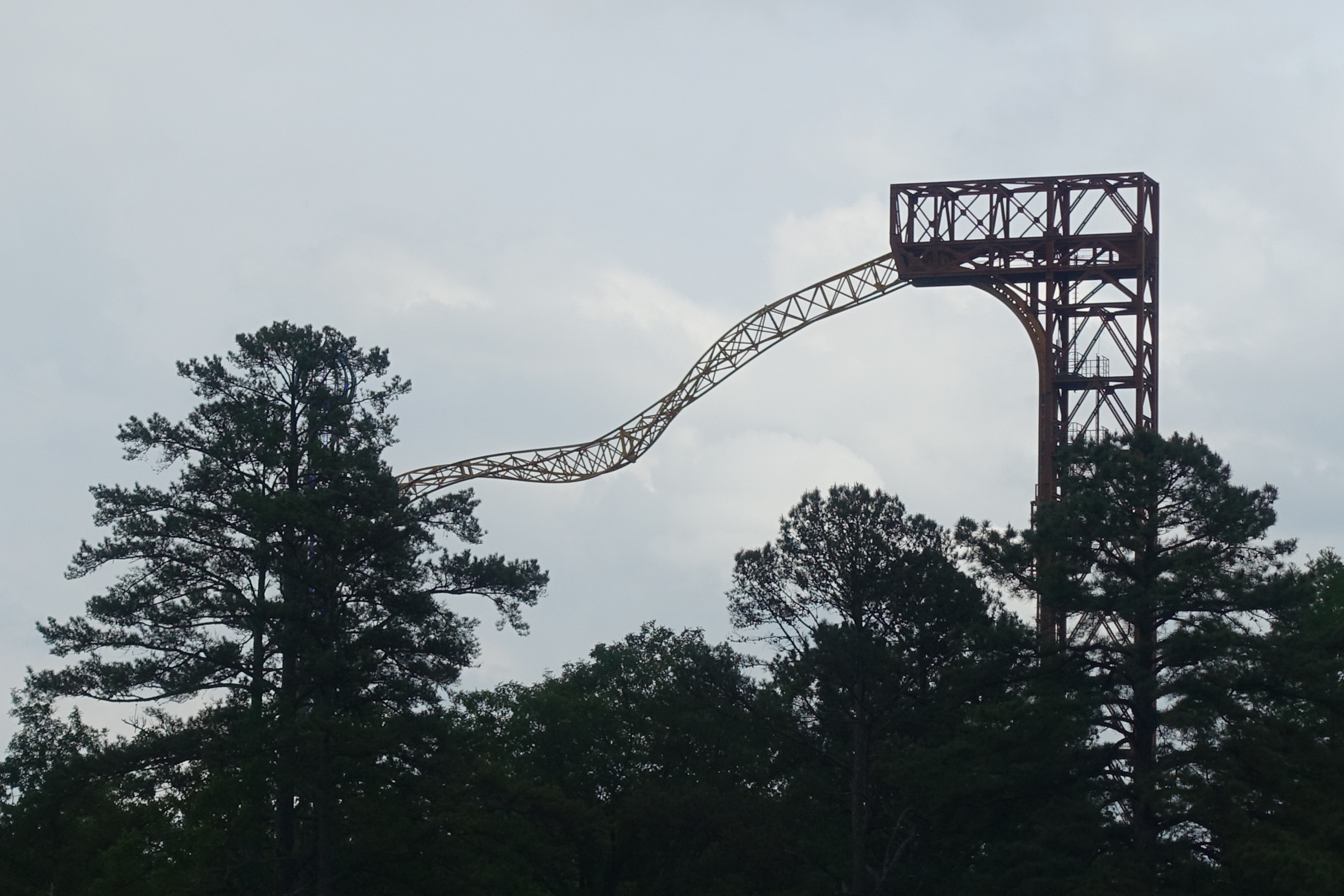

Magic Springs and Crystal Falls
- Location: Magic Springs and Crystal Falls
- Coordinates: 34.517867°N 93.015141°W
- Status: Operating
- Opening date: May 27, 2006
- Cost: US$4 million

General statistics
- Type: Steel
- Manufacturer: Maurer AG
- Model: SkyLoop XT-150
- Height: 150 ft (46 m)
- Drop: 150 ft (46 m)
- Length: 492 ft (150 m)
- Speed: 65 mph (105 km/h)
- Capacity: 500 riders per hour
- Height restriction: 52 in (132 cm)
- Trains: Single train with 2 cars. Riders are arranged 2 across in 3 rows for a total of 12 riders per train.
- X-Coaster at RCDB

X-Coaster is a Maurer Söhne SkyLoop XT-150 roller coaster at Magic Springs and Crystal Falls in Hot Springs, Arkansas.

== History ==
X-Coaster opened at Magic Springs on May 27, 2006 and became the park's 6th coaster and the first of its kind in North America. X-Coaster was closed during the entire 2009 season, before reopening in 2010. Although Maurer Söhne is considered the manufacturer of the ride, the track for X-Coaster was fabricated by Dynamic Structures, and the ride was constructed by Martin & Vleminckx.

On October 5, 2012, Magic Springs and Crystal Falls announced that X-Coaster will be removed at the end of the 2012 season and that they plan on expanding Crystal Falls water park in 2013. Despite this, however, the ride has continued operation into the 2013 season with its removal being delayed.

== Ride experience ==
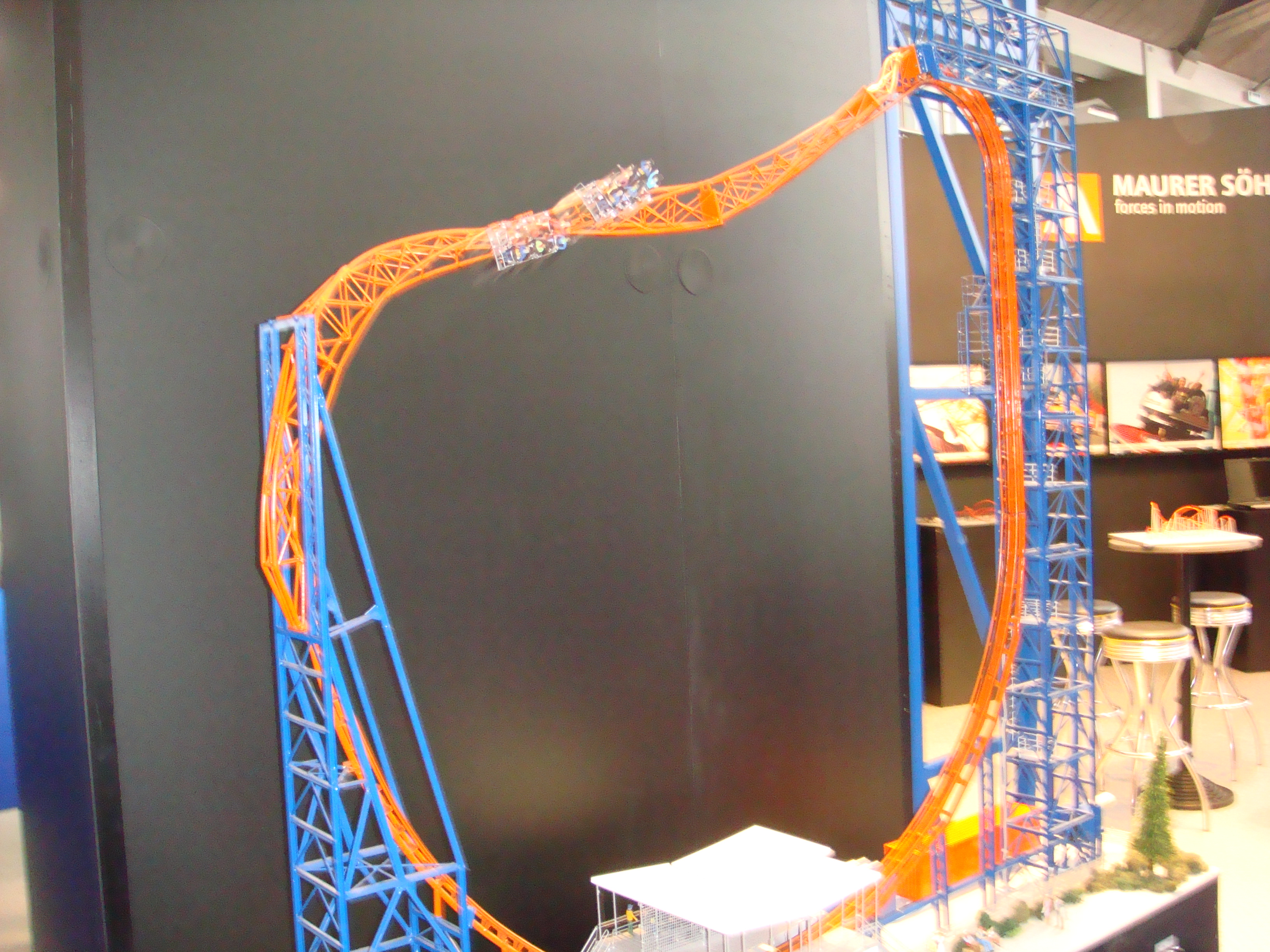
A model of X-Coaster.

After the train departs from the station, it immediately begins to climb the vertical (90 degree) lift hill. Upon reaching the top of the lift, the train turns 45 degrees backwards putting the train and its riders in an upside down position. Then, as the train exits the lift, it goes through a heartline roll before going down the only drop in the layout of the roller coaster. The train speeds through the station going back up the lift. Once it lost momentum the train then returns down passing through the station again. It then proceeds back up the drop and partially into the heartline roll before once again losing momentum and returning to the ground. After passing the station for the third time, the train is stopped near the top of the lift hill. The train is then lowered back down to the station where the next riders board the ride. The XT 150 has the option of sending riders around a second cycle at the operator's discretion. When the train stopped on the lift hill at the end of the ride, instead of lowering slowly back to the station, the chain would raise the car up and send it through the ride again.
