= Universal's Superstar Parade =

Defunct parade at Universal Studios Florida

Universal Studios Florida
- Status: Removed
- Opening date: May 8, 2012; 14 years ago
- Closing date: June 4, 2022; 4 years ago
- Replaced by: Universal Mega Movie Parade

Ride statistics
- Attraction type: Parade
- Designer: Universal Orlando's Entertainment Division
- Theme: Despicable Me; Hop; The Secret Life of Pets; SpongeBob SquarePants; Dora the Explorer; Go, Diego, Go! Paw Patrol; The Loud House (franchise)

Universal's Superstar Parade was a parade at Universal Studios Florida. It was first announced at a live webcast on January 25, 2012. The parade included characters, floats, and themed-vehicles based on Universal Pictures and Illumination Entertainment's Despicable Me and Hop films, as well as Paramount and Nickelodeon's SpongeBob SquarePants, Dora the Explorer, and Go, Diego, Go! television series. Each section of the parade had a unique mix of performers, from aerialists to drummers to acrobatics. The parade was notable for having “show stops” in the New York and Hollywood sections of the park where an elaborate choreographed dance routine would take place. Leading up to the parade, each individual unit would make appearances throughout the day for smaller street shows and meet-n-greets. The parade debuted on May 8, 2012, as part of Universal Orlando's "Year To Be Here".

In November 2016, Universal announced that the Hop unit would be replaced by Illumination Entertainment's The Secret Life of Pets-themed floats. This unit introduced break dancers performing stunts, bicyclists, and puppets of the film’s main characters.

== Characters featured in the parade ==
=== Despicable Me (2012–2022) ===
- Gru
- Margo
- Edith
- Agnes
- Vector
- The Minions

=== SpongeBob SquarePants (2012–2018) ===
- SpongeBob SquarePants
- Patrick Star
- Squidward Tentacles
- The Bikini Bottomites

=== Paw Patrol (2018–2022) ===
- Chase
- Marshall
- Rubble
- Rocky

=== Hop (2012–2016) ===
- E.B.
- Mr. Bunny
- Carlos
- Phil
- The Pink Berets

=== The Secret Life of Pets (2016–2022) ===
- Max
- Duke
- Gidget
- Snowball

=== Dora the Explorer (2012–2020) ===
- Dora the Explorer
- Boots
- Diego
- Baby Jaguar

=== The Loud House (franchise) (2020–2022) ===
- Lincoln Loud
- Lori Loud
- Leni Loud
- Luna Loud
- Luan Loud
- Lynn Jr. Loud
- Lucy Loud
- Lana Loud
- Lola Loud
- Lisa Loud
- Lily Loud
- Clyde McBride
- Girl Jordan

== Closure ==
Following a week of rumors, Universal officially announced the parade's ending date on May 18, 2022. The parade ended its 10-year run with its last performance on June 4, 2022. The final performance utilized an additional float from the theme park's Mardi Gras parade, to allow additional Universal team-members to participate in the festivities.

The individual parade units continued to do meet-n-greets and street shows in the park after the parade's closure, with The Secret Life of Pets’ last appearance on August 13, 2022, and The Loud House, PAW Patrol and Despicable Me units closing on September 10, 2022.

Universal's Superstar Parade's replacement, Universal Mega Movie Parade, debuted on July 3, 2024. This parade features characters, floats, and performers based on Back to the Future, Sing, Minions, Kung Fu Panda, Trolls, Ghostbusters, E.T. the Extra-Terrestrial, Jaws, and Jurassic World.

== Legacy ==
A performance of this parade in January 2016 led to the "Dabbing Squidward" meme. The original Vine video of a Universal team-member dabbing inside a Squidward Tentacles mascot costume garnered 22 million views within a week. The video led to widespread virality, and even officially-licensed merchandise of the meme by Nickelodeon.

== See also ==
- 2012 in amusement parks
- 2022 in amusement parks
