= SkyLoop =

Steel roller coaster

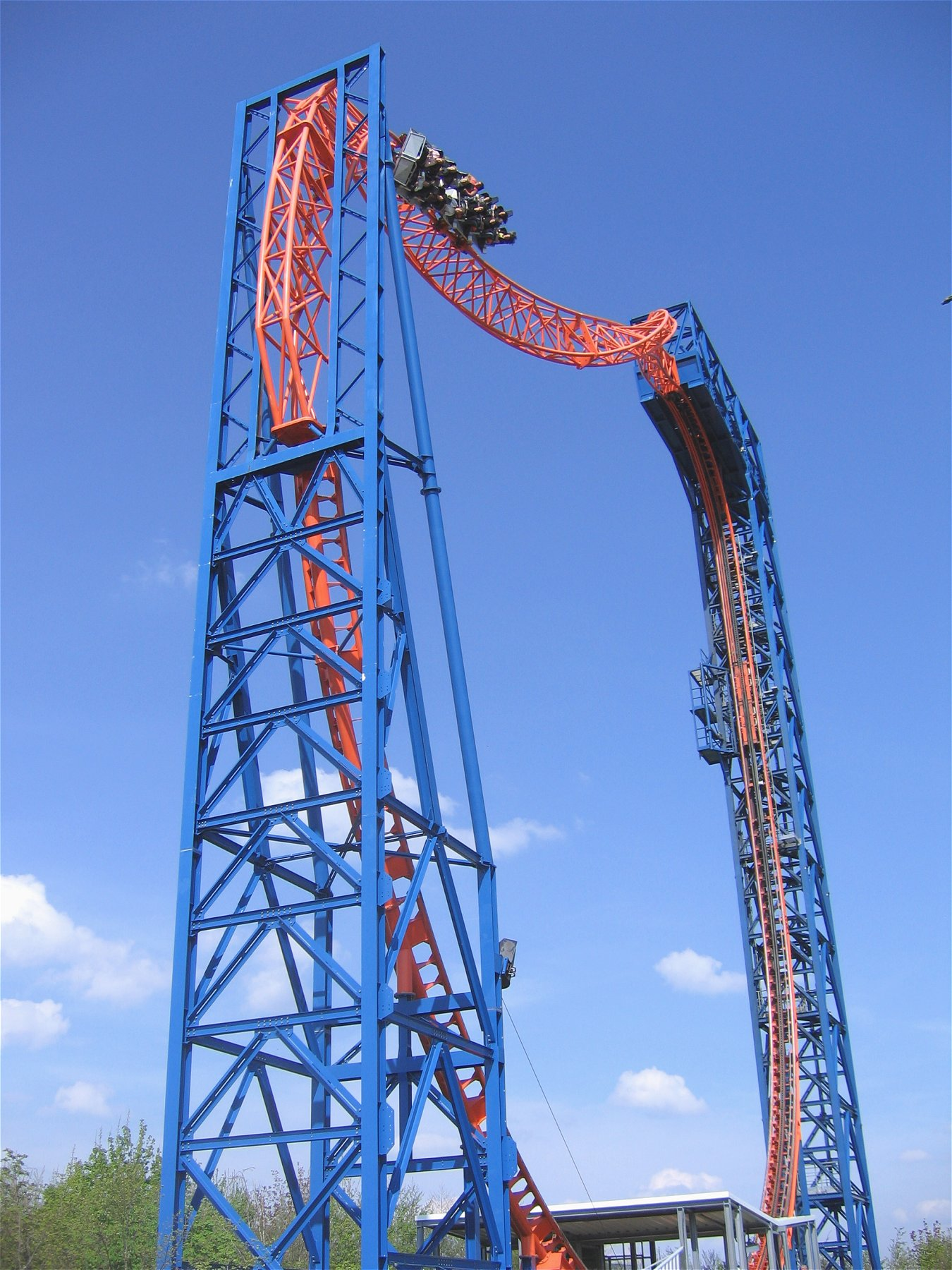
- Sky Wheel at Skyline Park in Germany.
- Status: In production
- First manufactured: 2004
- No. of installations: 10
- Manufacturer: Maurer AG
- Vehicle type: X-Car
- Vehicles: 2
- Riders per vehicle: 6
- Rows: 6
- Riders per row: 2
- Restraint Style: Lap bar
- SkyLoop at RCDB

SkyLoop is a type of steel roller coaster manufactured by Maurer AG. There are currently 10 SkyLoops operating worldwide, nine of which are identical XT 150 models, and one of which is an extended XT 450 model. The first SkyLoop to open was Sky Wheel in 2004 (XT 150) while the sole XT 450, Abismo, opened in 2006. There are also three other models—XT 900, Custom, and Launch—which have no installations as of 2021.

== History ==
The world's first SkyLoop, Sky Wheel, opened in 2004 and is currently located at Skyline Park in Germany. Sky Wheel is a XT 150 model. This would continue to be the only model of the SkyLoop to be built until 2006 when Abismo at Parque de Atracciones de Madrid in Spain was built. Abismo is a SkyLoop XT 450 (an extension to the XT 150) and remains the only XT 450 to have been built. Since then, only XT 150's have been built around the world. Maurer Söhne also have 3 additional models of the SkyLoop: XT 900 (extension to XT 150), Custom, and Launch (uses the XT 150 layout where the train gets launched up the lift hill), although none have been built as of 2020.

== Models ==
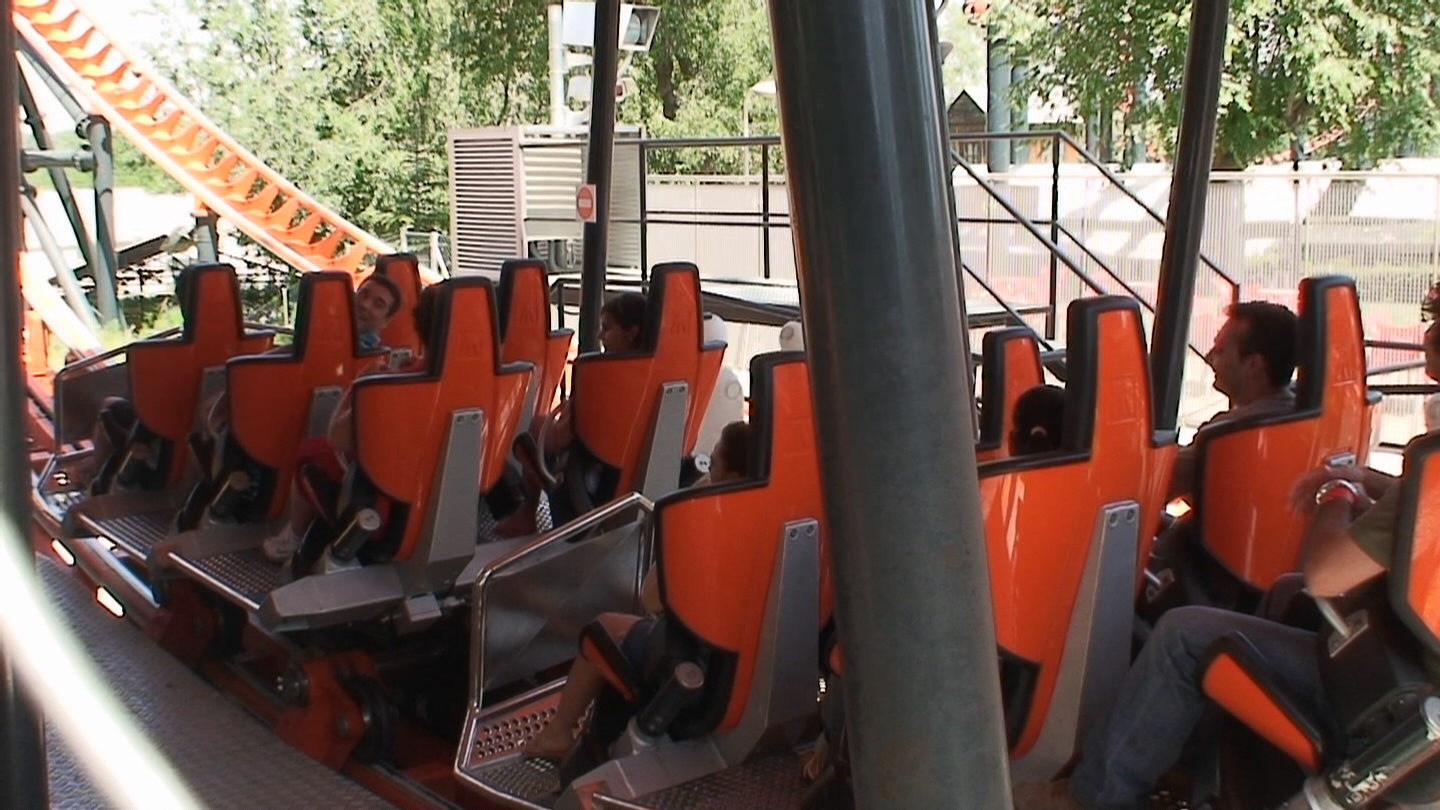
The trains used on SkyLoops are the same for all models. The train on Abismo is pictured.

The SkyLoop consists of five models: XT 150, XT 450, XT 900, Custom, and Launch. However, only the XT 150 and XT 450 have been produced, and only one version of the latter has been constructed as of 2012.

=== XT 150 ===
SkyLoop XT 150 is a 492-foot-long (150 m) roller coaster that reaches a maximum height of 171 feet (52 m) (the actual track reaches 164 feet (50 m)) and a top speed of 65 miles per hour (105 km/h). This model also has two inversions and uses a single train featuring 2 X-Cars that seat 6 people each.

After the train departs from the station, it immediately begins to climb the vertical (90 degree) lift hill. Upon reaching the top of the lift, the train turns 45 degrees backwards putting the train and its riders in an upside down position. Then, as the train exits the lift, it goes through a heartline roll before going down the only drop in the layout of the roller coaster. The train speeds through the station going back up the lift. Once it loses momentum the train then returns down passing through the station again. It then proceeds back up the drop and partially into the heartline roll before once again losing momentum and returning to the ground. After passing the station for the third time, the train is stopped near the top of the lift hill. It is then lowered back down to the station where the next riders board the train. The XT 150 has the option of sending riders around a second cycle at the operator's discretion. When the train stops on the lift hill at the end of the ride, instead of lowering slowly back to the station, the chain will raise the car up and send it through the ride again.

=== XT 450 ===
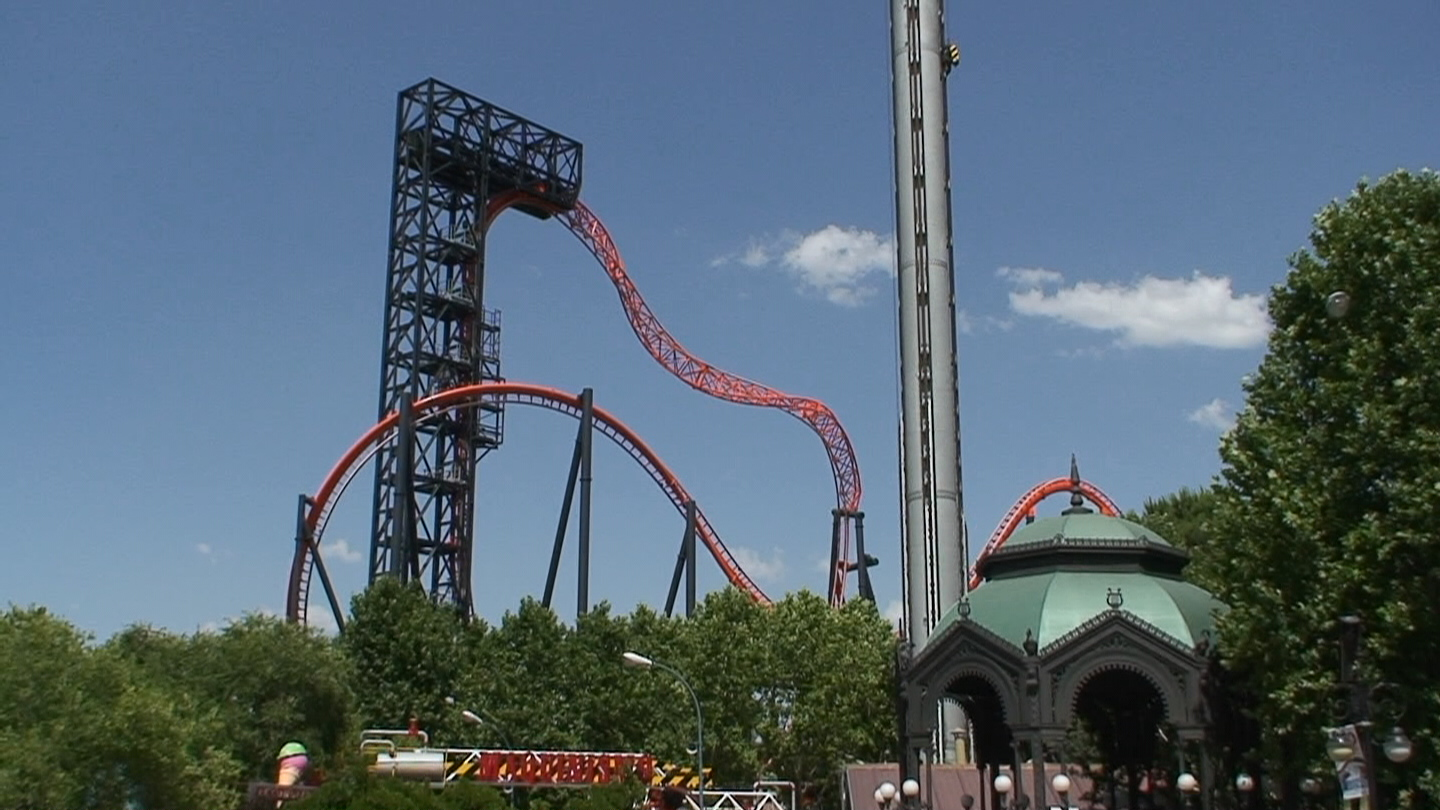
Abismo is the only installation of an XT 450

SkyLoop XT 450 is a 1,476-foot-long (450 m) roller coaster that reaches a maximum height of 170.6 feet (52.0 m) (the actual track reaches 160.7 feet (49.0 m)) and a top speed of 65 miles per hour (105 km/h). This model is an extension of the XT 150, and the beginning track is of the same design. The XT 450 has 4 inversions and also uses a train made up of 2 X-Cars that seat 6 people each.

The roller coaster begins the same way that the XT 150 model does. After the train departs from the station, it immediately begins to climb the vertical (90 degree) lift hill. Upon reaching the top of the lift, the train turns 45 degrees backwards putting the train and its riders in an upside down position. After, as the train exits the lift, it goes through a heartline roll. The train enters the first drop where it reaches its maximum speed of 65 miles per hour (105 km/h) before traversing a tight left overbanked turn. After the turn, the train goes over the only camelback hill followed by another left overbanked turn. The train then follows a flat section of track before going down a small drop leading into the station and back up the lift where the train stops. The train is then lowered back down to the station where the next riders board the ride.

=== XT 900 ===
SkyLoop XT 900 is a concept that has yet to be built as of 2020. The design of model begins the same way as the XT 150 does as the lift, first inversion, and first drop are all present in both models. Along with the elements from the XT 150 model, the XT 900 includes a series of turns, overbanked turns, a loop, and a cobra roll.

=== Custom ===
SkyLoop Custom is a concept that also has yet to be built as of 2020. The design of this model is based on the SkyLoop XT 150 with an extension of what the particular amusement park wants. Roller coasters of this model can vary from one another.

=== Launch ===
SkyLoop Launch is a concept that has also yet to be built as of 2020. This design can be incorporated with the XT 150, 450, 900, and Custom models as the "launch" takes place where the normal lift would be. The top speed of the launch would be 27 miles per hour (43 km/h) and is driven by linear synchronous motors (LSM). If this concept were to be built, not only would it have the world's highest inversion, but also the world's highest vertical launch.

== Installations ==
Maurer AG has built ten SkyLoops as of 2020. Nine are SkyLoop XT 150s while one is a SkyLoop XT 450. The roller coasters are listed in order of opening dates.

Name	Park	Country	Model	Opened	Status
Sky Wheel	Skyline Park	Germany	XT 150	2004	Operating
X-Coaster	Magic Springs and Crystal Falls	United States	XT 150	May 27, 2006	Operating
Abismo	Parque de Atracciones de Madrid	Spain	XT 450	June 27, 2006	Operating
Ukko	Linnanmäki	Finland	XT 150	May 27, 2011	Operating
Clouds of Fairyland	World Joyland	China	XT 150	August 5, 2011	Operating
Hidden Anaconda	Happy Valley (Wuhan)	China	XT 150	April 29, 2012	Operating
Terror Twister	Fantawild Adventure (Zhengzhou)	China	XT 150	October 1, 2012	Operating
Terror Twister	Fantawild Dream Park	China	XT 150	March 28, 2013	Operating
Terror Twister	Nantong Adventure Land	China	XT 150	March 29, 2013	Operating
Project Zero; Formerly BuzzSaw	Gumbuya World; Dreamworld	Australia	XT 150	December 23, 2022; September 17, 2011 to August 31, 2021	Operating

== Similar rides ==
Premier Rides has installed several versions of the Sky Rocket II model, which is similar to the SkyLoop; these include Superman: Ultimate Flight. In addition, several Chinese SkyLoops have been made.
