= Themeparks LLC =

American theme park company

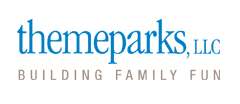
- Company type: LLC
- Industry: Amusement park owner and operator
- Founder: Ed Hart
- Headquarters: 1401 Bardstown Road, Louisville, Kentucky, U.S.
- Number of locations: 2
- Area served: United States
- Key people: Ed Hart Chairman & CEO

Themeparks LLC, later known as Kentucky Kingdom LLLP, was an American company that operated two amusement parks. The company was originally formed as "227 Plus One" in the late 1980s by Ed Hart and is based in Louisville, Kentucky. Themeparks' first park was Kentucky Kingdom, which it bought in 1989 and sold to Premier Parks (which became Six Flags) in 1997. Themeparks subsequently operated Magic Springs Theme Park in Hot Springs, Arkansas from 2000 to 2008 before selling it to PARC Management. Themeparks LLC repurchased Kentucky Kingdom in 2013 and operated the amusement park from 2014 to 2020. In February 2021, Kentucky Kingdom was sold to Herschend Family Entertainment.

== History ==
=== The first decade (1989–2008) ===
In early April 1989, businessman Ed Hart bought the then-bankrupt Kentucky Kingdom amusement park's operating rights in a contract with the Kentucky State Fair Board. Hart then turned the park around and reopened it for the 1990 season. During this time, Hart founded Themeparks LLC specifically for the project.

On September 26, 1997, Themeparks LLC announced that Kentucky Kingdom would be sold to Premier Parks for $64 million, the deal was finalized on November 7. In 1998, Premier Parks purchased Six Flags Theme Parks from Time Warner, Kentucky Kingdom became Six Flags Kentucky Kingdom on June 21, 1998.

In the late 1990s, Hart was approached by Fitraco, a Belgian company, to reopen Magic Springs amusement park in Arkansas. Hart then reassembled and restarted Themeparks LLC, only one year after it dissolved after the sale of Kentucky Kingdom to Premier Parks (now Six Flags). Hart and Themeparks LLC then reopened the park on May 27, 2000, after five years being closed. During Themeparks LLC's operations at Magic Springs, attendance grew to new highs, after the additions of Crystal Falls Water Park and the Timberwood Amphitheater.

In October 2002, the company made a bid for VisionLand, a theme park in Bessemer, Alabama, but the price was too high.

Themeparks LLC sold Magic Springs and Crystal Falls to PARC Management in June 2008. Themeparks LLC then dissolved for a second time afterwards.

=== Return to Kentucky Kingdom (2010–2021) ===
In 2010, Themeparks LLC temporarily renamed itself to KK Redevelopment LLC to buy back Kentucky Kingdom from the state of Kentucky. In late 2011, The Kentucky State Fair Board ended their plans with KK Redevelopment LLC to reopen Kentucky Kingdom, after they failed to reach a lease agreement by a September 30 deadline. On October 19, 2012, KK Redevelopment LLC submitted a new proposal to reopen the park, the proposal included $50 million in startup funding and $70 million over the term of a lease with the state.

On January 24, 2013, The Fair Board approved the proposal from KK Redevelopment LLC and Ed Hart to reopen Kentucky Kingdom. The park (along with Hurricane Bay) was set to reopen on May 24, 2014, with new thrill rides and a bigger water park. Kentucky Kingdom and Hurricane Bay is now open with Themeparks LLC as the new operators. They spent over 50 million dollars to bring back Kentucky Kingdom and during the first year of operation. Theme Park LLC added a $7 million roller coaster named Lightning Run and doubled the size of the water park. Though Themeparks LLC does operate Kentucky Kingdom, the company was commonly referred to as Kentucky Kingdom LLLP when relating to Kentucky Kingdom.

On February 23, 2021, at a press conference attended by Kentucky governor Andy Beshear and Louisville mayor Greg Fischer, it was announced that the operating rights to Kentucky Kingdom had been sold to Herschend Family Entertainment, a Georgia-based company that operated three theme parks.

=== Proposed amusement parks ===
After selling Kentucky Kingdom to Premier Parks in 1997, Hart began planning to build a brand new amusement park near Seattle, Washington, which was to be called "The Great Northwest Theme Park". The park was to be 100 acres and be located in the town of Lakewood. It was planned to open in the Spring of 2002. However, the project was scrapped for unknown reasons.

In the early 2000s, Hart and Themeparks LLC began developing a new theme and water park, which was to be called Thrillopolis, and to be located in Nashville, Tennessee. Nashville's only amusement park, Opryland USA, had previously closed permanently several years prior in 1997 and was replaced by a shopping mall in 2000. The closest amusement park to Nashville at this time was Dollywood in Pigeon Forge, Tennessee. On June 17, 2002, Hart announced that Thrillopolis would not be built in Nashville, due to funding issues with the local government. In late 2002, Themeparks LLC did try to find property for Thrillopolis in Wilson County, Tennessee, even signing an exclusivity agreement with Wilson County on October 15, 2002. However, by the mid-2000s, plans to open Thrillopolis had been canceled.

== Properties ==
Former

- Kentucky Kingdom (1990–1997), (2014–2021)
- Magic Springs and Crystal Falls (2000–2008)

Proposed

- The Great Northwest Theme Park
- Thrillopolis
