= Green Lantern: First Flight (roller coaster) =

Defunct ride at Six Flags Magic Mountain

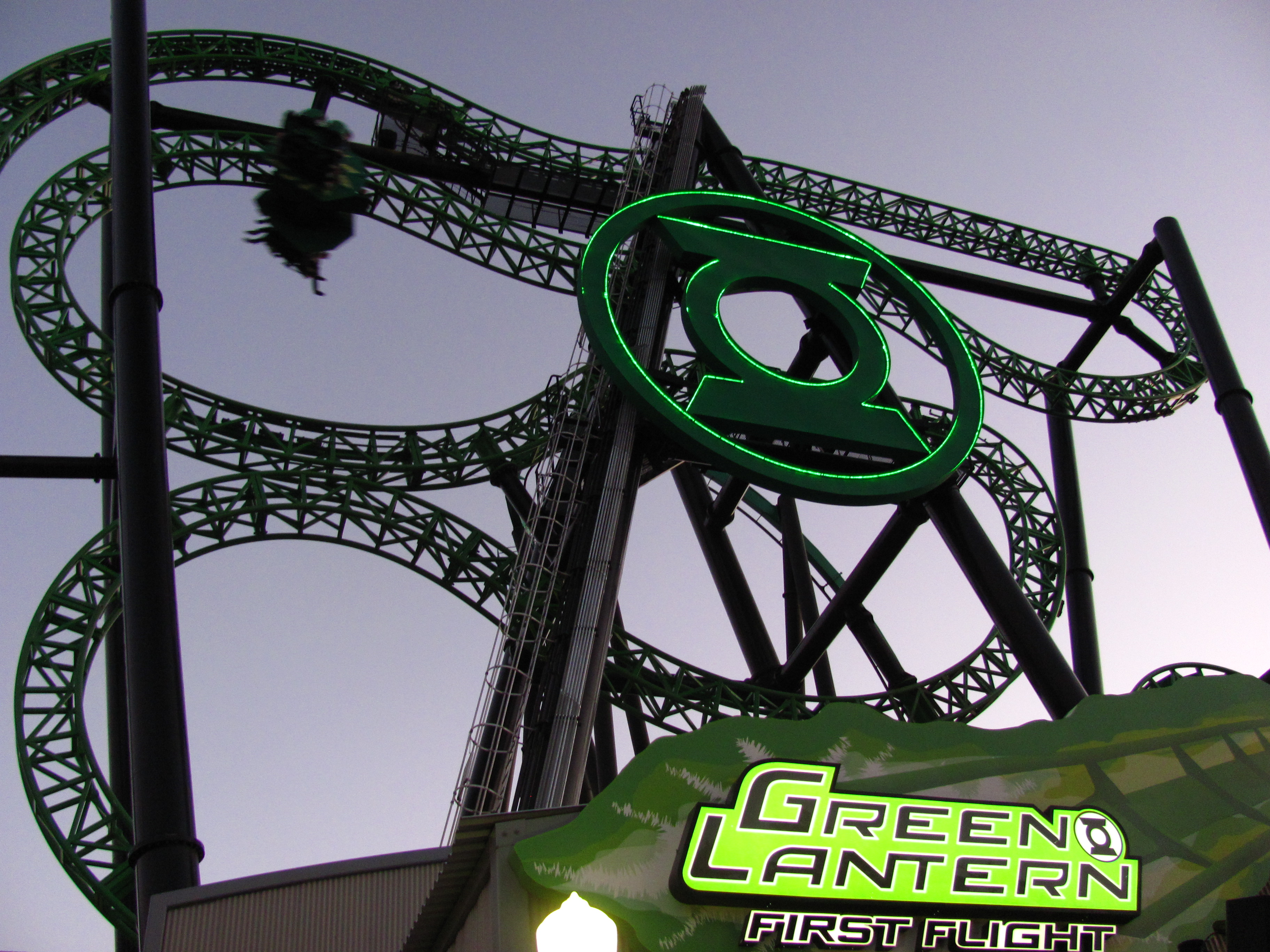

Six Flags Magic Mountain
- Location: Six Flags Magic Mountain
- Park section: DC Universe
- Coordinates: 34.4254695°N 118.5999082°W
- Status: Removed
- Opening date: July 1, 2011
- Closing date: July 2017
- Replaced by: Wonder Woman Flight of Courage

General statistics
- Type: Steel – 4th Dimension – Wing Coaster
- Manufacturer: Intamin
- Model: ZacSpin
- Lift/launch system: Vertical chain lift hill
- Height: 105 ft (32 m)
- Length: 810.4 ft (247.0 m)
- Speed: 34.2 mph (55.0 km/h)
- Inversions: 0
- Height restriction: 52–77 in (132–196 cm)
- Trains: 5 trains with a single car. Riders are arranged 4 across in 2 rows for a total of 8 riders per train.
- Must transfer from wheelchair
- Green Lantern: First Flight at RCDB

Green Lantern: First Flight was a steel roller coaster formerly located at Six Flags Magic Mountain in Valencia, California, United States. The ZacSpin model from Intamin was the first of its kind in the US when it opened on July 1, 2011. Its debut allowed Magic Mountain to reclaim its status of having the most roller coasters in the world.

Green Lantern closed abruptly in 2017 and remained inactive until its removal in 2019. It was moved to La Ronde amusement park in Montreal, Quebec, Canada, where it was set to reopen as Vipère in 2020. As a result of extended closures and limited park operation due to the COVID-19 pandemic, Vipère's opening was indefinitely delayed. In 2022, La Ronde made the decision to cancel the coaster's installation.

== History ==
=== Six Flags Magic Mountain (2011–2019) ===
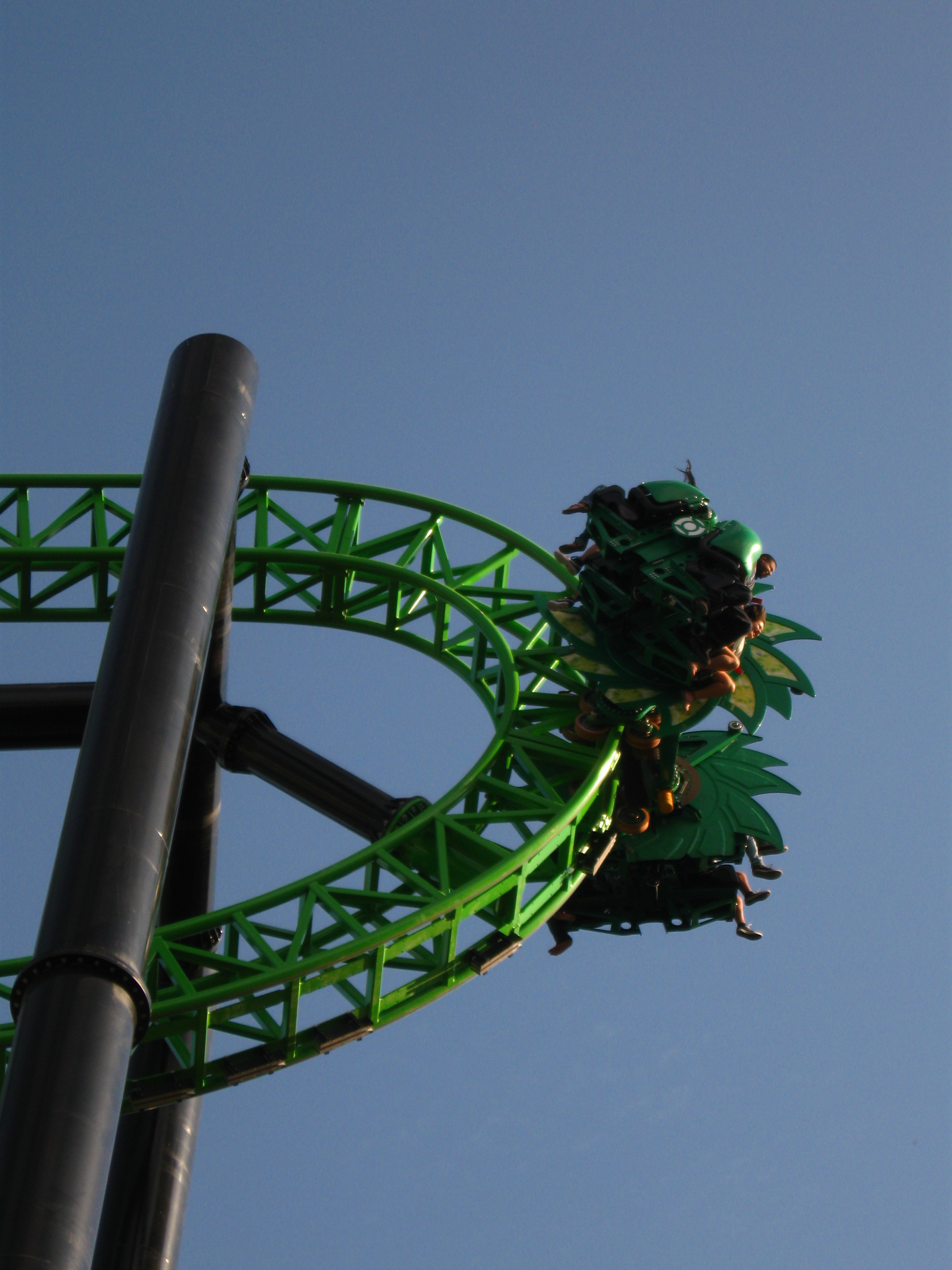
One of Green Lantern's trains on its first vertical hairpin turn

On October 20, 2010, six days after a leaked video revealed plans for a new roller coaster at Six Flags Magic Mountain, Six Flags officially confirmed that Green Lantern: First Flight would open in spring of 2011. The new coaster, a ZacSpin model from Intamin, would be the first of its kind in the United States. According to the press release, it was scheduled to be built in a "newly themed section" of the park, later revealed as DC Universe in place of Gotham City Backlot. Reports surfaced in February 2011 that portions of track had arrived on site. The ride vehicles also arrived at the park during this time.

After delaying the ride's opening multiple times, Six Flags eventually settled on an opening date of July 1, 2011. Park officials clarified that the delays were due to unplanned design changes to the loading station and not because of mechanical issues. Primary construction was completed in May 2011. In addition to Green Lantern's premiere on July 1, other rides in the DC Universe themed area made their debut as well, including The Flash: Speed Force, and Wonder Woman: Lasso of Truth.

The coaster had a mechanical flaw where the trains would reportedly get stuck upside down. As a solution, Green Lantern received modifications to the trains to reduce the spinning. This, however, resulted in unnatural, painful and shaky movements which caused the ride to receive negative reviews from those who experienced the coaster.

After a fatal incident on Inferno at Terra Mítica in Benidorm, Spain on July 7, 2014, and because the two rides share several similarities, Six Flags Magic Mountain had ceased running Green Lantern: First Flight pending investigation findings from the European park. A week and a half later, Six Flags Magic Mountain reopened the coaster.

=== La Ronde: cancelled opening ===
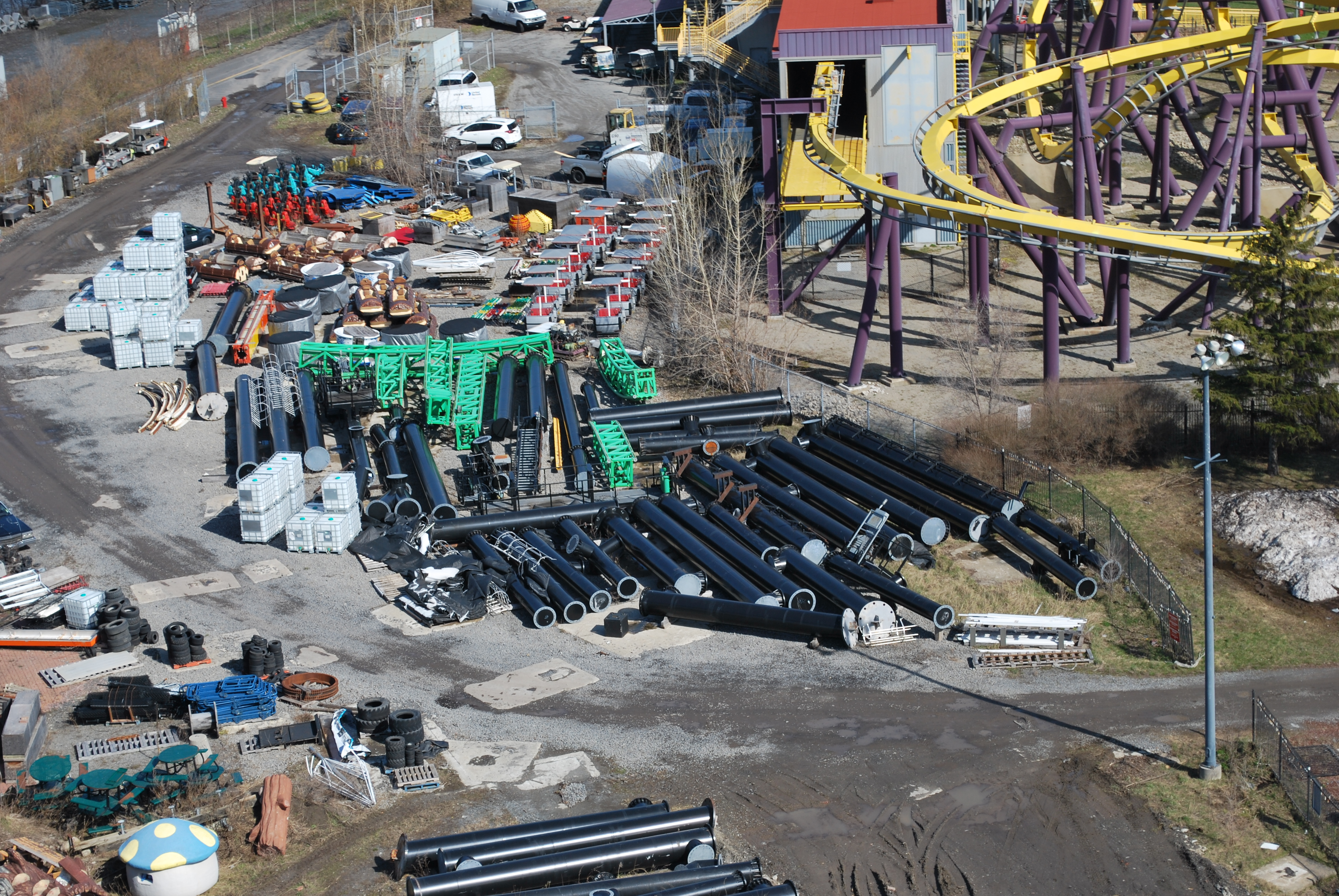
Track and support pieces of Vipère (Green Lantern) in storage at La Ronde

In July 2017, Green Lantern closed unexpectedly for unknown reasons. It remained inactive at the park, and in March 2019, Six Flags announced that Green Lantern would not be reopening. The coaster was removed later in the year and relocated to La Ronde in Montreal, where it was originally set to reopen as Vipère in 2020. Green Lantern's loading station left behind was reused in 2022 for its replacement roller coaster, Wonder Woman Flight of Courage.

Due to the growing impact of the COVID-19 pandemic, Six Flags suspended operations across the company on March 13, 2020. This included La Ronde's construction of Vipère. While the park resumed normal operations in August 2020, Vipère's construction remained on hold. Six Flags had begun taking steps to improve its financial standing by deferring capital projects during the pandemic. A park spokesperson stated that Vipère's debut was being pushed to the 2021 season.

In 2021, La Ronde extended the postponement indefinitely. The Vipère project was eventually cancelled in February 2022. The track and support pieces in storage, as well as the concrete foundations built for the roller coaster, were removed during the park's 2022–2023 winter closure.

== Ride ==
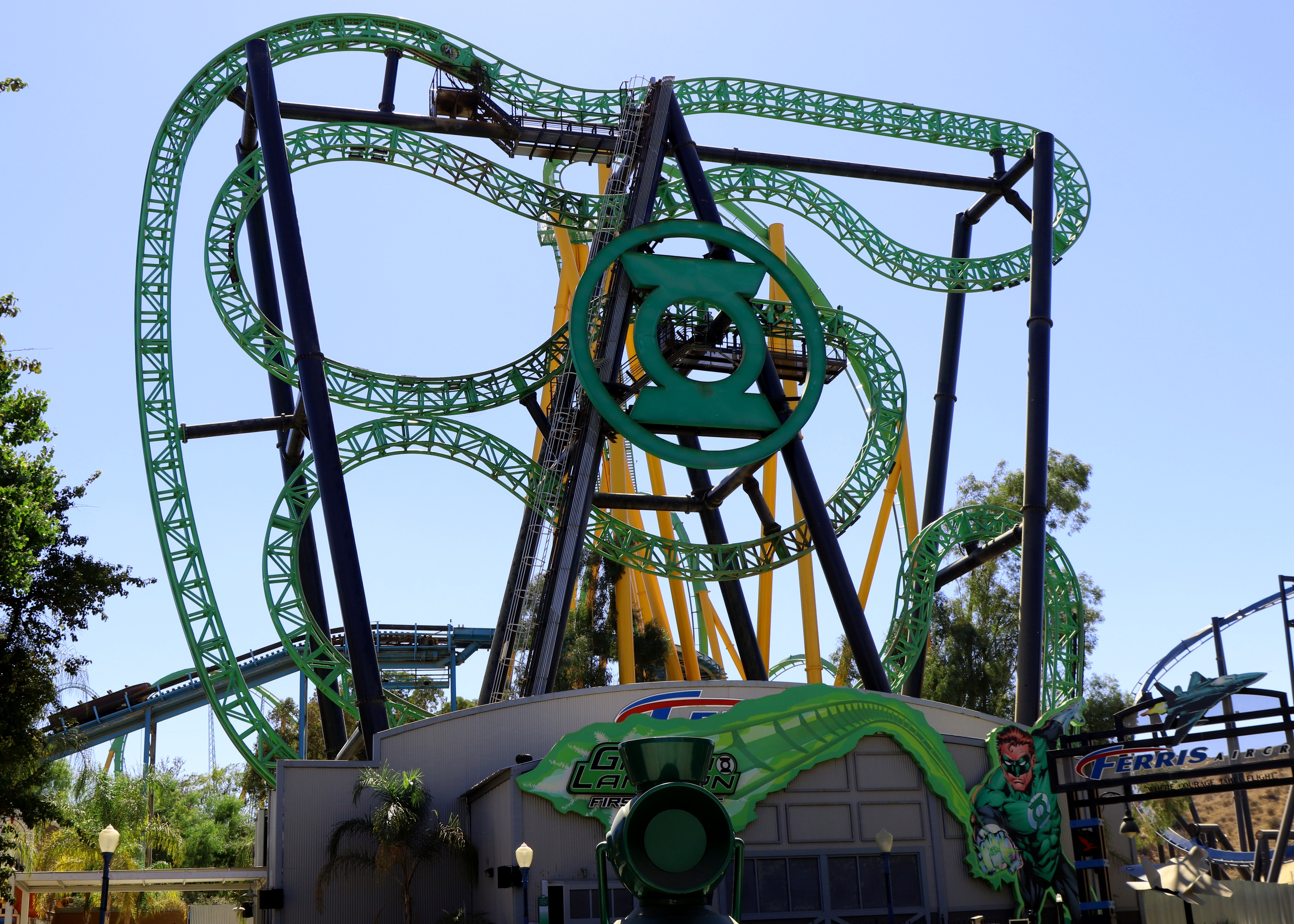
Green Lantern in September 2018, prior to its dismantling

Green Lantern: First Flight was an Intamin ZacSpin roller coaster where riders zigzagged along a 825-foot (251 m) track at speeds of up to 37 miles per hour (60 km/h). Riders flipped head over heels several times throughout the ride in a somewhat uncontrolled manner, but due to the way the ride vehicles were loaded, it sometimes didn't flip at all. The ride has the same layout as Insane at Gröna Lund in Sweden.

Green Lantern was similar to X2, which is also a 4th Dimension roller coaster at Six Flags Magic Mountain that opened in 2002. The difference between the two roller coasters was based on the spinning or rotation of the vehicle. On X2, the seat rotation is controlled by the position of two rails on the outside of the track, resulting in a "choreographed" rotation that is identical on every ride. On Green Lantern, the rotation of the vehicle was controlled by the unequal gravitational pull on different sides of the rotational axis. This uncontrolled spinning resulted in a slightly different ride experience every time.

== Theme ==
When located at Magic Mountain, Green Lantern: First Flight was themed to the DC Comics superhero, Green Lantern. Its opening was preceded by Green Lantern at Six Flags Great Adventure as well as the Green Lantern film. The ride's name also appears as a title for a DC Animated Universe film, Green Lantern: First Flight.

Each of the ride's five cars were themed to resemble shuriken. The entrance of the ride was marked by a 10-foot (3.0 m)-tall lantern icon that glowed green at night. The Green Lantern battery was located at the entrance of the ride.
