= Magic Springs =

Amusement park in Arkansas

Magic Springs Theme and Water Park

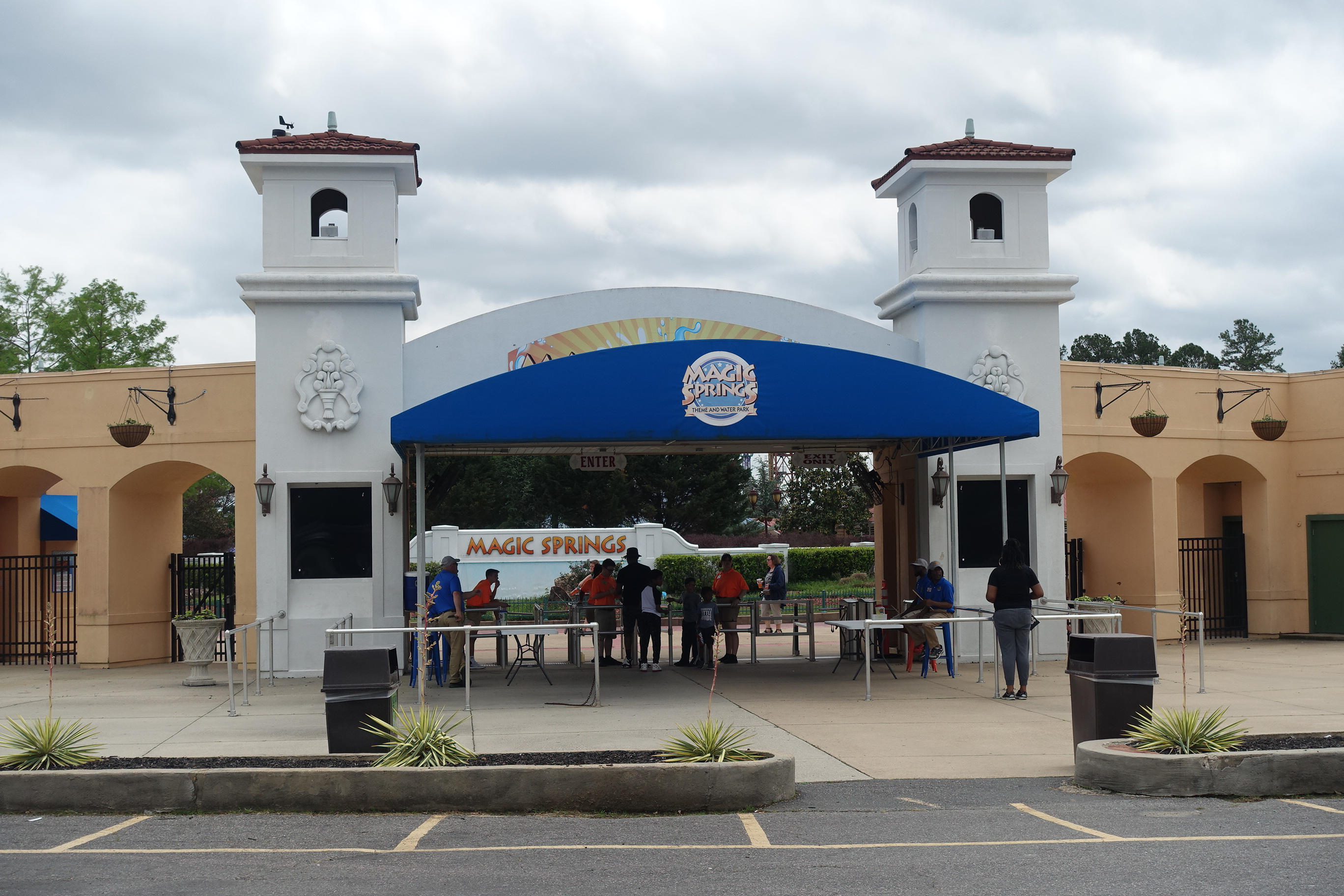
- The entrance to Magic Springs Theme and Water Park.
- Interactive map of Magic Springs Theme and Water Park
- Location: Hot Springs, Arkansas, United States
- Coordinates: 34°31′10″N 93°0′57″W
- Status: Operating
- Opened: July 22, 1978; 48 years ago
- Owner: EPR Properties
- Operated by: Premier Parks, LLC
- Operating season: April through October

Attractions
- Total: 38
- Roller coasters: 4
- Water rides: Dry Park: 2 Water Park: 9 Total:11
- Website: www.magicsprings.com

Magic Springs Theme and Water Park, known as Magic Springs, is an amusement park and water park located in Hot Springs, Arkansas, about 50 miles (80 km) from Little Rock. The park opened in 1978, closed in 1995, and reopened in 2000. It features 38 attractions, including four roller coasters. Magic Springs is owned by EPR Properties and operated by Premier Parks, LLC.

== History ==
Magic Springs Family Fun Park opened July 22, 1978, under the management of Leisure and Recreation Concepts, headed by Dallas businessman Michael Jenkins. Over time, investors became burdened by millions of dollars of debt and sold the park in the 1980s to a group headed by businessman Melvyn Bell, who then had his own financial troubles. It closed in 1995. Fitraco, a Belgian company, bought the amusement park at a foreclosure auction in 1995. Ed Hart of Themeparks LLC was approached by Fitraco, and decided to take on the project.

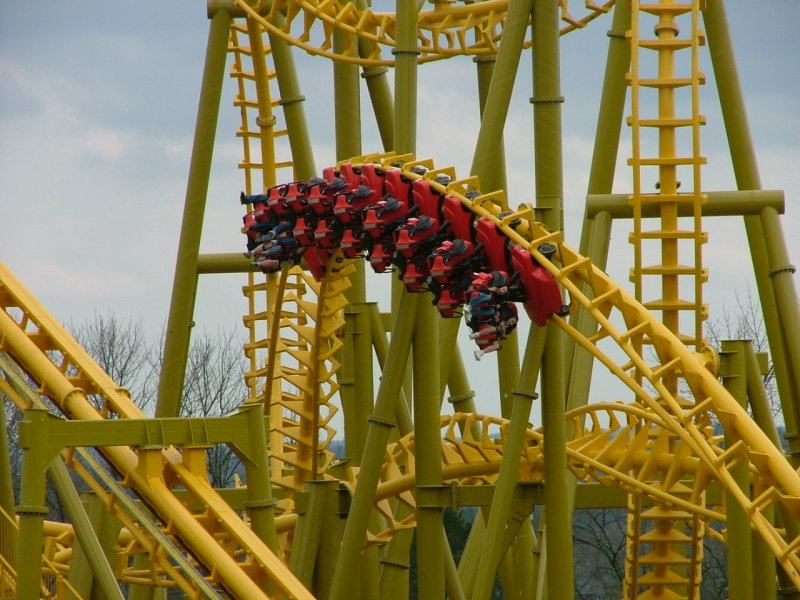
The Gauntlet, a suspended looping coaster, opened at the park in 2004

Magic Springs and Crystal Falls reopened on May 27, 2000, after Hot Springs voters approved a bond issue providing financing for the park. Attendance totaled more than 362,500 in 2000 and beat expectations. In 2001, attendance fell about 25 percent to roughly 272,000, and then to about 254,000 in 2002. The park continued to expand its ride offerings instead of hunkering down. Attendance grew again to more than 291,000 in 2003, the year the Timberwood Amphitheater debuted. It topped 400,000 in 2004 when The Gauntlet was added and the concert series was expanded. In March, owners of Magic Springs agreed to sell the attraction to CNL Income Properties. They leased back the park to the former owners, who continued to manage it. On June 10, 2008, it was announced that PARC Management had taken over the park's management. The leasing agreement between owner CNL and PARC Management was terminated in November 2010 and a new operating agreement with Amusement Management Partners, LLC was announced in January 2011. In late 2016, CNL sold a bundle of its theme park properties, including Magic Springs, to EPR Properties, a REIT based in Kansas City. It was announced at that time that management responsibilities for Magic Springs would be assumed by Premier Parks, LLC. At that time the name was changed to Magic Springs Theme and Water Park.

== Rides and attractions ==
Intensity rating (out of 5)
1 (low) 2 (mild) 3 (moderate) 4 (high) 5 (aggressive)

=== Roller Coasters ===
Name	Manufacturer	Opened	Description	Height restriction	Rating
The Gauntlet	Vekoma	2004	A Vekoma Suspended Looping Coaster. Built in 2004 by Vekoma for Six Flags New Orleans (Jazzland). The sale never finalized and Magic Springs Theme and Water Park bought the coaster. Features a 110 ft. drop and is the first Vekoma SLC to feature a redesigned wheel assembly to give a more comfortable ride.	52 inches	5
X-Coaster	Maurer AG	2006	A SkyLoop XT-150 and the only one in North America. Features a beyond vertical lift and a 150 ft inversion.	52 inches	5
Diamond Mine Run	Miler Coaster, Inc.	2000	A small but fun and exciting coaster.	Between 36 inches and 42 inches with adult	2
Big Bad John	Arrow Dynamics	2002	A mine train roller coaster. Tallest drop of 41 ft. Originated in Mid America Adventure as one half of the River King Mine Train duo. Removed from park in 1988 and sold to Dollywood. Relocated from Dollywood in 1998 where it operated as "Thunder Express".	42 inches	3

=== Thrill rides ===
Name	Opened	Manufacturer	Height restriction	Description	Rating
The Hawk	2000	Zamperla	48 inches	A boom that rotates both clockwise and counter-clockwise at speeds of up to 13rpm that spins you over 70 ft. in the air. A Zamperla spinning ride.	5
Sky Shark	2014	Ride Entertainment Group	42 inches	A 150 ft tall Sky Coaster added to the park in 2014. Sky Shark is an up-charge attraction. Cost per ride is $20.00 for single rider, $30.00 for double riders and $40.00 for triple riders.	5
Brain Drain	2018	Larson International/ARM Rides	48 inches	A 13-story Super Shot drop tower by Larson International/A.R.M. Inc. Added in 2018.	4
Plummet Summit	2005	Hopkins	42 inches to ride alone 36 inches with adult	A splash down ride with a 50 ft. drop.	3

=== Family rides ===
Name	Opened	Manufacturer	Height restriction	Description	Rating
Rum Runner Pirate Ship	2000	Zamperla	42 inches and 48 inches with adult	A Zamperla pendulum ride in the style of a pirate ship that swings riders back and forth higher with each swing.	4
Old No. 2 Logging Company	1978	Arrow Dynamics	42 inches and 48 inches with adult	A log flume ride that takes riders through the rapids before taking a huge drop into a splash pool.	3
Carousel	1990	Chance Rides	under 42 inches with adult	A classic carousel ride.	1
Ozark Mountain Taxi Company	1990	Morgan	48 inches and 36 inches with adult	A track car ride.	2
Razorback Roundup Bumper Cars	1979	Soli of Italy	52 inches and 48 inches with adult	A classic bumper cars ride.	4

=== Kids' rides ===
Name	Opened	Manufacturer	Height restriction	Description	Rating
Fearless Flyers	1978	Allan Herschell Company	Under 42" with adult 1 adult per car	A ride where small airplanes where riders control up and down movement while the ride spins.	1
Looney Ballooney	1998	Zamperla	Under 42" with adult 1 adult per car	Hot air balloons that rise up while the ride spins.	2
Bugga Booga Wheel	1997	Zamperla	under 42" with adult	A bug themed miniature ferris wheel.	1
Kit 'n Kaboodle Express	1991	Chance Rides	less than 42" with adult	A miniature train ride that is exciting for the kids.	2
Krazy Kars	2000	SBF Visa Group	32" to ride less than 42" with adult	A junior teacups ride	2
Lil' Leapin' Lizards	1995	Zamperla	minimum 36" maximum 52"	A gentle yet fun freefall tower.	2
Clown Around	2004	Zamperla	minimum 36" maximum 48"	A jump around.	1

=== Former rides ===
- Twist N' Shout Zamperla Wild Mouse – Added in 2000. Removed in 2012. Relocated to Family Kingdom in Myrtle Beach, South Carolina.
- Dr. Dean's Rocket Machine - Added in 2002. Removed for the 2016 season.
- Wild Thang - Removed before the 2016 season, relocated to Frontier City and opened as 'Gunslinger.'
- Roaring Tornado - Added in 1980 and sold in 1990. It was relocated to Denver, Colorado. It is now owned by Elitch Gardens and operates under the name "Sidewinder."
- Sky Hook - Originally built in 1910 as a Von Roll Holding Cargo Crane in Switzerland, later converted into an amusement observation tower attraction. Used at 1937 Paris World's Fair, Presented at Swiss Expo in 1939. Operated at 1958 Expo World's Fair in Brussels. Relocated in 1963, during the grand opening of Six Flags Over Texas, closed in 1968, relocated to Six Flags Over Georgia, closed in 1977. Relocated and opened in 1978, converted into a bungee-jumping platform. Closed in 1995 during Magic Springs' closure and renovations. Removed in 1996, dismantled and sold for scrap.
- Arkansas Twister (1992-2024) wooden coaster "Magic Springs Thrill Rides". 6 February 2024.

== Timberwood Amphitheater ==
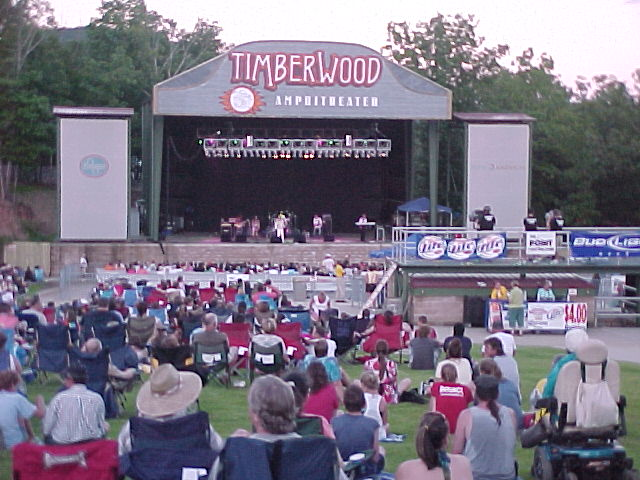
Timberwood Amphitheater at Magic Springs

The Timberwood Amphitheater is a state-of-the-art 5,000-seat concert venue which offers a variety of entertainment. Concerts are held every Saturday during the operating season. While there is free lawn seating, there are also 26 rows of bench reserved seats in front of the stage. Currently VIP Reserved seats (the first six rows) are $10.00 while the price for the rest of the reserved seats is $5.00.

== Annual events ==
- Education In Motion - School group days where fun at the park is linked to lessons in the classroom.
- Magic Screams - Halloween festival in October where Magic Springs is transformed into a scary and frightening Magic Screams.

== Water park ==
Crystal Falls is the water park portion of Magic Springs Theme and Water Park and is included with park admission. Crystal Falls is open daily from May through mid-August and weekends to the end of September. Crystal Falls has many water attractions which include:

- Bear Cub Bend - kids' play zone
- Crystal Cove Wave Pool
- Crystal Lagoon - four tube slides, three body slides and an activity pool (Opened in 2007)
- Grizzly Creek Splash Zone - kid activity zone with a suspended bridge and three smaller water slides
- High Sierra Slide Tower - four tube slides, each different in darkness
- Kodiak Canyon Adventure River
- Rapid Falls Raceway - seven side-by-side racing slides (Opened in 2008)
- Boogie Blast - FlowRider wave simulator (Opened in 2010)
- Splash Island - Whitewater Giant Water Play Area (Opened in 2012)

== Awards ==
- "Best of the Best" – Arkansas Democrat Gazette, Readers Poll
- Golden Guard Award – Excellence in lifeguarding, Ellis & Associates
- Southern Travel Treasure – AAA
- Gold Elite Award – Performance of water safety staff, Ellis & Associates
- Platinum Elite Award – Performance of water safety staff, Ellis & Associates
- The Natural State Award – Arkansas' top tourist attraction, Arkansas Governor's Conference on Tourism
- Best Area Attraction – Hot Springs Sentinel-Record, Readers Poll
- Silver Elite Award – Excellence in lifeguarding, Ellis & Associates
- Large Business Recognition – Excellence in landscaping, Hot Springs/Garland County Beautification Commission
- Large Business of the Year – Excellence in community service, Hot Springs Chamber of Commerce
- Outstanding Achievement for Access to Persons with Disabilities – S.A.I.L.S.
- Silver Cup – Outstanding effort in tourism, Garland County Hospitality Association
- Top Three Family Friendly Parks in the Nation – Better Homes and Gardens

== Incidents ==
- On June 9, 2007, a power outage left 12 riders on the X-Coaster stranded upside down, 150 feet in the air, for 30 minutes.
- On September 4, 2006, an 11-year-old boy was shot in the wrist by a falling .22 caliber bullet.
- On July 30, 2006, a 45-year-old woman from Memphis, Tennessee fell from the Twist and Shout coaster. Inspectors said that she was too large for the ride, causing the restraints to not work properly.
- On July 24, 2017, the X-Coaster malfunctioned, leaving riders stranded 50-feet in the air for one hour. Eventually, the train was manually returned to the station.

== See also ==
- Kentucky Kingdom, Amusement park in Louisville, Kentucky formerly operated by Themeparks LLC
- Themeparks LLC, Amusement park company founded by Ed Hart
