= Project Zero (roller coaster) =

Steel roller coaster in Victoria, Australia

- Previously known as BuzzSaw (2011–2021)
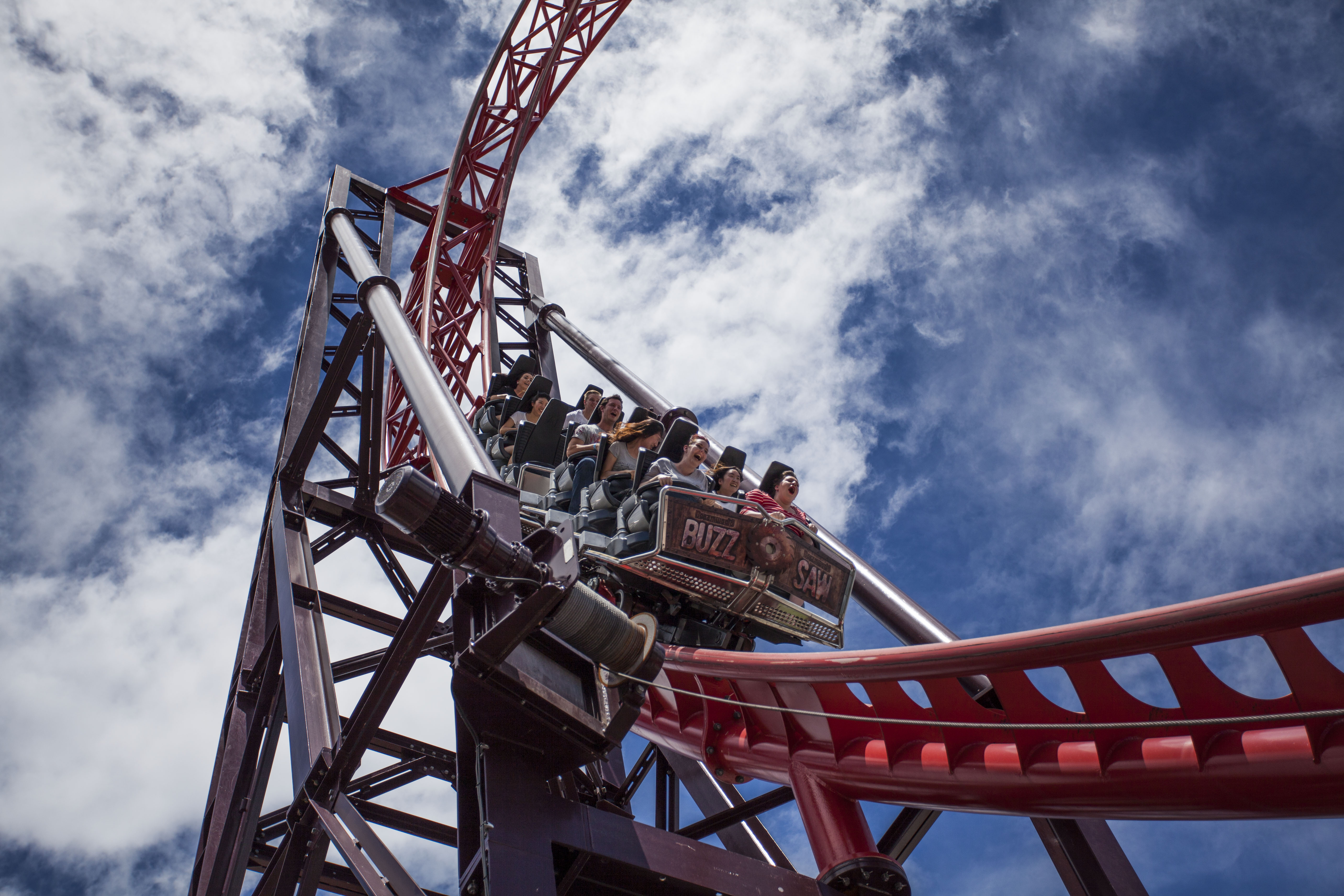
- The ride in its former location at Dreamworld (2011)

Gumbuya World
- Location: Gumbuya World
- Park section: Oz Adventure
- Coordinates: 38.068745°S 145.660330°E
- Status: Operating
- Opening date: 23 December 2022

General statistics
- Type: Steel
- Manufacturer: Maurer AG
- Model: SkyLoop XT 150
- Lift/launch system: Vertical chain lift hill
- Height: 46.2 m (152 ft)
- Length: 150 m (490 ft)
- Speed: 105 km/h (65 mph)
- Inversions: 2
- Duration: 0:50
- Max vertical angle: 360°
- Capacity: 600 riders per hour
- G-force: 5
- Height restriction: 130 cm (4 ft 3 in)
- Trains: Single train with 2 cars; riders arranged 2 across in 3 rows for a total of 12 riders per train
- Former location: Dreamworld (2011–2021)
- Project Zero at RCDB

Project Zero is a Maurer AG SkyLoop roller coaster located at Gumbuya World in Tynong, Victoria, Australia. The ride originally operated as BuzzSaw at the Dreamworld theme park on the Gold Coast from 2011 to 2021.

The ride features a vertical lift hill and a "360-degree heartline roll" inversion, reaching speeds of 105 kilometres per hour (65 mph). It originally opened at Dreamworld on 17 September 2011 as part of the park's 30th birthday celebrations. Following its closure at Dreamworld in August 2021, the ride was sold to Gumbuya World, where it was refurbished, repainted, and reopened on 23 December 2022 as Project Zero.

== History ==
=== Dreamworld era (2011–2021) ===
In December 2009, a Gold Coast Bulletin report stated that Dreamworld was in negotiations with a manufacturer to add to its "Big 6" thrill rides. In February 2011, Dreamworld's operator, Ardent Leisure, announced the addition of two new rides in 2011 as part of Dreamworld's 30th Birthday. The name "BuzzSaw" was confirmed in July 2011.

On 20 July 2011, Dreamworld officially announced the addition of BuzzSaw. Testing began in early September 2011, and the ride opened to the public on 17 September 2011.

BuzzSaw was situated in the Gold Rush Country section of the park. Marketing campaigns included a television commercial teasing a "bone-chilling thrill ride" and banners describing it as a "ripper of a ride".

On 17 July 2021, Dreamworld confirmed via email to pass holders that BuzzSaw would be retired after 31 August 2021, just shy of its 10th anniversary. The decision was attributed to the ride's close proximity to the new Steel Taipan coaster and a shift in focus toward future developments. Demolition commenced in November 2021.

=== Gumbuya World era (2022–present) ===
Following its dismantling at Dreamworld, the ride was purchased by Gumbuya World in Victoria. The coaster was transported to the park where it underwent a significant refurbishment, including a colour change from red and maroon to green and black.

The ride was re-themed as Project Zero, part of the park's "Oz Adventure" expansion. It officially opened to the public on 23 December 2022.

== Characteristics ==
Project Zero is a SkyLoop XT 150 model manufactured by Maurer AG. The track length is 150 metres (490 ft) and the ride reaches a maximum height of 46.2 metres (152 ft).

The ride consists of a single train which holds 12 riders. The train features two cars, each seating riders in three rows of two. Riders are restrained by a lap bar. It is capable of reaching speeds of 105 kilometres per hour (65 mph) and exerting 5 Gs on riders.

== Experience ==
=== Ride layout ===
The SkyLoop experience begins with a vertical chain lift hill to a height of 46.2 metres (152 ft). At the top of the lift, the car is pulled slowly backwards over itself before being released into a full heartline roll. It then drops down a steep hill back towards the station, passing through the station to ascend the lift hill again. The train oscillates between the two hills before losing momentum and being caught by the chain lift to be lowered back into the station. The ride duration is approximately 50 seconds.

=== Theming ===
==== As Project Zero (Current) ====
At Gumbuya World, the ride is themed to a secretive space mission operated by the fictional "Australian Space Technology Research Organization" (A.S.T.R.O). The queue and station area are designed to resemble a rocket launch facility deep in the outback, with riders assuming the role of volunteer test pilots for the "Project Zero" mission.

==== As BuzzSaw (Former) ====
Former ride logo at Dreamworld

At Dreamworld, the ride was themed around a series of unexplainable occurrences in the fictional Town of Gold Rush. The backstory involved the ghost of Jack Darke, a sawmill worker who was killed by a buzz saw in 1887. The station was themed as an abandoned sawmill, featuring audio effects of buzz saws and visual warnings to escape.

== Reception ==
Upon its original opening as BuzzSaw, reception was generally positive, with the ride being described as a "scream machine" and a fitting addition to Dreamworld. In its first year, it attracted over 435,000 riders.

Following its relocation to Gumbuya World, reviews for Project Zero have been positive, with riders praising the ride's intensity and the 5G forces.

== Incidents ==
During its time at Dreamworld, the ride experienced mechanical issues on occasion. In March 2018, six people were stranded on the ride for 15 minutes due to a sensor malfunction. A similar incident occurred in 2017, where passengers were suspended for approximately 30 minutes.

== See also ==
- 2011 in amusement parks
- 2021 in amusement parks
- 2022 in amusement parks
