= Gumbuya World =

Amusement park in Victoria, Australia

- Previously known as Gumbuya Park
- Interactive map of Gumbuya World
- Location: Tynong North, Victoria, Australia
- Coordinates: 38.069185°S 145.658643°E
- Opened: 1978; 48 years ago
- Owner: Gerry Ryan; Wal Pisciotta; Ray Weinzierl; Adam Campbell; Brett Murray
- Slogan: "Have A Great Day Out"
- Operating season: All year round

Attractions
- Total: 23
- Roller coasters: 3
- Water rides: 12 (eight slides, lazy river, water playground, wave pool)
- Website: gumbuya.com.au

Gumbuya World (formerly Gumbuya Park) is an amusement park in Tynong North in Victoria, Australia. The park was opened in 1978 and its investors include Gerry Ryan (founder and owner of Jayco Australia) and Wal Pisciotta (owner of Carsales).

The park contains various rides and attractions ranging from water slides to roller coasters and wildlife exhibits. Its two major waterslides are the Boomerango and the Taipan. The park also features a lazy river ride, giant water playground, wave simulator, fun-for-all roller coaster, suspended family coaster, thrilling skyloop coaster, tree swing, train ride, dodgem cars, and a berry twirl ride for young children. There is also an exhibit featuring dingoes, lizards, crocodiles, koalas, aviaries and wallabies which incorporates a petting zoo.

== History ==
Originally a pheasant farm, the facility was converted into a wildlife park in 1978 by the late Ron Rado.

In October 2011, vandals attached a powerful explosive charge to the large pheasant statue at the entrance to the park and blew out its rear end. That followed earlier vandalism, including the theft of mini cars and motor karts.

In September 2016, Gumbuya Park was sold for $4.65 million to a group of investors which included Gerry Ryan and Carsales founder Wal Pisciotta, Adam Campbell, Brett Murray, and Ray Weinzierl to buy the park and upgrade it into a more ambitious Theme Park.

== Rides and attractions ==
Thrill level
None (stationary attraction- show, play area, exhibit)
Mild (low speeds with expected movements)
Moderate (moderate speed with unexpected movements & physical forces)
High (high speeds with extremely unusual and stressful physical forces)

Name	Type	Thrill Level	Manufacturer	Opened
Oasis Springs
Boomerango	Boomerango WaterSlide	High	White Water West	2017
Taipan	Rattler/Constrictor fusion	High	White Water West	2017
Red Belly Racer	Multi-lane racer	High	ProSlide	2019
Tiger Snake Tango	Turbo-Twister	High	ProSlide	2019
The Break	Wave Pool	Mild	ProSlide	2019
Surf's Up	Flow rider	High	Wave Loch	2017
Typhoon Island	Kids play area & body slides	Mild	White Water West	2017
Lazy River	Wave River	Mild	White Water West	2017
Cabanas	Cabanas	None	Gumbuya World	2019

Name	Type	Thrill Level	Manufacturer	Opened
Oz Adventure
Project Zero	Skyloop	High	Maurer	2022
TNT	Suspended family coaster	Moderate	Vekoma	2022
Mining Race Coaster	Fun-for all coaster	Moderate	SBF Visa	2017
Rebel	KMG Inversion	High	KMG Rides	2018
Tree Swing	Wave Swinger	Moderate	Unknown	2017
Rush Hour	Spinning ride	Moderate	Unknown	2017

Outback Explorers

- Berry Twirl
- Outback Pirates ship
- Desert Derby dodgem cars
- Truck Convoy (leads to Gerry's Roadhouse)
- Ray's Express (takes visitors through Gumbuya World)
- Outback Pursuit

Wildlife Trail

- Koala and Dingo exhibit
- Walkthrough Aviary and Wallaby trail
- Critter Cave (featuring insects, lizards and baby crocodiles)
- Petting Zoo

The area contains 52 species of different animals in a bushland setting.
