= Wooden Warrior =

Wooden roller coaster at Quassy Amusement Park

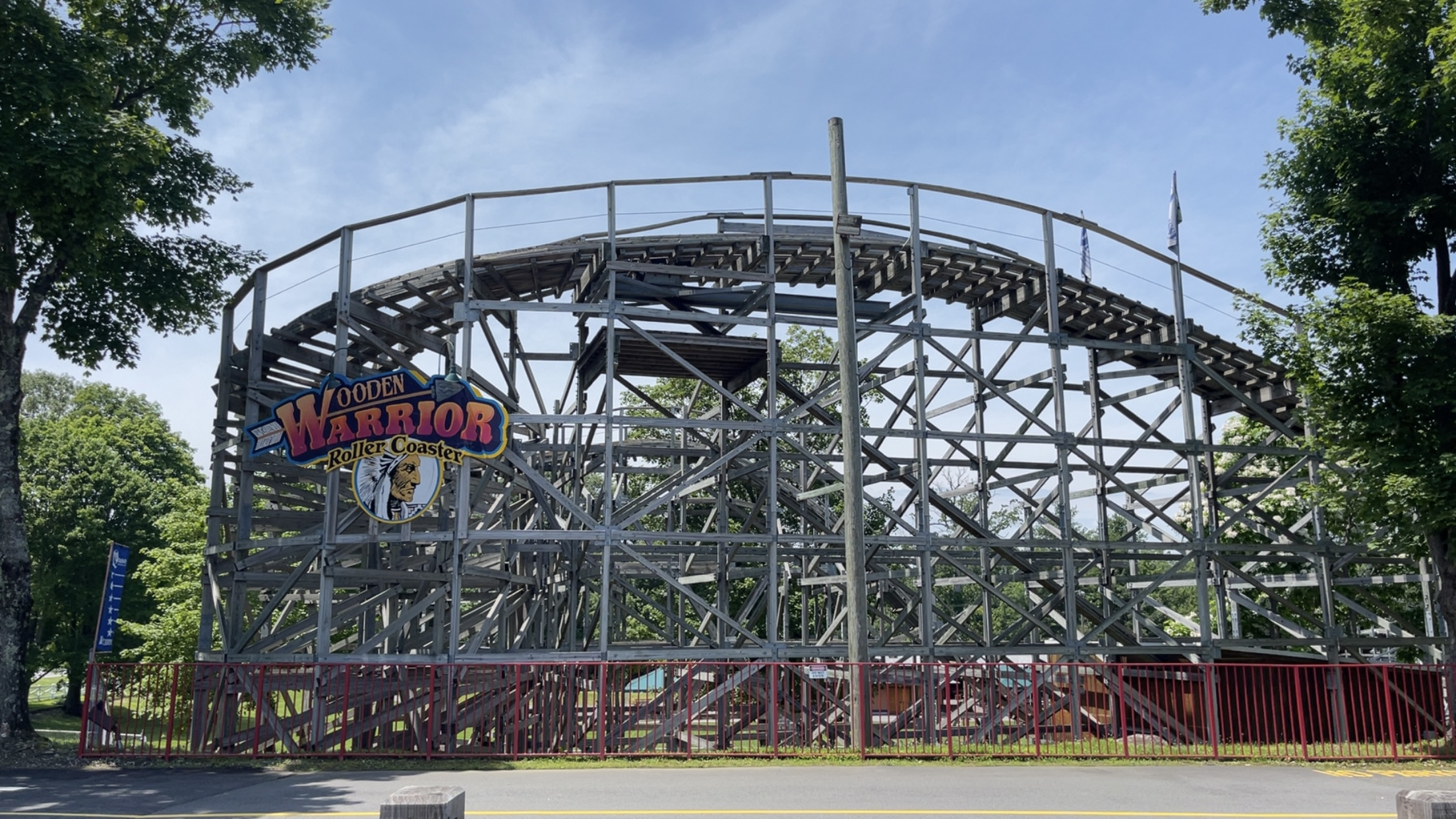

Quassy Amusement Park
- Location: Quassy Amusement Park
- Coordinates: 41°31′35″N 73°9′3″W
- Status: Operating
- Opening date: April 23, 2011

General statistics
- Type: Wood
- Manufacturer: The Gravity Group
- Lift/launch system: Chain Lift Hill
- Height: 35 ft (11 m)
- Drop: 45 ft (14 m)
- Length: 1,200 ft (370 m)
- Speed: 35 mph (56 km/h)
- Inversions: 0
- Max vertical angle: 48.5°
- Restraint style: Lap bar
- Height restriction: 40 in (102 cm)
- Trains: Single train with 6 cars; riders arranged 2 across in a single row for a total of 12 riders per train
- Wooden Warrior at RCDB

Wooden Warrior is a wooden roller coaster located at Quassy Amusement Park in Middlebury, Connecticut, United States. The coaster was designed and built by American wooden coaster designer The Gravity Group. Wooden Warrior features a 45-foot (14 m) drop, with a maximum speed of 35 miles per hour (56 km/h) and a total track length of 1,239 feet (378 m). The coaster features Gravitykraft's Timberliner trains, and was the first wooden coaster in the United States to use such trains. Despite the coaster's small size, it has been well received by enthusiasts for its air time and thrilling experience.

== History ==
=== Announcement ===
On January 8, 2009, Quassy Amusement Park announced the proposal of a wooden roller coaster built by The Gravity Group, after considering proposals from various manfucaturers. It was announced that the proposal would be submitted at the February meeting of the Town of Middlebury Planning & Zoning Commission. The ride was announced to be replacing Mad Mouse, the park's wild mouse roller coaster built by the Allan Herschell Company. The proposal was met with concern by residents at the meeting, with concerns centering around noise pollution due to the new ride and depreciation of property value. A nearby homeowner filed an appeal for the park to add more buffering to the park's proposals, but the appeal was eventually dismissed. In May 2009, the park announced that the ride would be constructed alongside a 35-foot drop tower built by the SBF Visa Group and "Bullet Bowl", a water slide built by ProSlide Technology. The park also announced that the first rides on the roller coaster would be auctioned off for charity and that the name of the ride would be decided by students of local schools.

=== Construction and opening ===
Construction on the ride began in August 2010, and continued through the Winter. In September 2010, it was announced that the ride would be named Wooden Warrior. The name was nominated by elementary school students from Middlebury and Bethel, Connecticut, and selected by the park in order to reflect the Native American history of Lake Quassapaug. Wooden Warrior opened on April 23, 2011, the park's opening day for the 2011 season. The ride opened despite heavy rain, with the first riders being the winners of the charity auction.

== Ride experience and characteristics ==
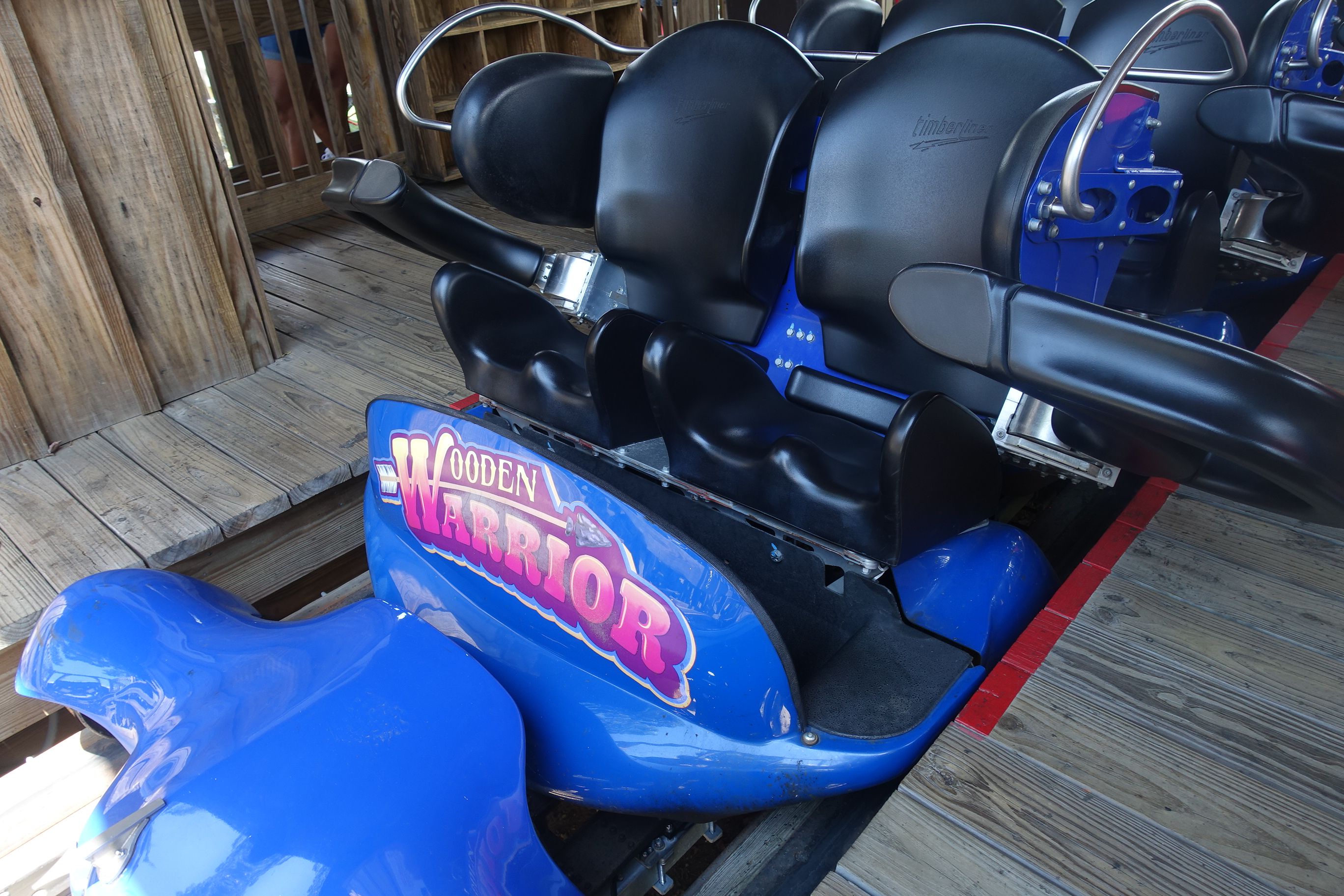
Wooden Warrior's Timberliner train

The ride's station is located on top of the park's former entrance, near the Big Flush water slide. After leaving the station, the ride climbs a 35-foot (11 m) tall lift hill. The ride then turns around and drops 45 feet (14 m) through the 48.5-degree first drop, reaching a top speed of 35 miles per hour (56 km/h). It then goes through a small airtime hill before crossing over the park's narrow gauge Chance Rides railroad. The ride then goes through a turnaround through an artificial tunnel. The ride then crosses back over the railroad through a double up before going through a few final airtime hills and into the final break run. According to the manufacturer, there are nine moments of air time over the course of the ride.

The ride runs one train, with twelve riders arranged in six rows of two across. The train is a Timberliner manufactured by Gravitykraft, and the ride was the first in the United States to use the Timberliner. The Timberliner train features hydraulic restraints, accommodating more guests and allowing it to have a 40-inch (100 cm) height limit. The ride has 1,239 feet (378 m) of wooden track. In total, the ride was constructed with around 140,000 board feet of pressure treated Southern pine, alongside more than 200,000 nails, and more than 35,000 nuts and bolts.

== Reception ==
The ride received praise from enthusiasts for its air time and thrilling ride experience. According to Jim Winslett of ElloCoaster, the ride features "crazy airtime all over the layout" and "speed that shouldn't even be possible". Robb Alvey of Theme Park Review praised the ride's exciting experience, noting that the ride "packs a punch" and described it as "one wild ride", despite its small size. He also described Wooden Warrior as "the best small coaster in the world", and ranked it as his 15th favorite wooden roller coaster, out of over 200. In the Golden Ticket Awards, Wooden Warrior placed third among the best new roller coasters of 2011.

=== Awards ===
Golden Ticket Awards: Top wood Roller Coasters
Year									1998	1999
Ranking									–	–
Year	2000	2001	2002	2003	2004	2005	2006	2007	2008	2009
Ranking	–	–	–	–	–	–	–	–	–	–
Year	2010	2011	2012	2013	2014	2015	2016	2017	2018	2019
Ranking	–	40	32	36	28	38	46	45	49	–
Year	2020	2021	2022	2023	2024	2025	2026			
Ranking	N/A	–	–	–	50	–	45 (tie)			
