= ZDT =

ZDT may refer to:

- ZDT's Amusement Park, a family amusement park in Seguin, TX
- Zero Dark Thirty, a 2012 film by Kathryn Bigelow
- a graphics file format used by TECH Win, see Comparison of graphics file formats
- ZDT, a 1986 novel by Julian Rathbone
