= The Bobcat (roller coaster) =

Roller coaster at Great Escape in New York

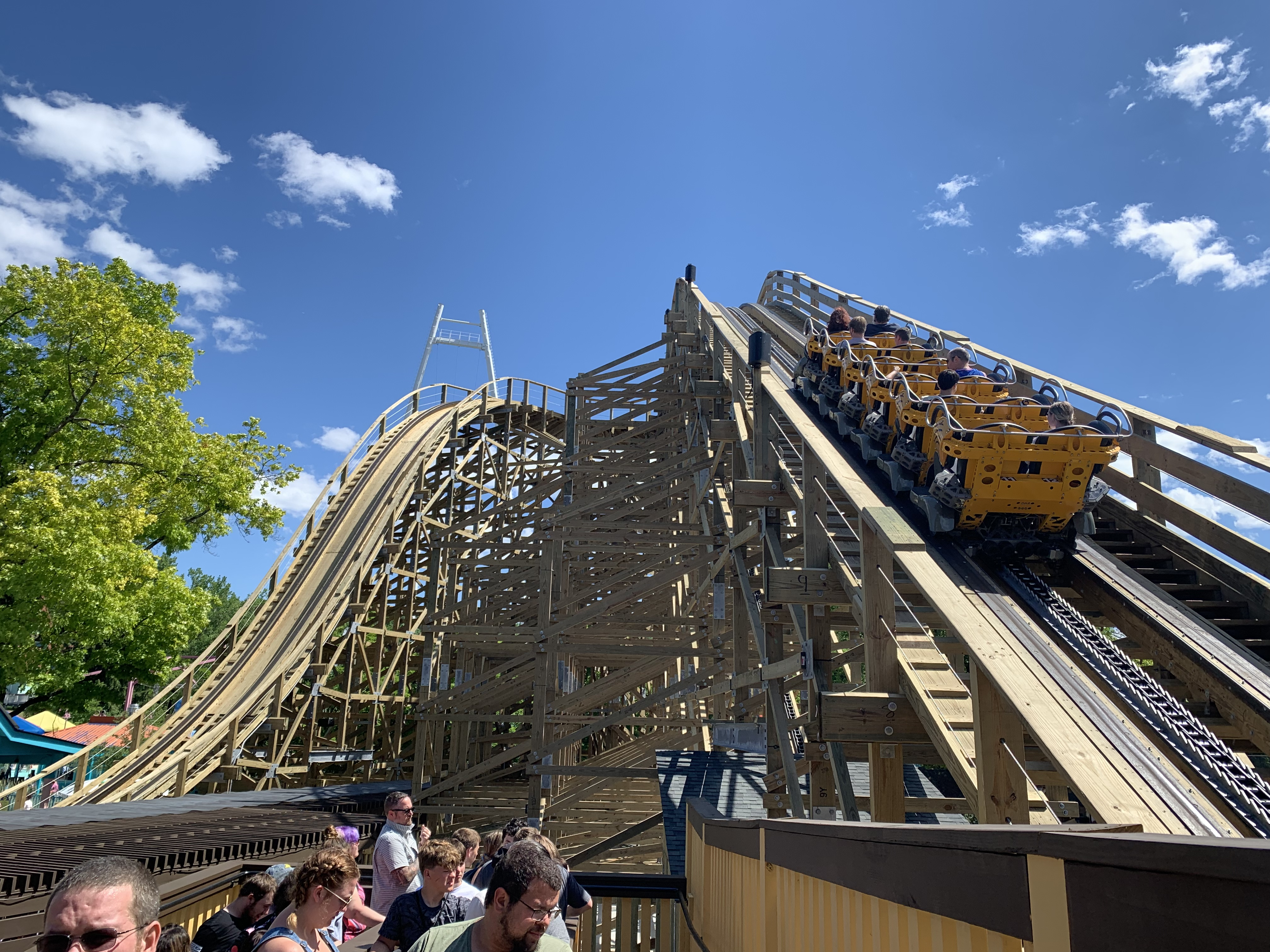

Great Escape
- Location: Great Escape
- Park section: Fest Area
- Coordinates: 43°21′03.8″N 73°41′15.8″W
- Status: Operating
- Opening date: June 1, 2024
- Replaced: Alpine Bobsled

General statistics
- Type: Wood – Family
- Manufacturer: Gravitykraft Corporation
- Designer: The Gravity Group
- Model: Wooden Coaster
- Track layout: Out and back
- Lift/launch system: Chain lift hill
- Height: 55.4 ft (16.9 m)
- Length: 1,412 ft (430 m)
- Speed: 40 mph (64 km/h)
- Height restriction: 42 in (107 cm)
- Trains: 2 trains with 6 cars; riders arranged 2 across in a single row for a total of 12 riders per train
- Fast Lane available
- The Bobcat at RCDB

The Bobcat is a wooden roller coaster at Great Escape in Queensbury, New York, United States. It is located in the Fest Area section, and was manufactured by The Gravity Group.

The park announced plans for the coaster on August 30, 2023. The Bobcat was the park's first roller coaster since 2005 and the first wooden roller coaster built in the state of New York since 1999. Construction on the coaster started in December 2023. The Bobcat opened on June 1, 2024.

== Rankings ==
Golden Ticket Awards: Top wooden Roller Coasters
Year									1998	1999
Ranking									–	–
Year	2000	2001	2002	2003	2004	2005	2006	2007	2008	2009
Ranking	–	–	–	–	–	–	–	–	–	–
Year	2010	2011	2012	2013	2014	2015	2016	2017	2018	2019
Ranking	–	–	–	–	–	–	–	–	–	–
Year	2020	2021	2022	2023	2024	2025	2026			
Ranking	N/A	–	–	–	45	–	37			

== Photo gallery ==
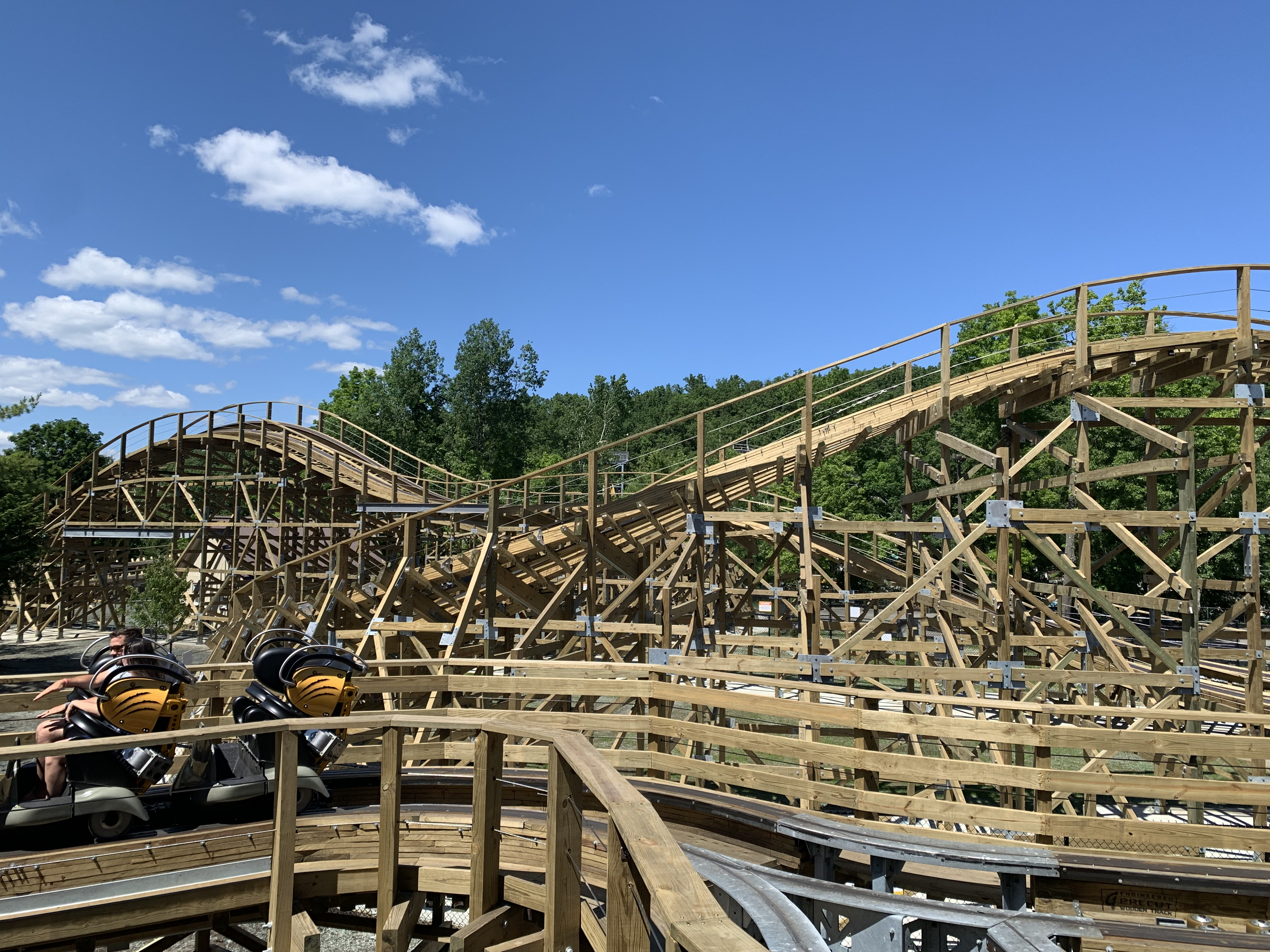
Back section of the coaster

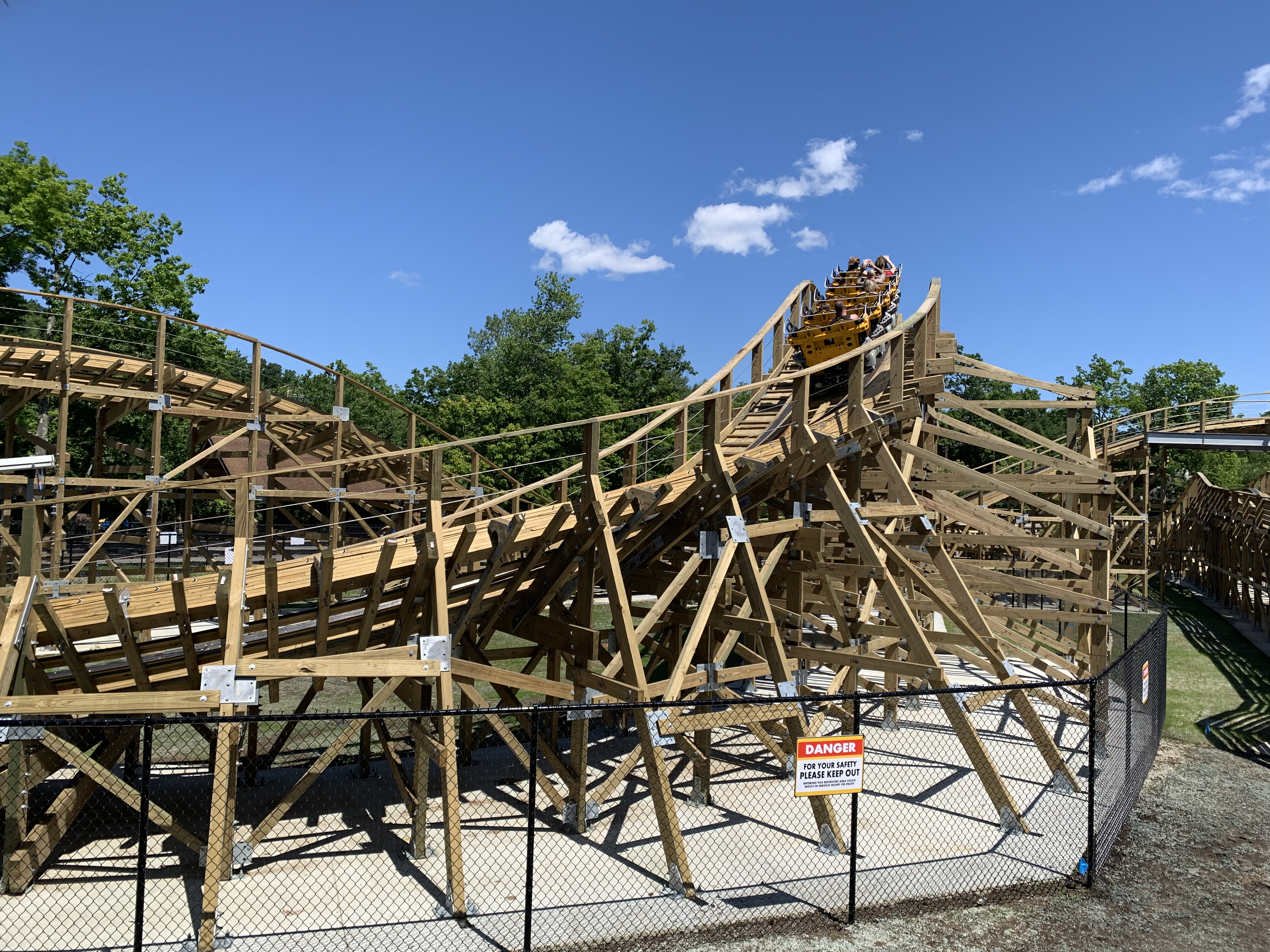
Double-down airtime hill

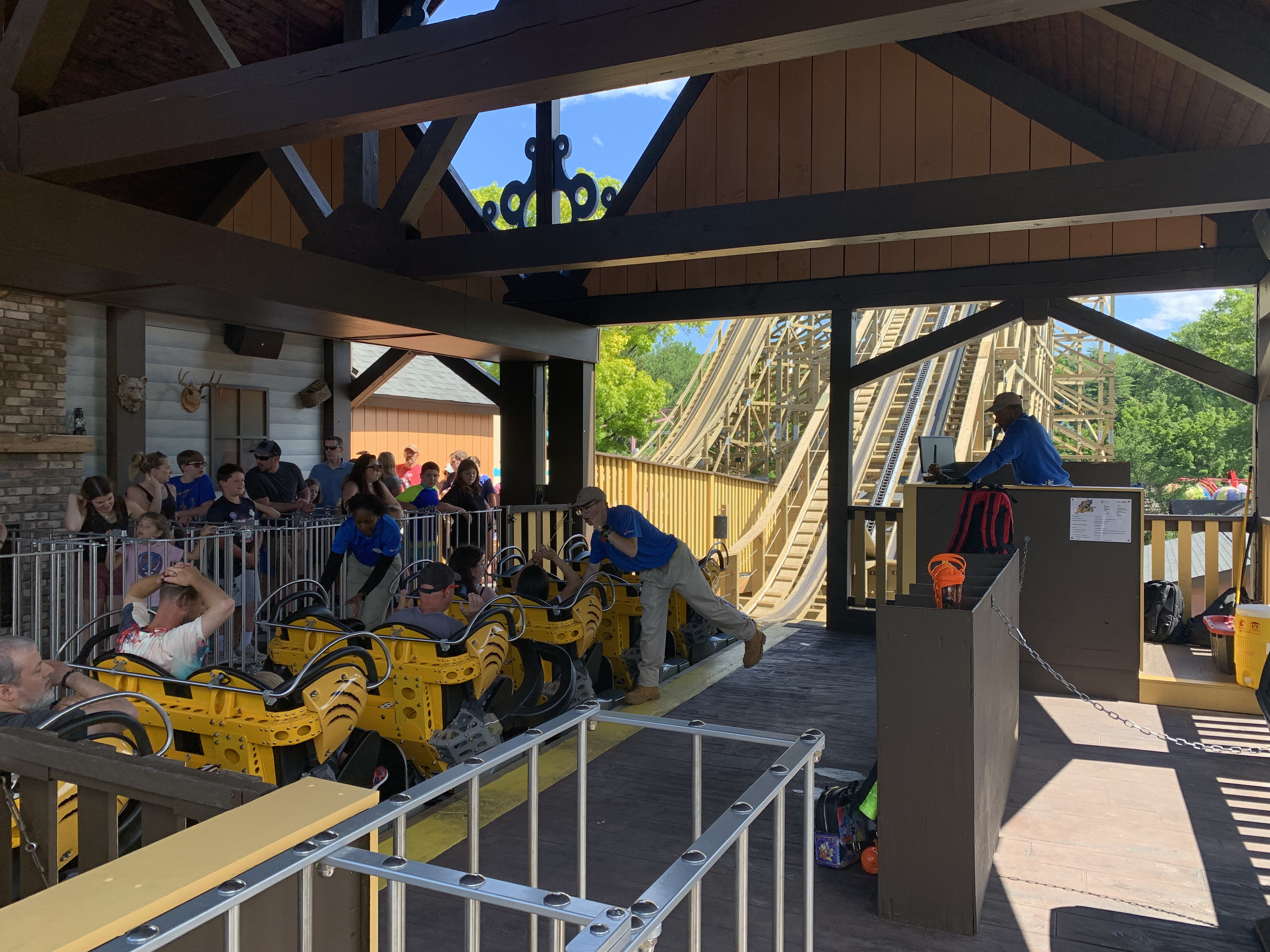
Station
