= Quassy Amusement Park =

Amusement park

Quassy Amusement & Waterpark
- Previously known as Lake Quassapaug (1908-1982)
- Interactive map of Quassy Amusement & Waterpark
- Location: Middlebury, Connecticut, U.S.
- Coordinates: 41.5271°N 73.1504°W
- Opened: 1908
- Owner: George Frantzis II; Eric Anderson
- Slogan: Affordable Family Fun
- Operating season: Late April through early October
- Area: 20 acres (8.1 ha)

Attractions
- Total: 38
- Roller coasters: 2
- Water rides: 15
- Website: www.quassy.com

Quassy Amusement Park is an amusement and waterpark in Middlebury, Connecticut, and is one of only 11 trolley parks still operating in the United States. It has 20 rides on its 20 acres (81,000 m^{2}). Quassy consists of a full-fledged amusement park plus a waterpark called Splash Away Bay. Swimming in Lake Quassapaug is available. In 1901, a writer pronounced Lake Quassapaug as "the handsomest bit of natural water on Earth". Today, beach clubs and houses surround the entire lake. The park is home to the award-winning Wooden Warrior roller coaster, which opened in 2011. Quassy offers swimming, picnicking, a catering service, an arcade, a waterpark, and live entertainment including school bands, dance groups and magic shows.

The park uses an all-day ride and waterpark wristbands or pay-by-ride system. A wristband is required to enter the waterpark and beach area, or guests may pay a separate admission. Admission to the park is free but a parking fee is charged.

== History ==
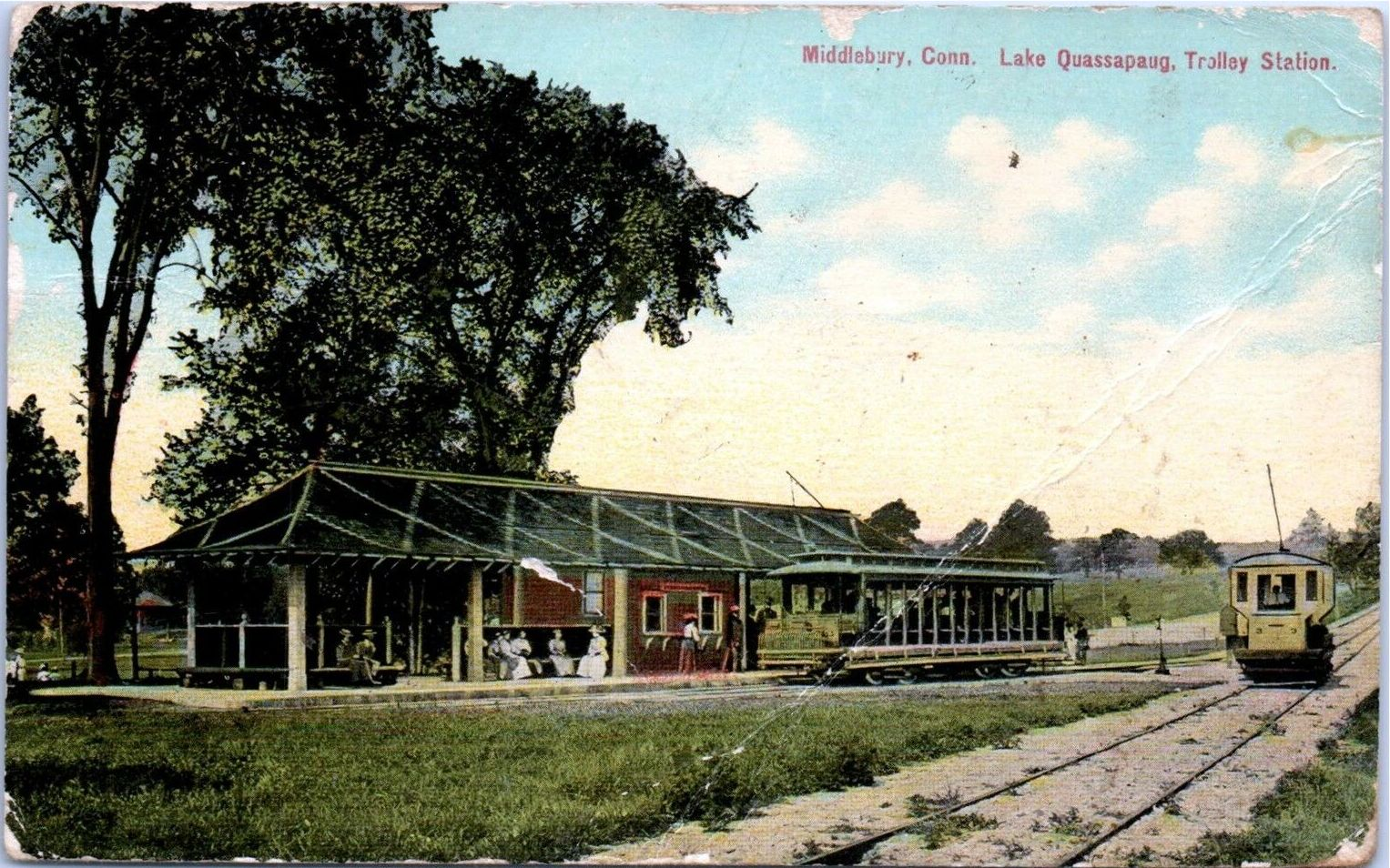
1917 postcard of the trolley station

Quassy originally opened as a trolley park, owned and operated by an electrified rail line. It has been a staple in Connecticut entertainment for more than 100 years. In 1908, Quassy became a stop along the trolley line between Waterbury and Woodbury. As more people got off at this stop, Quassy became a summer resort area. In 1937, three businessmen purchased the property and began to develop it. After World War II, Quassy established itself as a full amusement park.

== Rides and attractions ==
Ride name	Attraction Type	Opening year	Manufacturer
Roller Coasters
Little Dipper	Kiddie Roller Coaster	1952	Allan Herschell
Wooden Warrior	Custom designed wooden family coaster	2011	The Gravity Group
Thrill Rides
Reverse Time	Reverse Time	2016	SBF Visa Group
Paratrooper	Hydraulic Lift Paratrooper	1997	Frank Hrubetz & Co.
Super Himalaya	Music Fest	2023	Reverchon
Tidal Wave	Pirate 32	2020	SBF Visa Group
Bumper Cars	Bumper Cars	1979	JLGH
Free Fall'N	Drop Zone	2010	SBF Visa Group
Frantic	Frisbee	2015	Visa International
Family Rides
Helicopters	Helicopter	1958	Allan Herschell
Ghost Hunt			
Tilt-A-Whirl	Tilt-A-Whirl	1977	Sellner
Big Flush Water Coaster	Big Flush	1999	White Water
Grand Carousel	Grand Carousel	1990	Chance Rides
Quassy Express Train	C.P. Huntington	1948	Chance Rides
Crazy Cups	Midi Tea Cup	2012	Zamperla
Skipper's Clippers	Visa Pirate Jet	2017	SBF Visa Group
Up, Up & Away	Samba Balloon	2017	Zamperla
Aladdin Wave Swinger	Yo-Yo	2025	Wooddesign Amusement Rides
Kiddie Rides
Jet Fighters	Sky Fighter	1952	Allan Herschell
Boat Ride	Kiddie Boat Ride	1952	Allan Herschell
Frog Hopper	Frog Hopper	2000	S&S Worldwide
Kiddie Bumper Cars		2015	VISA International
Splash Away Bay Water Park Rides
Saturation Station	WaterColors	2003	SCS Interactive
Tunnel Twisters	Tunnel Twisters	2006	ProSlide Technology
BulletBowl	BulletBowl	2013	ProSlide Technology
FreeFALL Extreme Bodyslides	FreeFALL	2013	ProSlide Technology
Fish Pond	Splashpad	2013	Vortex Aquatic Structures
Slide City	(various models)	2016	ProSlide Technology
Category 5 Rapids Raft Rides	(various models)	2018	ProSlide Technology
Rocket Rapids Water Coaster	Water Coaster	2022	ProSlide Technology
Attractions
Quassy Beach	Lakeside Beach	-	-
Quassy Quest Laser Maze	Laser Tag	-	-
Quassy Queen	Excursion Boat	-	-
Redemption Arcade	Arcade	-	-
Midway Games	Game Booths	-	-
Quassy Zoo	Fiberglass Animals	-	-

=== Defunct attractions ===
Ride name	Attraction Type	Opening year	Closing year	Manufacturer
Wild Mouse	Wild Mouse	1960	1983	B. A. Schiff
Mad Mouse	Monster Mouse	1983	2010	Allan Herschell
Trabant		1965	2015	
Dune Buggies		1972	2016	
Space Age		1983	2016	
Galleon	Galleon 33	2008	2019	Zamperla
Yo-Yo Swing	Yo-Yo	2004	2024	Chance Rides

== Gallery ==
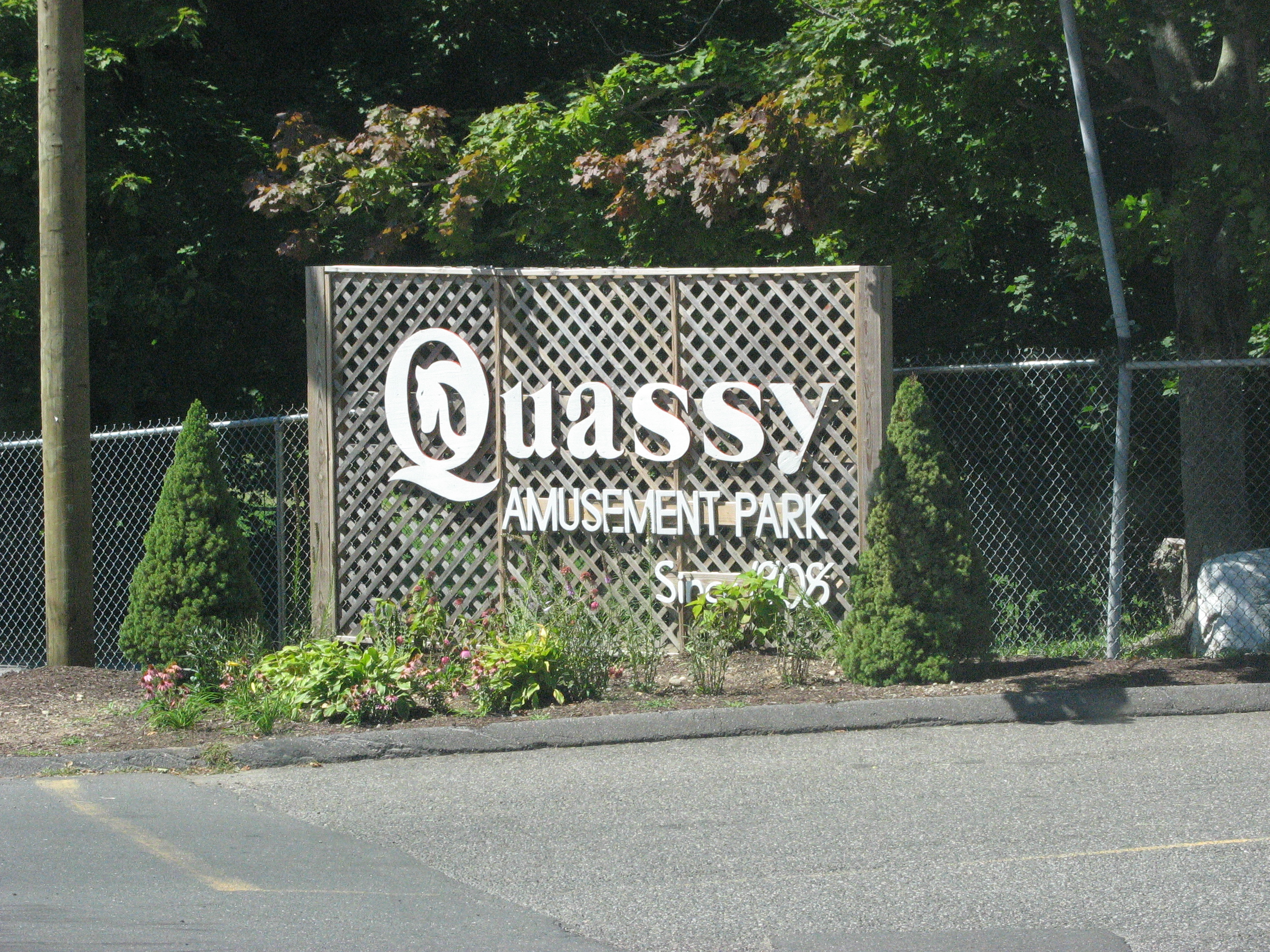
Entrance

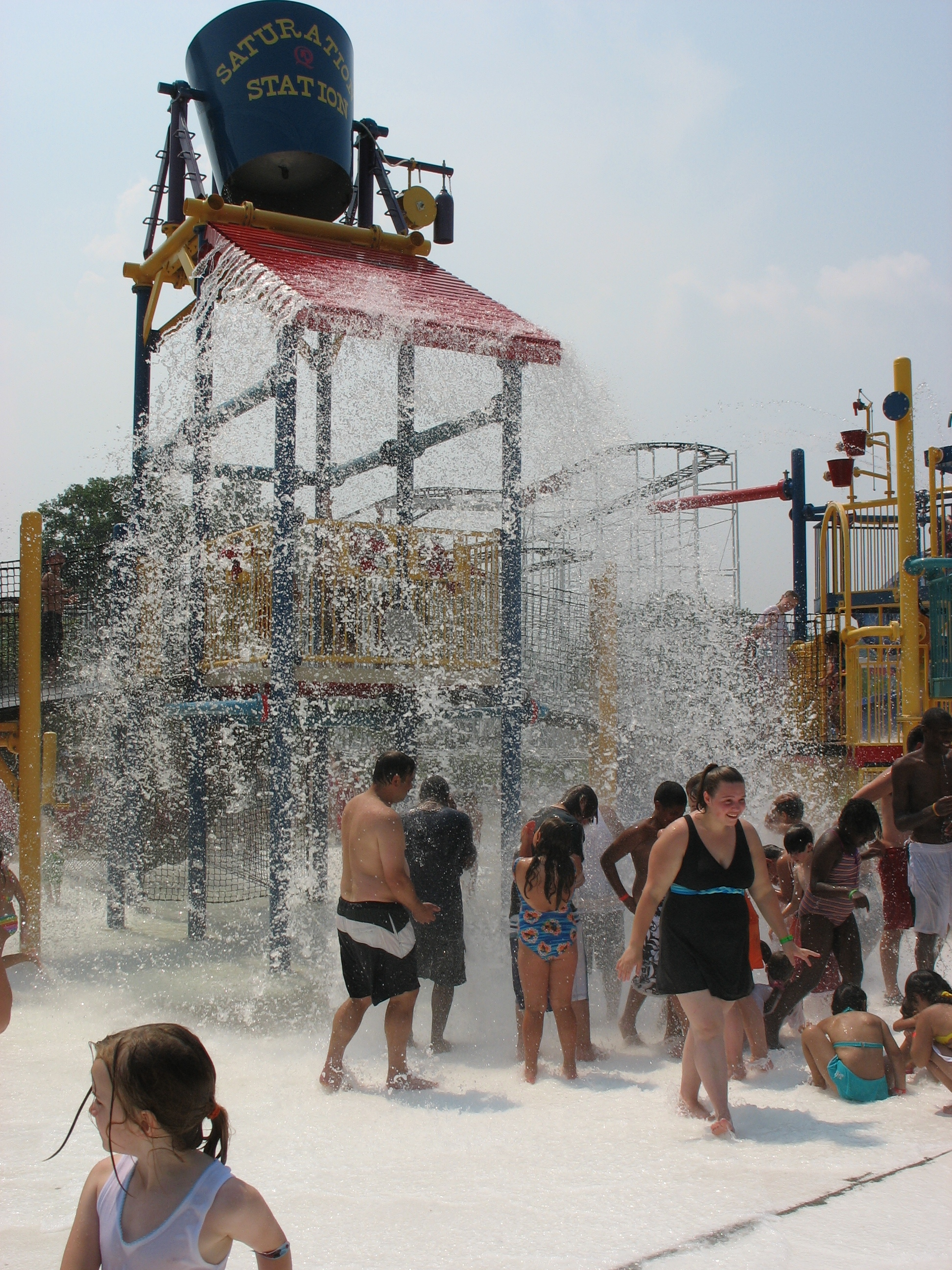
Saturation Station

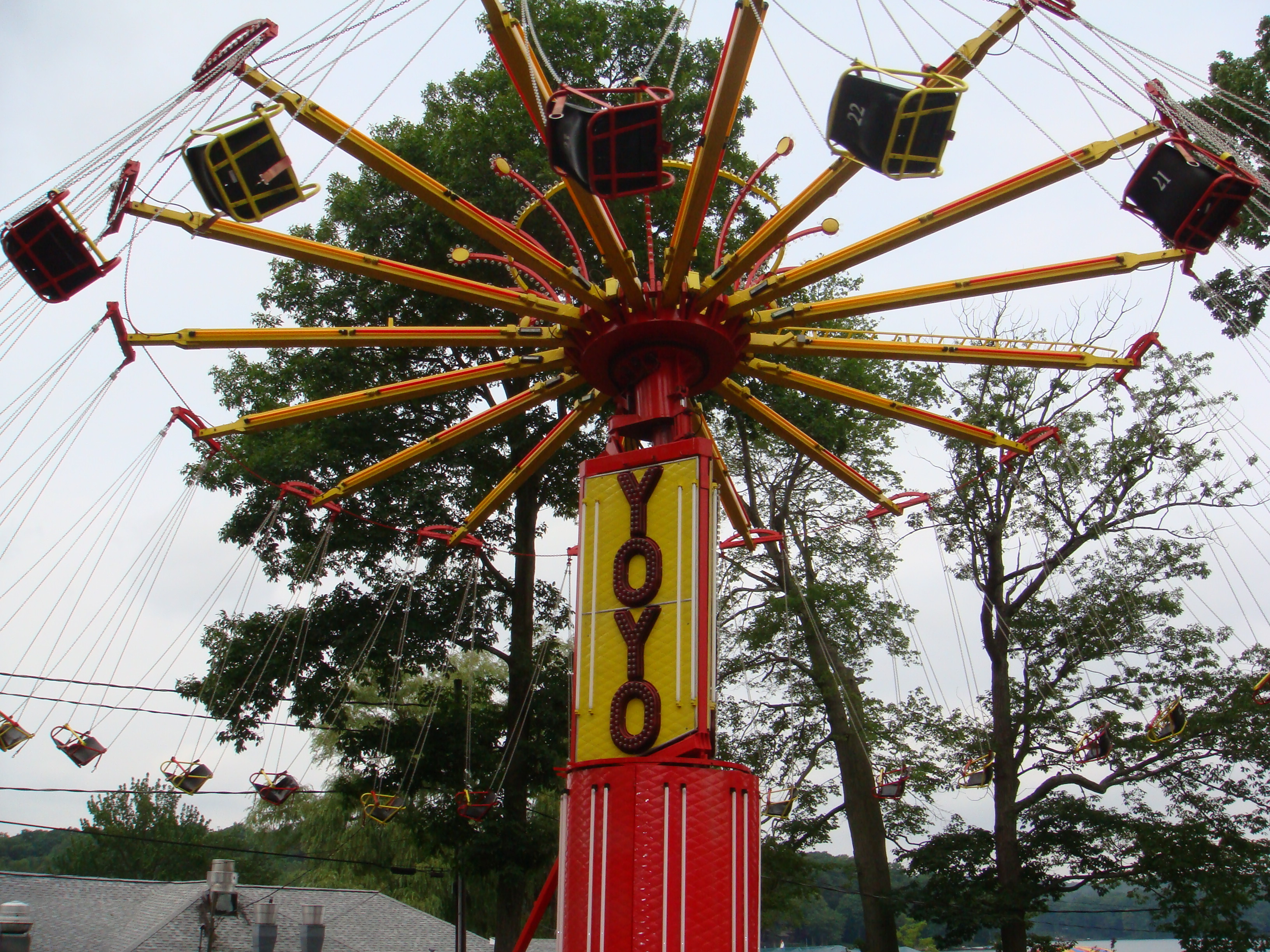
YoYo ride

== See also ==
- List of amusement parks in New England
- Lake Compounce
