= The Gravity Group =

American roller coaster manufacturer

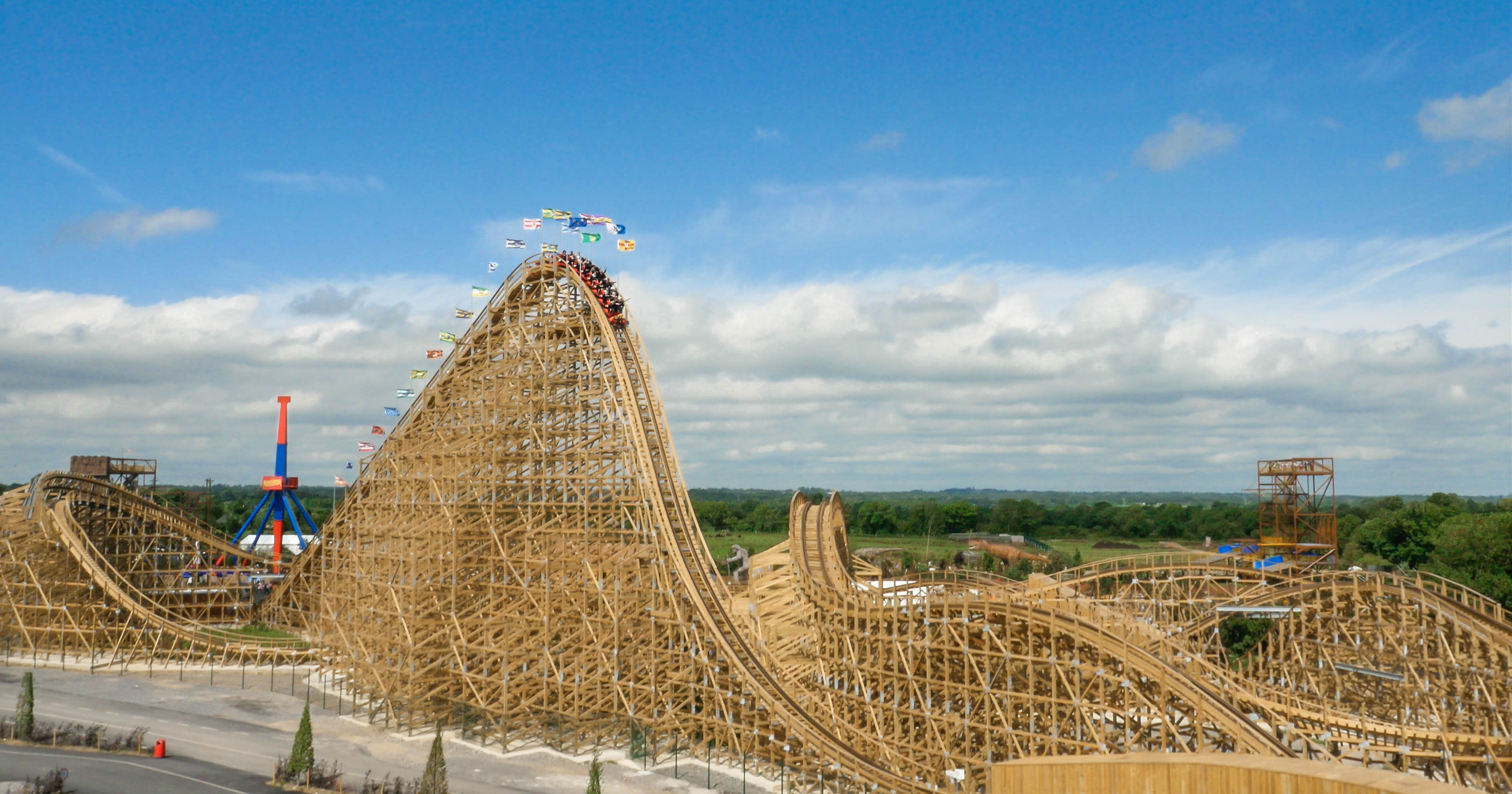
- The Cú Chulainn Coaster at Emerald Park, designed by The Gravity Group
- Industry: Manufacturing
- Founded: July 2002
- Founder: Former Custom Coasters International employees
- Headquarters: Cincinnati, Ohio, United States
- Area served: Worldwide
- Products: Roller coasters, roller coaster trains, roller coaster retracking
- Divisions: Gravitykraft Corporation, Gravity Works, LLC
- Website: www.thegravitygroup.com

The Gravity Group is a wooden roller coaster design firm based in Cincinnati, Ohio. The firm was founded in July 2002 by several members of the engineering team of the defunct Custom Coasters International following the latter's bankruptcy. The core group of designers and engineers at The Gravity Group have backgrounds in civil, structural, and mechanical engineering. Their experience comes from work on over 40 different wooden roller coasters around the world.

Many of The Gravity Group's projects have been well-received by the amusement industry, including The Voyage, Hades 360, and Ravine Flyer II. They also offer coaster trains known as Timberliners, and retracking services with precut track for wooden coasters.

== Roller coaster projects ==
The first coaster designed by The Gravity Group opened in 2005 as Hades at Mt. Olympus Water & Theme Park Resort in Wisconsin Dells, Wisconsin. It won Best New Ride of 2005 in Amusement Today's Golden Ticket Awards. The Gravity Group also designed The Voyage at Holiday World & Splashin' Safari in Santa Claus, Indiana, which opened in May 2006 and is the second-longest wooden roller coaster in the world. It won Best New Ride of 2006 and has been acclaimed as one of the world's best wooden coasters every year since.

In 2007, The Gravity Group designed Boardwalk Bullet at Kemah Boardwalk, which opened as the only wooden coaster in the Greater Houston area. The Gravity Group designed Ravine Flyer II at Waldameer & Water World in Erie, Pennsylvania, which opened in May 2008 and won Best New Ride of 2008, and has been acclaimed in years since as one of the world's best wooden coasters. In 2009, Wooden Coaster - Fireball opened at Happy Valley in China, becoming China's first wooden roller coaster. In 2011, Quassy Amusement Park in Middlebury, Connecticut opened Wooden Warrior, the company's sixth wooden roller coaster. Timberliners, the company's signature coaster trains, debuted on Wooden Warrior as well. Also in 2011, The Gravity Group was involved in the recreation of Libertyland's Zippin Pippin at Bay Beach Amusement Park in Green Bay, Wisconsin, as well as the construction of Twister at Gröna Lund in Sweden. In 2012, The Gravity Group designed Dauling Dragon in Happy Valley Wuhan, which opened as China's first racing coaster. They designed Fjord Flying Dragon at China's Happy Valley Tianjin in 2013. In 2014, they designed Roar-O-Saurus at Story Land in Glen, New Hampshire, and Time Travel at Hot Go Park in China.

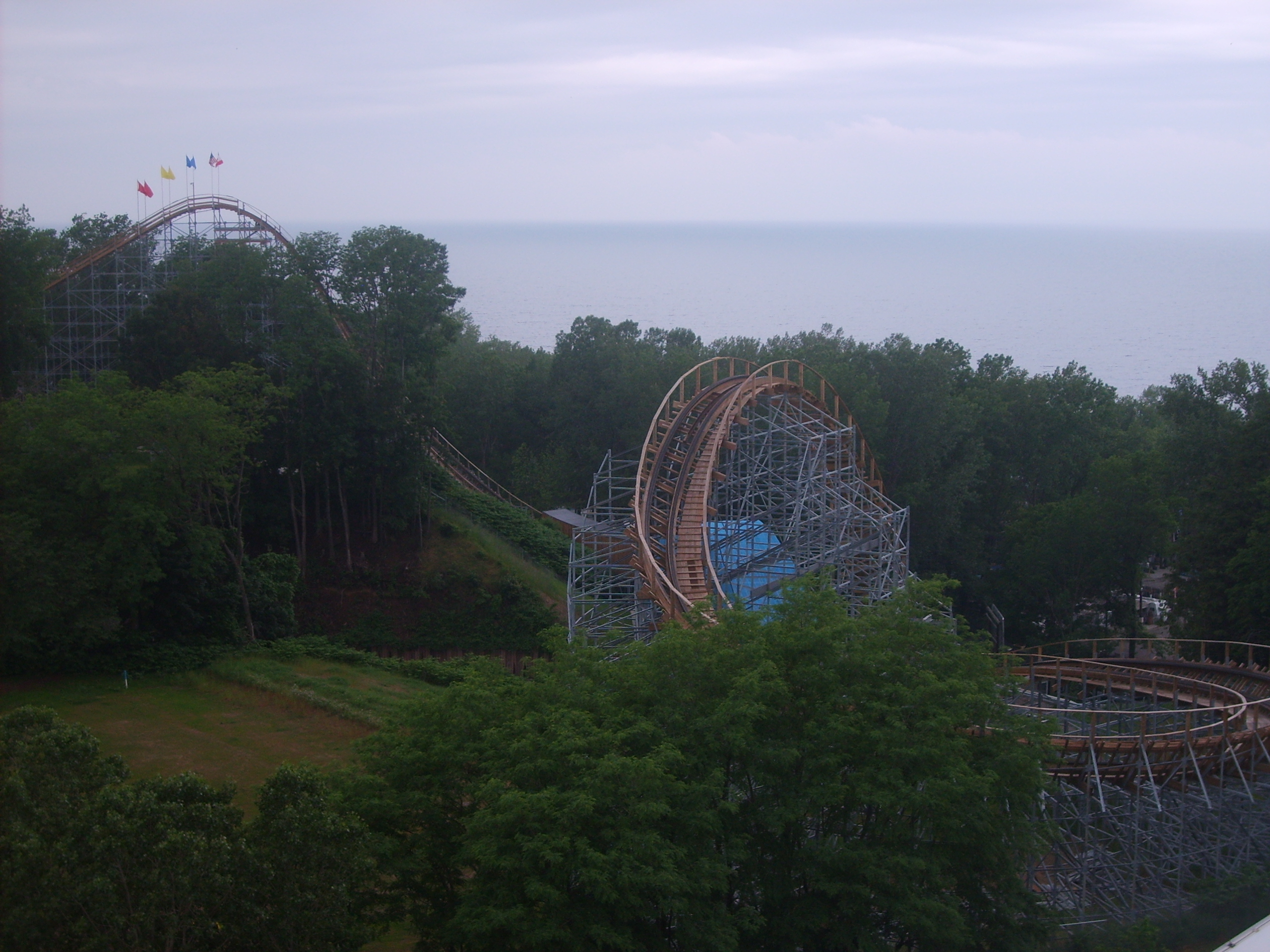
Ravine Flyer II was the fourth ride designed by The Gravity Group

Five The Gravity Group coasters opened in 2015, most notably The Cú Chulainn Coaster at Emerald Park in Ireland, and Switchback at ZDT's Amusement Park in Seguin, Texas, the latter of which is the only wooden shuttle coaster in existence. Three coasters named Jungle Trailblazer opened in 2015 as well at various Fantawild parks in China, two of which contain inversions, a rarity on wooden coasters. In 2016, three The Gravity Group coasters opened, including two more under the name Jungle Trailblazer (one of which has an inversion) at Chinese Fantawild parks, and one called Timber at Walibi Rhône-Alpes in France. In 2017, The Gravity Group designed another coaster named Jungle Trailblazer in China, and Mine Blower at Fun Spot America – Kissimmee in Florida, the latter of which has a unique inversion.

In 2018, The Gravity Group worked with Sesame Place Philadelphia to install Oscar's Wacky Taxi. Also in 2018, their most recent Jungle Trailblazer opened in China, as well as a coaster called Wood Express at Parc Saint Paul in France. In 2019, the company designed Kentucky Flyer, which opened at Kentucky Kingdom as a celebration of the park's 30th anniversary. They also designed Wooden Dragons Roller Coaster, which opened in 2021 at Sunac Jinan in China. In 2022, The Gravity Group designed Leviathan, which opened at Sea World Gold Coast Australia as Australia's first new wooden coaster in 35 years. The company's most recent roller coaster, The Bobcat, opened at Six Flags Great Escape and Hurricane Harbor in 2024. In 2025, Switchback closed alongside its park. In 2026, ZDT's Amusement Park posted online that Switchback had been purchased by and relocated to another park. The park was not made public at the time of the announcement, but it was later revealed that the ride had been purchased by IB Parks & Entertainment. Also in 2026, it was announced that a new coaster from The Gravity Group, later revealed to be named Durango, would be opening in 2027 at MagicLand in Italy. Another coaster from The Gravity Group to be built for 2027 is Midnight Showdown at Kentucky Kingdom. Midnight Showdown will be the world's largest enclosed wooden roller coaster.

== List of roller coasters ==
As of 2026, The Gravity Group has designed 30 roller coasters around the world.

| Name | Model | Park | Country | Opened | Status | Ref |
|---|---|---|---|---|---|---|
| Hades 360; Formerly Hades | Steel Support Structure; Timberliner train Formerly Philadelphia Toboggan Coasters trains | Mt. Olympus Water & Theme Park Resort | United States | 2005 | Operating | |
| The Voyage | Steel Support Structure; Philadelphia Toboggan Coasters trains | Holiday World & Splashin' Safari | United States | 2006 | Operating | |
| Boardwalk Bullet | Wood Support Structure; Philadelphia Toboggan Coasters trains | Kemah Boardwalk | United States | 2007 | Operating | |
| Ravine Flyer II | Steel Support Structure; Philadelphia Toboggan Coasters trains | Waldameer & Water World | United States | 2008 | Operating | |
| Wooden Coaster - Fireball | Wood Support Structure; Philadelphia Toboggan Coasters trains | Happy Valley Shanghai | China | 2009 | Operating | |
| Wooden Warrior | Wood Support Structure; Timberliner train | Quassy Amusement Park | United States | 2011 | Operating | |
| Twister | Steel Support Structure; Timberliner trains | Gröna Lund | Sweden | 2011 | Operating | |
| Zippin Pippin | Wood Support Structure; Philadelphia Toboggan Coasters trains | Bay Beach Amusement Park | United States | 2011 | Operating | |
| Dauling Dragon | Wood Support Structure; Philadelphia Toboggan Coasters trains | Happy Valley Wuhan | China | 2012 | Operating | |
| Fjord Flying Dragon | Wood Support Structure; Philadelphia Toboggan Coasters trains | Happy Valley Tianjin | China | 2013 | Operating | |
| Roar-O-Saurus | Wood Support Structure; Timberliner train | Story Land | United States | 2014 | Operating | |
| Time Travel | Wood Support Structure; Timberliner trains | Hot Go Park | China | 2014 | Operating | |
| The Cú Chulainn Coaster | Wood Support Structure; Timberliner trains | Emerald Park | (Republic of Ireland) Ireland | 2015 | Operating | |
| Switchback | Steel Support Structure; Timberliner trains | Unknown IB Parks & Entertainment park ZDT's Amusement Park | United States | 2028 2015 | style="background: #FF8; color:black; vertical-align: middle; text-align: center; " class="table-maybe"|Under relocation | |
| Jungle Trailblazer | Wood Support Structure; Timberliner trains | Oriental Heritage Jinan | China | 2015 | Standing but not operating | |
| Jungle Trailblazer | Wood Support Structure; Timberliner trains | Fantawild Dreamland Zhengzhou | China | 2015 | Standing but not operating | |
| Jungle Trailblazer | Wood Support Structure; Timberliner trains | Oriental Heritage Wuhu | China | 2015 | Operating | |
| Timber | Wood Support Structure; Timberliner trains | Walibi Rhône-Alpes | France | 2016 | Operating | |
| Jungle Trailblazer | Wood Support Structure; Timberliner trains | Oriental Heritage Ningbo | China | 2016 | Operating | |
| Jungle Trailblazer | Wood Support Structure; Philadelphia Toboggan Coasters trains | Fantawild Dreamland Zhuzhou | China | 2016 | Operating | |
| Mine Blower | Steel Support Structure; Timberliner trains | Fun Spot America – Kissimmee | United States | 2017 | Operating | |
| Jungle Trailblazer | Wood Support Structure; Timberliner trains | Oriental Heritage Xiamen | China | 2017 | Operating | |
| Oscar's Wacky Taxi | Steel Support Structure; Timberliner trains | Sesame Place Philadelphia | United States | 2018 | Operating | |
| Wood Express | Steel Support Structure; Timberliner trains | Parc Saint Paul | France | 2018 | Operating | |
| Jungle Trailblazer | Wood Support Structure; Timberliner trains | Fantawild Asian Legend | China | 2018 | Operating | |
| Kentucky Flyer | Steel Support Structure; Timberliner trains | Kentucky Kingdom | United States | 2019 | Operating | |
| Wooden Dragons Roller Coaster | Wood Support Structure; Timberliner trains | Sunac Jinan | China | 2021 | Operating | |
| Leviathan | Wood Support Structure; Timberliner trains | Sea World Gold Coast Australia | Australia | 2022 | Operating | |
| The Bobcat | Wood Support Structure; Timberliner trains | Six Flags Great Escape and Hurricane Harbor | United States | 2024 | Operating | |
| Durango | Wood Support Structure; Timberliner train | MagicLand | Italy | 2027 | Under construction | |
| Midnight Showdown | Steel Support Structure; Timberliner train | Kentucky Kingdom | United States | 2027 | Under construction | |

== Precut track and retracking projects ==
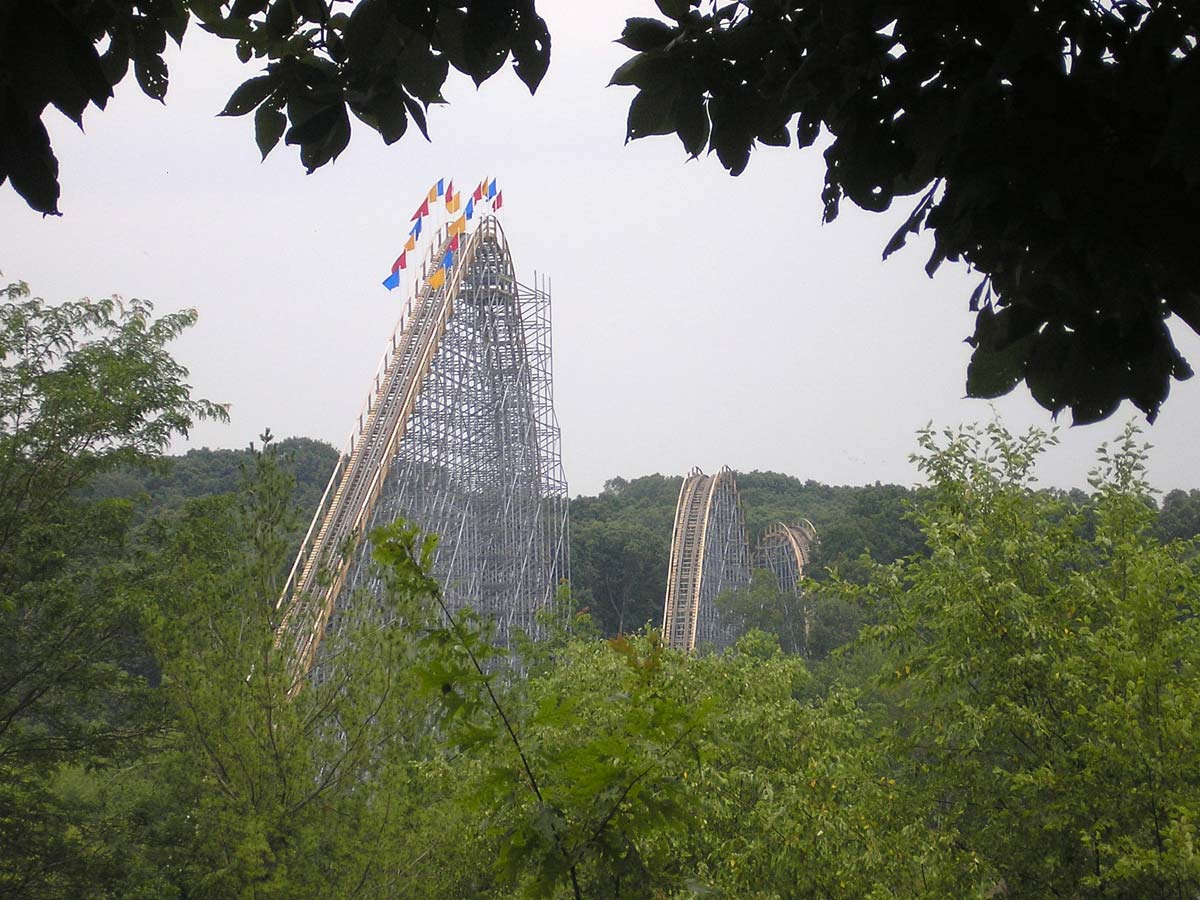
The Voyage is the largest coaster The Gravity Group has designed

The Gravity Group retracks wooden roller coasters with their engineered precut track, sometimes on rides they did not initially design. They received the award for Innovation of the Year at the 2021 Golden Ticket Awards for their precut track, which employs vertically stacked wood beneath traditional horizontally stacked wood, allowing for a smoother ride experience and less constant retracking. Precut track was engineered out of a desire to keep wooden coasters from being retracked with steel track just to give a smoother ride. Since 2019, they have worked on a total of 45 different projects on 27 different rides with their precut track. This list displays only rides not originally built by The Gravity Group that have received precut track.

| Name | Park | Country | Year of retrack | Status | Ref |
|---|---|---|---|---|---|
| Tonnerre 2 Zeus | Parc Astérix | France | 2019–22 | Operating | |
| The Racer | Kings Island | United States | 2021 | Operating | |
| The Beast | Kings Island | United States | 2021–22; 2025 | Operating | |
| Grizzly | Kings Dominion | United States | 2022–23 | Operating | |
| Wildcat | Lake Compounce | United States | 2023–24 | Operating | |
| Megafobia | Oakwood Theme Park | United Kingdom | 2023 | Closed | |
| Excalibur | Funtown Splashtown USA | United States | 2023 | Operating | |
| Mighty Canadian Minebuster | Canada's Wonderland | Canada | 2024–25 | Operating | |
| Raven | Holiday World & Splashin' Safari | United States | 2025 | Operating | |
| Woodland Run | Kentucky Kingdom | United States | 2025 | Operating | |
| Timber Wolf | Worlds of Fun | United States | 2026 | Operating | |

== Timberliner trains ==
In 2008, The Gravity Group announced the development of their own wooden coaster trains called Timberliners. They are produced by Gravitykraft Corporation, a sister company to The Gravity Group. The Gravity Group promotes their trains as wooden coaster trains capable of steering smoothly through curves and banked track, resulting in a more comfortable and maintenance-friendly ride. Timberliners were planned to debut on The Voyage at Holiday World for the 2010 season, but after three years of delays and issues, Holiday World officially cancelled the project on August 16, 2013. In 2011, Timberliners instead debuted on Wooden Warrior and Twister. In 2013, Timberliners were installed on Hades as part of its transformation to Hades 360.

The Gravity Group's Timberliner trains have since appeared on Roar-O-Saurus and Time Travel in 2014, The Cú Chulainn Coaster, Jungle Trailblazer (Oriental Heritage Jinan), Jungle Trailblazer (Fantawild Dreamland), Jungle Trailblazer (Oriential Heritage Wuhu), and Switchback in 2015, Timber and Jungle Trailblazer (Oriental Heritage Ningbo) in 2016, Jungle Trailblazer (Oriental Heritage Xiamen) and Mine Blower in 2017, Oscar's Wacky Taxi, Wood Express, and Jungle Trailblazer (Fantawild Asian Legend) in 2018, Kentucky Flyer in 2019, Wooden Dragons Roller Coaster in 2021, Leviathan and Tonnerre 2 Zeus in 2022, and The Bobcat in 2024. Timberliners will also run on Durango and Midnight Showdown when they open in 2027.
