= Emerald Park =

Amusement park in Ireland

- Previously known as Tayto Park (2010–2022)
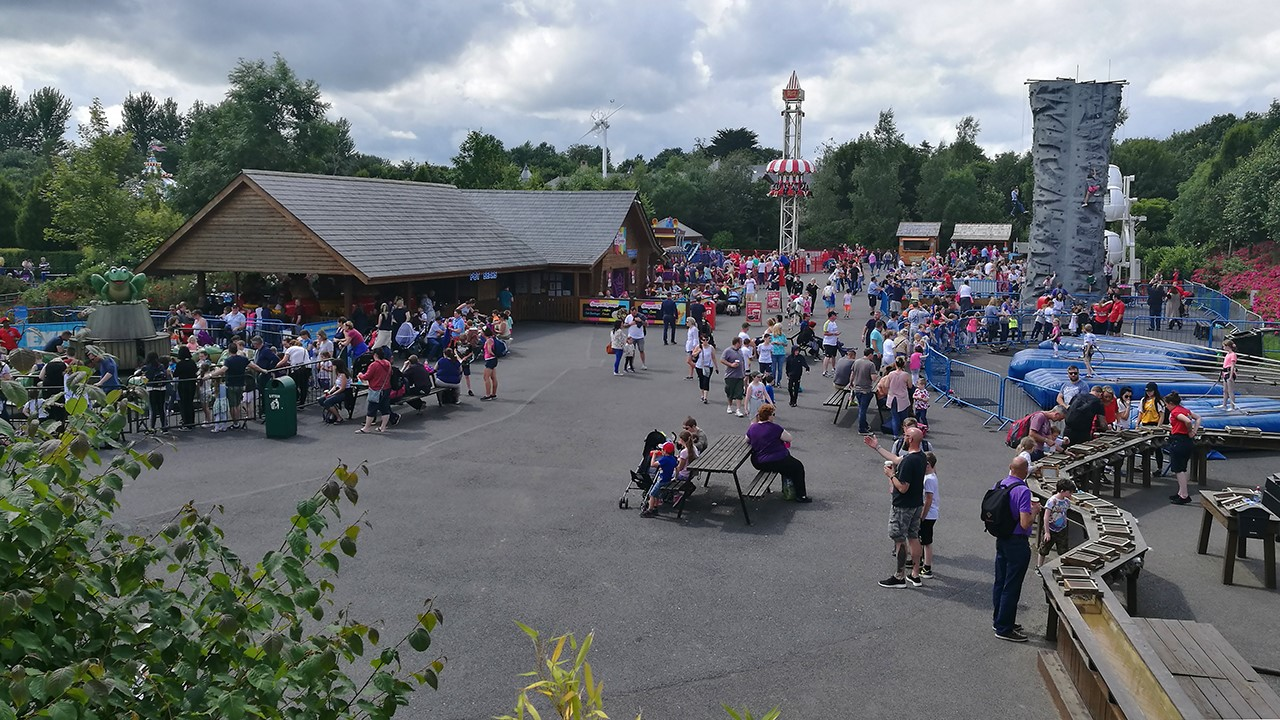
- Interactive map of Emerald Park
- Location: Kilbrew / Curraha, near Ashbourne, County Meath, Ireland
- Coordinates: 53.545377°N 6.459375°W
- Status: Operating
- Opened: 24 November 2010; 15 years ago
- Attendance: 750,000 (2015)
- Area: 55 acres (22 ha)

Attractions
- Total: 21
- Roller coasters: 6
- Water rides: 1
- Website: https://emeraldpark.ie

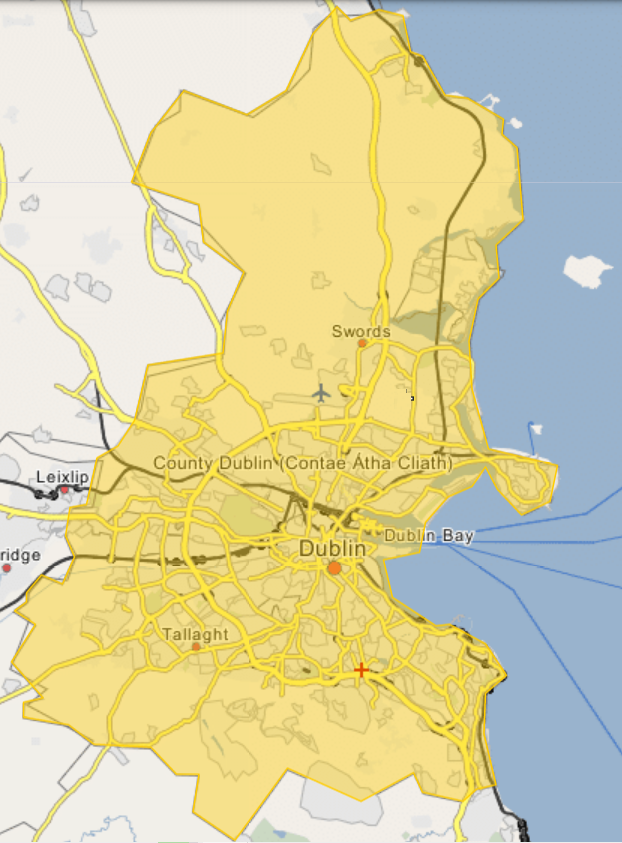
Location of Emerald Park (red dot) in Ireland, relative to County Dublin.

Emerald Park (Irish: Páirc Smaragaide), previously known from its 2010 opening to 2022 as Tayto Park, is a 22 ha (55-acre) amusement park and zoo located in the townland of Kilbrew, County Meath, Ireland, about 25 km (16 mi) northwest of Dublin. Upon opening, the park was themed around the Irish potato crisp brand Tayto (whose factory is adjacent to the park), and was originally conceptualised by Tayto’s then owner, farmer-turned-entrepreneur Raymond Coyle (d. 2022).

The park includes the only permanent rollercoasters in the Republic of Ireland, a Frisbee ride, adventure playgrounds and an exotic zoo.

== History ==
The park opened on 24 November 2010. It was designed by Stewart and Sinnott Architects, landscaper Anthony Ryan and designer Milo Fitzgerald, with an €8.5 million (€12.18 million today) investment from Ray Coyle, the potato farmer who established Largo Foods, and bought out the Tayto brand. The park developed 22 hectares of County Meath farmland into an American-style park. It is the sixth most popular paid-for attraction in Ireland, with 750,000 visitors in 2015. Visitors to the park also had the option to visit the factory on certain days.

During its early days, the park lacked rides and was much smaller, only containing the zoo area and playgrounds. Throughout the years, the park began to open rides beyond the zoo area and also became a full amusement park.

In February 2022, it was announced that the park, along with its elements would be rebranded in 2023 after Tayto Snacks - now owned by German company Intersnack - confirmed they would not be renewing their sponsorship agreement. On 29 September 2022, it was announced that the park would be renamed "Emerald Park" from 1 January 2023, with reference to Ireland's nickname of the "Emerald Isle."

== Attractions ==
=== General attractions ===
Emerald Park has a range of attractions for a range of ages, including a playground and smaller play areas, a maze, a "5D cinema", and arts and crafts, magic shows and face painting. There is also a circus tent.

=== Theme park rides ===
The park previously operated on a system of zones and payment tokens, with a paid option for unlimited usage, but moved to an all-access model (subject to age limits for certain rides—younger visitors are limited to the general attractions and some simpler theme park machines).

Name	Picture	Additional Information
The Cú Chulainn Coaster		A 36m (105’)-tall wooden roller coaster, manufactured by The Gravity Group, opened on 6 June 2015.
Na Fianna Force		Opened on 22nd of May 2024 as part of the Tír na nÓg area. A Suspended Thrill Coaster manufactured by Vekoma.
The Quest (roller coaster)	No image available	Opened on May 22nd 2024 as part of the Tír na nÓg area. A Family boomerang manufactured by Vekoma.
Celtic Dreamer		A Zierer Wave swinger in Tír na nÓg, themed after the story of the Children of Lir.
The Rotator		An inverting, spinning Maxi Dance Party 360 (frisbee) by Italian company SBF Visa Group. Reaches 31m high (104’). Opened in 2014.
Air Race		A Zamperla Air Race. Opened in 2015.
Viking Voyage		A WhiteWater Super Flume that contains 1.7mil litres of water with a 12m (40’) drop. Opened 16 June 2017.
Endeavour		A Zamperla Endeavour (super roundup) 48-person capacity models, where riders’ feet hang freely (similar to an inverted coaster); most models feature fully-enclosed, seated cars. Opened in 2016.
Flight School		An 11m (36’)-tall Zierer steel family roller coaster (opened 18 May 2019).
Dino Dash		An 11.7m (38’)-tall steel Vekoma Junior Coaster (opened 9 April 2022).
Ladybird Loop		SBF Visa Group spinning coaster (opened 1 August 2018).

=== Junior Zone ===
The Junior Zone features a 10-metre high Junior Drop Tower (by Zamperla), a steam train ride, a car driving experience manufactured by Nissan, a spinning roller coaster manufactured by Visa, a spinning boat non-water ride and a leaping ride manufactured by Zamperla.

=== The Zoo ===
Zoo habitat and animals at Emerald Park

Emerald Park contains a zoo accredited with BIAZA and EAZA. It holds a diverse animal collection, with several conservation-dependent species. Access to the zoo is included in the entry to Emerald Park. The zoo, which has won awards, is committed to conservation education and research. The collection features animals including big cats, primates, exotic birds, rare breeds of farm animals as well as native Irish birds of prey. There are also three "visitor experiences": a "petting farm", the "World of Raptors" free-flying bird of prey display, and a "Lemur Walk" path through an enclosure.

== Development plans ==
A new themed area of the park called "Tír na nÓg" was opened on 22 May 2024, based on Celtic mythology. Plans for the area included two rollercoaster models from Vekoma, a Suspended Thrill Coaster and a Family Boomerang.

== Incidents ==
Tayto's Twister slide

A number of minor incidents have occurred within Emerald Park.

In June 2012, a former employee who was working as a tour guide broke her ankle after she went down a sixty-foot slide called Tayto's Twister. The slide was not open to the public at the time but she, along with other employees, were told to try it so that they could "get a feel of it". She sued Ashbourne Visitor Centre Ltd, trading as Tayto Park, as a result of the accident. She also sued Hags Aneby AB of Sweden and Spraoi Linn Ltd, the manufacturer and supplier of the slide respectively. The case was settled out of court. Following the accident, the ride was altered in relation to how steep it was and at the turns. A year later, a boy suffered a kidney injury when falling as he got off the slide. He received €63,000 in compensation. The slide was opened again after this incident, it continued operation until 2023 and it has since seemingly been permanently closed.

In October 2016, a wooden staircase in one of the park's Halloween attractions, "House of Horrors" suddenly collapsed, injuring nine people.

A 13 year-old boy named Morris Man De' Pores suffered whiplash after a ride on the Dino Dash.
