= Ashbourne, County Meath =

Commuter town in County Meath, Ireland

Ashbourne Cill Dhéagláin (Irish)
- Town
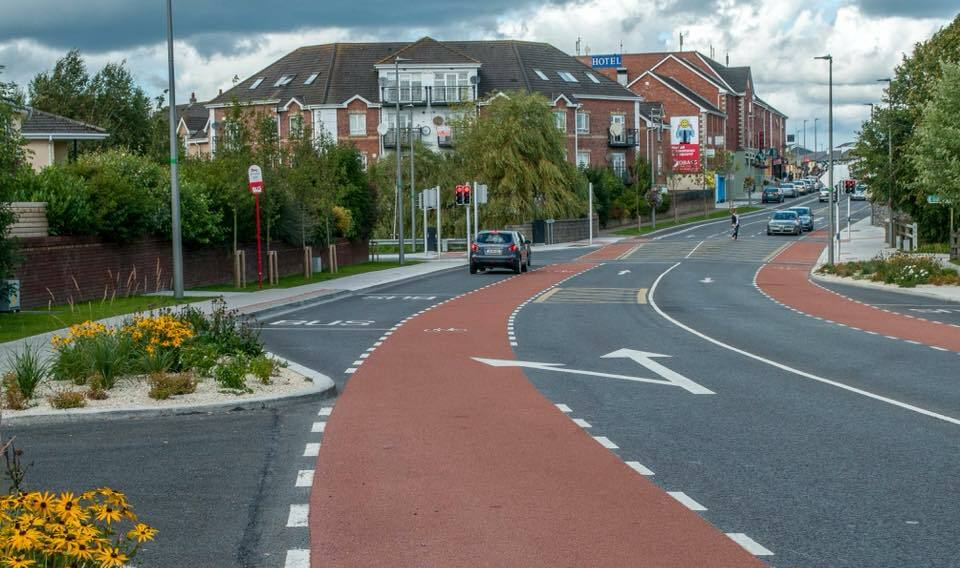
- Bridge Street, Ashbourne

- Location in Ireland
- Coordinates: 53.512°N 6.398°W
- Country: Ireland
- Province: Leinster
- County: Meath
- Elevation: 73 m (240 ft)

Population (2022)
  - Total: 15,680
- Time zone: UTC±0 (WET)
  - Summer (DST): UTC+1 (IST)
- Eircode routing key: A84
- Telephone area code: +353(0)1

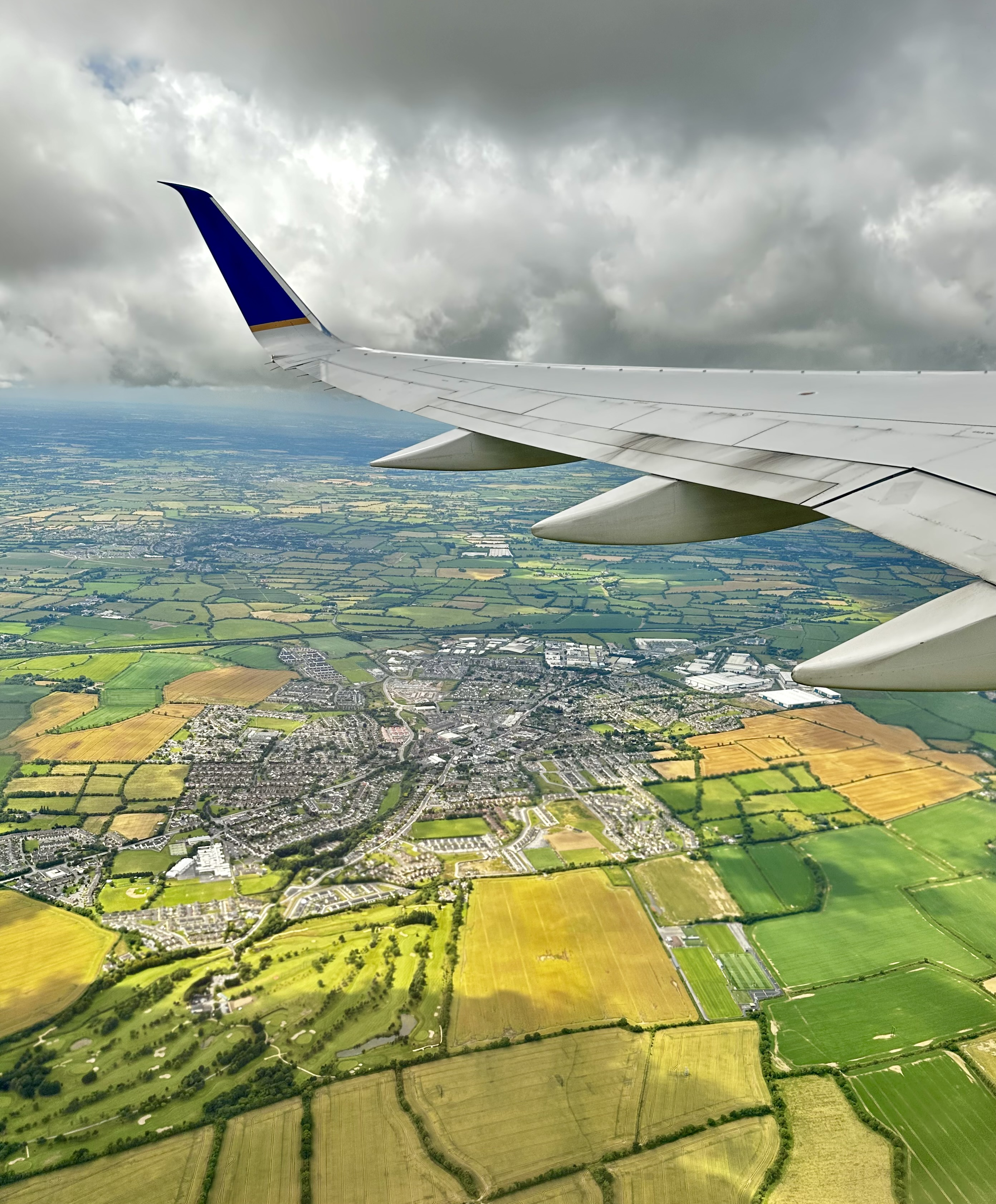
Looking west across Ashbourne from the air

Ashbourne (Irish: Cill Dhéagláin, meaning 'Déaglán's church') is a town in County Meath, Ireland. Located about 20 km north of Dublin and close to the M2 motorway, Ashbourne is a commuter town within Greater Dublin. In the 26 years between the 1996 and 2022 census, the town tripled in population from approximately 4,900 to 15,680 inhabitants. The town is passed by the Broad Meadow Water, which comes from Ratoath and Dunshaughlin.

== History ==
=== Ancient settlement and toponymy ===
Archaeological excavations in the area around Ashbourne have revealed evidence of settlement back to Neolithic times. In the townland of Rath, to the north of the town centre, a Bronze Age settlement was found during the construction of the M2 motorway. Archaeological excavations on the site of the Lidl supermarket revealed indications of the original medieval town, with several house remains, associated field systems, fish traps and mill races.

Other excavations, in the vicinity of the cemetery of Killegland, revealed the extent of the early Christian settlement, with souterrains, house sites and a large enclosure centred around the remains of the church that is visible in the cemetery. This would link the townland name of Killegland – meaning 'Declan's Church' – to pre-Patrician settlement in the area.

The town was recorded and known as Killegland, or Kildeglan, from at least the 13th century up to the late 19th century.

=== Norman and medieval development ===
Hugh de Lacy, Lord of Meath, set about building fortified houses, called mottes and baileys, in case the native Irish would regroup and attack. The remains of a motte and bailey structure can be found in Ratoath, 5 km from Ashbourne.

Once settled, Hugh de Lacy divided the land among his army. A large portion of Killeglan was given to a family called Wafre in 1220. This family lived there until 1420, the last member of this family having built a tower house (a fortified house, often misdescribed as a "castle"). The castle and lands became the property of the Segrave family, who remained owners until 1649. The first of the family recorded in Meath, Richard Sydgrave, was Chief Baron of the Irish Exchequer 1423–5. His son Patrick (living in 1445) married Mary Wafer, the heiress of Killeglan. They became one of the most influential and wealthy non-aristocratic families in Ireland during the 16th century, with two gaining the high political office of Chancellor of the Exchequer, while another became High Sheriff of Meath; Richard Segrave (died 1598) and his son Patrick Segrave were both judges of the Court of Exchequer (Ireland). However, their political power and possessions were removed during the religious wars of 1641 to 1650. Indeed, during the Cromwellian period, Oliver Cromwell's son, Henry, stayed for a time in Killeglan Castle. With the final subjugation of the native Irish after 1690, and the imposition of religious persecution in the Penal Laws, a new land-owner named Thomas Carter gained possession of the Killeglan lands. He did not live there, and the castle fell into disrepair and eventually into ruin. The Carter family held high office in Irish politics during the 18th century but their fortunes waned in the early 19th century. When the Carter estates were sold in the 1840s, the Killegland lands were bought by Frederick Bourne.

=== 19th century ===
Frederick Bourne was a rich entrepreneur who made his fortune from roads and transport. Before 1820 in Ireland roads were almost non-existent. Government regulations allowed for considerable spending on roads, and the subsequent improvements ensured greater post-coach services. Bourne owned a coach company and financed road-building, collecting revenue from tolls. He financed a ten-mile (old Irish miles) section of road from Dublin to Killegland. He decided to build a small town with an inn, a hotel and other small businesses to make money from travellers. He built this village near his ten-mile tollbooth and named the place after his favourite tree, and himself, i.e. Ash and Bourne. This began in 1820.

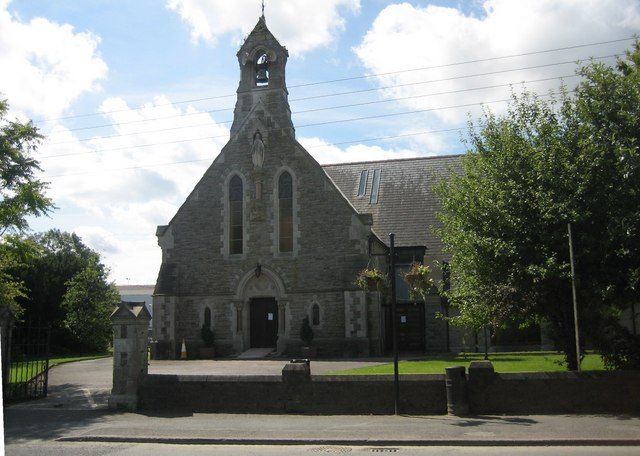
Asbourne's Catholic church, the Church of the Immaculate Conception on Frederick Street, was built in the 1880s.

Bourne's idea was a success. However, by 1850 rail was taking business from the roadways, and the Bourne family fortune declined. In 1821 the population was 133, by 1841 it was 411. The Irish famine took a toll from 1845 to 1851, and the population declined. Frederick Bourne left his land at Killegland, and his village of Ashbourne, to his son Richard in 1844. Richard lived in the village, and his first home is now the Ashbourne House Hotel on Frederick Street. Later he built a modest house on Castle Street near where the last remains of the Wafre and Segrave tower houses were. Richard married the daughter of a wealthy local family, Elizabeth Mangan, and had several children. The eldest, Thomas, became his father's heir and the last landlord of Ashbourne. He left Ireland and went to live in Northfleet, Kent, England, in 1899. The land was sold to the local tenants.

=== Easter Rising ===
On 28 April 1916, a group of Fingal Volunteers attacked the Royal Irish Constabulary barracks at Ashbourne. This event is documented in Ríocht na Mídhe, the journal of the Meath Archaeological and Historical Society, and other sources. The group were estimated to number 45 men and were under the command of Thomas Ashe, a national school teacher in Lusk with Richard Mulcahy acting as second-in-command. The barracks were usually manned by a sergeant and four constables but given the level of fighting in the capital, reinforcements had been called in from surrounding barracks and so on the day of the attack, there were 10 RIC men stationed there.

The rebels advanced on the barracks and disarmed two RIC men who were setting up a barricade outside the barracks. Ashe then called on the remaining officers to surrender and the siege situation turned into a shoot-out. Ultimately the RIC members offered to surrender by waving a white handkerchief. However, before they could emerge, a supporting convoy of cars and RIC reinforcements arrived from the direction of Slane. Ashe's force spread out and rushed along Slane road to stop the RIC convoy from reaching Rath Cross. The RIC reinforcements took fire from all sides. The firefight lasted several hours before volunteer reinforcements arrived from Boranstown. The RIC eventually surrendered to the volunteers. However, given that the uprising in Dublin had been put down, the Fingal volunteers eventually gave themselves up two days later. Thomas Ashe and his men were sentenced to death for their part in the attack, but this was later commuted to penal servitude for life.

==== Memorial events ====
Then President of Ireland, Seán T. O'Kelly, unveiled a memorial at Rath Cross Roads, Ashbourne, on Easter Sunday, 26 April 1959 to commemorate the Battle of Ashbourne. The story was covered on the front page of the Irish Times the next day. The memorial, designed by Con O'Reilly and Peter Grant, commemorates the battle and John Crenigan and Thomas Rafferty who were killed. The monument has two images: on one side the figure is in the form of Christ, and on the other side is a rebel.

On Easter Monday 2016, Rath Cross was the location of one of a number of 1916 centenary commemoration events. In September 2016, the monument was expanded with the addition of two side figures; one representing the Volunteers in uniform, the other a family.

== Population ==
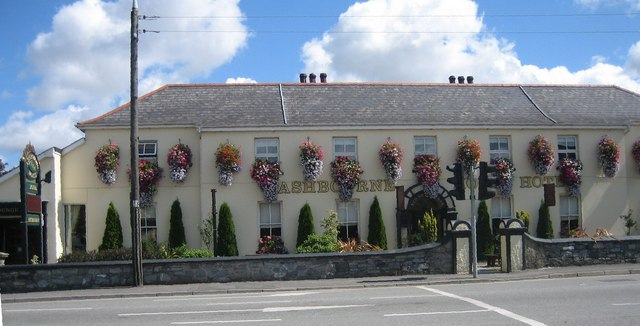
Ashbourne House Hotel

Historical population
Year	Pop.	±%
1991	4,411	—
1996	4,999	+13.3%
2002	6,362	+27.3%
2006	8,528	+34.0%
2011	11,355	+33.1%
2016	12,679	+11.7%
2022	15,680	+23.7%

Ashbourne was a small village with a population of under 400 until 1970. In response to the growing population of nearby Dublin, a scheme of houses was built in Ashbourne. The population has trebled since 1996, and in 2022 it was recorded at 15,680 people, making it Meath's second largest town by population after Navan, and the largest town in the Meath East Dáil constituency, which elects 4 TDs to the Dáil.

This growth coincided with a change in Ashbourne's demographics, with the 2006 census showing that over 12% of Ashbourne's population was born outside Ireland. The Lithuanian community is the second largest minority in Ashbourne after people from the United Kingdom. Almost one-fifth of all non-Irish born in the town are originally from Lithuania, and Lithuanian language services are held in the Church of the Immaculate Conception.

== Transport ==
=== Public transport ===
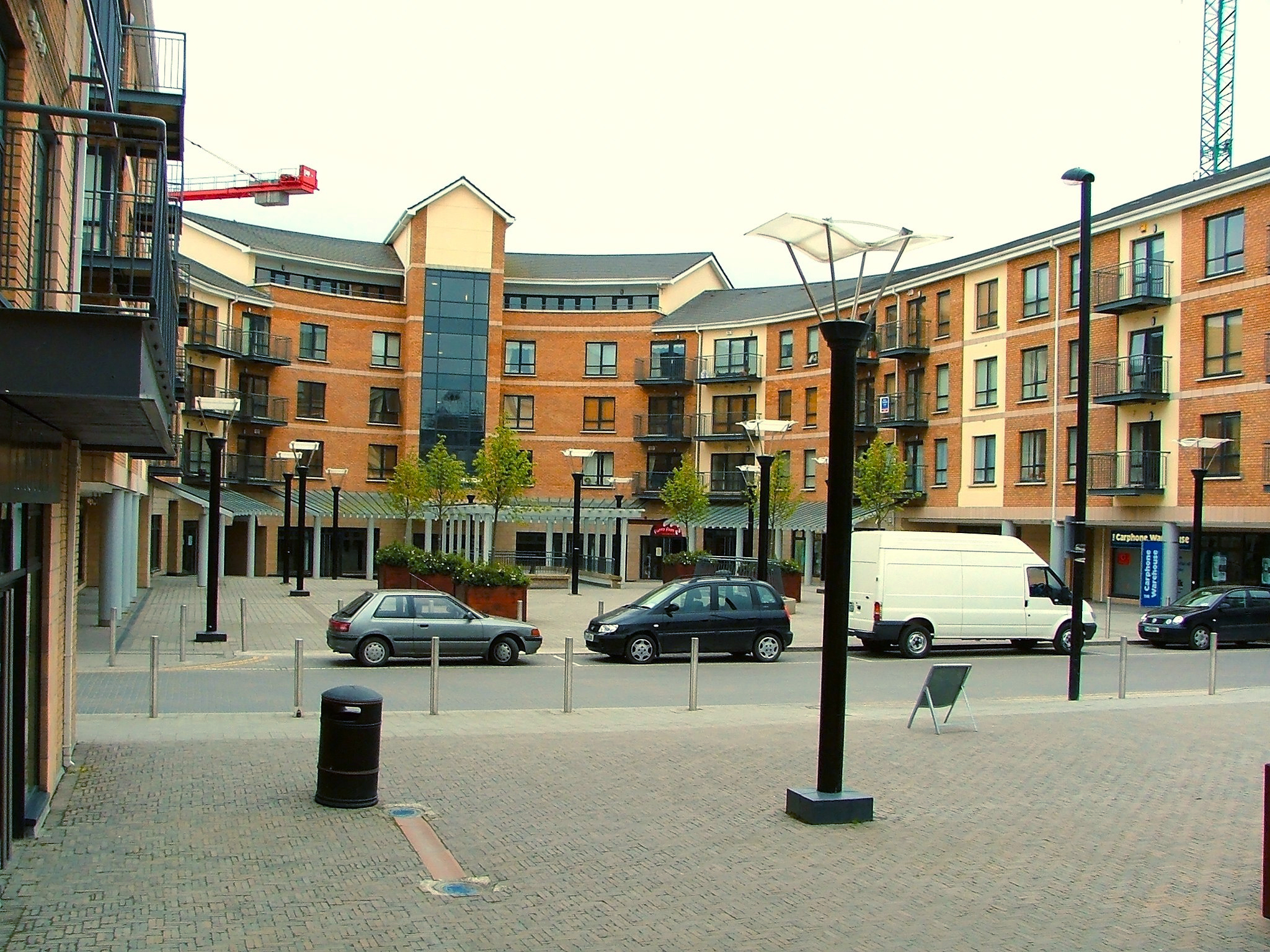
Apartments in centre of Ashbourne

Ashbourne is served by services from Bus Éireann, Ashbourne Connect and Dublin Bus. The latter provides nightlife city services in the 88N. Ashbourne Connect provides an express coach service direct to Dublin city centre and the southside of the city. The service is listed as 193 on the national journey planner. Bus Éireann provide a service (route 103) from Beresford Place, Dublin. Some of these services continue on to Ratoath, Kilmoon Cross and Duleek. Other services include Bus Éireann routes 105 (Blanchardstown - Drogheda), 109A (Dublin Airport - Kells), and Go-Ahead routes 195 (Balbriggan) and 197 (Swords).

=== Road ===
Ashbourne is linked to the M50 and Dublin city by 17 kilometres of motorway/dual-carriageway on the N2/M2 national primary route, which commences at junction 5 of the M50 motorway (13.5 km from Ashbourne). The road is a six-lane dual-carriageway from the M50 until exit 2, Cherryhound in County Dublin, where it becomes a motorway from there to the Rath roundabout, 1.5 km north of Ashbourne. The M2 incorporates a bypass of Ashbourne. The South Ashbourne Interchange, a junction taking traffic on and off the N2 near the Nine Mile Stone, allows traffic to transfer to and from Ashbourne and its bypass. Phase II of the M50 upgrade, opened in 2010, links the N2 to the M50 at exit 5.

== Amenities and retail ==
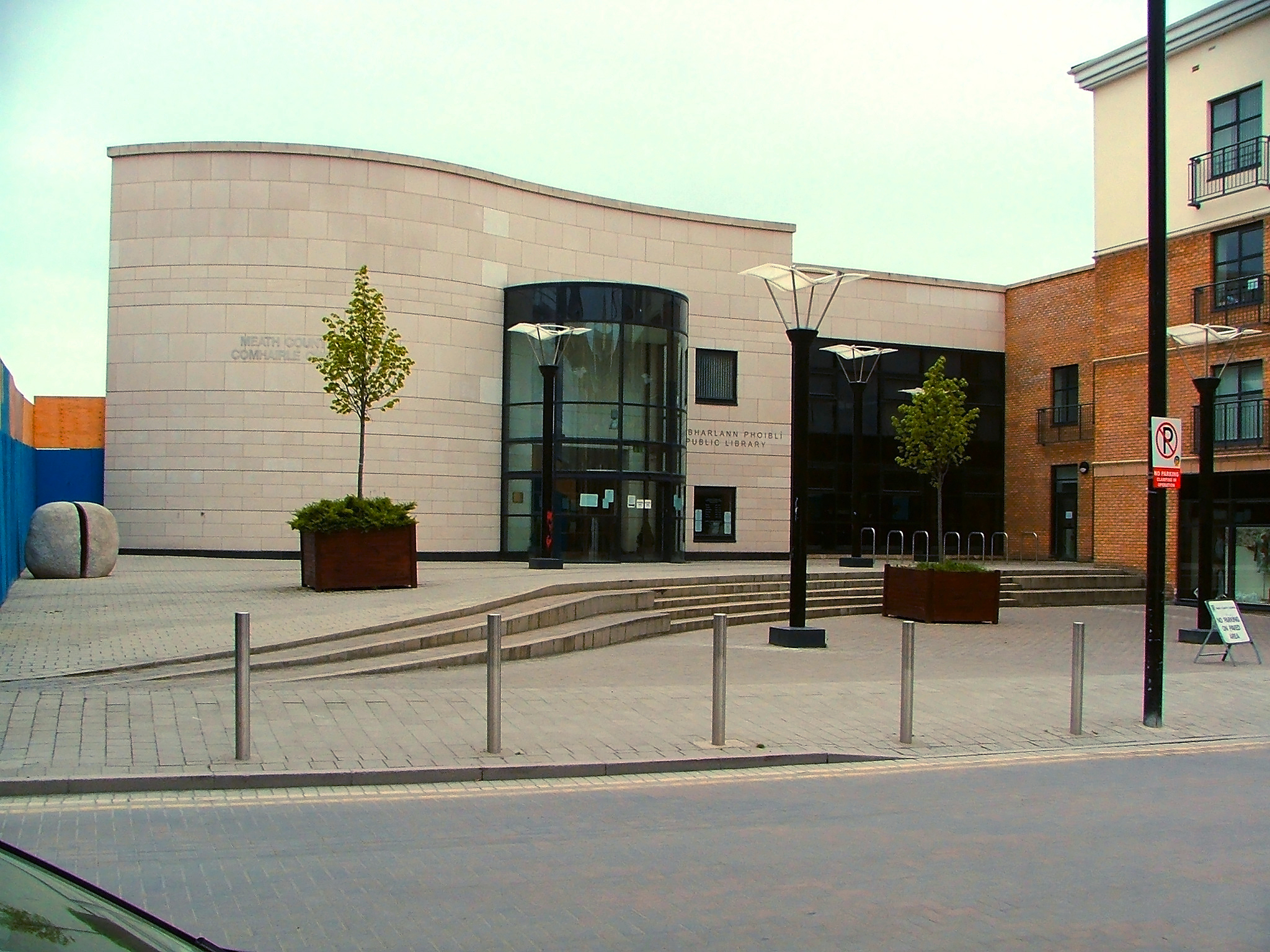
Council offices and Library

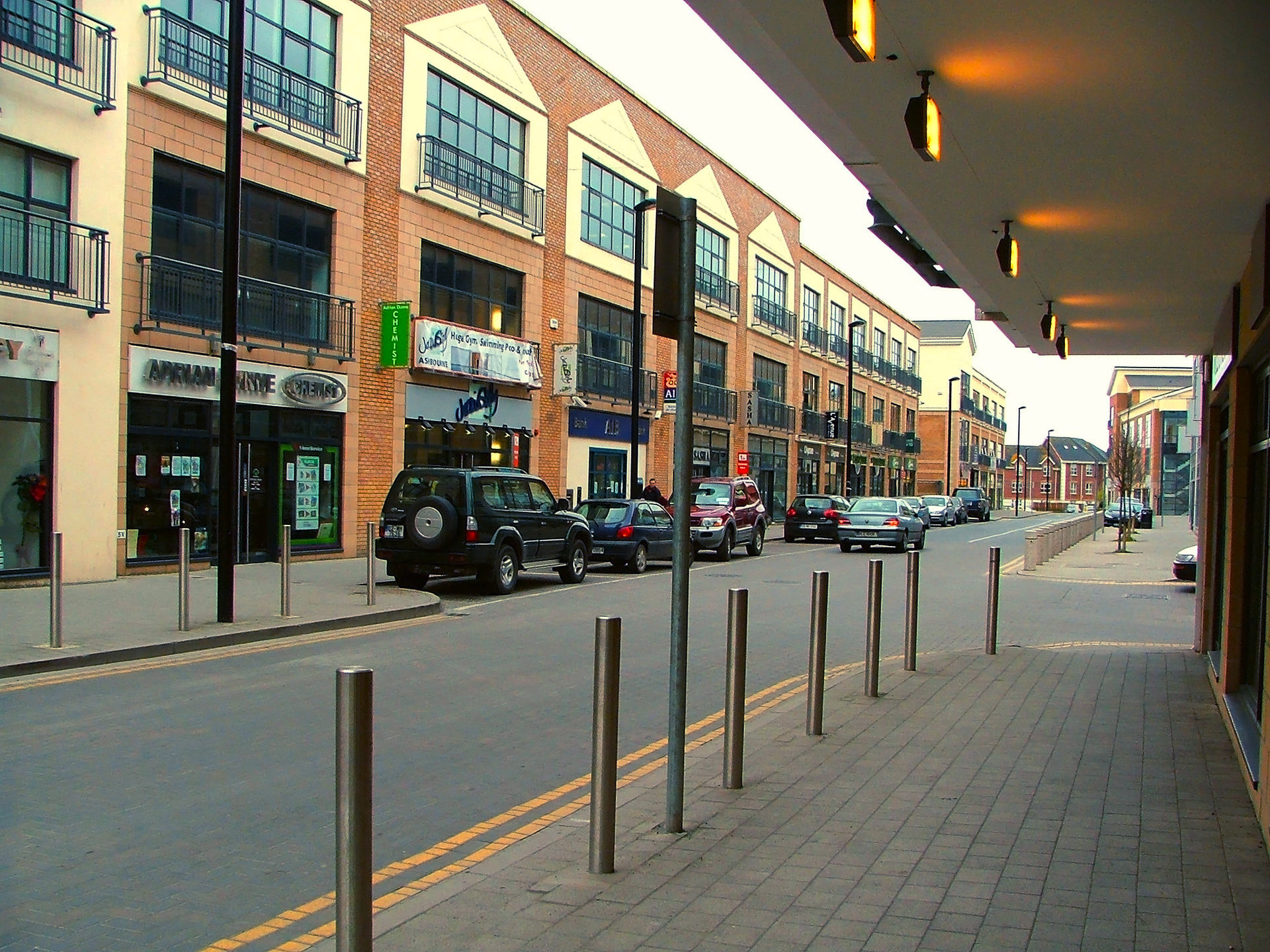
Killegland Street, Ashbourne's retail area

A series of shopping developments were built in Ashbourne, including facilities in the crescent and on Ashbourne High Street. In 2002, a local area plan for the town was completed which provided for additional development in Ashbourne. The plan provided for the expansion of Ashbourne westward into the townland of Killegland adjoining the new N2 Ashbourne bypass. It led to the introduction of residential units, a retail park, community facilities and industrial units.

Of the streets developed in Ashbourne's "new" town centre, Killegland Street has become a commercial street containing a number of retail units along with a library and council offices. Car parking in the town has been expanded by both underground car parking beneath Killegland Street (extending from Tesco to the Civic Offices) and a multi-storey car park above the retail units on the south end of the street.

A large supermarket has opened a large store on the former Dardis & Dunns seed merchant site on the northern end of Frederick/Main Street as part of the Ashbourne Town Centre development and is accessible from both Frederick Street, across from Ashbourne's original town centre and Killegland Square, linking the new retail area to the established centre in the town.

In 2007, Ashbourne Retail Park Limited applied for planning permission for an extension to the park.

The town's first cinema opened, in Ashbourne Retail Park, in 2009.

Emerald Park, an amusement park and zoo near Ashbourne which was formerly known as Tayto Park, opened in 2010 and has approximately 50 acres of activities. The park is home to one of Europe's largest wooden roller coasters, The Cú Chulainn Coaster, which opened in June 2015.

== Religion ==
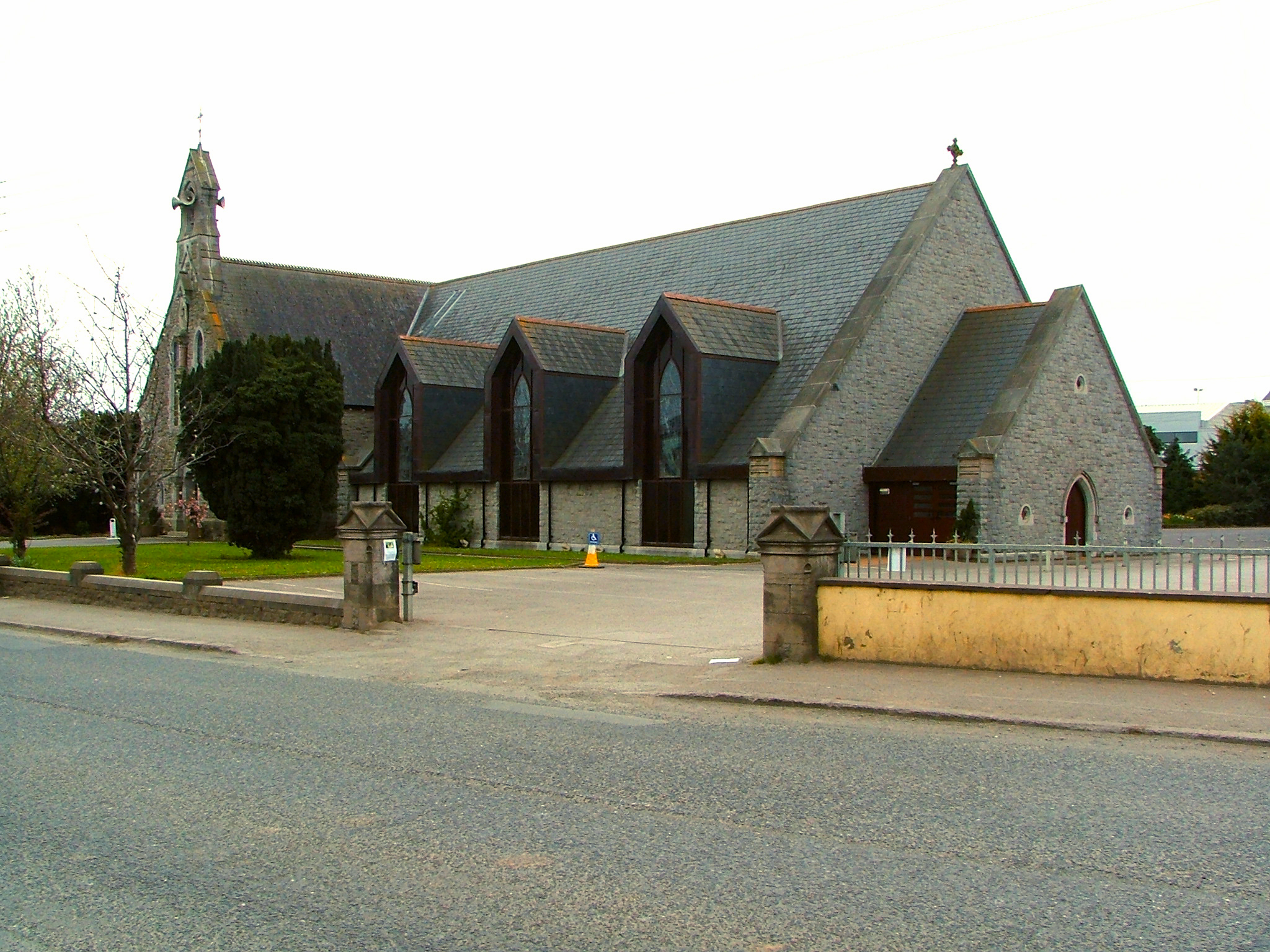
Church of the Immaculate Conception, Ashbourne.

The Roman Catholic parish of Ashbourne extends south to Newtown Commons, east to Greenoge, north to Rath and west to Harlockstown. The Church of the Immaculate Conception is located in the centre of the town. In 1982, the parish was joined to Donaghmore, which has its own church 2 km (1 mi) to the south-east of Ashbourne.

== Sport ==
There is an 18-hole golf course (founded 1991), on the outskirts of the town and several sports clubs in the town. These include a Gaelic Athletic Association club, Donaghmore Ashbourne GAA, which was originally founded as 'Donaghmore' in 1923 at the Wootton. Now based at Killeglan, it has pitches and a clubhouse, with an indoor astroturf and two full-size Gaelic pitches which opened in 2006.

The local rugby union team, Ashbourne Rugby Club, was founded in 1976. Ashbourne is also home to Longhorns Rugby League Club which was formed in 2005 and plays its home matches at Ashbourne Rugby Club. The club were All-Ireland Rugby League champions in 2017.

There are also a number of soccer teams (including Ashbourne United and Killegland AFC), a cricket club Ashbourne cricket club behind the community centre, and a judo club.

There is a community centre, opened in 1981 and upgraded in 2017, which has a sports hall with a full-size basketball court, 3 badminton courts, a squash court, a handball & racquetball court, and changing facilities and meeting rooms. The community centre is used by sporting organisations, including St Andrews Athletics Club.

The International Baseball Centre (IBC) is located in Ashbourne behind the Ashbourne District Community Centre. The IBC is Ireland's only international standard baseball diamond, and home of the Ashbourne Baseball Club. Ashbourne Baseball Club is an amateur baseball club that competes in the Irish Baseball League. It fields teams in the Little League division as well as teams in the A and B divisions of the adult league. Up until 2019, the teams competed under the name "Ashbourne Giants". Home games are played at the International Baseball Centre, an international standard baseball field located behind the Ashbourne District Community Centre.

Fairyhouse Racecourse is located 10 km from Ashbourne.

== People ==
- Nina Carberry, jockey
- Peter Dempsey, racing driver
- Johnny Logan, singer known for Eurovision successes
- Aengus Mac Grianna, RTÉ newsreader
- Daráine Mulvihill, television presenter
- Thomas Ryan, Limerick-born artist who lived and worked in Ashbourne
- Kevin Toner, association footballer

== See also ==
- List of towns and villages in Ireland
