= The Cú Chulainn Coaster =

Wooden roller coaster in Ireland

Emerald Park
- Location: Emerald Park
- Coordinates: 53.5427°N 6.4628°W
- Status: Operating
- Opening date: 6 June 2015
- Cost: €8,500,000

General statistics
- Type: Wood
- Manufacturer: The Gravity Group
- Lift/launch system: Chain lift hill
- Height: 32 m (105 ft)
- Drop: 31 m (102 ft)
- Length: 1,092 m (3,583 ft)
- Speed: 90 km/h (56 mph)
- Inversions: 0
- Duration: 2:45
- Capacity: 700 riders per hour
- Trains: 2 trains with 12 cars; riders arranged 2 across in a single row for a total of 24 riders per train
- The Cú Chulainn Coaster at RCDB

The Cú Chulainn Coaster is a wooden roller coaster located at Emerald Park in Ashbourne, County Meath, Ireland. Manufactured by The Gravity Group, the wooden coaster features an overbanked turn and opened on 6 June 2015.

== History ==
The Cú Chulainn Coaster was officially announced by Tayto Park in a press release on 19 February 2015, although construction started earlier in August 2014. Ohio-based company The Gravity Group was selected to build the roller coaster, marking their second installation in Europe following Twister at Gröna Lund in Sweden. Construction was completed in May 2015, and the roller coaster opened on 6 June 2015. It was part of a €26 million investment at Tayto Park, which also included 7 other new attractions for the 2015 season. Its theme is based on the mythological lore surrounding Irish hero Cú Chulainn, whom the ride is named after.

== Reception ==
Golden Ticket Awards: Best New Ride for 2015
Ranking	4

Golden Ticket Awards: Top wood Roller Coasters
Year									1998	1999
Ranking									–	–
Year	2000	2001	2002	2003	2004	2005	2006	2007	2008	2009
Ranking	–	–	–	–	–	–	–	–	–	–
Year	2010	2011	2012	2013	2014	2015	2016	2017	2018	2019
Ranking	–	–	–	–	–	19	22	30	27	35
Year	2020	2021	2022	2023	2024	2025	2026			
Ranking	N/A	43	33 (tie)	36	48	46 (tie)	36			
