= Leviathan (Sea World) =

Wooden roller coaster in Australia

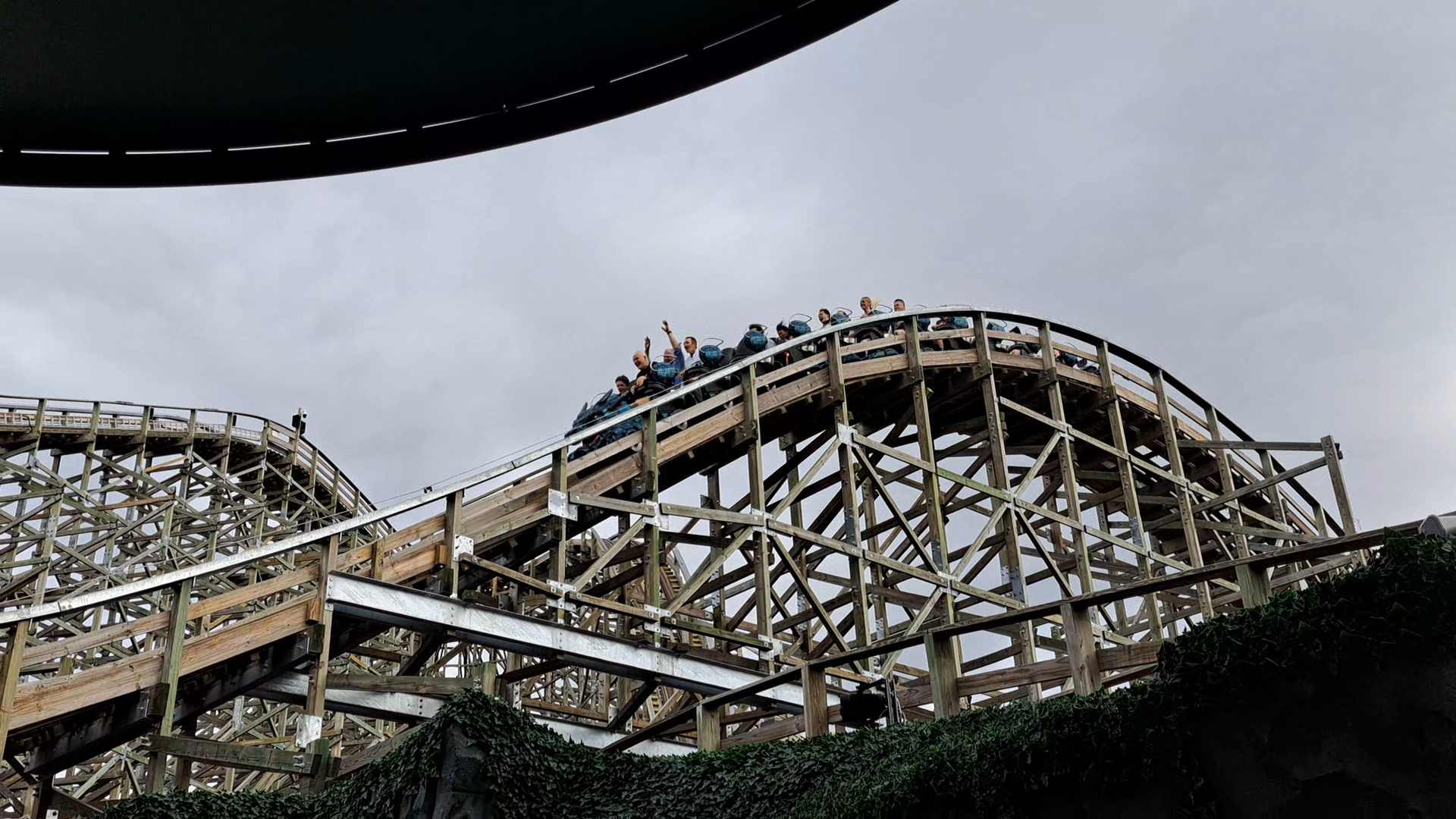

Sea World
- Location: Sea World
- Park section: The New Atlantis
- Coordinates: 27.957433°S 153.426301°E
- Status: Operating
- Opening date: 2 December 2022
- Cost: $20,000,000

General statistics
- Type: Wood
- Manufacturer: Martin & Vleminckx
- Designer: The Gravity Group
- Track layout: Twister
- Lift/launch system: Chain lift hill
- Height: 32 m (105 ft)
- Length: 1,000.0 m (3,280.8 ft)
- Speed: 80.0 km/h (49.7 mph)
- Inversions: 0
- Duration: 1:30
- Capacity: 720 riders per hour
- Trains: 2 trains with 12 cars. Riders are arranged 2 across in a single row for a total of 24 riders per train.
- Website: Official website
- Leviathan at RCDB

Leviathan is a wooden roller coaster at Sea World on the Gold Coast, Queensland, Australia. It is a part of the park's New Atlantis Expansion, and the first new wooden coaster built in Australia in 35 years. Leviathan opened on 2 December 2022.

== History ==
In late May 2019, Sea World announced the addition of a $50,000,000 mega project area – The New Atlantis – which would feature three new rides scheduled to open from December 2019 and onwards. Alongside the Vortex top spin and the Trident (star flyer) was the Leviathan wooden roller coaster, which was set to be Australia's first new wooden coaster since Bush Beast at Wonderland Sydney in 1985. Leviathan would include backwards facing seats and claim multiple Australian wooden coaster records. The investment was made with the intention of rejuvenating the neglected Sea World after dwindling attendance and a hit to the domestic theme park industry following the 2016 Thunder River Rapids Ride incident at Dreamworld, which killed four people. In addition, the announcement coincided with that of the Queensland Government's $60,000,000 Spit Masterplan on the Gold Coast.

Leviathan was originally slated to open in December 2020, and managed to keep its timeline when the Trident was pushed back to 2021, with park COO Bikash Randhawa confirming that Leviathan was being prioritized. However, the economic fallout from the COVID-19 pandemic resulted in Leviathan's timeline being pushed back, ultimately opening on 2 December 2022.

The concrete slab for the coaster's foundations was completed by July 2020, and the coaster went vertical soon after. On 1 December 2020, the ride's train design and further concept artwork were revealed. A few days later, the highest point of the ride was topped off. Vertical construction began wrapping up in April 2021, and the coaster was set to open on 18 September 2021; however, the opening date was once again pushed to late 2021. Later in the year, this date was again pushed to April 2022, and once again pushed to September 2022 with Leviathan officially opening on 2 December 2022.

On 4 August 2022, the official Sea World Facebook page posted a video of the Leviathan on its first test run, showing the train navigating the track. Sea World also announced on this post that the team has begun official ride testing with the ride's manufacturer and confirmed that Leviathan would open in late 2022. Currently, the release date is scheduled at 2 December 2022, alongside the Trident.

During late October and early November of 2022, Sea World's social media pages begun to reveal behind the scenes footage of the progress of the coaster. This includes the design reveal of the 24-passenger Timberliner train, revealing the theming of the queue and station and footage of the three modeled Atlantic themed statues that have since been situated within the precinct for theming. These seven consecutive uploads by the park followed a final reveal of the release date of the Leviathan, and an accompanying advertisement.

== Characteristics ==
=== Statistics ===
According to the manufacturer, Leviathan is 105 feet (32 m) tall, 3,280.8 feet (1,000.0 m) long, and will reach a top speed of 49.7 mph (80.0 km/h). The track crosses over and under itself multiple times, and features various airtime hills. The coaster is serviced by a 155-metre (509 ft) chain to pull either of the two 24-passenger trains up to the ride's peak, and the last row of each train will face backwards, as you can pay money to ride on the back, marking a wooden coaster first.

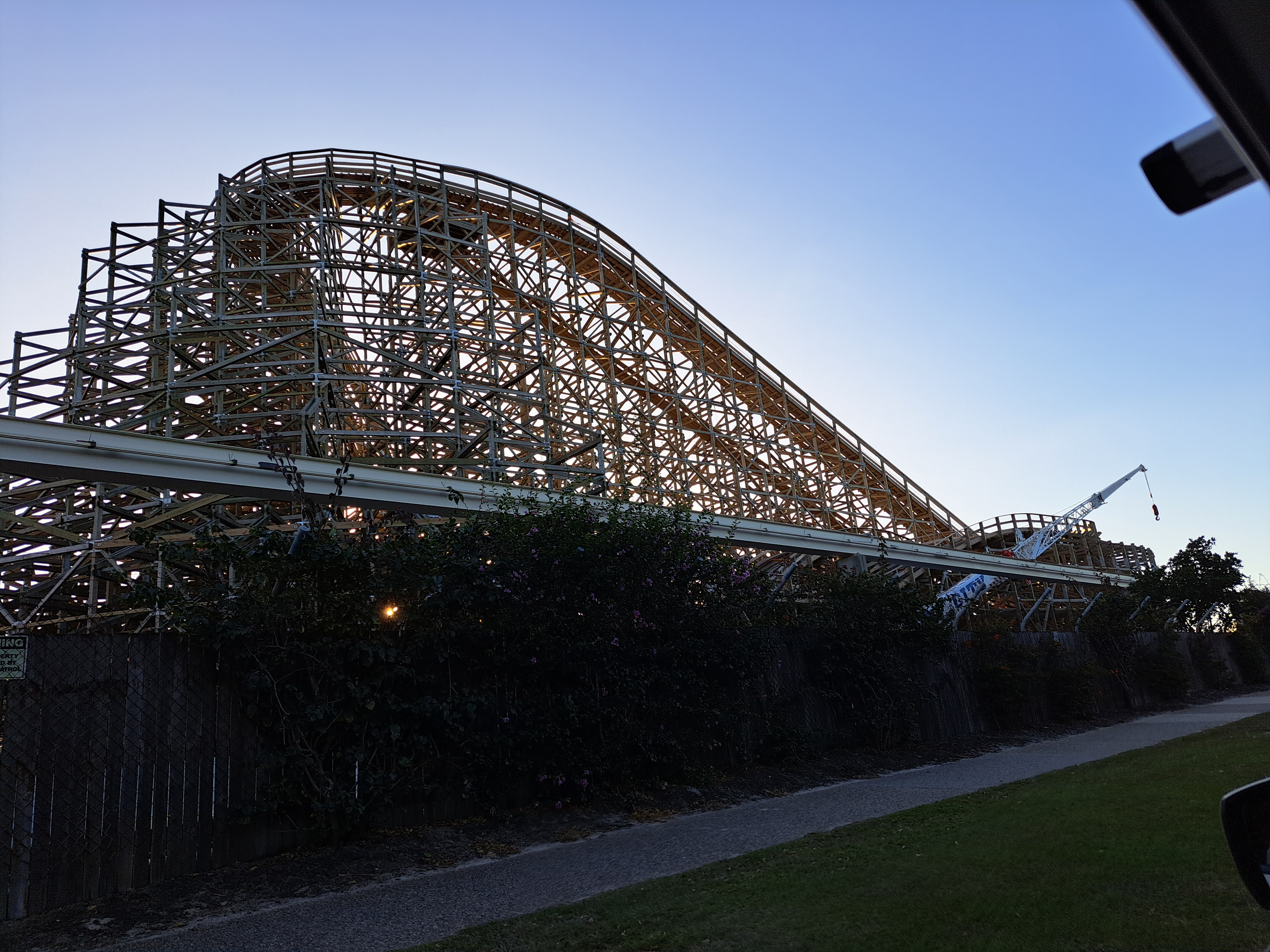
Construction progress in mid 2022

=== Construction ===
Leviathan is primarily constructed from Southern Yellow Pine imported from the United States. The coaster's structure is composed of the following;

- 500,000 nails
- 98,250 bolts
- 6,000 support anchors
- 1,884 cubic metres (m^{3}) of Concrete
- 183,000 linear meters of lumber
- 660 timber frames

=== Contractors ===
Leviathan is being manufactured by Canadian manufacturer Martin & Vleminckx, who has worked on the construction of several wooden coasters in the United States and China. It was designed by Cincinnati-based firm The Gravity Group, and its trains were manufactured by a subsidiary of the company, Gravitykraft Corporation. The ride theming was designed by Australian theming company Earthstory.
