= Lake Quassapaug =

Lake in Connecticut

- Location within Connecticut
- Location: New Haven County, Connecticut, U.S.
- Coordinates: 41.534°N 73.151°W
- Type: Reservoir
- Basin countries: United States
- Surface area: 296 acres (120 ha)
- Surface elevation: 696 ft (212 m)

Lake Quassapaug is a 296-acre (120 ha) lake located in Middlebury, Connecticut. It is home to Quassy Amusement Park.

The lake also hosts six private outing clubs, including the Lake Quassapaug Outing Club and the Quassapaug Sailing Center.

The Lake Quassapaug Association (LQA) manages the reservation of the lake and is composed of interested individuals, groups, and property owners on the lakefront. The LQA was formed in 2012 to preserve the lake’s high water quality and promote responsible enjoyment of the lake.
