= ZDT's Amusement Park =

Amusement park in Seguin, Texas

- Previously known as ZDT's Amusement Center
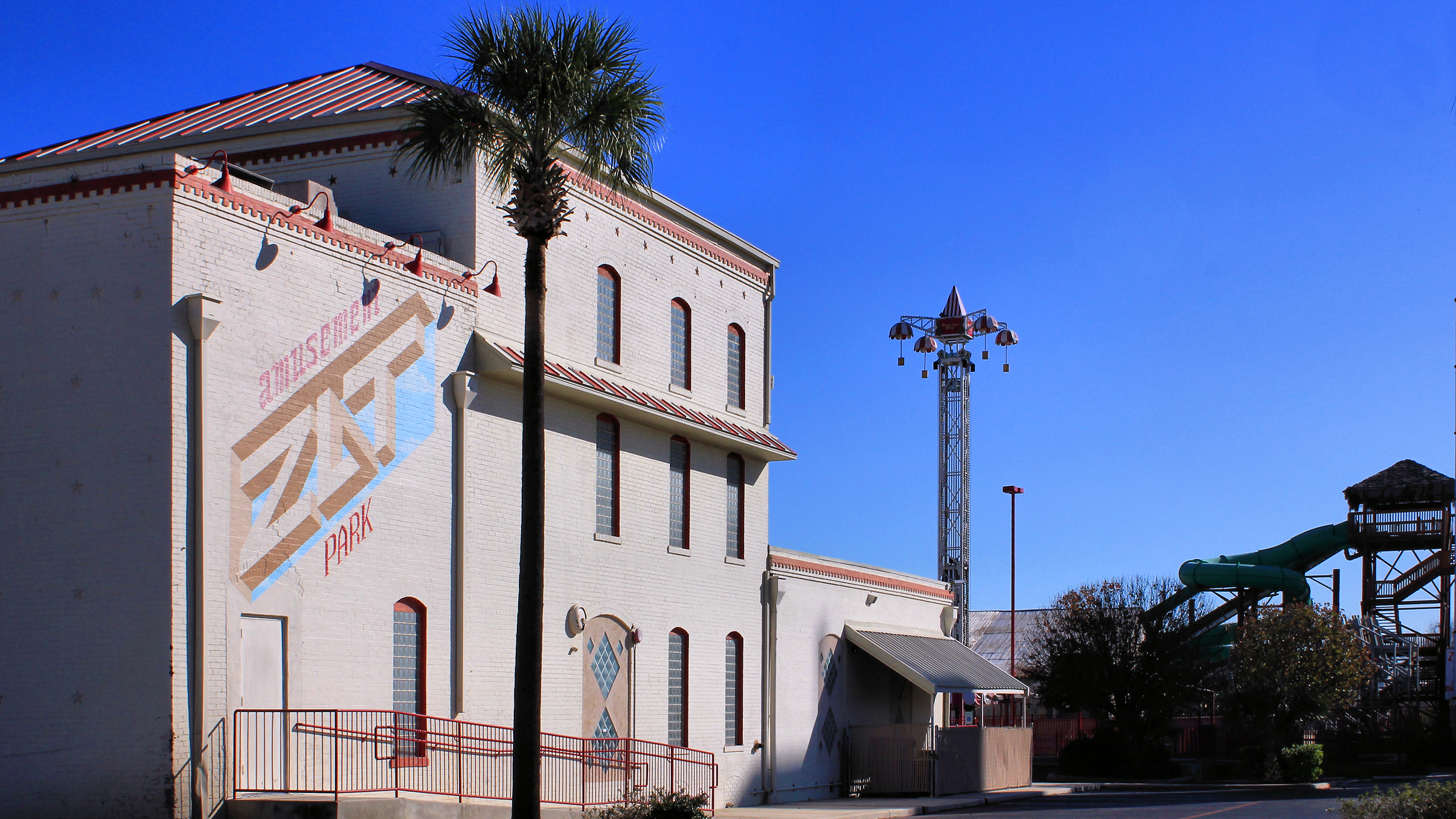
- Interactive map of ZDT's Amusement Park
- Location: Seguin, Texas, United States
- Coordinates: 29°34′48″N 97°58′1.2″W
- Status: Defunct
- Opened: March 2007
- Closed: August 17, 2025
- Owner: Danny Donhauser
- Operating season: All year
- Area: 10 acres (4.0 ha)

Attractions
- Total: 13
- Roller coasters: 1
- Water rides: 3
- Website: www.zdtamusement.com

ZDT's Amusement Park was a 10-acre (4.0 ha) family amusement park located in Seguin, Texas. The park opened in 2007 and featured 12 attractions, three of which were water rides, along with an arcade. It was open year-round, with the exception of its water rides, which operated from March through September. The park introduced its first roller coaster, Switchback, in 2015. The park permanently closed on August 17, 2025 due to rising operational costs.

== History ==
In March 2007, ZDT's Amusement Park first opened its doors to the public and featured five indoor attractions. Owners Danny and Sarah Donhauser named the park after their three children – Zac, Danielle, and Tiffany – using the first letter of each child's name. Multi-level go-karts were added in 2008, and Mad Raft Water Coaster, a water coaster and the park's first water ride, opened in 2011. The Switchback roller coaster was added in 2015.

The park ceased operations on August 17, 2025 due to rising costs.

== Rides and attractions ==
Switchback
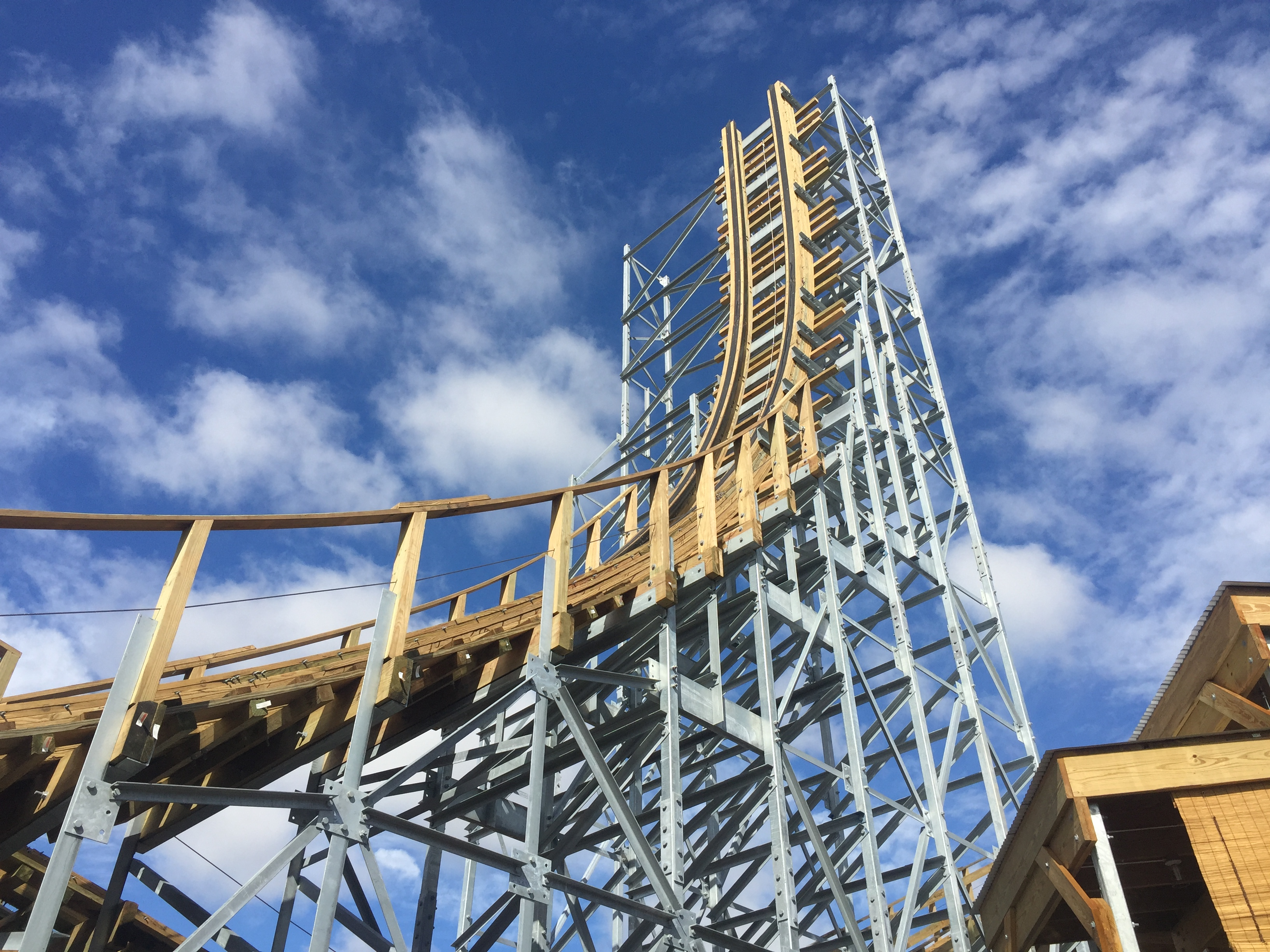

ZDT's Amusement Park
- Location: ZDT's Amusement Park
- Coordinates: 29.5802°N 97.9663°W
- Status: Closed
- Opening date: October 17, 2015
- Closing date: August 17, 2025

General statistics
- Type: Wood
- Manufacturer: The Gravity Group
- Lift/launch system: Chain lift hill
- Height: 65 ft (20 m)
- Drop: 58 ft (18 m)
- Speed: 65 km/h (40 mph)
- Inversions: 0
- Max vertical angle: 87°
- Capacity: 700 riders per hour
- Trains: 2 trains with 4 cars; riders arranged 2 across in a single row for a total of 8 riders per train
- Switchback at RCDB

Video

=== Switchback ===
In late 2014, ZDT's unveiled plans to build Switchback, a custom hybrid wooden shuttle roller coaster that featured a 104-degree overbanked turn and an 87-degree incline (a world record in wooden coaster angles of descent). Manufactured by The Gravity Group, the 63-foot-tall (19 m) ride dropped riders 58 feet (18 m) and reached speeds of up to 40 mph (64 km/h). The roller coaster opened to the public on October 17, 2015. It navigated through and around various buildings and structures in the park before reaching a culminating element called the "Grand Spike", which sent riders up an 87-degree incline. Switchback was the first and only wooden shuttle coaster of its kind, and derived its name from the 1884 Switchback Railway, the first true roller coaster in United States. On August 16, 2026, park owners Danny and Sarah Donhauser announced Switchback had been sold to an undisclosed park. It was later revealed that the ride had been sold to IB Parks & Entertainment, and would reopen at one of their two parks in 2028.

Golden Ticket Awards: Best New Ride for 2016
Ranking	5

Golden Ticket Awards: Top wood Roller Coasters
Year									1998	1999
Ranking									–	–
Year	2000	2001	2002	2003	2004	2005	2006	2007	2008	2009
Ranking	–	–	–	–	–	–	–	–	–	–
Year	2010	2011	2012	2013	2014	2015	2016	2017	2018	2019
Ranking	–	–	–	–	–	–	–	33	36	49
Year	2020	2021	2022	2023	2024	2025	2026			
Ranking	N/A	–	46	–	–	46 (tie)	–			

=== Thrill rides ===
Name	Manufacturer	Type
Dizzy Toucan	Zamperla	Mini Discovery
Maxflight Simulator	Max Flight	N/A
Parachute Drop	Zamperla	N/A
ThunderVolt Speedway GoKarts	N/A	Go-karts

=== Water rides ===
Name	Manufacturer	Type
Mad Raft	N/A	Water coaster
Viper	N/A	Launched water slide
Viper's Tail	N/A	Mat racing water slide

=== Other attractions ===
Name	Manufacturer	Type	Notes
Jungle Playground	N/A	Playground	
Rock Wall	N/A	Climbing rockwall	
Silo Climb	N/A	Climbing area	Closed in 2023
Trampoline Thing	N/A	Trampoline	
