= Ravine Flyer II =

Wooden roller coaster at Waldameer & Water World

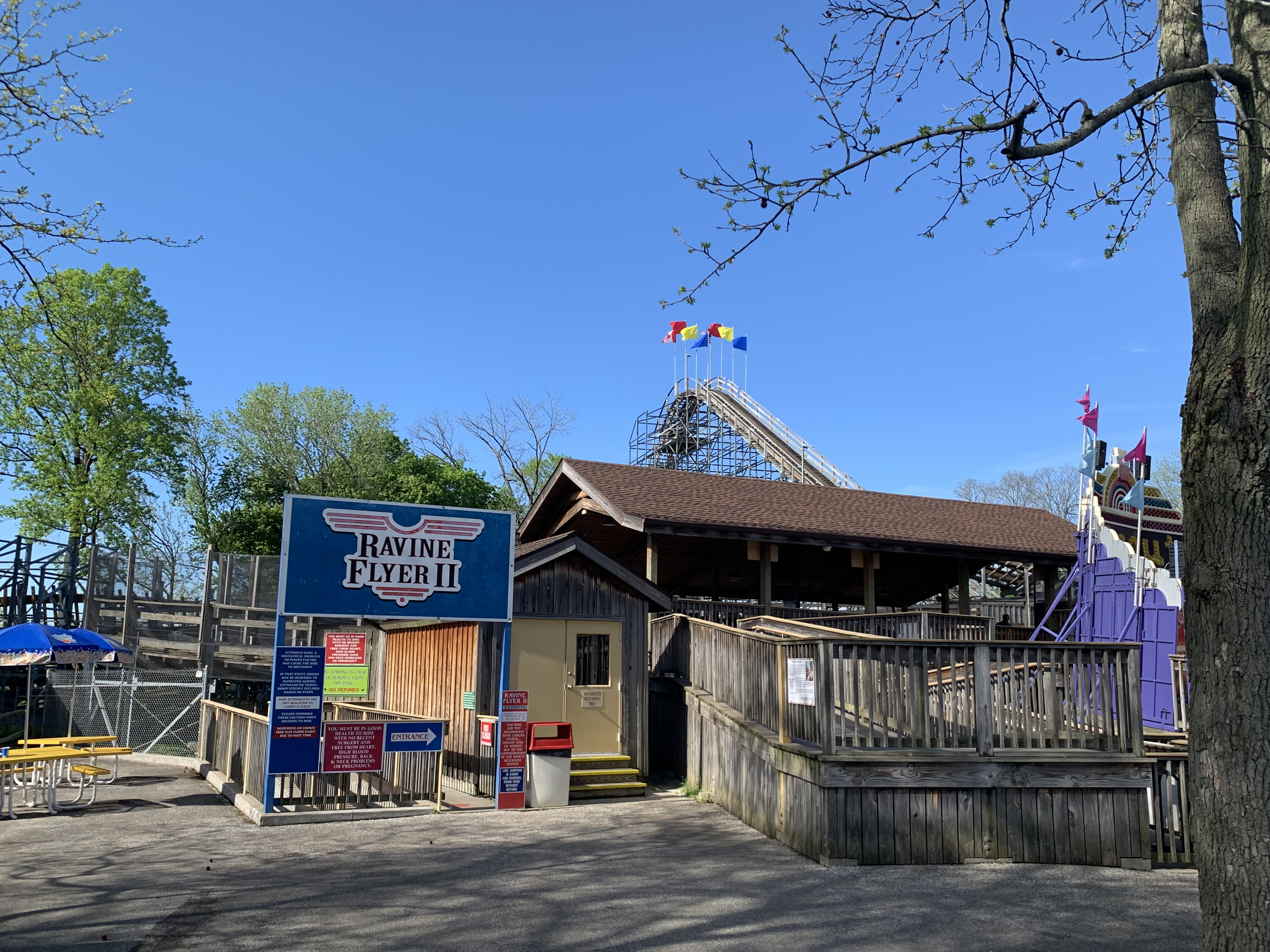
- From left to right: the ride's entrance, station, and lift hill in 2022

Waldameer & Water World
- Location: Waldameer & Water World
- Coordinates: 42.109256°N 80.157041°W
- Status: Operating
- Opening date: May 17, 2008
- Cost: $6 million (equivalent to $8.97 million in 2025)
- Replaced: Ravine Flyer

General statistics
- Type: Wood
- Manufacturer: The Gravity Group
- Designer: The Gravity Group
- Track layout: Terrain
- Lift/launch system: Chain lift hill
- Height: 85 ft (26 m)
- Drop: 120 ft (37 m)
- Length: 3,061 ft (933 m)
- Speed: 60 mph (97 km/h)
- Duration: 1:30
- Max vertical angle: 60°
- G-force: 3.5
- Restraint style: Lap bars and seatbelts
- Height restriction: 48 in (122 cm)
- Trains: 2 trains with 6 cars; riders arranged 2 across in 2 rows for a total of 24 riders per train
- Ravine Flyer II at RCDB

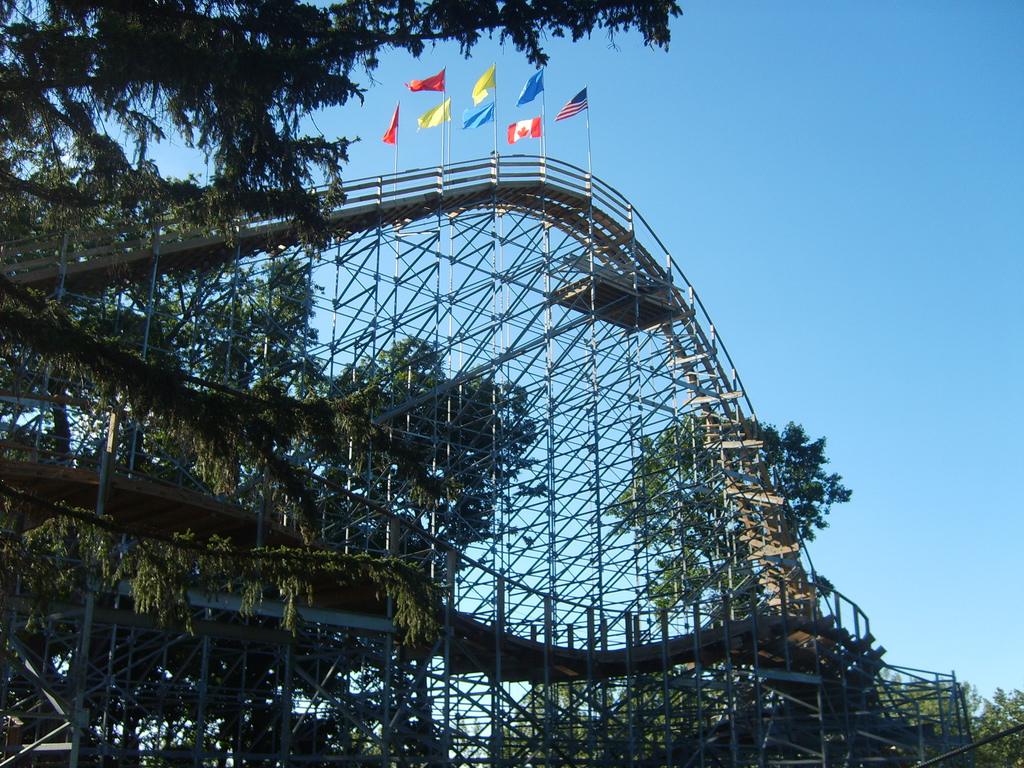
Lift hill and final airtime hills in 2008

Ravine Flyer II is a hybrid wooden roller coaster located at Waldameer & Water World in Erie, Pennsylvania, United States. It opened in 2008, and was ranked as the Best New Ride of 2008 by the Amusement Today magazine.

Ravine Flyer II was named for and built on the site of the park's former Ravine Flyer roller coaster, which was dismantled in 1938 after a man died on it in an incident. Initial concepts for the replacement ride were developed by Charles Dinn and Custom Coasters International (CCI) in the early 1990s, further developed by Dennis McNulty several years later, then finalized and constructed by The Gravity Group, with Jeff Mason overseeing construction.

The roller coaster crosses overtop of Pennsylvania Route 832 (PA 832, known locally as Peninsula Drive) twice along its course, emulating the course of the original Ravine Flyer.

== History ==
In the years following the closure of the first Ravine Flyer, park owner Paul Nelson expressed a desire to build a second iteration of the ride in the same location. For several decades, it remained only a concept.

In 1993, the park placed the first deposit for the ride with Custom Coasters International, and concept art for the ride surfaced in 1994. The ride would be named Ravine Flyer II, after a defunct coaster that operated on the same plot of land from 1922 to 1938. Steve Gorman, general manager of Waldameer, announced in 1997 that the park would build a wooden roller coaster in the northern portion of the park. At the time of announcement, the ride was planned to be completed in 2000 at a cost of $3.5 million. It would cross over Pennsylvania Route 832, the main entrance to the nearby Presque Isle State Park. Waldameer had previously granted the state of Pennsylvania an easement for 120 feet (37 m), allowing the state to build PA 832 beneath the first Ravine Flyer. The easement stated that the park had the right to build a roller coaster over the road.

In September 1998, it was announced that CCI had been hired to design the ride, whose debut had been pushed back to 2001. The ride was planned to be 3,000 feet (910 m) long, with a 65-foot-tall (20 m) lift hill and 110 feet (34 m) first drop.

By mid-2001, the ride's construction had been delayed due to several lawsuits. Brian and Antoinette Candela, who lived near the proposed coaster, claimed that the ride violated a Pennsylvania state law because it was within a "bluff recession hazard area". Brian Candela subsequently accused park owner Paul Nelson of bragging about his political connections, which Nelson had claimed would permit the ride's construction. Pennsylvania Department of Transportation (PennDOT) was also involved, citing concerns about a roller coaster being built over a public road, as by this point, Peninsula Drive had expanded into a busy four-lane highway. The park had to present paperwork dating back to the 1920s regarding the construction of PA 832 beneath the first Ravine Flyer in order to be allowed to build the second. Additionally, local government planned to build a greenway and visitor center near where the ride's out-of-park turnaround would be located. Amid all the delays, CCI went bankrupt and ceased operations in 2002.

Local officials granted a zoning variance to Waldameer in April 2004, allowing the park to build the ride above PA 832. By then, its cost had increased to $6 million, making it the most expensive ride in Waldameer's history until the $15 million addition of Eagle's Pursuit in 2027. Its expected height and length had increased by this point as well, bringing it to 120 feet (37 m) tall and 3,061 feet (933 m) long. The last of the ride's opponents relented after a court ruled in Waldameer's favor in January 2006. Additionally, PennDOT imposed strict regulations regarding the ride's highway bridge, requiring it to be enclosed completely and painted the color of the sky to avoid injuring or distracting drivers below. The bridge also had to be wide enough to allow for theoretical future sidewalks or bike paths installed alongside PA 832.

Meanwhile, The Gravity Group was hired to construct the ride following CCI's bankruptcy. Construction on the coaster began in 2006, and continued into 2007. Ravine Flyer II opened on May 17, 2008, 11 years after its first public announcement and 70 years after the closure of the first Ravine Flyer. Waldameer held an auction to select the first 24 riders, and donated a large portion of proceeds from the auction and tickets sold on the ride's opening day to the Juvenile Diabetes Research Foundation International. One of the first 24 riders was a 93-year-old woman who rode the first Ravine Flyer in her youth.

In October 2012, Hurricane Sandy impacted Erie and its strong winds caused a tree next to the lift hill to fall onto the ride on a section of track that had just been freshly rebuilt. The ride was repaired and opened alongside the rest of the park for the opening weekend of the 2013 season, missing no operational time. In 2024, it received an on-ride photo camera. It has been subject to extensive retracking each off-season, such that no original track from its opening year remains in place on the ride as of the 2026 season.

== Ride experience ==
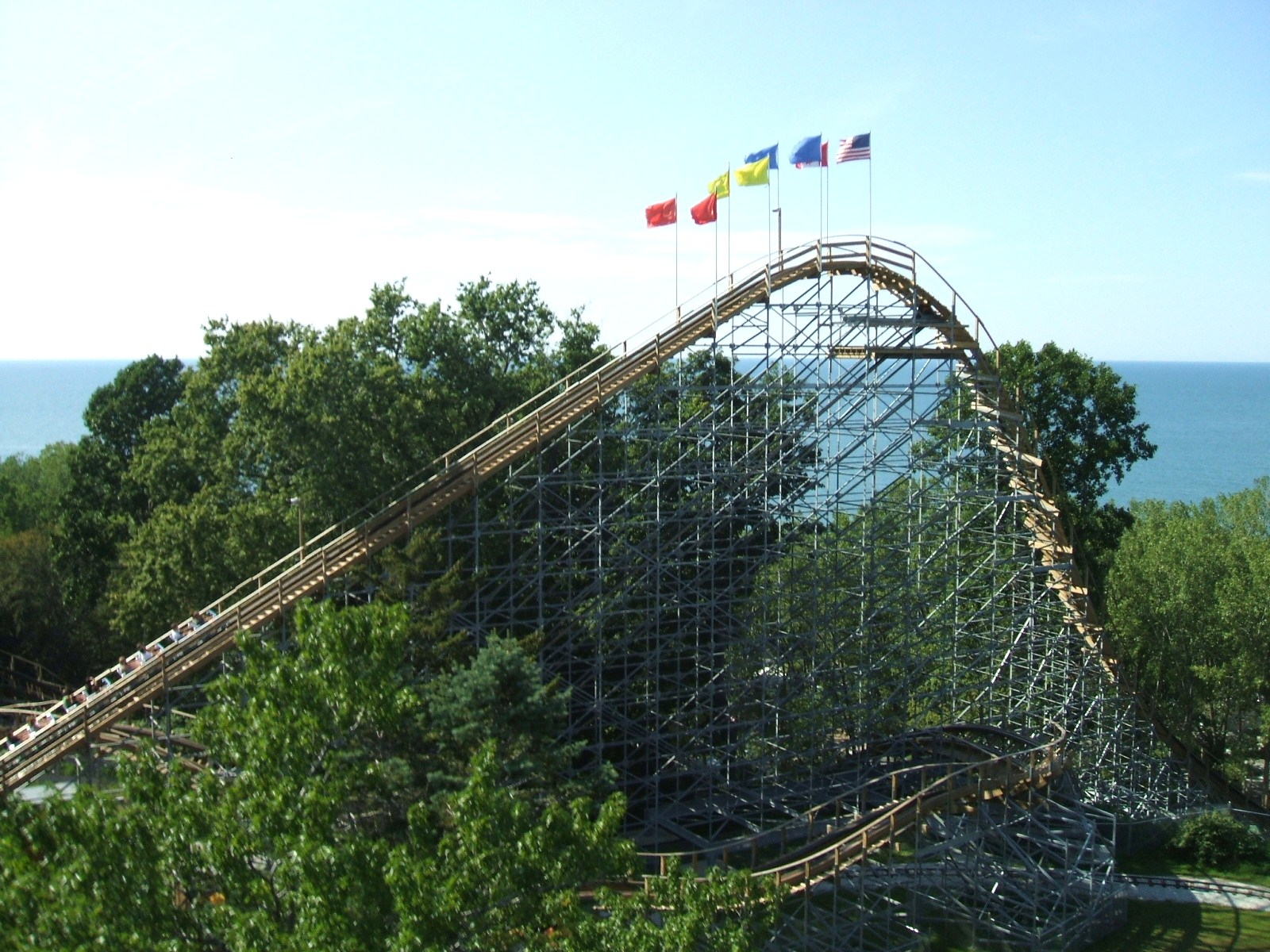
Lift hill in 2008 with Lake Erie in the background

Upon dispatch from the station, the train enters a short drop and lefthand turn to the chain lift hill. After climbing the 85 foot (26 m) lift hill facing Lake Erie, the train immediately descends the 120 foot (37 m), 60° first drop while turning sharply to the right through a tunnel, and travels over a 165 foot (50 m) long airtime hill as it crosses above PA 832 in an enclosed bridge. The track banks to the left, then right, while ascending the turnaround to the top of the second major drop. The train descends this 105 foot (32 m) drop into the second crossing of PA 832 over another airtime hill in the bridge. This is immediately followed by a pair of tunnels enclosing two airtime hills, and an ascending turn to the left. The track travels over an airtime hill above the lift hill, making a slight descending 180° lefthand turn before traveling under the lift hill, where an on-ride photo is taken. It then traverses another airtime hill before entering a 90° banked right turn and 60 foot (18 m) drop into the ravine. The track continues turning to the right, rising up out of the ravine and through the lift hill in another right-turning airtime hill. It traverses two final airtime hills and makes a righthand turn before entering the brake run and turning 180° left to return to the station.

== Characteristics ==
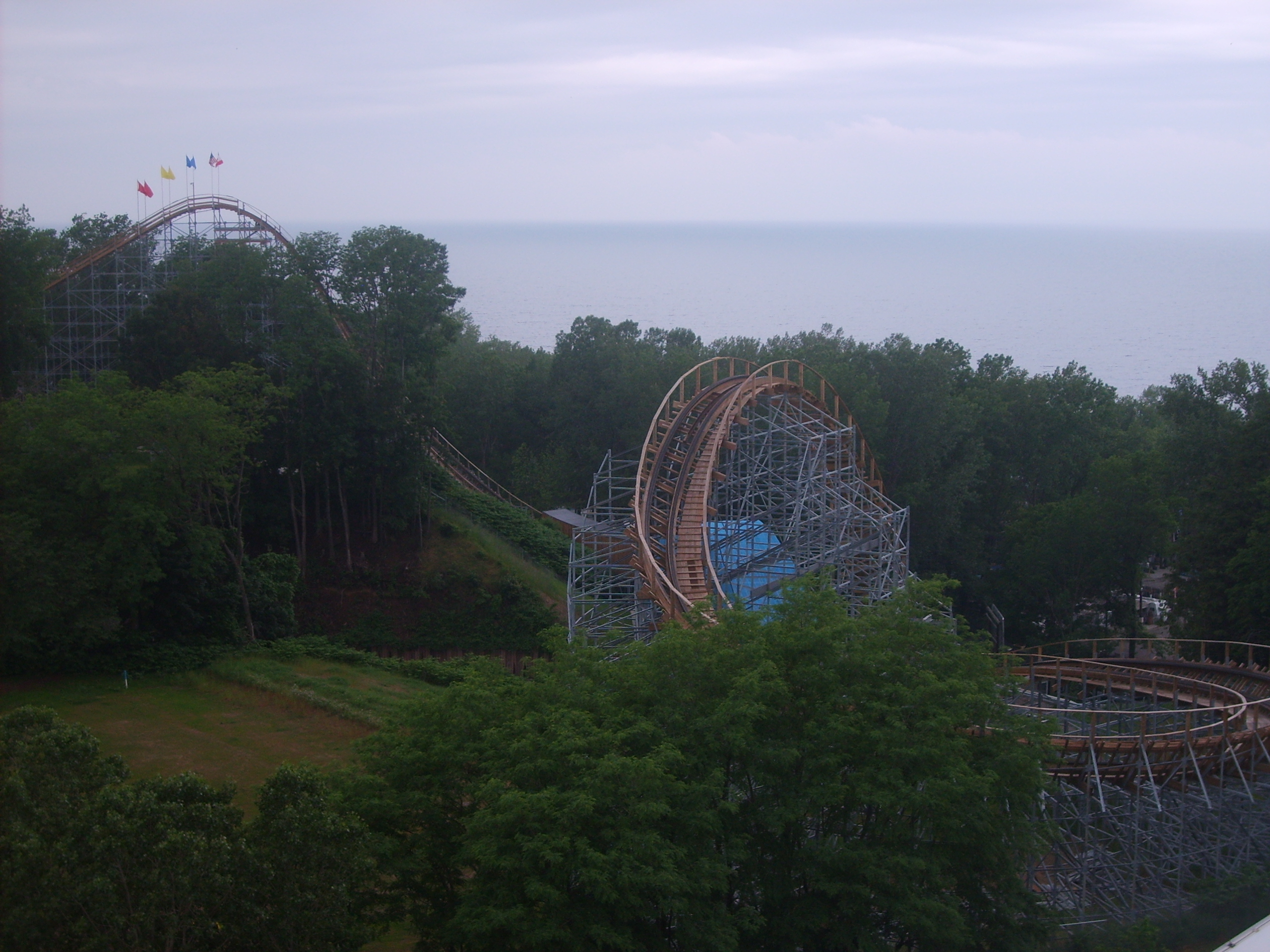
Lift hill and turnaround in 2008 as seen from the nearby Tom Ridge Environmental Center's observation tower

Each day before the park opens, a Waldameer mechanic spends two hours inspecting Ravine Flyer II. It has approximately 300,000 riders a year. The ride's slogan is "Dare, fly, earn your wings!" It was built from Douglas fir timber.

=== Ride ===
Ravine Flyer II was designed by The Gravity Group and is a hybrid coaster, with wooden track and a steel support frame. The layout contains ten airtime moments, as well as three drops measuring 120 feet (37 m), 105 feet (32 m), and 60 feet (18 m). The first drop reaches a maximum vertical angle of 60°, and track in other parts of the ride features banking up to 90°. The ride is cited as being 3,061 feet (933 m) long and running at top speeds of 60 miles per hour (97 km/h). One ride cycle lasts approximately one minute and 30 seconds. It traverses PA 832 twice on an arch bridge measuring 165 feet (50 m) long, making it the only ride in the world to cross over a four-lane highway. It is the tallest and fastest wooden coaster in Pennsylvania, and it possesses the longest and steepest drop on any wooden coaster in the state as well.

=== Trains ===
Ravine Flyer II's trains were built by Philadelphia Toboggan Coasters. The ride has two trains. One train is painted red, the other is painted blue, and both feature the ride's logo on the lead cars. Each train has six cars, all of which carry four passengers in two rows of two, for a total of 24 riders per train. Riders are secured by individual seatbelts and ratcheting lap bars, and separated by a seat divider.

== Awards ==
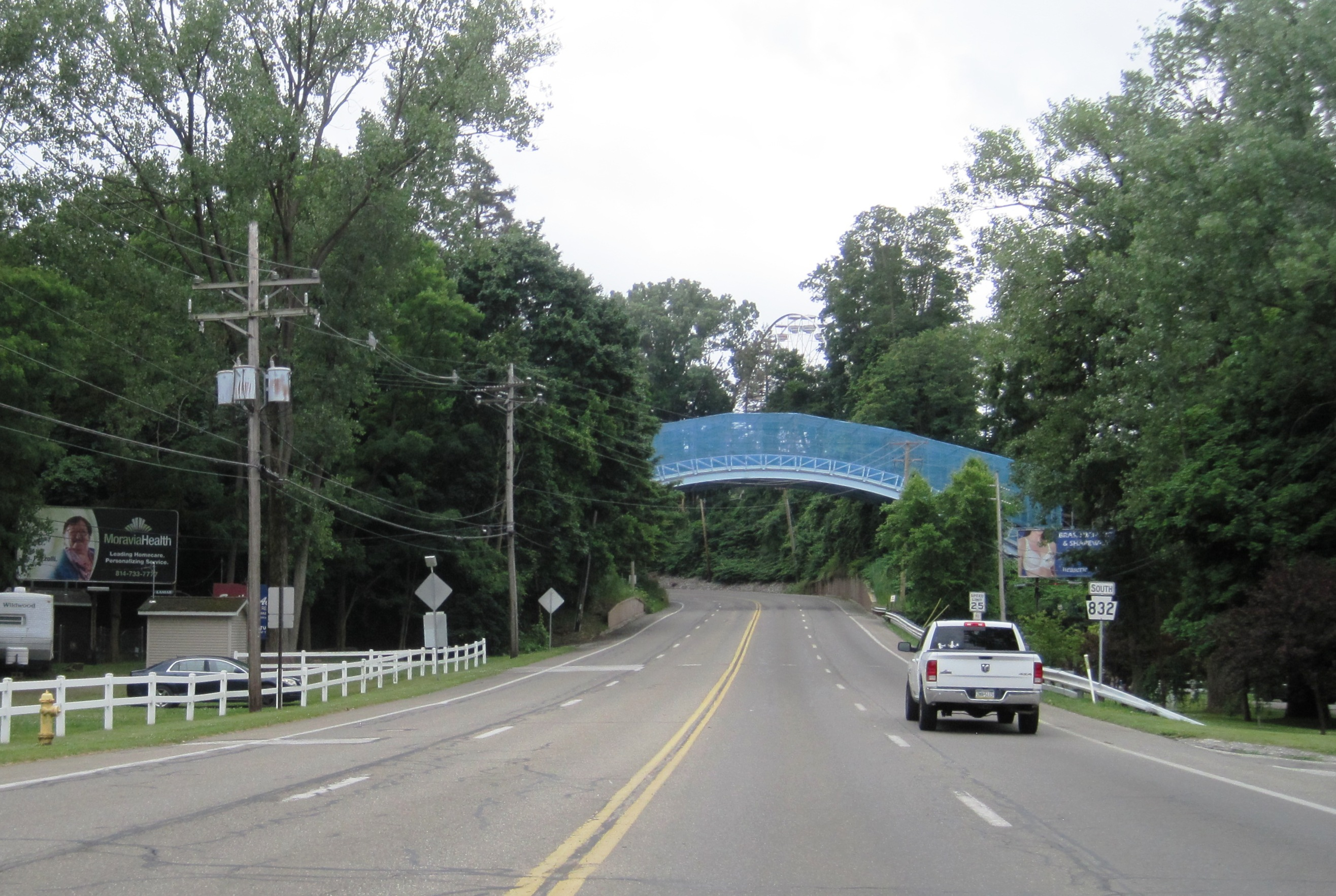
Northern side of the highway bridge in 2024 as seen from PA 832

Ravine Flyer II won Best New Ride of 2008 in Amusement Today magazine's 2008 Golden Ticket Awards with 52% of the votes. It was voted the 11th best wooden roller coaster in the world at the same awards. It has remained in the top ten best wooden coasters every year since 2009, peaking at number five in 2016. In 2025, Ravine Flyer II was awarded the title of second-best wooden coaster and fourth-best coaster overall in the United States by USA Today newspaper's 10 Best Awards. In 2026, it was awarded the title of second-best wooden coaster and fifth-best coaster overall in the United States by the USA Today 10 Best Awards.

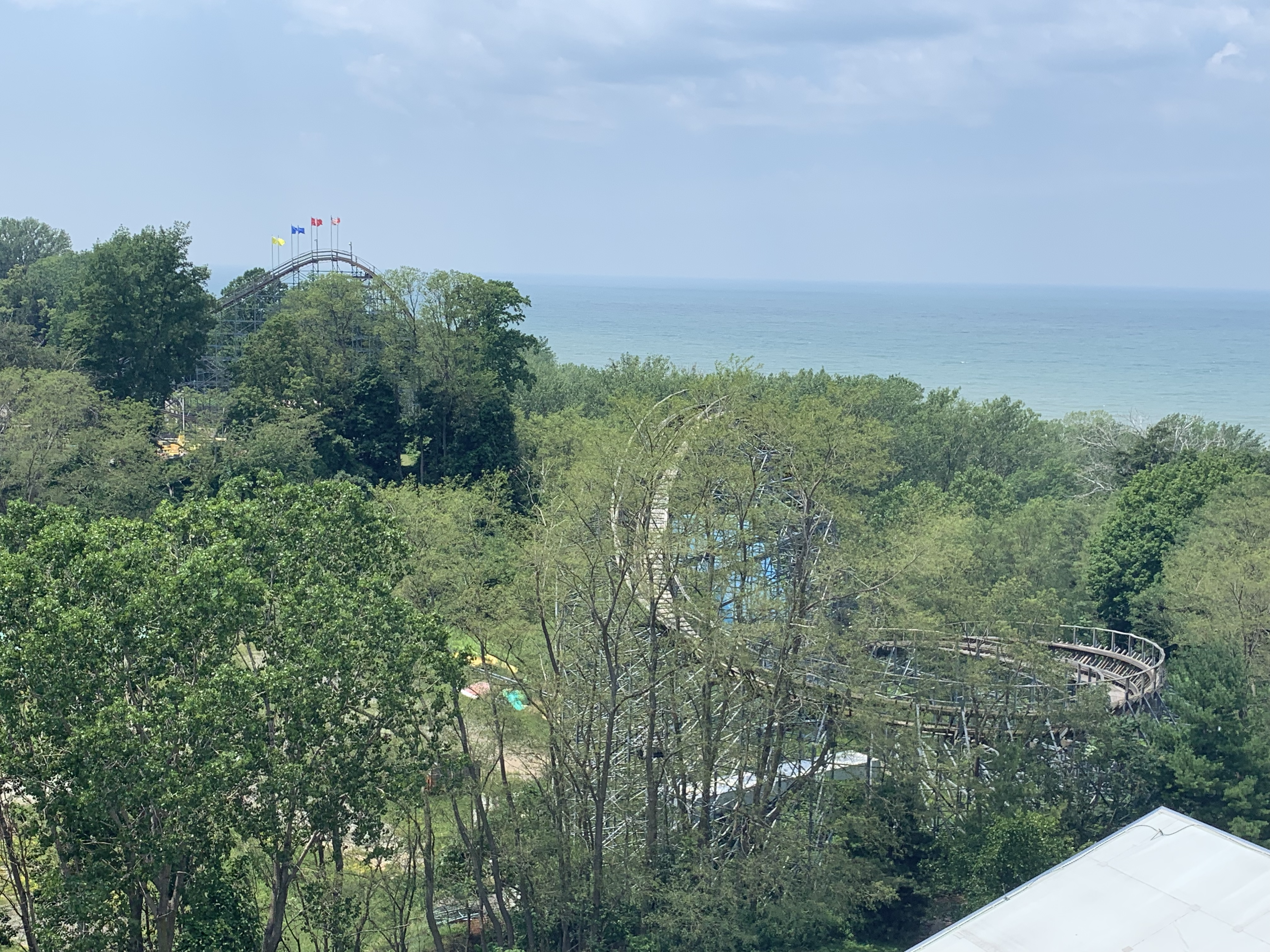
Lift hill and turnaround in 2021

Golden Ticket Awards: Top wood Roller Coasters
Year									1998	1999
Ranking									–	–
Year	2000	2001	2002	2003	2004	2005	2006	2007	2008	2009
Ranking	–	–	–	–	–	–	–	–	11	6
Year	2010	2011	2012	2013	2014	2015	2016	2017	2018	2019
Ranking	6	6	6	6	6	7	5	7	8	9
Year	2020	2021	2022	2023	2024	2025	2026			
Ranking	N/A	8	7	8	10	9	8			
