= Steel dragon (disambiguation) =

Steel dragon or Steel Dragon can refer to:

- Steel Dragon 2000, a roller coaster at Nagashima Spa Land in Nagashima, Japan
- Steel Dragon (Waldameer), a spinning roller coaster at Waldameer & Water World in Erie, Pennsylvania
- Steel Dragon, a fictitious heavy metal rock band central to the plot of the 2001 film Rock Star featuring Mark Wahlberg and Jennifer Aniston
- Steel dragon, the fictional race of dragons in the Dungeons & Dragons World of Greyhawk campaign setting
- Superior Defender Gundam Force, where Steel Dragon was the name of a fictional dragon in this animated television show
- 82nd Field Artillery Regiment (United States), where a regiment of the U.S. Army was stationed in Camp Steel Dragon in Iraq in 2004
- Steel dragon, a monster in the MMORPG RuneScape
- Steel Dragon EX, a video game that includes Shienryu and Shienryu Explosion
