= Comet (Waldameer) =

Wooden roller coaster at Waldameer & Water World

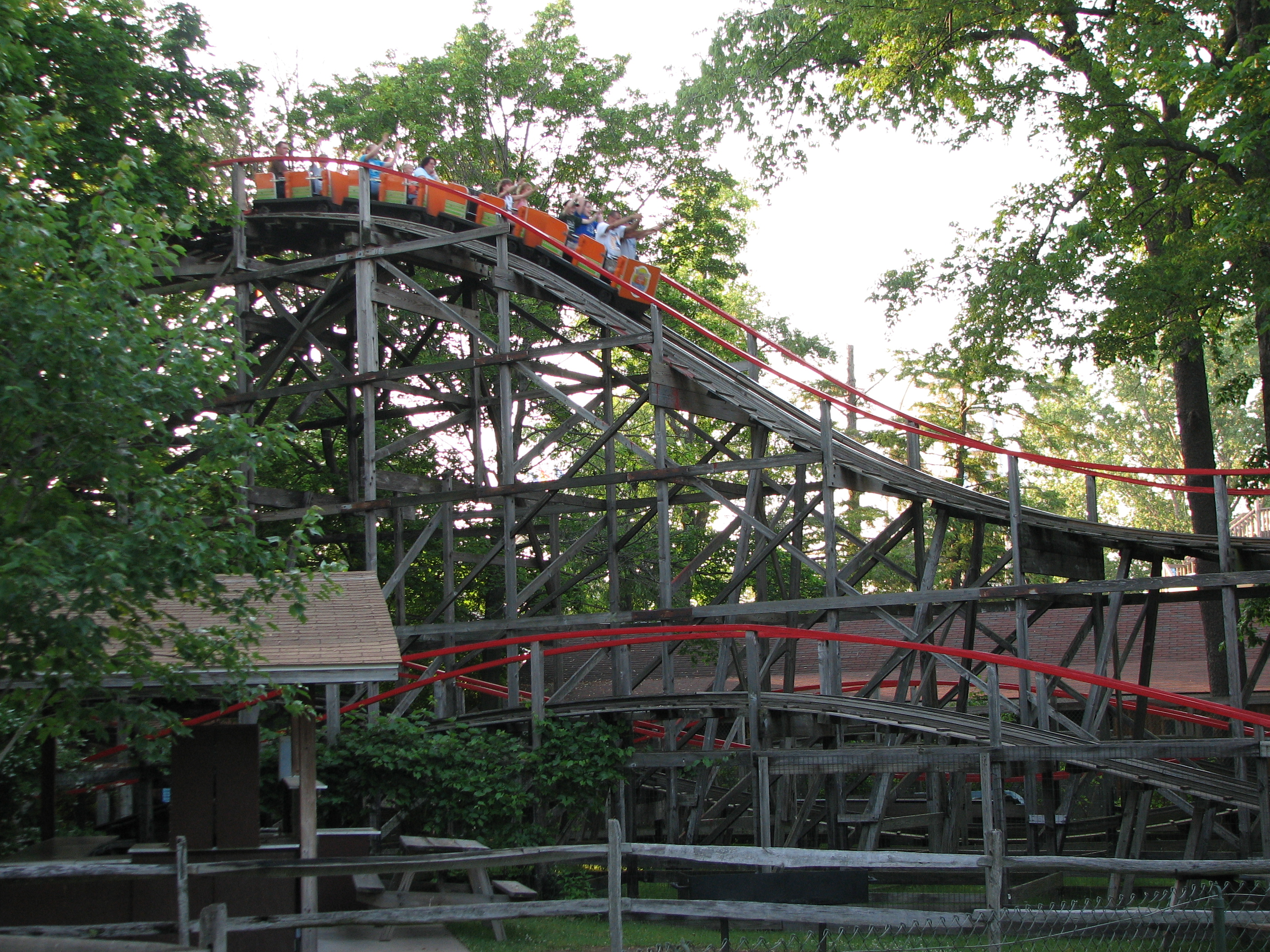

Waldameer & Water World
- Location: Waldameer & Water World
- Coordinates: 42.1077°N 80.1568°W
- Status: Operating
- Opening date: 1951

General statistics
- Type: Wood
- Manufacturer: Philadelphia Toboggan Coasters
- Designer: Herbert Paul Schmeck
- Track layout: Wood
- Lift/launch system: Chain lift hill
- Height: 37 ft (11 m)
- Drop: 25 ft (7.6 m)
- Length: 1,300 ft (400 m)
- Speed: 25 mph (40 km/h)
- Duration: 1:24
- Restraint style: Buzz bars
- Height restriction: 46 in (117 cm)
- Trains: 2 trains with 4 cars; riders arranged 2 across in 2 rows for a total of 16 riders per train
- Comet at RCDB

Comet is a wooden roller coaster located at Waldameer & Water World in Erie, Pennsylvania. It was designed by Herbert Schmeck and built by Philadelphia Toboggan Coasters (PTC) in 1951. It is similar to other Schmeck-designed PTC junior wooden coasters which feature a layered figure-eight oval layout. However, Comet is taller than those of its type which came before it.

Comet was designated an ACE Coaster Classic by American Coaster Enthusiasts for maintaining its classic standards of operation.

== History ==
The park began planning the coaster in 1946, and two rides at the park were sold to finance its addition: a Caterpillar, and a dark ride known as Fun in the Dark. The ride's construction was overseen by James Martz. It was built from Pacific coast timber. The ride's name was coined by Bobby Benson, a radio show host, at an event in the park on June 27, 1951. The ride was also nicknamed the "Bobby Benson Stratocruiser" for the day.

For the 2012 season, Comet received an updated braking system and a new control system from Velocity Magnetics. The new system uses a combination of magnetic and friction brakes, which allows for two-train operation.

The ride received a significant amount of retracking following the 2026 season. Some of the replaced wood was original to the ride's 1951 debut year.

== Ride experience ==
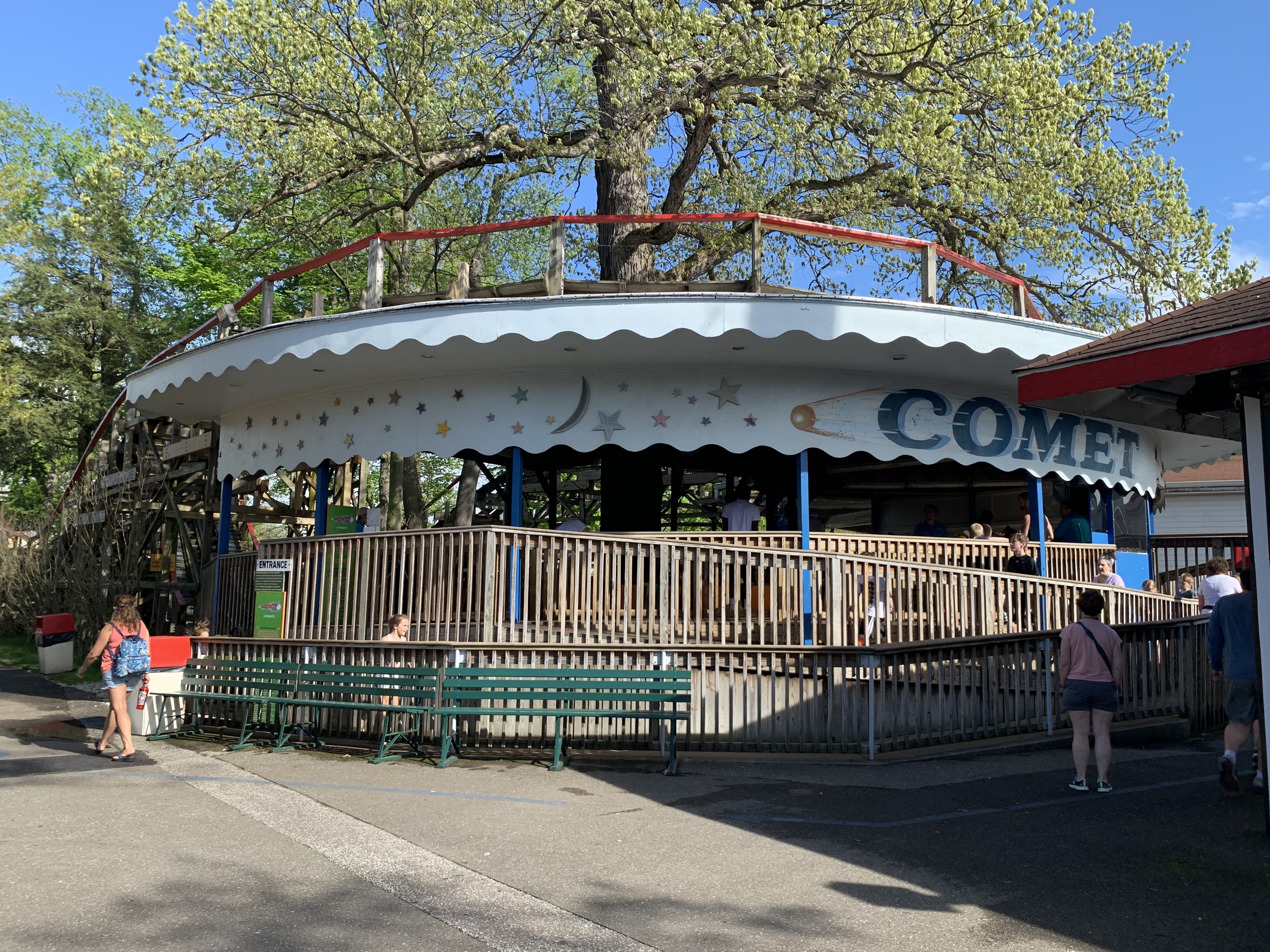
The outside of Comet's station in 2022

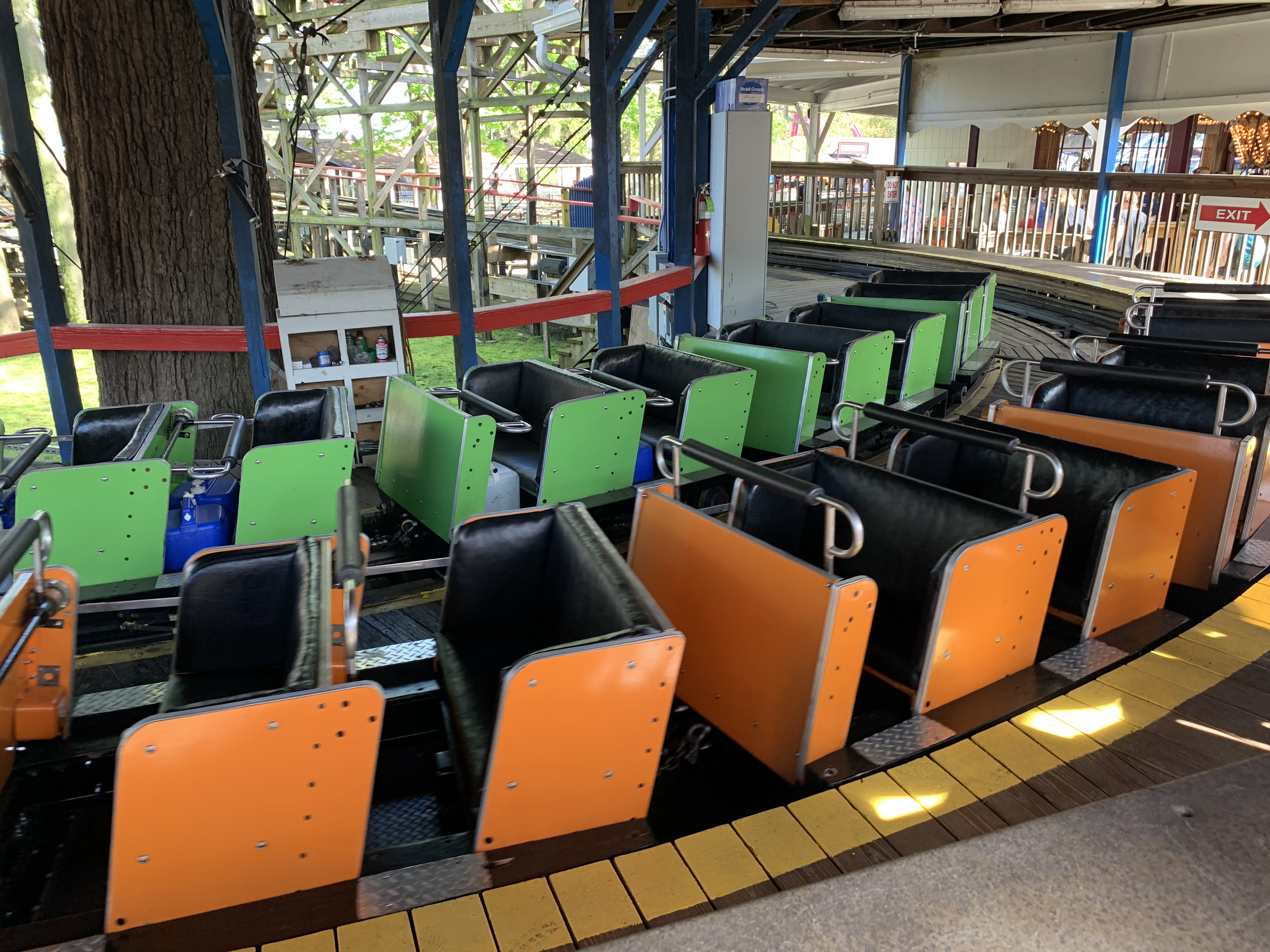
Comet's trains in 2022

The ride begins with a right turn out of the station into a 37 feet (11 m) chain lift hill. It descends a 25 feet (7.6 m) first drop before immediately ascending up into a left turn. It drops again, into two airtime hills, and curves through a righthand turn over the station. Then it drops into a series of two bunny hops and traverses a right curve directly underneath the first left curve. It then drops into two final bunny hops before entering the brake run and turning right to return to the station.

== Characteristics ==
The ride is 37 feet (11 m) tall, with a largest drop of 25 feet (7.6 m). In its minute and 24 second-long ride cycle duration, it reaches top speeds of 25 miles per hour (40 km/h). It has 1,300 feet (400 m) of track.

== Trains ==
Comet has two Junior PTC trains of four cars, all of which utilize flanged wheels. Each car has two rows that hold two riders, for a maximum of 16 riders per train. Riders are restrained by a single buzz bar-style lap bar (named for the buzzing sound it makes when locked and unlocked). Although the ride has always had two trains, only one would be placed into daily operation before its braking upgrades, as the park was not comfortable with the risk for collisions that running two trains with manually operated skid brakes posed.

The ride opened with a pair of red and blue trains from PTC. At some point in the 1990s or early 2000s, the ride's trains were replaced with its current green and orange trains.

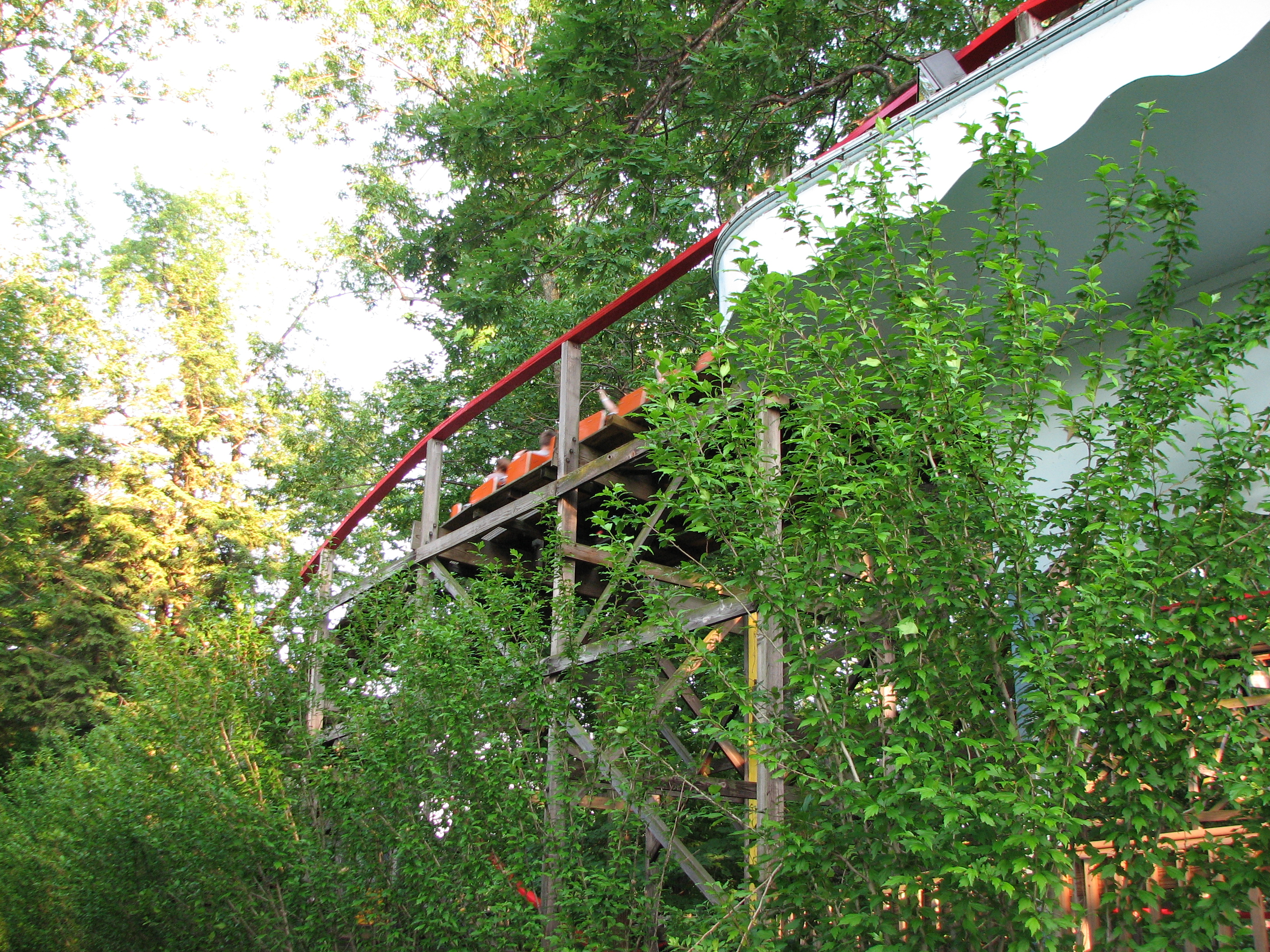
Comet in 2008
