= Waldameer & Water World =

Amusement park in Erie, Pennsylvania

- Previously known as Waldameer Beach Park (1930s)

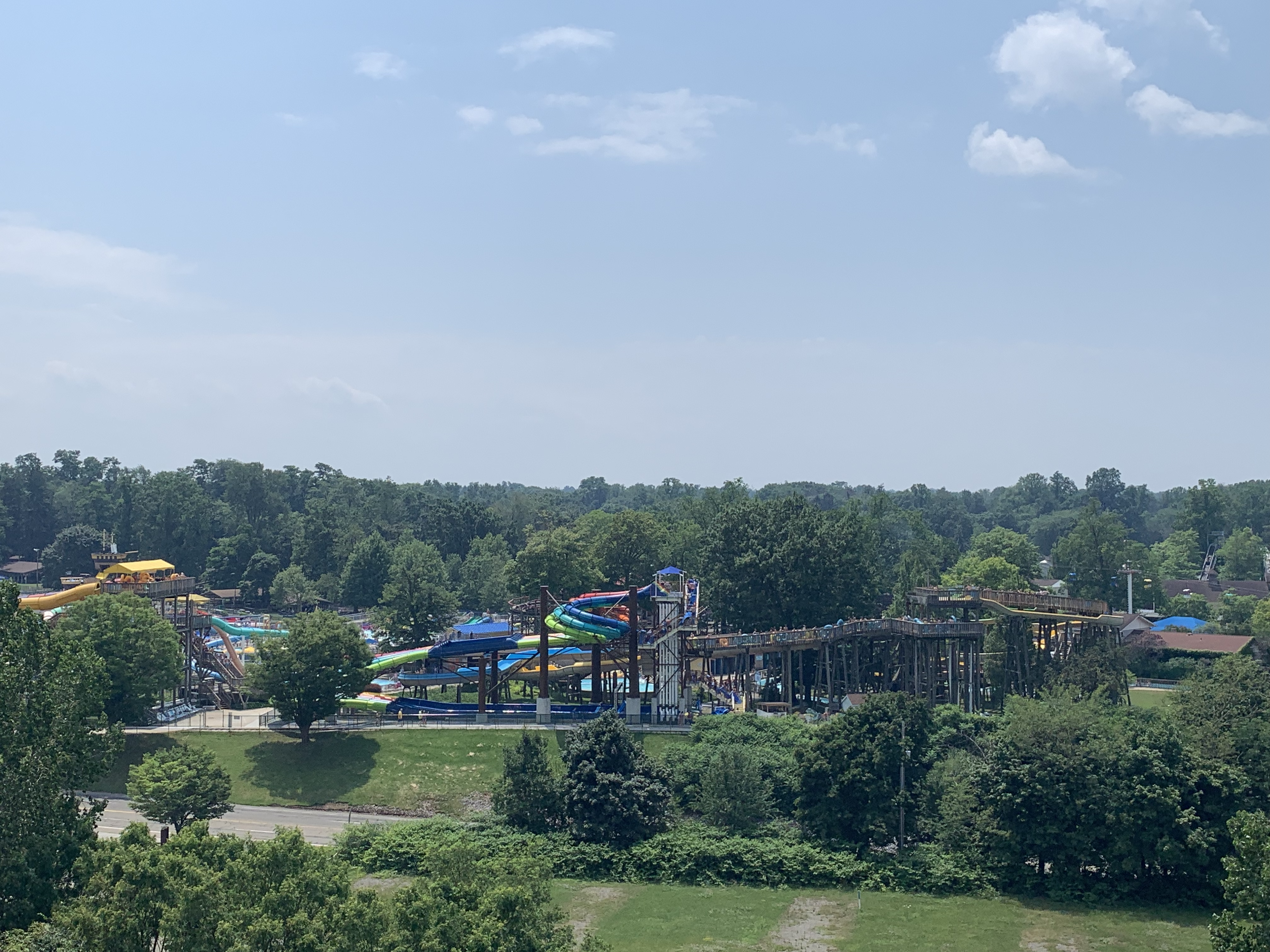
- Water World and a portion of the amusement park as seen from the Tom Ridge Environmental Center in 2021
- Interactive map of Waldameer & Water World
- Location: Erie, Pennsylvania, U.S.
- Coordinates: 42°06′31″N 80°09′20″W
- Status: Operating
- Opened: 1896
- Owner: Erie Electric Motor Company (1896–1920s); Marine Bank (1920s–1945); Alex Moeller (1945–1965); Lydia Ruth Moeller (1965–1978); Paul Nelson (1978–2023); Laine Nelson (2023–present)
- General manager: Steve Gorman
- Slogan: "The joy spot of Erie!"; "Just for fun!"; "You're gonna love it!"; "Fun is in the air!"
- Operating season: Early May to Labor Day
- Area: 34 acres (14 ha)

Attractions
- Total: 49
- Roller coasters: 5
- Water rides: 13
- Website: www.waldameer.com

Waldameer & Water World is an amusement park and water park at the base of Presque Isle in Erie, Pennsylvania, United States. Having opened in 1896, Waldameer is the fourth oldest amusement park in Pennsylvania, the sixth oldest in the nation, and one of only thirteen trolley parks still operating in the country. It is home to several notable rides, including the Ravine Flyer II roller coaster.

The amusement park has free admission and features 36 rides, an arcade, and covered picnic facilities. The rides require either the scanning of a paid wristband before riding, or the use of "Wally Points" on the "Wally Card" system. The water park, Water World, operates an assortment of 13 water slides and pools, and is admission by fee only. The name "Waldameer" can be translated roughly to "woods by the sea" in German.

== History ==
Prior to 1896, the land which would hold the park was a picnic area known as Hoffman's Grove. The Erie Electric Motor Company leased the park in 1896 and renamed it "Waldameer" to appeal to the area's large German immigrant population. The trolley car company extended service to its new park, making Waldameer a terminus on the line in the hopes of increasing passenger traffic. Early draws of the park included its beaches, a dance hall that often featured live music, its 1905 carousel, and a German beer garden featuring singing waiters.

The park's first roller coaster, Figure Eight, opened in 1902. In the early 1910s, it was renovated and renamed Dip the Dips. A second roller coaster, Scenic Railway, opened in 1915 and operated until 1919. In 1922, the John A. Miller-designed Ravine Flyer coaster opened.

In the 1920s, the park was brought under the management of longtime employee Alex Moeller, after its ownership had been transferred from the Erie Electric Motor Company to a local bank when the motor company exited the trolley business as automobiles became a more common form of transportation. The Ye Mill Chutes water ride opened in the 1920s. Many other rides operated through the first half of the 1900s as well, including the Aerial Swing spinning ride, a Flying Scooters, a Whip, and a Tumble Bug.

A dance hall called Rainbow Gardens also exists on the property, having been built in 1925. It replaced the original dance hall which was destroyed in a fire in 1924. Rainbow Gardens was damaged by a fire in 1937, but was repaired. Winter storms in 1937 and 1946 destroyed the Waldameer beaches, which have not been used for beachgoing activities since. In 1937 and 1938, the Dip the Dips and Ravine Flyer roller coasters were removed, the former due to its age and the latter after a man died in an incident while riding it. This left the park without any roller coasters.

By 1945, Alex Moeller had come to own the park. The Great Depression and World War II both impacted the park economically, but it survived by means of offering free entertainment and offering space for others to host events. The park also introduced a Kiddieland section with several smaller rides intended for young children in the late 1940s to accommodate the post-war baby boom. The oldest operating ride at the park, Pony Cart, is located in Kiddieland. Following the end of World War II, Ye Mill Chutes underwent significant renovations and was renamed Mill Run.

In 1951, the Comet roller coaster opened, the first roller coaster to operate at the park since the closure of Ravine Flyer in 1938. Comet has since been designated a Coaster Classic by American Coaster Enthusiasts (ACE) for the preservation of its original and historic ride experience.

From the 1960s onward, many smaller rides were added. In 1962, a Flying Coaster ride unofficially known as "The Bump" opened, and it operated until 1994. In 1964, a Scrambler and a Tilt-A-Whirl were added. In 1973, a Paratrooper replaced the aging Aerial Swing, and in 1977 and 1978, the Spider ride and Sky Ride were added, respectively. Paul Nelson, a longtime park employee and family friend of the Moellers, took on ownership of the park following the deaths of Alex Moeller in 1965 and Moeller's wife in 1978.

Waldameer operates two classic dark attractions: Whacky Shack (built in 1970), a two-story tracked ride, and Pirate's Cove (built in 1972), a walkthrough funhouse. Both were designed and built by dark ride specialist Bill Tracy and his company, Amusement Display Associates, of Cape May, New Jersey.

In 1987, Waldameer opened a water park named Water World, with two large water slides (Lake Erie Dip and the first Presque Isle Plunge), a lazy river, and a children's splash play area (Tad Pool). In order to afford the expansion of Water World, Waldameer sold its 1905 carousel and its figures at auction in 1988 for more than $1 million. A 10-foot giraffe and a jumping horse from the classic carousel were reserved from the auction with plans to be used as decoration in the park.

Most of the auction's proceeds were invested in Water World. Four water slides—a speed slide, a free-fall slide, and one-man and two-man raft slides (Raging River and Wild River)—were added in 1989, all assembled on-site by the local Molded Fiber Glass Union City company. The remaining funds from the auction were used to purchase a new carousel from Chance Rides with 60 operating horses, which also opened in 1989.

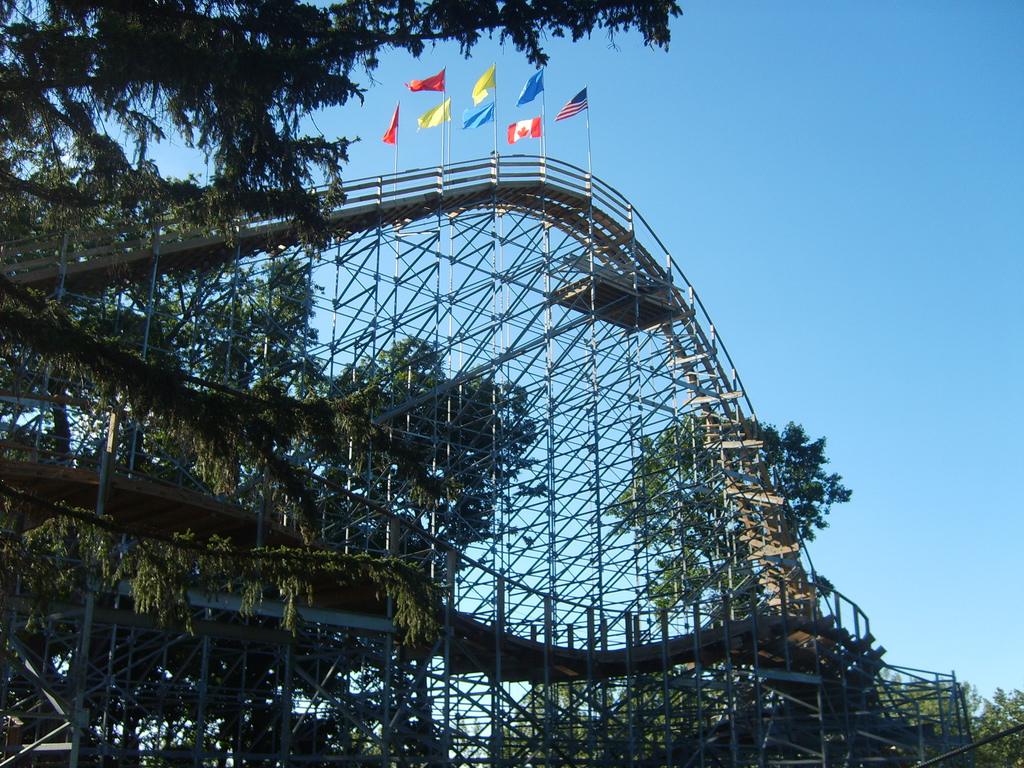
Ravine Flyer II in 2008, its debut year

Official planning for Ravine Flyer II, a new roller coaster to replace the first Ravine Flyer in roughly the same location, began in the early 1990s, but would be plagued by years of legal battles and delays. In the meantime, the 1990s saw the additions of a swinging ship ride named Sea Dragon, a new Ferris wheel, a Wipeout, and an Ali Baba. In 1996, to celebrate Waldameer's 100th operating season, Mill Run was removed, and replaced by Thunder River, a Hopkins Rides log flume with a more compact footprint.

In 2000, a children's coaster built by E&F Miler Industries called Ravine Flyer 3 debuted, despite the fact that Ravine Flyer II would not be completed for another 8 years. In 2004, a spinning coaster manufactured by Maurer AG named Steel Dragon opened. In 2006, the last of the legal battles regarding Ravine Flyer II was won, and the park began construction on the ride. For the 2007 season, Waldameer introduced XScream, a 140-foot-tall drop tower and the tallest ride in the park.

In 2008, the highly anticipated Ravine Flyer II coaster opened, leading to a 20% increase in attendance, and the busiest season in park history up to that point. The coaster won Amusement Today's Golden Ticket Award for "Best New Ride of 2008". The 2009 season saw the extension of the midway south to coincide with the addition of a Zamperla Mega Disk'O ride called Mega Vortex. A modern cashless pay system using "Wally Cards" and "Wally Points" was introduced in 2010. A family-oriented area called the North End opened in 2011 with three new rides: Flying Swings, SS Wally, and Wendy's Tea Party, all built by Zamperla. In 2012, another Zamperla ride, Happy Swing, was added to the park's Kiddieland section. The park also went entirely cashless in 2012.

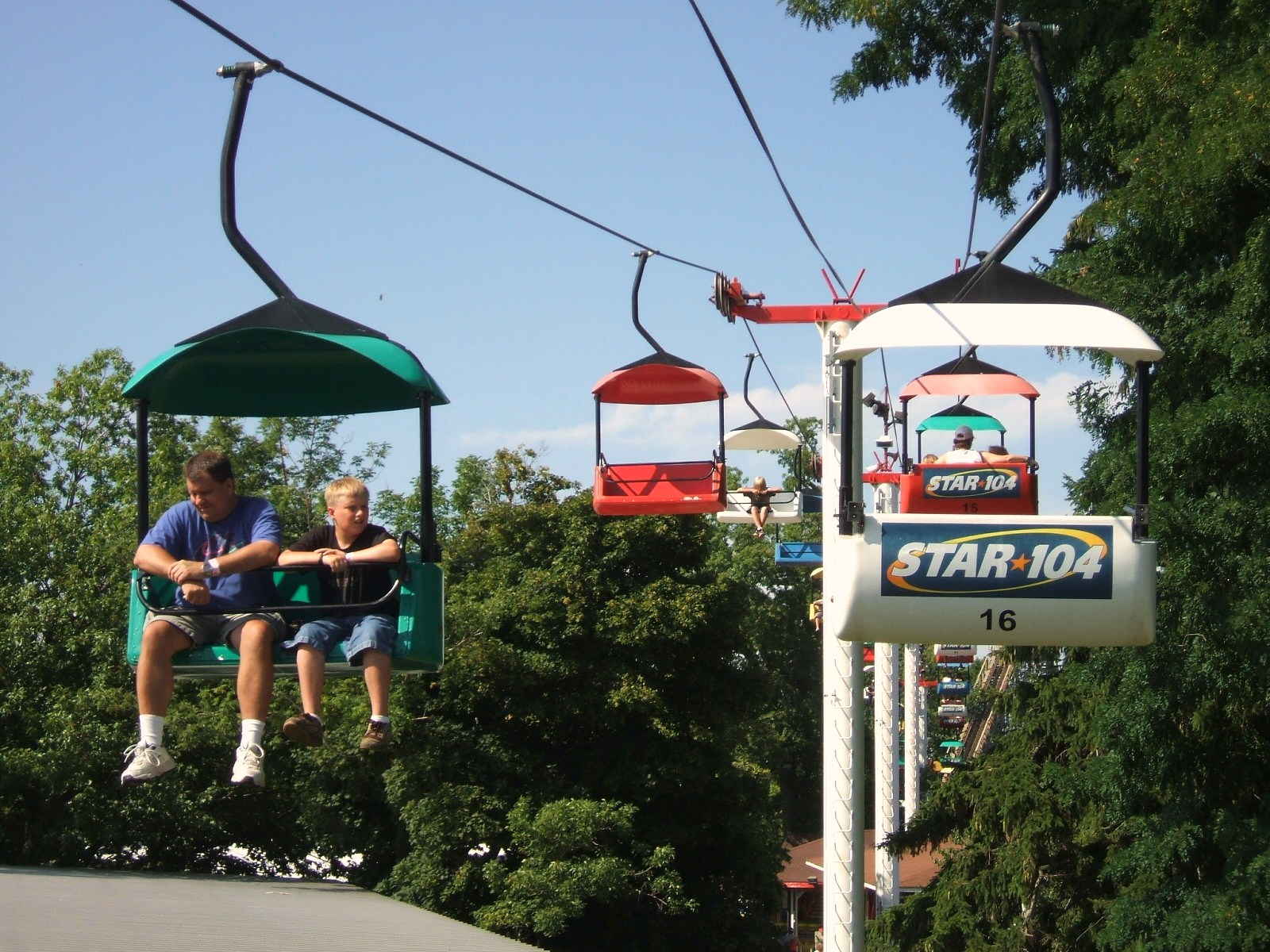
Sky Ride in 2008

In 2015, Waldameer began a Water World expansion project with the opening of the largest wave pool in the tri-state area. Tad Pool, the children's splash play area which was original to Water World, was removed following the 2015 season. The 2016 season saw the addition of a new splash play area and several small slides for young children, known altogether as Kidz Zone. A multi-story children's water play area, dubbed Battle of Lake Erie, was introduced for the 2017 season, inspired by the Battle of Lake Erie and the USS Niagara. New additions for the 2018 season included a bowl slide from ProSlide Technology called Cannon Bowl, and a Zamperla Balloon Race. In 2019, the park installed a Zamperla Discovery Revolution frisbee ride called Chaos.

Although Waldameer opened later than usual in 2020 due to the COVID-19 pandemic, the park still added a compact children's spinning coaster named Whirlwind, built by Italian manufacturer SBF Visa Group. It was the park's first new coaster since the addition of Ravine Flyer II in 2008. Also in 2020, Water World debuted a ProSlide Technology mat racer slide called Rally Racer. In 2023, the park added the ProSlide Technology-designed Rocket Blast water coaster slide to Water World, which later won "Best New Water Park Ride of 2023" from Amusement Today. Rocket Blast is notable for being the only water coaster in the region. On May 22, 2023, it was announced that Paul Nelson, the owner of the park for several decades, had died at the age of 89. Nelson was honored posthumously at the 2024 Golden Ticket Awards with the "Legend Award" for his service to Waldameer.

In 2024, the Spider ride was retired after 47 years of operation. It was replaced in 2025 by Time Twister, a Zamperla NebulaZ ride. Additional improvements for 2025 included a redone entrance to Water World, and the refurbishment and relocation of the Paratrooper ride, the latter of which did not operate for the 2025 season. It returned in 2026, directly south of Steel Dragon, in place of a former picnic grove, which itself was also relocated within the park. In June 2025, Waldameer announced the addition of four new water slides from ProSlide Technology, as well as a new lazy river. The first two of these four slides—Presque Isle Plunge (a TornadoWAVE named after a body slide which previously operated in Water World) and Big Water Bend (a family slide)—as well as the new lazy river, Winding Waters, opened in 2026. The latter two slides do not have confirmed names or opening years. The addition of these slides required the removal of four older slides (Lake Erie Dip, the original Presque Isle Plunge, Raging River, and Wild River) as well as the older heated pool and the original Endless River. In June 2026, the park announced the 2027 addition of Eagle's Pursuit, a launched family roller coaster that will traverse the former beachfront property.

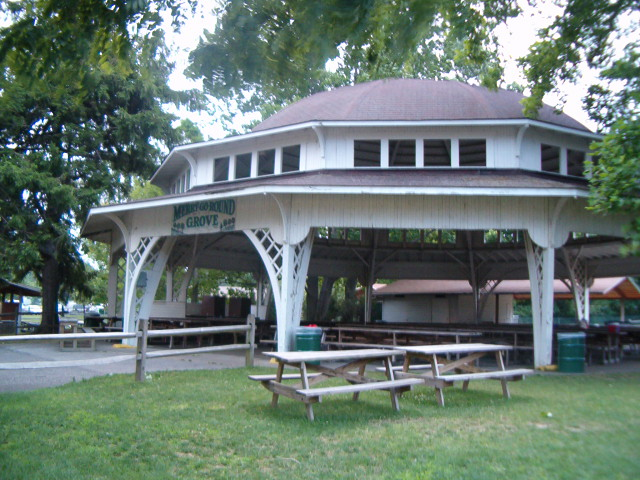
Merry-Go-Round Grove picnic pavilion in 2006. It was home to the park's carousel for a brief time in the 1920s.

Whacky Shack and Pirate's Cove in 2006

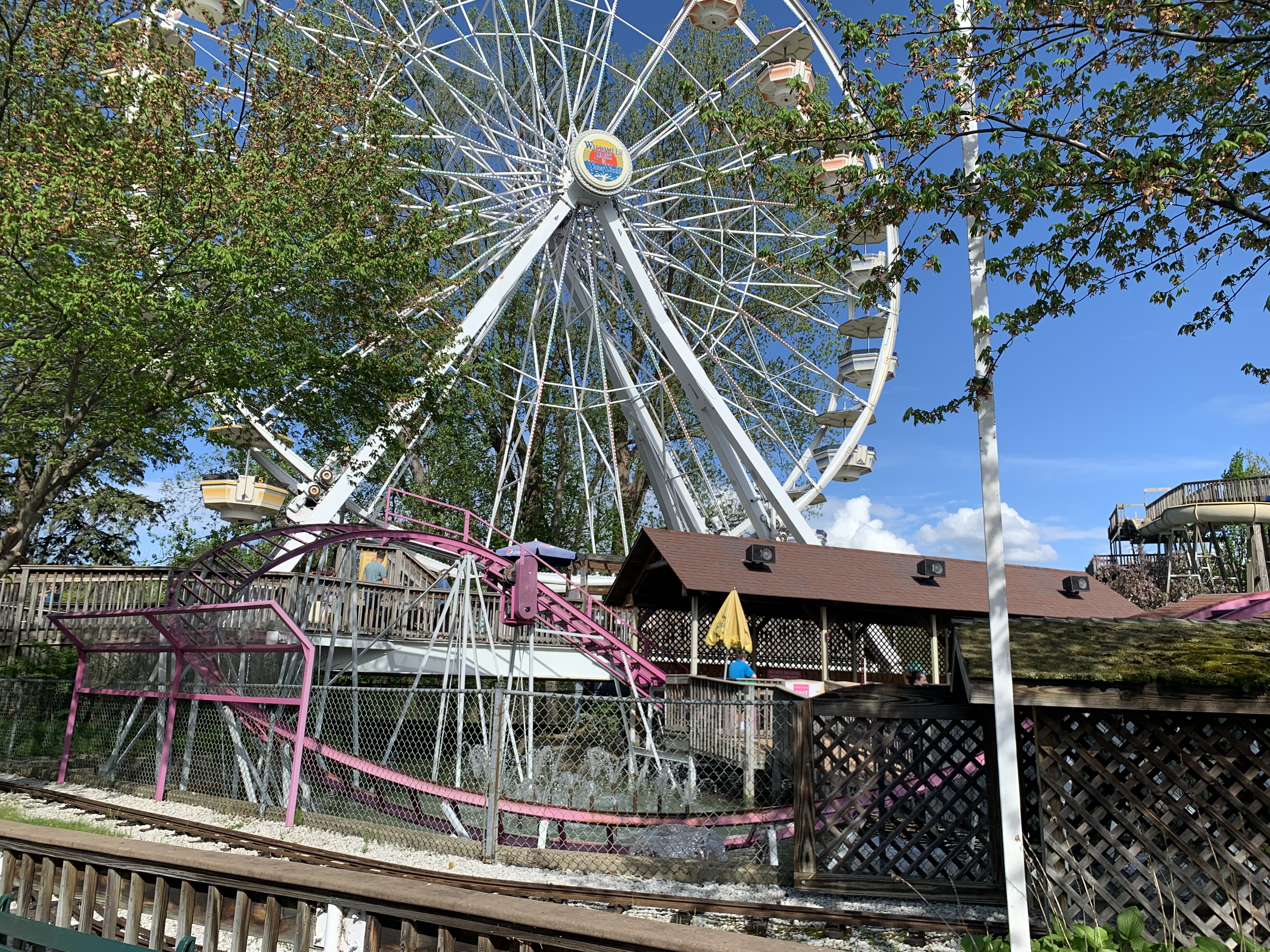
Ferris Wheel and Ravine Flyer 3 in 2022

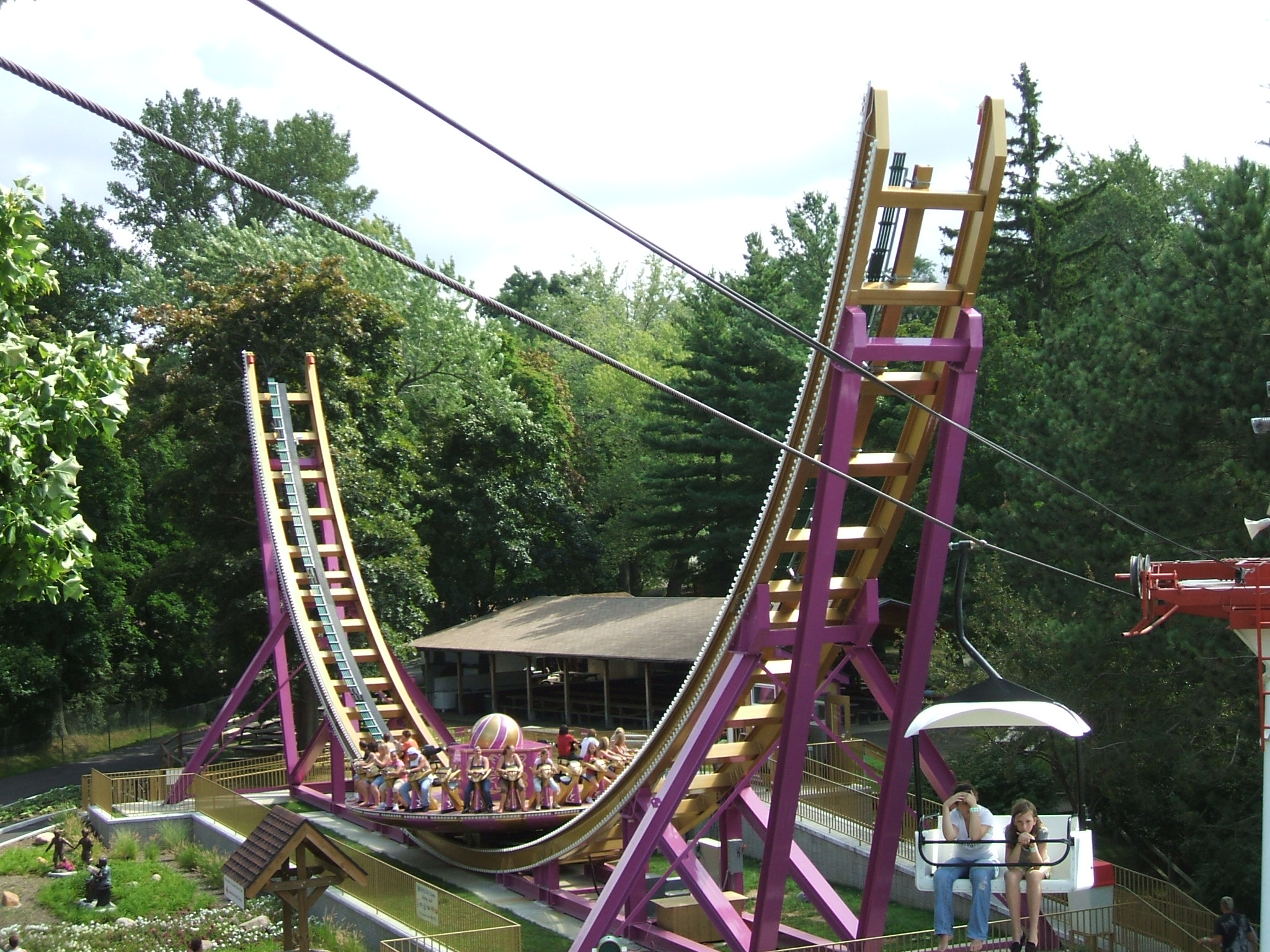
Mega Vortex and Sky Ride in 2009, the former's debut year

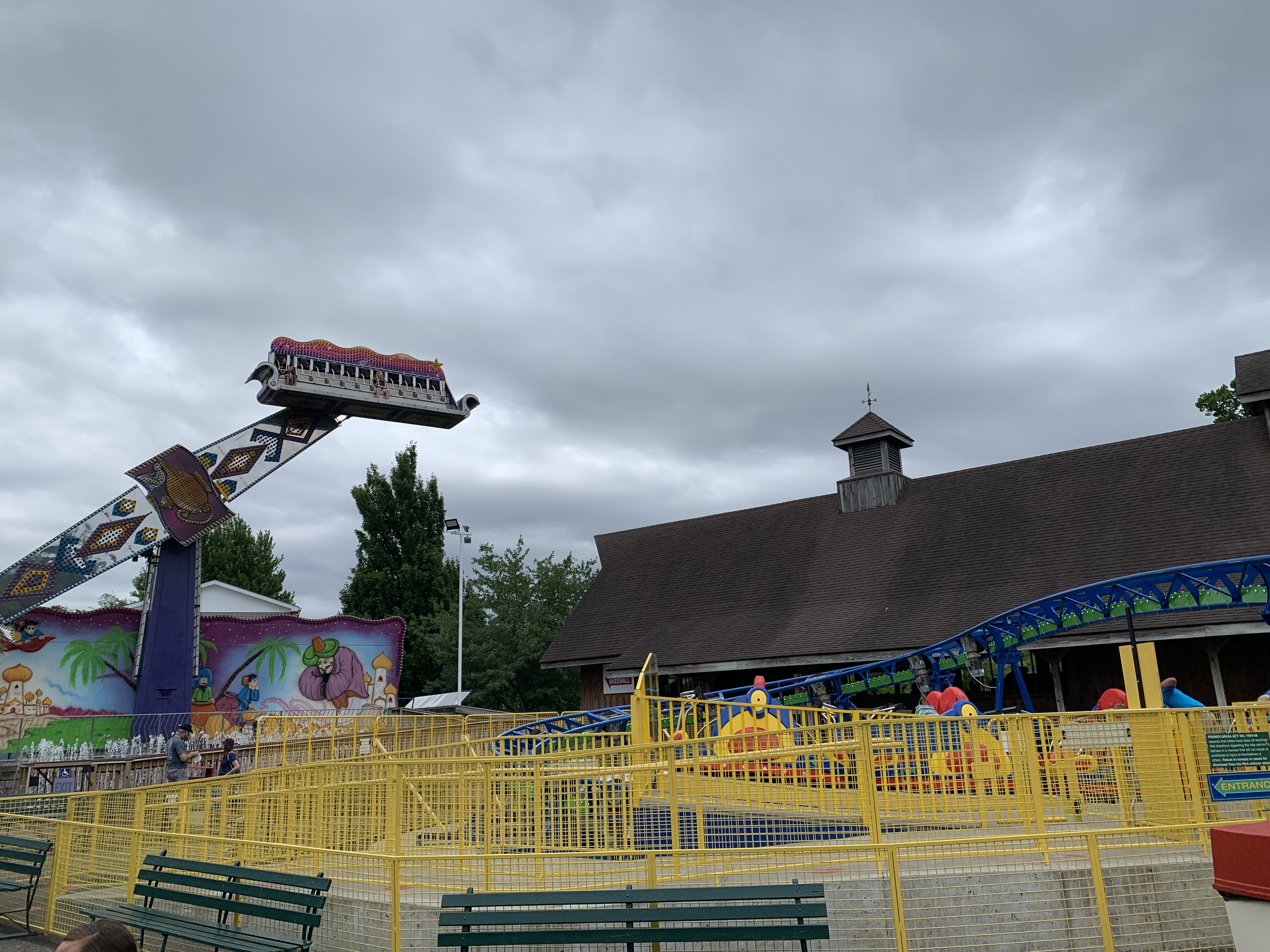
Ali Baba, Whirlwind, and Thunder River's station in 2022

== Current rides ==
=== Waldameer ===
==== Roller coasters ====
Name	Opened	Type	Manufacturer	Height requirement	Notes
Comet	August 1951	Wooden roller coaster	Herbert Paul Schmeck, Philadelphia Toboggan Coasters	46'' and over alone, 36'' to 45'' with a supervising companion	ACE Coaster Classic
Ravine Flyer 3	2000	Steel children's roller coaster (Family Coaster - Custom)	E&F Miler Industries	40'' and over	
Steel Dragon	July 2, 2004	Steel spinning roller coaster (Spinning Coaster - SC 2000)	Maurer AG	50'' and over alone, 46'' to 49'' with a supervising companion, maximum 78''	
Ravine Flyer II	May 17, 2008	Hybrid wooden roller coaster (wooden tracks, steel support structure)	The Gravity Group	48'' and over	Named after the first Ravine Flyer, a coaster that operated at the park from 1922 to 1938 in the same location as Ravine Flyer II. Won "Best New Ride of 2008".
Whirlwind	July 3, 2020	Steel spinning children's roller coaster (Spinning Coasters - MX608 Park Model A)	SBF Visa Group	48'' and over alone, 36'' to 47'' with a supervising companion, maximum 77''	

==== Water rides ====
Name	Opened	Type	Height requirement	Manufacturer
Thunder River	1996	Log flume	42'' and over alone, 36'' to 41'' with a supervising companion	Hopkins Rides

==== Dark rides ====
Name	Opened	Type	Manufacturer	Height requirement	Notes
Whacky Shack	May 24, 1970	Tracked dark ride	Bill Tracy, Amusement Display Associates	42'' and over alone, 30'' to 41'' with a supervising companion	Queue audio by Feartek
Pirate's Cove	1972	Walkthrough dark ride	Bill Tracy, Amusement Display Associates	42'' and over alone, 30'' to 41'' with a supervising companion	

==== Thrill rides ====
Name	Opened	Type	Manufacturer	Height requirement	Notes
Scrambler	1964	Scrambler	Eli Bridge Company	48'' and over alone, 36'' to 47'' with a supervising companion, no single riders	
Tilt-A-Whirl	1964	Tilt-A-Whirl	Sellner Manufacturing	46'' and over alone, 36'' to 45'' with a supervising companion	
Paratrooper	1973/May 2, 2026	Paratrooper	Frank Hrubetz & Company	46'' and over alone, 36'' to 45'' with a supervising companion	Temporarily removed following the 2024 season to allow for the remodeling of the Water World entrance and a nearby food stand. Returned in 2026 immediately south of Steel Dragon following a refurbishment. 2026 hydraulics by Peak Hydraulics.
Sea Dragon	1992	Pirate ship (Pharaoh's Fury)	Chance Rides	48'' and over alone, 36'' to 47'' with a supervising companion	
Wipeout	1995	Wipeout	Chance Rides	42'' and over alone	
Ali Baba	1999	Ali Baba	A.R.M. Rides	42'' and over alone	
XScream	2007	Drop tower (Super Shot Park)	A.R.M. Rides, Larson International	48'' and over alone	Named in a competition. Opened early for two days in November 2006 for a charity event.
Mega Vortex	May 2, 2009	Disk'O (Mega Disk'O)	Zamperla	48'' and over alone	Named in a competition
Flying Swings	May 7, 2011	Swing ride (Flying Carousel)	Zamperla	48'' and over alone, 36'' to 47'' with a supervising companion	Opened a weekend early in April 2011 for a charity event
Music Express	May 11, 2013	Music Express	Bertazzon	52'' and over alone	Opened early for a day in December 2012 for a season passholder event
Chaos	May 4, 2019	Frisbee (Discovery Revolution 16)	Zamperla	48'' and over alone	Opened a weekend early in April 2019 for a season passholder event
Time Twister	May 3, 2025	NebulaZ	Zamperla	42'' and over alone	

==== Family rides ====
Name	Opened	Type	Manufacturer	Height requirement	Notes
L. Ruth Express	1972	Train ride	Chance Rides	42'' and over alone	Named after Lydia Ruth Moeller, the wife of former park owner Alex Moeller
Dodgems	1973	Bumper cars	Majestic Manufacturing, Ninja	48'' and over alone and to drive, 42'' to 47'' with a supervising companion	Dodgems have been a constant attraction at the park since the 1920s, but the current building for them was constructed in 1973. The current fleet of cars was purchased in 1997.
Sky Ride	1978	Elevated gondola ride (Sky Ride)	Hopkins Rides	46'' and over alone, 36'' to 45'' with a supervising companion	
Merry-Go-Round	1989	Carousel	Chance Rides	42'' and over alone and to ride on a horse	Formerly referred to in some park media as "Grand Carousel"
Ferris Wheel	1994	Ferris wheel (Giant Wheel)	Chance Rides	42'' and over without a supervising companion, 30'' to 41'' with a supervising companion, no single riders	Referred to in some ride signage as "Giant Wheel" and "Giant Gondola Wheel"
SS Wally	May 7, 2011	Rockin' Tug	Zamperla	42'' and over alone, 30'' to 41'' with a supervising companion	Opened a weekend early in April 2011 for a charity event
Wendy's Tea Party	May 7, 2011	Teacups (Tea Cup Midi 6)	Zamperla	36'' and over alone, 30'' to 35'' with a supervising companion	Opened a weekend early in April 2011 for a charity event
Balloon Race	May 5, 2018	Balloon Race (Samba Balloon 8)	Zamperla	36'' and over alone, 30'' to 35'' with a supervising companion	

==== Children's rides ====
Name	Opened	Type	Manufacturer	Height requirement	Notes
Pony Cart	1940s	Miniature spinning pony ride	B.A. Schiff & Associates	30'' and over alone, 54'' maximum	Referred to in some park media as "Pony Carts"
Umbrella Ride	1950s	Miniature spinning car ride	Hampton Amusement Company	30'' and over alone, 54'' maximum	
Sky Fighter	1951	Miniature spinning rocket ship ride	Allan Herschell Company	30'' and over alone, 54'' maximum	
Wet Boats	1959	Miniature spinning boat ride	B.A. Schiff & Associates	30'' and over alone, 54'' maximum	
Lil' Toot	1994	Miniature rider-powered train ride	Alter Enterprises	30'' and over alone, 54'' maximum	
Big Rigs	1999	Miniature truck ride (Convoy)	Zamperla	36'' and over alone, 30'' with a supervising companion, over 54'' must be accompanying child under 54''	
Frog Hopper	1999	Miniature drop tower (Frog Hopper)	S&S Worldwide	36'' and over alone, over 54'' must be accompanying child under 54''	
Happy Swing	May 12, 2012	Miniature motorized swing (Happy Swing 12)	Zamperla	36'' and over alone, 31'' to 35'' with a supervising companion, maximum 73''	

==== Upcoming rides ====
Name	Expected opening date	Type	Manufacturer	Height requirement
Eagle's Pursuit	April 2027	Steel launched roller coaster (Family Launch Coaster)	Vekoma	38''

=== Water World ===
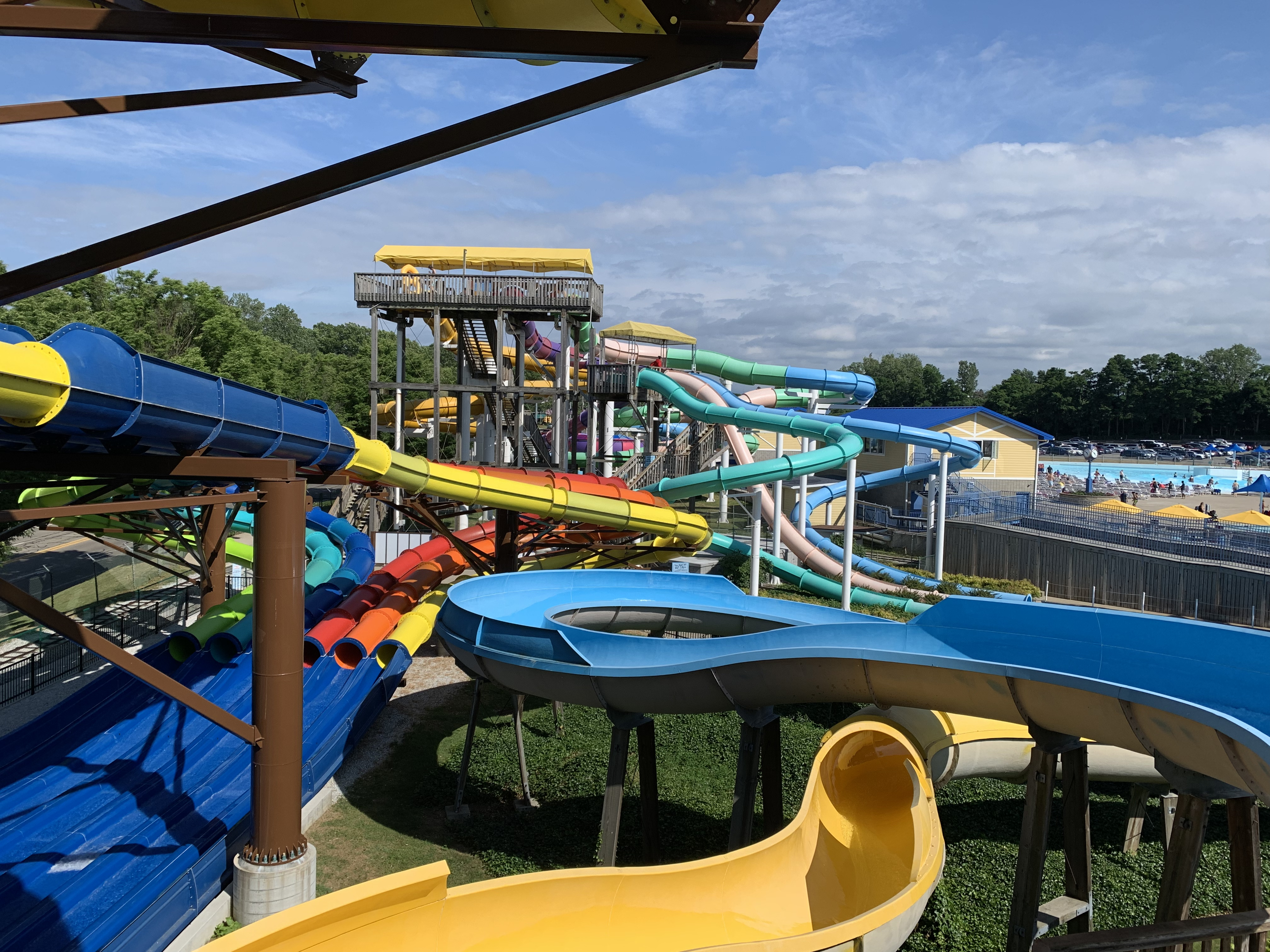
From left to right: Rally Racer, Liquid Lightning, Cannon Bowl, Awesome Twosome, Bermuda Triangle, Raging River, and Wild River, as seen in 2022

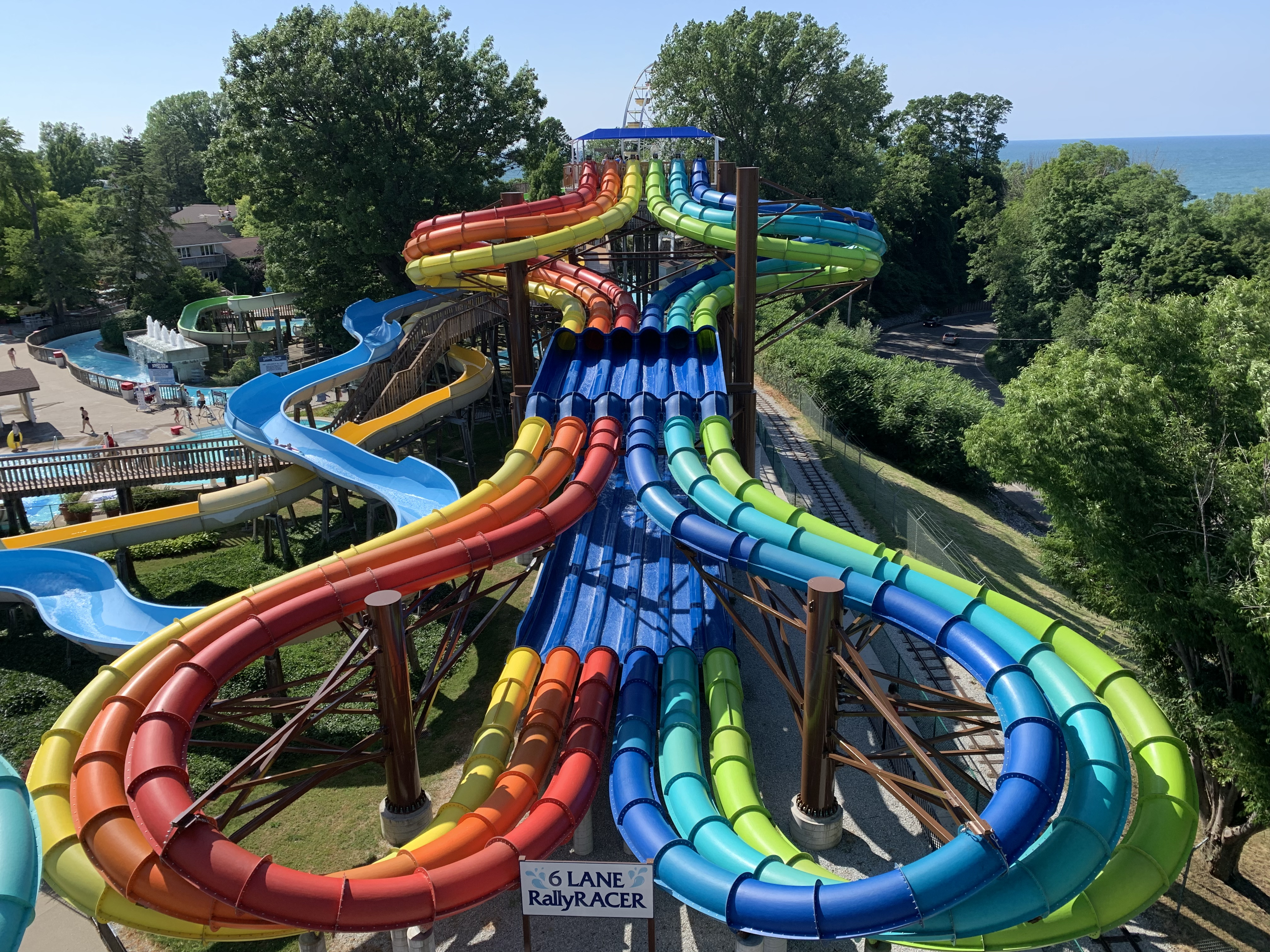
Rally Racer from above in 2022

Water World is a water park located in Waldameer. Established on June 18, 1987, Water World currently contains eight major water slides, a heated pool, the tri-state area's largest wave pool, two children's play areas, and a lazy river. There are two additional slides planned for Water World beyond 2026.

==== Current attractions ====
Name	Opened	Type	Manufacturer	Height requirement	Notes
Bermuda Triangle	1990	Three enclosed one-person body water slides	WhiteWater West	42'' and over alone	Three-slide complex, featuring two curved slides and one freefall slide
Awesome Twosome	1991	One or two-person inner tube water slide with open-air and enclosed portions (PIPELine)	ProSlide Technology	48'' and over alone, 42'' to 47'' with a supervising companion	Part of the Awesome Tower slide complex alongside Liquid Lightning and Cannon Bowl
Liquid Lightning Formerly Midnight Plunge (1992–2013)	1992	Enclosed one or two-person inner tube water slide	ProSlide Technology	48'' and over alone, 42'' to 47'' with a supervising companion	Originally named Midnight Plunge. Renamed in 2014 after a planned third slide that never came to be. Part of the Awesome Tower slide complex alongside Cannon Bowl and Awesome Twosome.
Wave Pool	May 29, 2015	Wave pool	Aquatic Development Group	48'' and over alone, life jacket required if under 48''	Referred to in some park media as "Giant Wave Pool". One of the largest wave pools on the East coast and the largest in the tri-state area.
Kidz Zone	July 23, 2016	Children's water play area with eight one-person body water slides (some open-air, some enclosed) and several water features	ProSlide Technology	No minimum height requirement, 54'' maximum for water slides	Referred to in some park media as "Kidz Slide n' Spray Zone" and "Kidz Slide & Spray Zone". Has 31 water features overall. Water features by Rain Drop.
Battle of Lake Erie	July 28, 2017	Children's water play area with multiple levels, multiple sprinklers, and seven one-person body water slides (some open-air, some enclosed) (RideHOUSE 500)	ProSlide Technology	No height requirements	Inspired by the Battle of Lake Erie. Has 102 water features overall.
Cannon Bowl	May 25, 2018	One or two-person inner tube water slide with open-air and enclosed portions (CannonBOWL 30)	ProSlide Technology	48'' and over alone, 42'' to 47'' with a supervising companion	Part of the Awesome Tower slide complex alongside Liquid Lightning and Awesome Twosome
Giant Heated Relaxing Pool	May 24, 2019	Heated pool	Unknown	48'' and over alone, 30'' to 47'' with a supervising companion	Referred to in some park media as "Heated Relaxing Pool"
Rally Racer	July 3, 2020	Six-lane racing mat water slide with open-air and enclosed portions (RallyRACER)	ProSlide Technology	42'' and over alone	Referred to in some ride signage as 6 LANE RallyRACER
Rocket Blast	June 15, 2023	Four-person raft water coaster slide with open-air and enclosed portions (RocketBLAST)	ProSlide Technology	48'' and over alone, 42'' to 47'' with a supervising companion, no single riders	Won the Golden Ticket Award for "Best New Water Park Ride of 2023"
Presque Isle Plunge	June 5, 2026	Five-person raft water slide with open-air and enclosed portions (TornadoWAVE 60)	ProSlide Technology	48'' and over alone	Named after the first Presque Isle Plunge, a slide that operated at the park from 1987 to 2025 in the same location as the second Presque Isle Plunge
Big Water Bend	June 5, 2026	Five-person raft water slide with open-air and enclosed portions (MAMMOTH)	ProSlide Technology	48'' and over alone, 42'' to 47'' with a supervising companion	
Winding Waters	September 5, 2026	Lazy river	Wet Engineering	42'' and over alone	Water features by Rain Drop

==== Upcoming attractions ====
Name	Expected opening date	Type	Manufacturer	Notes
N/A	Unknown	"Dueling and twister" inner tube water slides with open-air and enclosed portions (Dueling PipeLINE and Serpentine)	ProSlide Technology	Three slides in total

== Former rides and attractions ==
=== Former roller coasters ===
Name	Opened	Closed	Type	Manufacturer	Notes
Figure Eight/Coney Island Scenic Coaster/Dip the Dips	1902	1937	Wooden side-friction roller coaster	T. M. Harton Company	Figure Eight was transformed into Dip the Dips in the late 1910s. It was known as Coney Island Scenic Coaster in the 1920s.
Scenic Railway	1907	1919	Wooden scenic railway roller coaster	Frederick Ingersoll	
Ravine Flyer	May 28, 1922	August 7, 1938	Wooden roller coaster	John A. Miller, Harry C. Baker, and George Sinclair	Peninsula Drive was constructed beneath two of its dips with permission from Waldameer in 1924. It closed in 1938 following the accidental death of a rider. Replaced by Ravine Flyer II.

=== Former rides ===
A miniature upcharge children's carousel that operated in the park's arcade for part of the 2026 season

Name	Opened	Closed	Type	Manufacturer	Notes
Whirly-Gig/Razzle Dazzle	1900s	Unknown	Whirly-Gig	W.F. Mangels Company	
Carousel	1901	1904	Carousel	Unknown	One of three carousels to have operated at Waldameer. Replaced by the 1905 carousel.
Toboggan Slide	1904	1937 or the 1940s	Toboggan water slide into Lake Erie	Unknown	
Carousel	1905	1988	Carousel	T. M. Harton Company	One of three carousels to have operated at Waldameer. Figures were auctioned off in 1988 to fund the expansion of Water World. Replaced by Merry-Go-Round.
Skyrocket Formerly Aerial Swing	1900s	1972	Spinning ride	Unknown	Featured wicker gondolas as rider vehicles upon opening. Was updated with vehicles shaped like airplanes in the 1920s, and again in 1946 with vehicles shaped like rocket ships.
House of Hilarity	1907	Unknown	Funhouse	T. M. Harton Company	
Mill Run Formerly Ye Mill Chutes (1920–1940s)	1920s	1995	Mill chute	George Sinclair	In the years following World War II, Ye Mill Chutes underwent a renovation which removed its tunnel and made its drop smaller. It was subsequently renamed Mill Run. In the years since its removal it has been increasingly referred to as "Old Mill".
Caterpillar	1920s	Unknown	Caterpillar	Traver Engineering Company	One of two Caterpillar rides to have operated at Waldameer
The Whip	1920s	Unknown	The Whip	W.F. Mangels Company	One of two The Whip rides to have operated at Waldameer
Custer Cars	1920s	Unknown	Custer Cars	Custer Specialty Company	Known to have operated as early as 1924
Victory Special Previous name unknown (1924–1940s)	1924	Unknown	Train ride	Dayton Fun House Company, National Amusement Devices	Given the name Victory Special during the World War II era. It had at least three different trains, the first of which was built by Dayton Fun House Company. A train built by National Amusement Devices was installed in 1947.
Bluebeard's Castle	1920s	1938	Funhouse	Unknown	Destroyed by a fire in 1938
Bumper Cars/Dodgem	Late 1920s	1972	Bumper cars	Unknown	Removed to make way for the current-day Dodgems
Blue Goose	1930	1988	Miniature carousel	Spillman Engineering Company	Figures were auctioned off in 1988 to fund the expansion of Water World
Loop-O-Plane	1930s	1950s	Loop-O-Plane	Eyerly Aircraft Company	
Fun in the Dark	May 26, 1939	1950	Dark ride	Pretzel Amusement Ride Company	Featured 10 animatronic figures, including a Laughing Sam. Sold to fund the addition of Comet.
Ben Hur Chariot Race	May 26, 1939	Unknown	Spinning ride	Unknown	
Flying Scooter	Circa 1944	1976	Flying Scooters	Bisch Rocco	Replaced by Spider in 1977
Airplane Swing/Kiddie Swings	Unknown	Unknown	Miniature spinning plane children's ride	Unknown	Known to have operated in the 1940s
Whip	1944	1947	The Whip	W.F. Mangels Company	One of two The Whip rides to have operated at Waldameer. Sold following the 1947 season. Replaced by the 1948 Caterpillar.
Skyview Ferris Wheel	1944	Late 1950s	Ferris wheel (#5 Eli Big Wheel)	Eli Bridge Company	Destroyed when it fell from a crane during an attempt to move it elsewhere in the park
Tumble Bug	1944	Late 1950s	Tumble Bug	Traver Engineering Company	
Caterpillar	1948	1950	Caterpillar	Allan Herschell Company	One of two Caterpillar rides to have operated at Waldameer. Sold to fund the addition of Comet. Replaced by Looper.
Little Chief Fire Engine	Unknown	Unknown	Scenic ride in a fire truck	Unknown	Known to have operated in the 1950s
Unknown	Unknown	Unknown	Miniature spinning fire trucks children's ride	Unknown	Known to have operated as early as 1961 and as late as the 1970s
Kiddie Turnpike	Unknown	Circa 1983	Miniature children's car ride	Unknown	Known to have operated as early as 1961. Replaced by Bumper Boats in 1984.
Looper	Unknown	Circa 1963	Looper	Allan Herschell Company	Replaced by Tilt-A-Whirl in 1964
Flying Coaster/"The Bump"	1962	1994	Flying Coaster	John Norman Bartlett, Aeroaffiliates	Unofficially known as "The Bump". Replaced by Wipeout in 1995.
Spider	1977	September 2, 2024	Octopus	Eyerly Aircraft Company	Replaced by Time Twister in 2025. Relocated to The Terrortorium Haunted House & Amusements in Oxford, Alabama, where it still operates today.
Mini Enterprise/"Mini E"	1983	September 2, 2013	Spinning children's ride (Mini Enterprise)	Zamperla	Removed in 2013 to allow for the expansion of the park's entrance and admission booths. Relocated to Alabama Adventure & Splash Adventure in Bessemer, Alabama, where it operated as Helicopter Heroes for a single season before being removed.
Bumper Boats	1984	1999	Bumper boats	Unknown	Replaced by Ravine Flyer 3
Li'l Sneak	1984	Circa 1998	Miniaturebumper boats	Unknown	Replaced by Big Rigs
N/A	July 5, 2006	July 16, 2006	Drop tower (Super Shot 200)	A.R.M. Rides, Larson International	Installed from July 5 to July 16 of 2006 to gauge the public's interest in a drop tower before the purchase of a permanent installation
N/A	2017	2017	Miniature back-and-forth children's rides	Unknown	Four small upcharge children's rides
N/A	May 2, 2026	2026	Miniature carousel	Unknown	Upcharge children's carousel

=== Former Water World attractions ===
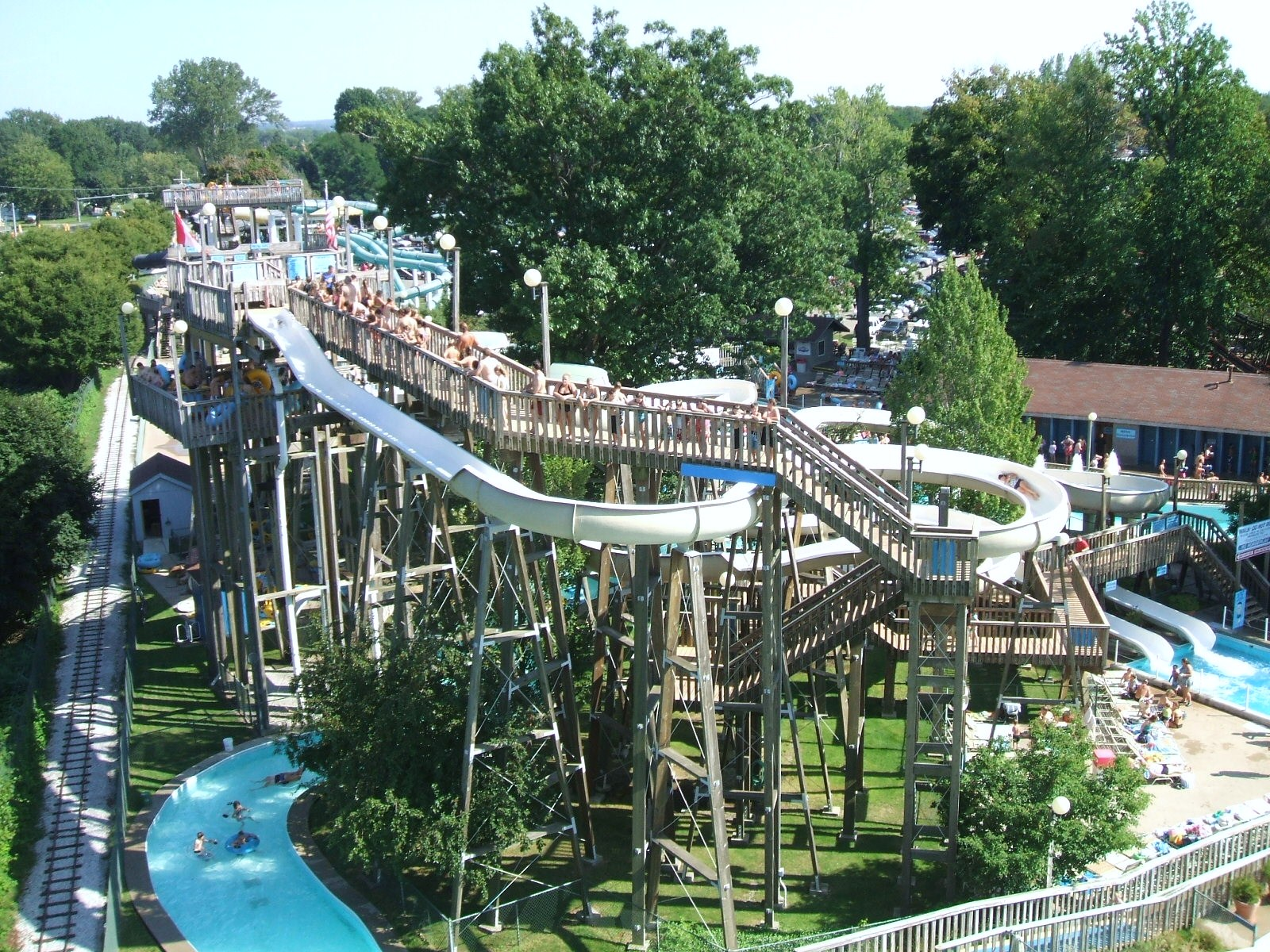
Lake Erie Dip and the first Presque Isle Plunge in 2008

Name	Opened	Closed	Type	Manufacturer	Notes
Tad Pool	June 18, 1987	2015	Children's water play area with water features and five body water slides (Dragon Slide, Frog Creek, Hydro Tube, Minnow Run, and Otter Slide) (some open, some enclosed) (all were one-person except for the largest, which allowed multiple children to slide at once)	Unknown	Featured three tiers known as Tad Pool, Cookie Pool, and Raindrop Pool. Removed following the 2015 season, and replaced by Kidz Zone (though the latter stands on a plot of land that Tad Pool did not use).
Endless River Previously Lazy River	June 18, 1987	August 17, 2025	Lazy river	Unknown	Originally opened as Lazy River before being renamed a few years later to avoid issues with the term "lazy river" being trademarked. Replaced by Winding Waters.
Lake Erie Dip	June 18, 1987	August 17, 2025	Open-air one-person body water slide	Water Forms	Located on the "Water World Island" in a tower complex that also featured the first Presque Isle Plunge. Removed following the 2025 season to make way for a new slide complex.
Presque Isle Plunge	June 18, 1987	August 17, 2025	Open-air one-person body water slide	Water Forms	Located on the "Water World Island" in a tower complex that also featured Lake Erie Dip. Removed following the 2025 season to make way for a new slide complex.
Heated Relaxing Pool	1988	September 1, 2025	Heated pool	Unknown	Removed following the 2025 season to make way for a new slide complex
Free-Fall Slide	1989	September 2, 2019	Open-air one-person body/speed water slide (PLUMMET/FreeFALL)	Cascade, ProSlide Technology	Shared a tower complex with Speed Slide. Removed following the 2019 season to make way for Rally Racer.
Speed Slide	1989	September 2, 2019	Open-air one-person body/speed water slide (PLUMMET/FreeFALL)	Cascade, ProSlide Technology	Shared a tower complex with Free-Fall Slide. Removed following the 2019 season to make way for Rally Racer.
Raging River	1989	September 1, 2025	Open-air one or two-person inner tube water slide (PIPELine/VIPER)	ProSlide Technology	Shared a tower complex with Wild River. Removed following the 2025 season to make way for a new slide complex.
Wild River	1989	September 1, 2025	Open-air one or two-person inner tube water slide	Cascade	Shared a tower complex with Raging River. Removed following the 2025 season to make way for a new slide complex.

=== Other former attractions ===
- Original trolleys (1896–1935)
- Bowling alley (first half of the 20th century)
- Original penny arcade (first half of the 20th century)
- Pony rides and donkey rides (first half of the 20th century)
- Skating rink (first half of the 20th century)
- Snake Pit (first half of the 20th century)
- Beach observation tower (1900s–unknown)
- Clamshell theater (1900s–1908)
- Campsites and cottages on the beach (1900s–1937 or the 1940s)
- Lagoon and boat docks for canoeing and rowing (1900s–the 1940s)
- Boardwalk (1901–1937 or the 1940s)
- Original dance hall (1902–1924)
- Bathhouse (1903–1946)
- Hofbrau German Beer Garden/German Village (1909–1941)
- Café (1910s–unknown)
- Swimming pool on the beach (1920s–1937 or 1946)
- Toonerville Trolley funicular to the beach and back (1920–1937 or 1946)
- Monkey Island (1930s–1950s)
- Tricky Golf Course (1950s–late 1970s)
- Moon Walk tent (1979–1982)
- Showtime Theater (1994–September 2, 2019)
- Various small stores, games/game stands, pavilions, and refreshment buildings

== Awards ==
=== General ===
In 1996, the National Amusement Park Historical Association (NAPHA) recognized Waldameer's 100th operating season with a special plaque and ceremony. In 2008, Paul Nelson was named "Person of the Year" by Amusement Today. In 2021, NAPHA recognized Waldameer's 125th operating season with a commemorative plaque, and ACE Western Pennsylvania recognized then-park manager Steve Gorman with the "Industry Appreciation Award".

In 2024, Nelson posthumously received the "Legend Award" in the Golden Ticket Awards.

=== Ravine Flyer II ===
In 2008, Ravine Flyer II was named "Best New Ride" in Amusement Today's Golden Ticket Awards, and was ranked the 11th best wooden coaster in the world. It has remained in Amusement Today's top 10 best wooden coasters list every year since 2009, peaking at number five in 2016.

In 2025, Ravine Flyer II was voted the title of second-best wooden coaster and fourth-best coaster overall in the United States by the USA Today 10 Best Awards. In 2026, it was voted the title of second-best wooden coaster and fifth-best coaster overall in the United States in the same awards.

=== Other rides ===
Waldameer's two Bill Tracy dark rides, Whacky Shack and Pirate's Cove, have won numerous dark ride awards from Dark Attraction and Funhouse Enthusiasts (DAFE). Both attractions have consistently been ranked in DAFE's top 10 for their respective categories, Classic Dark Ride and Walkthrough. In 2023, the Rocket Blast water coaster slide won "Best New Water Park Ride" in the Golden Ticket Awards.

== Incidents ==
- On July 11, 1904, 18-year-old Frank Woodbridge drowned while swimming on the Waldameer beaches when the life guards were on a dinner break.
- On December 20, 1921, 36 cottages on Waldameer property were destroyed in a fire caused by a strong storm.
- During the late evening hours of August 7, 1938, the Ravine Flyer coaster failed to clear the hill following the dip crossing Peninsula Drive. As the train continued to travel back and forth over Peninsula Drive, passenger Mary Sersch became hysterical. Her brother, 19-year-old Clarence Sersch then rose out of his seat in an attempt to calm her. He lost his balance, which resulted in the fall to his death in the middle of Peninsula Drive. The ride was shut down for further investigation. One investigation into the coaster stated that the ride was condemned and torn down after it was discovered that a locked wheel assembly had caused the train to lose speed over Peninsula Drive, but the park maintains that the ride was cleared of any wrongdoing but was dismantled at the request of then-park owner Alex Moeller's wife, who was distraught over the incident. Ravine Flyer was replaced 70 years later in 2008 by Ravine Flyer II, in which Peninsula Drive was spanned again. The ride's station stood for decades afterwards as a pavilion called Lakeview Grove, directly next to Ravine Flyer II.
- In the fall of 1941, the Hofbrau German Beer Garden caught fire while hosting a company dinner. 11 people were injured, and a 17-year-old waitress was killed when she returned to the burning building to retrieve her purse.
- On May 26, 2014, a man was stabbed before a fight broke out in the park. The victim was taken to a local hospital for treatment and survived.
- On October 23, 2016, a fight broke out at an event being hosted in the Rainbow Gardens dance hall which resulted in shots being fired. Several people were injured, but no one was killed.
- On June 28, 2019, the Chaos ride was going through its usual cycle. At around 1:30 p.m., the ride became stuck upside-down for about two minutes. There were no injuries reported during this incident. The ride was closed for the rest of the day and reopened the following day with the inverting feature temporarily removed. On July 3, the cause of the malfunction was stated to be due to loose wires. The ride returned to its full ride cycle again on July 4 without further issue.
- In the afternoon of April 19, 2020, five individuals broke into Water World while it was closed and rode skateboards through the park and inside several of the water slides, causing thousands of dollars in damages to the slides in the form of chips and scratches. They were reported and taken into custody on park property, and all five were initially charged with third-degree felony-level criminal mischief. All five later agreed to pay a restitution of $10,000 each in return for their charges being lessened to second-degree misdemeanors.
- On May 31, 2021, a fight broke out inside the park at around 6:30 p.m. Seven people were later charged in connection to it.
- On July 11, 2022, a fight broke out inside the park just before 7:00 p.m. One person was hospitalized with a spinal cord injury.
- In the evening of August 17, 2024, the Flying Swings ride failed to slow down as it was brought back to the ground, causing several riders to hit their legs on the fence surrounding the ride. The ride reopened several days later following an inspection and several test cycles without further issue.
- Four break-ins occurred in the evenings of March 7, March 13, April 1, and April 4 of 2026. Four suspects stole tools and a golf cart from the park, and damaged park property. The suspects were later arrested and charged, and the golf cart was returned to the park.

== In popular culture ==
- In 1996, a documentary entitled "Waldameer: 100 Years of Fun" was released by WQLN to celebrate the park's 100th operating season.
- Eight children's books featuring fictional characters who solve mysteries at Waldameer have been released from 2017 onwards, in a series entitled Waldameer Mystery Files. The books were written by David Gorman, son of Steve Gorman (park president and general manager) and grandson of Paul Nelson (owner and operator of the park from 1978 to 2023).
- In May 2026, a documentary entitled "Trolley Park: Great Lakes" was released as a special feature on WQLN to highlight the history of two trolley parks: Waldameer and Seabreeze Amusement Park in Irondequoit, New York.
