= Tom Ridge Environmental Center =

Educational facility in Erie, Pennsylvania

Coordinates: 42.1100°N 80.1540°W

The Tom Ridge Environmental Center

The Tom Ridge Environmental Center is an educational facility on the grounds of Presque Isle State Park in Erie, Pennsylvania, United States. Designed by Wallace, Roberts & Todd Architects, this building received the 2007 President's Award for design-build projects in Delaware and Pennsylvania by the American Society of Landscape Architects.

== History and notable features ==
Named after former Governor of Pennsylvania and U.S. Secretary of Homeland Security Tom Ridge, the center opened on May 26, 2006.

It features 65,000 square feet (6,039 m^{2}) of space including interpretive exhibits highlighting local and regional flora and fauna, as well as information on the human history and culture of the area. The center also has a large-format movie theater, a gift shop, a cafe, a visitors' center, and an observation tower of 75 feet (23 m) that overlooks Lake Erie and Waldameer & Water World. The facility also has five conference rooms and eight laboratories for environmental education and research of supporting organizations, plus the administrative offices of several environmental and conservation groups and agencies.

The center was designed by Wallace, Roberts & Todd Architects, and received the 2007 American Society of Landscape Architects President's Award for design-build projects in Delaware and Pennsylvania.

The parking lot in front of the facility was previously occupied by a drive-in theater, the Peninsula, which opened in 1969 and closed in 2001 (five years before the environmental center opened).

Located next to the parking lot was a small wind turbine constructed in 2007. It was removed after several incidents in which ice chunks were flung from the blades and damaged the roof of the building. This also proposed threats to the public, especially in the parking lot.
