= Eagle's Pursuit =

Upcoming launched roller coaster at Waldameer & Water World

Waldameer & Water World
- Location: Waldameer & Water World
- Status: Under construction
- Opening date: April 2027
- Cost: $15 million

General statistics
- Type: Steel
- Manufacturer: Vekoma
- Designer: Vekoma
- Model: Family Launch Coaster
- Track layout: Terrain
- Lift/launch system: Two LIM launches
- Drop: 60 ft (18 m)
- Length: 1,885 ft (575 m)
- Speed: 46 mph (74 km/h)
- Duration: 0:53
- Capacity: 735 riders per hour
- Restraint style: Lap bars
- Height restriction: 38 in (97 cm)
- Trains: Single train with 10 cars; riders arranged 2 across in a single row for a total of 20 riders per train
- Eagle's Pursuit at RCDB

Eagle's Pursuit is an upcoming steel dual-launched family roller coaster at Waldameer & Water World in Erie, Pennsylvania, United States. It was announced on June 8, 2026, and is scheduled to open in April 2027. It is the most expensive single investment in the park's history. It will be Waldameer's sixth roller coaster and their first launched roller coaster. It was designed by Vekoma.

== Ride experience ==
Upon dispatch, the ride launches out of the station and into a slightly banked, 60 foot (18 m) drop which first curves right and then left, facing Lake Erie. Exiting this drop, the train the train curves to the right and traverses an airtime hill, before turning 180° to travel through a section of track consisting of banks to the left and right. The ride enters another turnaround within the first 180° turn, and travels uphill into the an airtime hill and the second launch. Coming out of the launch, the track turns slightly to the left, right, and left again, before going over two final airtime hills into the brake run. The train then turns 180° again to return to the station.

== Characteristics ==
=== Ride ===
Eagle's Pursuit was designed by Dutch manufacturer Vekoma, and is a launched steel roller coaster with a low thrill level and low height requirement intended to appeal to all ages. The ride will have an elevation change of 80 feet (24 m) and a largest drop of 60 feet (18 m), as well as top speeds of 46 mph (74 km/h). The ride will be 1,885 feet (574 m) long. It will feature two LIM launches, and its layout will traverse property that was previously used by the park as beachfront access in the early 1900s. One ride cycle will last approximately 53 seconds.

The ride was inspired by Big Bear Mountain, a similar roller coaster at Dollywood in Pigeon Forge, Tennessee. The development of Eagle's Pursuit began in 2023.

=== Train ===
The ride has one train, painted white and brown. The lead car is adorned with the ride's logo, featuring a bald eagle, and the sides of the cars are decorated with eagle wings. Passengers are secured by a lap bar. The train has ten cars, each of which carries two passengers in a single row for a total of 20 riders per train.
