= Super shot (ride) =

Type of amusement ride

A Super Shot is a drop tower amusement ride model. The ride is produced in collaboration between A.R.M. Rides and Larson International.

There are several different models of Super Shot available, differing in height. The ride is available both as a permanent installation for amusement parks and as a trailer-mounted installation for traveling fairs. All versions of the ride allow for 12 riders per cycle. The rider vehicle ascends the tower by cable, with passengers facing outwards. When the car reaches the top, it drops rapidly. Before it reaches the ground, it is slowed with magnetic or air-powered brakes.

== Incident ==
On July 26, 2016, a 47-year-old woman was injured while riding a Super Shot in at the Frederick County Fair in Frederick County, Virginia. Her seat had been incorrectly installed and became detached from the ride, causing her to fall 40 feet (12 m).
