= Steel Dragon (Waldameer) =

Steel spinning roller coaster at Waldameer & Water World

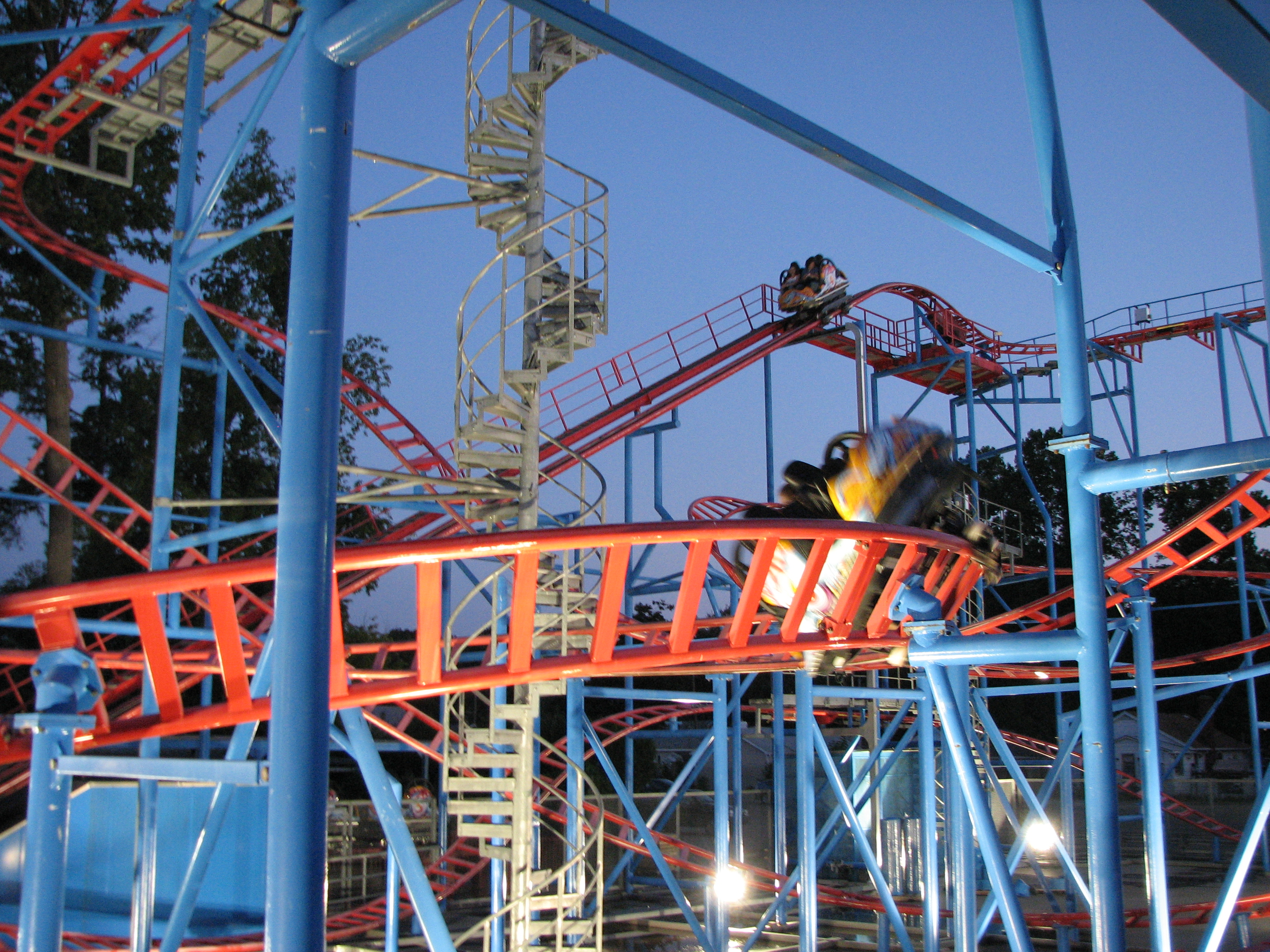

Waldameer & Water World
- Location: Waldameer & Water World
- Coordinates: 42.108140°N 80.158852°W
- Status: Operating
- Opening date: July 2, 2004
- Cost: $4 million

General statistics
- Type: Steel – Spinning
- Manufacturer: Maurer AG
- Designer: Maurer AG
- Model: SC 2000
- Lift/launch system: Chain lift hill
- Height: 50.8 ft (15.5 m)
- Length: 1,391.1 ft (424.0 m)
- Speed: 37.3 mph (60.0 km/h)
- Duration: 1:24
- Max vertical angle: 50°
- Restraint style: Lap bars
- Height restriction: 46 in (117 cm)
- Trains: 8 trains with a single car; riders arranged 2 across in 2 rows for a total of 4 riders per train
- Steel Dragon at RCDB

Steel Dragon is a steel spinning roller coaster located at Waldameer & Water World in Erie, Pennsylvania. It was manufactured by Maurer AG and opened in 2004.

== History ==
Steel Dragon opened to the public on July 2, 2004. It remained in continuous operation from its opening until 2025, when it did not open at the beginning of the season due to the delayed installation of a new control panel. The ride reopened to the public on July 4th, 2025 following the successful installation of the new control system.

== Ride experience ==
Upon dispatch, the car takes a right turn out of the station into the chain lift hill. At the top of the 50.8 foot (15.5 m) lift hill, it turns 90° to face Lake Erie before falling down the largest drop, as the car begins to spin. The ride then hits an 80° bank. It completes two rectangular circuits within itself, featuring various banked turns, drops, and a small helix, before entering the final brake run and returning to the station.

== Characteristics ==
Steel Dragon is a steel spinning coaster of the SC 2000 model from Maurer AG. It is 50.8 feet (15.5 m) tall, 1,391.1 feet (424 m) long, and features top speeds of 37.3 mph (60 km/h). It has banking up to 80°, and a maximum vertical angle of 50°. One ride cycle takes approximately one minute and 24 seconds to complete.

The ride has eight cars. Riders sit two in a row back-to-back in each car, for a total of four riders per car. The park typically runs two to six cars at a time on the ride.
