= 2013 in amusement parks =

This is a list of events and openings related to amusement parks that occurred in 2013. These various lists are not exhaustive.

== Amusement parks ==
=== Opening ===
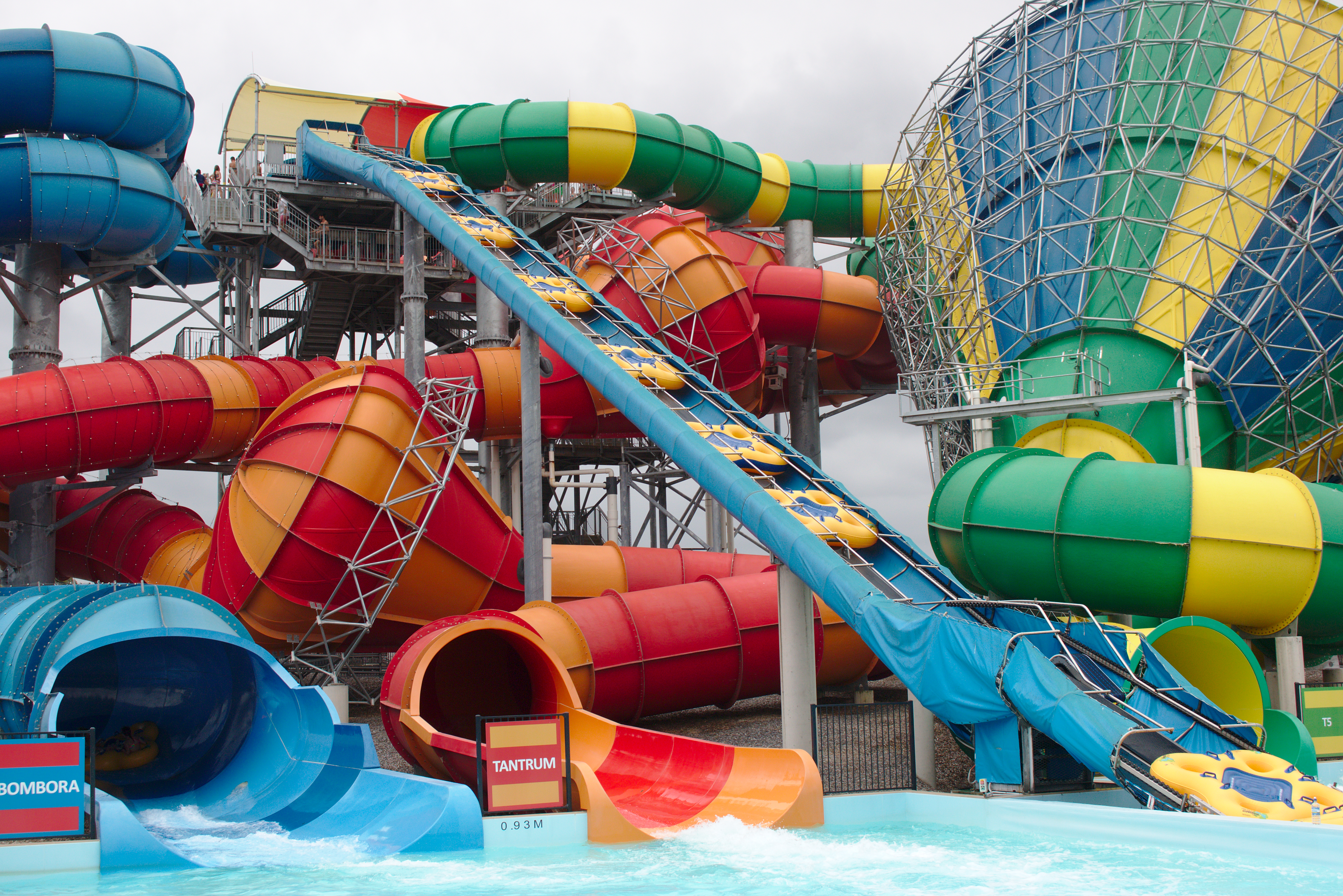
Wet'n'Wild Sydney (now Raging Waters Sydney) opened in December.

- India Adlabs Imagica – April 18
- United States Aquatica San Diego – Spring, to replace the former Knott's Soak City water park
- People's Republic of China Euro Park – August 11
- People's Republic of China Fantawild Dream Park – April 28
- Floraland Continent Park
- Hainan Wenchang Space Theme Park
- Happy Kingdom
- People's Republic of China Happy Valley, Tianjin – July 27
- United Arab Emirates IMG Theme Park
- Indonesia JungLeLand
- Jurassic Dream
- Lanzhou Hengda Chinese Ecological Park
- Nantong Adventure Land
- People's Republic of China Ocean Kingdom
- People's Republic of China Qihe Happy World
- People's Republic of China Sino Wonderland
- Philippines Sky Fun Amusement Park – March 2
- Turkey Vialand
- United States Wet'n'Wild Las Vegas – May
- Australia Wet'n'Wild Sydney – December 12
- United Arab Emirates Yas Waterworld – January 24

=== Change of ownership ===
- Knott's Soak City (Palm Springs) – Cedar Fair Entertainment Company » CNL Lifestyle Properties

=== Birthday ===
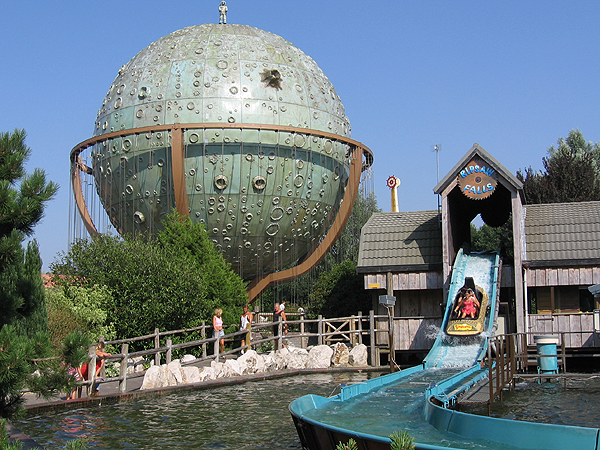
Attractiepark Slagharen celebrated its 50th anniversary in 2013.

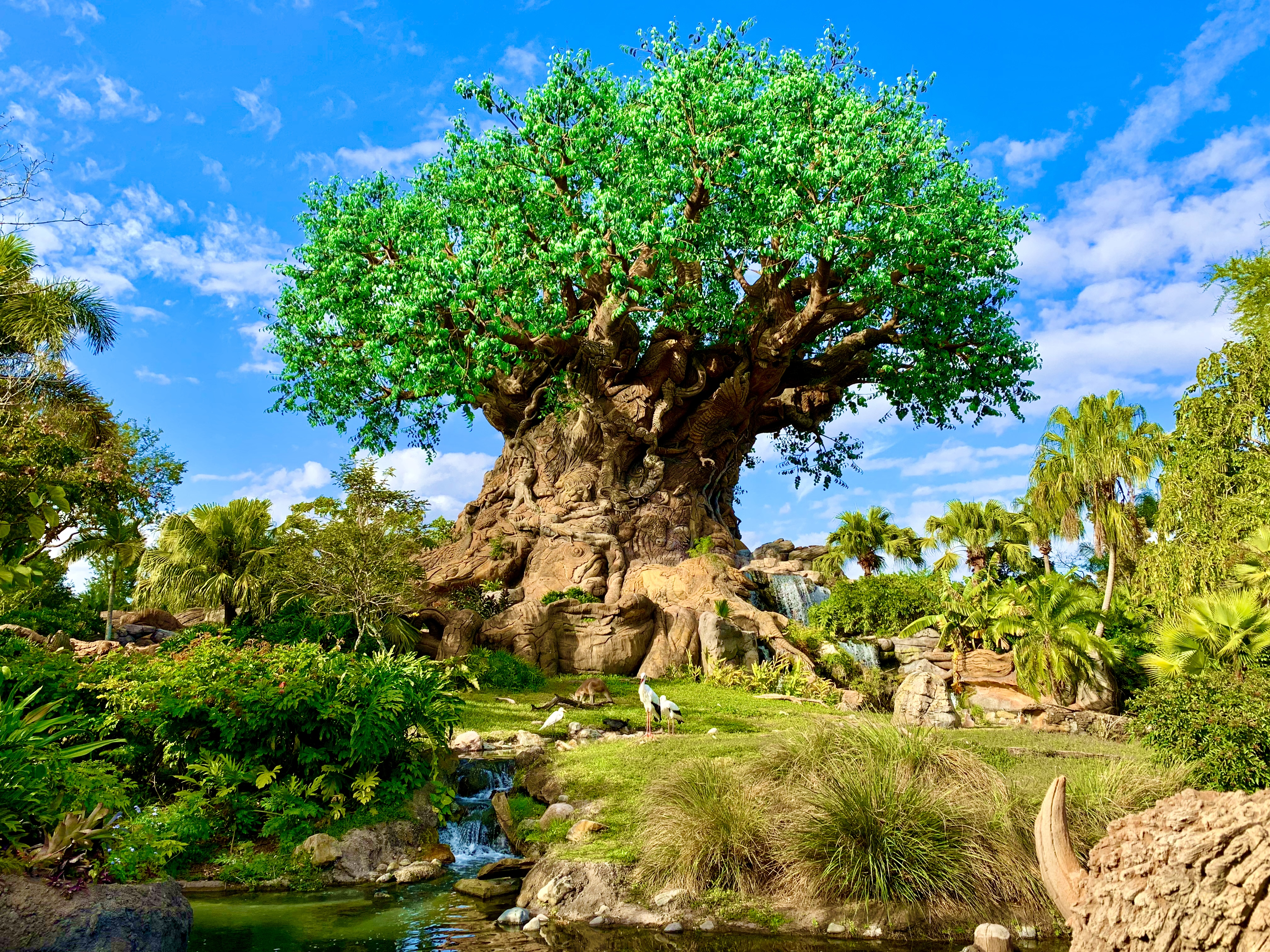
Disney's Animal Kingdom celebrated its 15th anniversary in April.

- United States Aquatica Florida – 5th birthday
- Netherlands Attractiepark Slagharen – 50th birthday
- United States Carowinds – 40th birthday
- United States Disney's Animal Kingdom – 15th birthday
- United States Frontier City – 55th birthday
- Sweden Gröna Lund – 130th birthday
- Germany Heide Park – 35th birthday
- Denmark Legoland Billund – 45th birthday
- England Paultons Park – 30th birthday
- United States SeaWorld San Antonio – 25th birthday
- United States SeaWorld Orlando – 40th birthday
- United States Six Flags America – 40th birthday
- United States Six Flags Discovery Kingdom – 45th birthday
- United States Soak City (Sandusky, Ohio) – 25th birthday
- United States Soak City (Valleyfair) – 30th birthday
- United States Splash Adventure – 15th birthday
- Japan Tokyo Disneyland – 30th birthday
- United States Worlds of Fun – 40th birthday

=== Closed ===
- King Richard's Park – April 14
- Genting Outdoor Theme Park – August 31

== Additions ==
=== Roller coasters ===
==== New ====
Name	Park	Type	Manufacturer	Opened
Abyss	Australia Adventure World	Euro-Fighter roller coaster	Gerstlauer	November 1
Crazy Bird	People's Republic of China Happy Valley, Tianjin	El Loco	S&S Worldwide	December 22
Coast Rider	United States Knott's Berry Farm	Wild Mouse roller coaster	Mack Rides	May 25
Eldorado	Italy Etnaland	Steel roller coaster	S&S Worldwide	April 20
Fjord Flying Dragon	People's Republic of China Happy Valley, Tianjin	Wooden roller coaster	Martin & Vleminckx	July 27
Flying Turns	United States Knoebels Amusement Resort	Bobsled roller coaster	Knoebels Amusement Resort	October 5
Freedom Flyer	United States Fun Spot America	Suspended Family Coaster	Vekoma	June 8
Full Throttle	United States Six Flags Magic Mountain	Launched roller coaster	Premier Rides	June 22
GateKeeper	United States Cedar Point	Wing Coaster	Bolliger & Mabillard	May 11
Gold Striker	United States California's Great America	Wooden roller coaster	Great Coasters International	May 31
Hero	United Kingdom Flamingo Land Resort	Flying roller coaster	Zamperla	July 16
Hip Hop Coaster	Italy Etnaland	Steel roller coaster	Zamperla	April 20
Huracan	Belgium Bellewaerde	Euro-Fighter	Zierer	March 30
Juvelen	Denmark Djurs Sommerland	Launched roller coaster	Intamin	May 4
Karacho	Germany Erlebnispark Tripsdrill	Infinity roller coaster	Gerstlauer	July 10
Loco Motion	United States Steel Pier	Steel roller coaster	SBF Visa Group	Unknown
Nitro	India Adlabs Imagica	Floorless roller coaster	Bolliger & Mabillard	October 15
Orkanen	Denmark Fårup Sommerland	Inverted roller coaster	Vekoma	June 15
Outlaw Run	United States Silver Dollar City	Wooden roller coaster	Rocky Mountain Construction	March 15
Rattenmühle	Austria Familypark Neusiedlersee	Steel roller coaster	Gerstlauer	June 15
The Smiler	England Alton Towers	Infinity roller coaster	Gerstlauer	May 31
Stampbanan	Sweden Liseberg	Steel roller coaster	Preston & Barbieri	April 27
Storm	Italy Etnaland	Megacoaster	Mack Rides	April 20
Storm Coaster	Australia Sea World	Water Coaster	Mack Rides	December 2
Undertow	United States Santa Cruz Beach Boardwalk	Spinning roller coaster	Maurer Söhne	October 19
White Lightning	United States Fun Spot America	Wooden roller coaster	Great Coasters International	June 8

==== Relocated ====
Name	Park	Type	Manufacturer	Opened	Formerly
Blazin' Buckaroo	United States Elitch Gardens	Family roller coaster	E&F Miler Industries	May 4	Marvel Mania at Splash Adventure
Boomerang	United States Six Flags St. Louis	Boomerang roller coaster	Vekoma	June 8	Flashback at Six Flags Over Texas
Insider	Austria Prater	Spinning roller coaster	Maurer Söhne	August 25	Spinning Coaster Maihime at Tokyo Dome City
The Joker	Mexico Six Flags Mexico	Spinning roller coaster	Gerstlauer	March 7	Pandemonium at Six Flags Discovery Kingdom
Sky Spin	Germany Skyline Park	Spinning roller coaster	Maurer Söhne	July 6	Whirlwind at Camelot Theme Park
Wild Kitty	United States Frontier City	Family roller coaster	Allan Herschell Company	April 7	Cactus Coaster at Elitch Gardens
unknown	Brazil Beto Carrero World	Dual-tracked roller coaster	Premier Rides	In Storage	Batman & Robin: The Chiller at Six Flags Great Adventure

==== Refurbished ====
Name	Park	Type	Manufacturer	Opened	Formerly
Hades 360	United States Mt. Olympus Water & Theme Park	Wooden roller coaster	The Gravity Group	May 25	Hades (Note: Hades received new Timberliner trains as well as a barrel roll as part of its transformation into Hades 360.)
Iron Rattler	United States Six Flags Fiesta Texas	Steel roller coaster	Rocky Mountain Construction	May 25	The Rattler (Note: The Rattler was a wooden roller coaster by the Roller Coaster Corporation of America which opened in 1992.)

=== Other attractions ===
==== New ====
Name	Park	Type	Opened
4D Cinema	England Paultons Park	4D Cinema	March 22
Antarctica: Empire of the Penguin	United States SeaWorld Orlando	Dark ride/penguin exhibit	May 24
Aqua Twist	Canada La Ronde	Mack Rides Twist 'N' Splash	June 1
Barnstormer	United States Silverwood	Barnstormer	June 8
Battaglia Navale	Italy Rainbow Magicland	Splash Battle	March 31
Big Wave Racer	United States Six Flags Hurricane Harbor: New Jersey	Multi-lane mat racer	June 21
Bonzai Pipelines	United States Six Flags America; United States Six Flags New England	SplashTacular DownUnder	July 13; June 12
Cirque Dreams Splashtastic	United States Six Flags Discovery Kingdom	Show	May 25
De Magische Vallei	Netherlands Toverland	Themed area	April 26
Demonia	Italy Rainbow Magicland	Horror House	October 5
Dinosaurs Alive!	United States Carowinds; United States Worlds of Fun; United States Valleyfair	Animatronic dinosaur exhibit	March 2 April 20; May 11
Garden of Wonders	People's Republic of China Hong Kong Disneyland	Walkthrough	May 17
Gaudi-Viertel	Germany Erlebnispark Tripsdrill	Indoor playground	March 23
Gunslinger	United States Six Flags Fiesta Texas	Funtime Sling Shot	March 2
Hyena Falls	United States Holiday World & Splashin' Safari	4 inline tube slides	May 10
IgNight — Grand Finale	United States Six Flags Great America	Nighttime show	June 15
Kitty's Tea Party	United States Holiday World & Splashin' Safari	Teacups	May 10
Lakeside Gliders	United States Michigan's Adventure	Flying Scooters	May 22
Legoland Hotel	United States Legoland California	Hotel	April 5
Madagascar Live! It's Circus Time	Germany Heide Park; Italy Gardaland	Live Show	March 23; March 28
Madagascar Live! Operation: Vacation	United States Busch Gardens Tampa Bay; United States SeaWorld San Diego	Live Show	May 18; June 15
Märchenwald (expansion)	Germany Europa-Park	Themed area	March 23
Murmelturm	Germany Erlebnispark Tripsdrill	Mini drop tower	March 23
Music Express	United States Waldameer & Water World	Music Express	May 11
Mystic Manor	People's Republic of China Hong Kong Disneyland	Dark ride	May 17
Pacific Scrambler	United States Knott's Berry Farm	Scrambler	May 29
Planet Snoopy (expansion)	United States Kings Dominion	Themed area	March 29
Reich der Pharaonen	Germany Legoland Deutschland Resort	Themed area	March 23
Safari Off Road Adventure	United States Six Flags Great Adventure	Safari ride	May 25
Screamin' Eagles	United States Great Escape	Flying Scooters	June 6
Seal Harbour	Australia Sea World	Seal and Sea Lion exhibit	January 25
Shoreline Sprayground	United States HersheyPark	Water Play Area	May 25
SkyScreamer	United States Six Flags Over Georgia	Tower swinger	May 24
SpinCycle	United States Silverwood	SBF Visa inverted swing	May 25
Star Tours–The Adventures Continue	Japan Tokyo Disneyland	Motion simulator	May 7
Surfing Safari	United States Noah's Ark Water Park	FlowRider	Unknown
Surfside Glider	United States Knott's Berry Farm	Flying Scooters	May 29
Tail Spin	United States Wild Adventures	Disk'O	March 16
Teenage Mutant Ninja Turtles: License to Drive	Germany Movie Park Germany	Junior driving school	July 4
Tempel X-pedition	Germany Legoland Deutschland Resort	Interactive Dark Ride	March 23
Texas SkyScreamer	United States Six Flags Over Texas	Tower swinger	May 25
Thor's Hammer	Norway Tusenfryd	Motion-based 3D dark ride	June 22
Tsunami Surge	United States Six Flags Hurricane Harbor: Arlington	ProSlide Tornado Wave	June 22
Transformers: The Ride 3D	United States Universal Studios Florida	Dark ride	June 20
Typhoon Twister	United States Six Flags Hurricane Harbor: Arlington; United States Six Flags White Water	ProSlide Cannonbowl; ProSlide Behemothbowl	June 22; May 24
Wacky Wheels	United States Wild Adventures	Teacups	March 16
Wallace & Gromit's Thrill-O-Matic	England Blackpool Pleasure Beach	Dark ride	April 25
Whistlestop Park	United States Six Flags New England	Themed area	April 13
Wickie The Battle	Belgium Plopsaland De Panne	Splash Battle	July
Zombie Evilution	Australia Dreamworld	Laser skirmish	September 13

== Closed attractions and roller coasters ==
Name	Park	Type	Manufacturer	Closed
AVPX	Australia Dreamworld	Laser Tag	Sudden Impact! Entertainment Company	March 31
Crazy Coaster	Australia Luna Park, Melbourne	Spinning roller coaster	Reverchon Industries	Unknown
Galaxi	United States Indiana Beach	Steel roller coaster	S.D.C.	September 2
Giraffica	United States Holiday World & Splashin' Safari	Shoot-the-Chutes ride	Intamin	October 27
Medusa	Mexico Six Flags México	Wooden roller coaster	Custom Coasters International	August 18
Ragin' Cajun	United States Six Flags Great America	Steel roller coaster	Reverchon Industries	October 27
Rim Runner	United States Adventuredome	Shoot-the-Chutes ride	Arrow Dynamics	February 3
Rolling Thunder	United States Six Flags Great Adventure	Dual-tracked wooden roller coaster	William Cobb & Associates	September 8
Ronde de Rondins	France Parc Astérix	Steel roller coaster	Zierer	September
Sandstorm	United States Busch Gardens Tampa Bay	Orbiter	—	June 2
Super Wirbel	Germany Holiday Park	Corkscrew with Bayerncurve	Vekoma	October 31
Timber Ride	Denmark Legoland Billund Resort	Steel roller coaster	Zierer	August 19
Wilde Maus	Germany Freizeit-Land Geiselwind	Wild mouse	Mack Rides	October 16

== Amusement parks in terms of attendance ==
=== Worldwide ===
This section list the top 25 largest amusement parks worldwide in order of annual attendance in 2013.

Rank	Amusement park	Location	2013 Attendance
1	Magic Kingdom at Walt Disney World Resort	Lake Buena Vista, Florida, US	18,588,000
2	Tokyo Disneyland	Tokyo, Japan	17,214,000
3	Disneyland at Disneyland Resort	Anaheim, California, US	16,202,000
4	Tokyo DisneySea	Tokyo, Japan	14,084,000
5	Epcot at Walt Disney World Resort	Lake Buena Vista, Florida, US	11,229,000
6	Disneyland Park at Disneyland Paris	Marne-la-Vallée, France	10,430,000
7	Disney's Animal Kingdom at Walt Disney World Resort	Lake Buena Vista, Florida, US	10,198,000
8	Disney's Hollywood Studios at Walt Disney World Resort	Lake Buena Vista, Florida, US	10,110,000
9	Universal Studios Japan	Osaka, Japan	10,100,000
10	Disney California Adventure at Disneyland Resort	Anaheim, California, US	8,514,000
11	Islands of Adventure at Universal Orlando Resort	Orlando, Florida, US	8,141,000
12	Ocean Park Hong Kong	Hong Kong, China	7,475,000
13	Hong Kong Disneyland	Hong Kong, China	7,400,000
14	Lotte World	Seoul, South Korea	7,400,000
13	Everland	Yongin, Gyeonggi-Do, South Korea	7,303,000
16	Universal Studios Florida at Universal Orlando Resort	Orlando, Florida, US	7,062,000
17	Universal Studios Hollywood	Universal City, California, US	6,148,000
18	Nagashima Spa Land	Kuwana, Japan	5,840,000
19	SeaWorld Orlando	Orlando, Florida, US	5,090,000
20	Europa-Park	Rust, Germany	4,900,000
21	Walt Disney Studios Park at Disneyland Paris	Marne-la-Vallée, France	4,470,000
22	SeaWorld San Diego	San Diego, California, US	4,311,000
23	Tivoli Gardens	Copenhagen, Denmark	4,200,000
24	Efteling	Kaatsheuvel, Netherlands	4,150,000
25	Yokohama Hakkeijima Sea Paradise	Yokohama, Japan	4,149,000

== Poll rankings ==
=== Golden Ticket Awards ===
The Amusement Today Golden Ticket Awards were held at Santa Cruz Beach Boardwalk in Santa Cruz, California.

Category	2013 Recipient	Location
Best New Ride (Amusement Park)	Outlaw Run	Silver Dollar City
Best New Ride (Waterpark)	RiverRush	Dollywood's Splash Country
Best Amusement Park	Cedar Point	Sandusky, Ohio
Best Waterpark	Schlitterbahn	New Braunfels, Texas
Best Children's Park	Idlewild and Soak Zone	Ligonier, Pennsylvania
Best Marine Life Park	SeaWorld Orlando	Orlando, Florida
Best Seaside Park	Santa Cruz Beach Boardwalk	Santa Cruz, California
Best Indoor Waterpark	Schlitterbahn Galveston Island	Galveston, Texas
Friendliest Park	Dollywood	Pigeon Forge, Tennessee
Cleanest Park	Holiday World & Splashin' Safari	Santa Claus, Indiana
Best Shows	Dollywood	Pigeon Forge, Tennessee
Best Food	Dollywood	Pigeon Forge, Tennessee
Best Water Ride (Park)	Dudley Do-Right's Ripsaw Falls	Islands of Adventure
Best Waterpark Ride	Wildebeest	Holiday World & Splashin' Safari
Best Kids' Area	Kings Island	Mason, Ohio
Best Dark Ride	Harry Potter and the Forbidden Journey	Islands of Adventure
Best Outdoor Show Production	Epcot	Orlando, Florida
Best Landscaping	Busch Gardens Williamsburg	Williamsburg, Virginia
Best Halloween Event	Universal Orlando Resort	Orlando, Florida
Best Christmas Event	Dollywood	Pigeon Forge, Tennessee
Best Carousel	Knoebels Amusement Resort	Elysburg, Pennsylvania
Best Indoor Coaster	Revenge of the Mummy	Universal Studios Orlando
Best Funhouse/Walk-Through Attraction	Noah's Ark	Kennywood

Top 10 Steel Roller Coasters
Rank	2013 Recipient	Park	Supplier	Points	Last year
1	Millennium Force	Cedar Point	Intamin	1204	1
2	Bizarro	Six Flags New England	Intamin	1011	2
3	Expedition GeForce	Holiday Park	Intamin	598	6
4	Nitro	Six Flags Great Adventure	B&M	596	3
5	Apollo's Chariot	Busch Gardens Williamsburg	B&M	542	4
6	New Texas Giant	Six Flags Over Texas	Rocky Mountain Construction	512	5
7	Goliath	Six Flags Over Georgia	B&M	494	9
8	Intimidator	Carowinds	B&M	478	7
9	Magnum XL-200	Cedar Point	Arrow	416	8
10	Intimidator 305	Kings Dominion	Intamin	412	12

Top 10 Wooden Roller Coasters
Rank	2013 Recipient	Park	Supplier	Points	Last year
1	Boulder Dash	Lake Compounce	CCI	1333	5
2	El Toro	Six Flags Great Adventure	Intamin	1302	1
3	Phoenix	Knoebels Amusement Resort	PTC/Schmeck	1088	3
4	The Voyage	Holiday World & Splashin' Safari	The Gravity Group	1086	2
5	Thunderhead	Dollywood	GCI	923	4
6	Ravine Flyer II	Waldameer & Water World	The Gravity Group	712	6
7	Outlaw Run	Silver Dollar City	Rocky Mountain Construction	599	-
8	The Beast	Kings Island	KECO	555	7
9	Lightning Racer	Hersheypark	Great Coasters International	364	11
10	Shivering Timbers	Michigan's Adventure	CCI	304	9

=== Best Roller Coaster Poll ===
Mitch Hawker's Best Roller Coaster Poll were held in early 2014 for the previous year.

Top 10 Steel Roller Coasters
Rank	2013 Recipient	Park	Supplier
1	Expedition GeForce	Holiday Park	Intamin
2	New Texas Giant	Six Flags Over Texas	Rocky Mountain Construction
3	Intimidator 305	Kings Dominion	Intamin
4	Bizarro	Six Flags New England	Intamin
5	Skyrush	Hersheypark	Intamin
6	Maverick	Cedar Point	Intamin
7	Kawasemi	Tobu Zoo Park	Intamin
8	Shambhala: Expedición al Himalaya	PortAventura Park	B&M
9	Nemesis	Alton Towers	B&M
10	Iron Rattler	Six Flags Fiesta Texas	Rocky Mountain Construction

Top 10 Wooden Roller Coasters
Rank	2013 Recipient	Park	Supplier
1	El Toro	Six Flags Great Adventure	Intamin
2	T Express	Everland	Intamin
3	Outlaw Run	Silver Dollar City	Rocky Mountain Construction
4	Boulder Dash	Lake Compounce	CCI
5	Phoenix	Knoebels Amusement Resort	PTC/Schmeck
6	Ravine Flyer II	Waldameer & Water World	The Gravity Group
7	The Voyage	Holiday World & Splashin' Safari	The Gravity Group
8	Balder	Liseberg	Intamin
9/10	Dauling Dragon	Happy Valley Wuhan	The Gravity Group

== Records broken ==
Record name	Record attribute	Ride	Amusement Park	Date broken
World's steepest wooden roller coaster	81°	Outlaw Run	Silver Dollar City	March 15
World's tallest roller coaster inversion	170-foot-tall (52 m) dive drop	GateKeeper	Cedar Point	May 11
World's tallest swing ride	400 feet or 120 metres	Texas SkyScreamer	Six Flags Over Texas	May 25
World's tallest vertical loop	160 feet or 49 metres	Full Throttle	Six Flags Magic Mountain	June 22
Most inversions	14	The Smiler	Alton Towers	May 31

== See also ==
- List of roller coaster rankings
- Category:Amusement rides introduced in 2013
- Category:Roller coasters opened in 2013
- Category:Amusement rides closed in 2013
