= Dragon's Fury =

Dragon's Fury may refer to:

- Dragon's Fury, a ride at Chessington World of Adventures, London
- Dragon's Fury, Mega Drive port of pin-ball game Devil's Crush
- Dragon's Fury, fictional faction in the MechWarrior: Dark Age table top war game set in the BattleTech universe
