= Rattlesnake (roller coaster) =

Steel wild mouse roller coaster

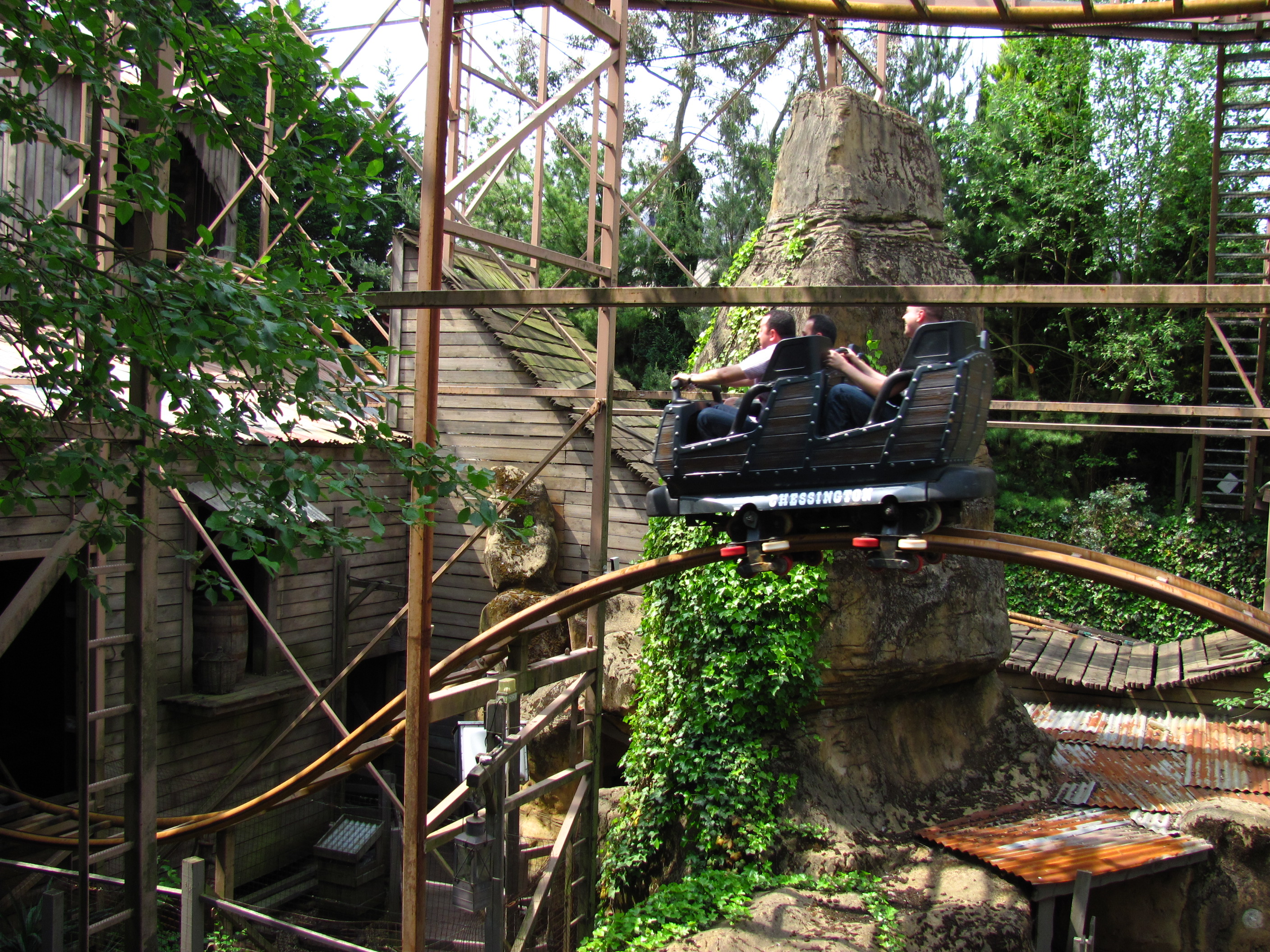

Chessington World of Adventures
- Location: Chessington World of Adventures
- Park section: Forbidden Kingdom
- Coordinates: 51.348662°N 0.317796°W
- Status: Operating
- Opening date: 1998

General statistics
- Type: Steel – Wild Mouse
- Manufacturer: Maurer AG
- Designer: Werner Stengel
- Model: Wilde Maus Classic
- Lift/launch system: Chain lift hill
- Height: 49.25 ft (15.01 m)
- Length: 1,213 ft (370 m)
- Speed: 28 mph (45 km/h)
- Inversions: 0
- Capacity: 950 riders per hour
- Height restriction: 140 cm (4 ft 7 in)
- Trains: 8 trains with a single car; riders arranged 2 across in 2 rows for a total of 4 riders per train
- Reserve and Ride available
- Wheelchair accessible
- Must transfer from wheelchair
- Rattlesnake at RCDB

Rattlesnake is a steel Wild Mouse roller coaster that opened in 1998 at Chessington World of Adventures Resort in Greater London, England. The attraction was designed by Ing.-Büro Stengel GmbH and manufactured by Maurer Söhne as part of their Wilde Maus Classic model line.

== History ==
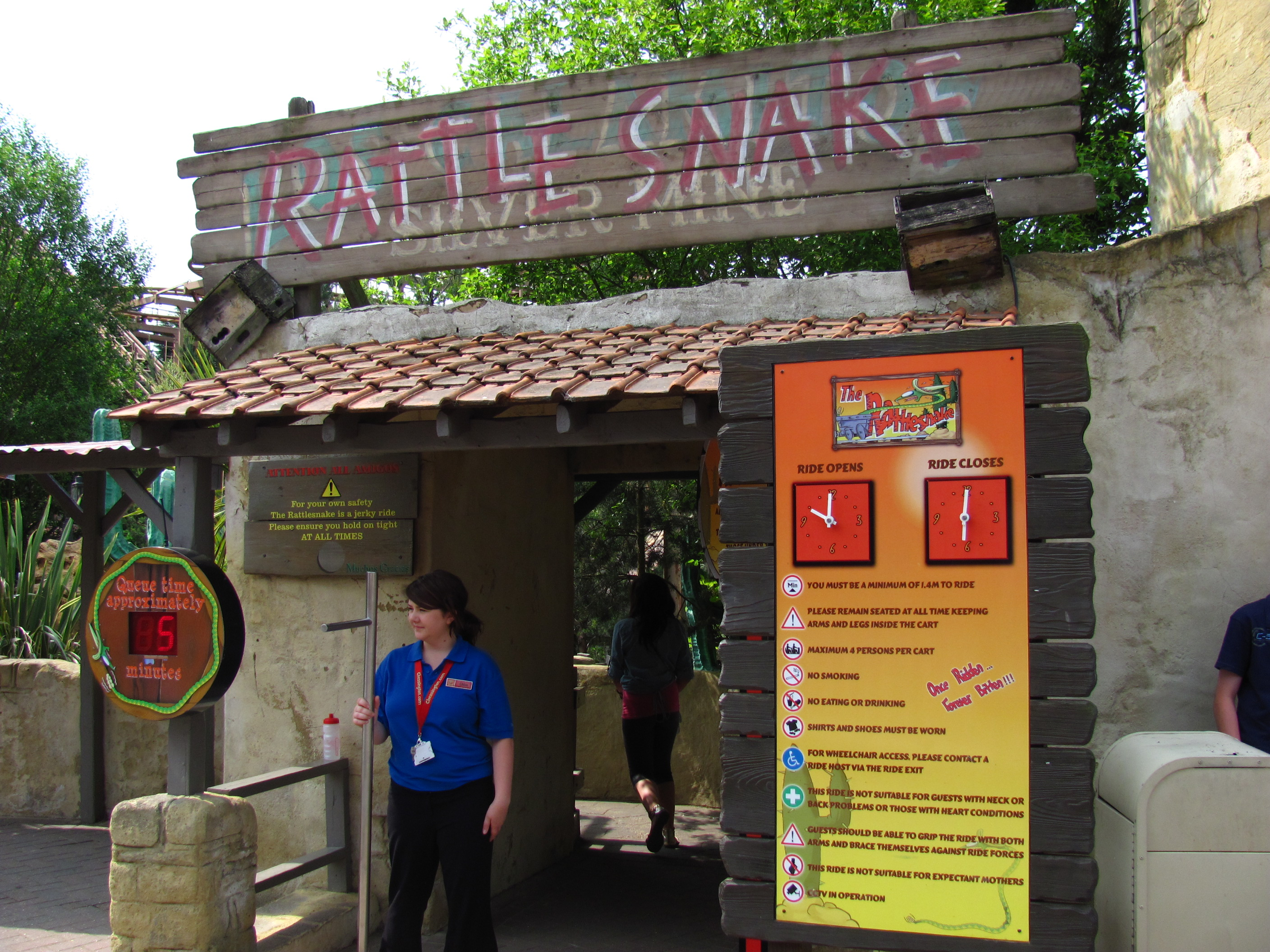
Entrance to the roller coaster.

The ride opened as the theme park's third coaster with a track length is over 1000 feet long. Due to local planning restrictions (a result of the park being on green belt land) the land designated for the ride area was excavated, resulting in the ride being partially submerged below ground level. The layout consists of a chain lift hill, sharp turns and small airtime hills. The installation of the attraction led to the rebranding of the park's Calamity Canyon area as Mexicana.

In June 2015, both Rattlesnake and Dragon's Fury were closed temporarily in response to the 2015 accident on The Smiler at Alton Towers.

In 2026, with the removal of the Mexicana area, Rattlesnake was rethemed and reclassified to the adjacent Forbidden Kingdom area of the park.

== Ride experience ==
The Rattlesnake is themed as an Egyptian mine, featuring ride vehicles designed to resemble mine carts alongside various wooden structures and animated figures.

The ride begins with an ascent up a 45-degree lift hill, after which the car disengages from the chain and enters a series of 180-degree turns along a gradual descent. This is followed by an elongated 270-degree right-hand turn leading into a straight section and a minor incline before the first set of trim brakes. The layout then continues through a 180-degree turn into a significant drop and rise, followed by another 180-degree right-hand turn and a series of airtime hills. The track passes through a themed, damaged structure where the on-ride photo is captured, then concludes with a final 180-degree turn and a concluding airtime hill before entering the magnetic brake run for a sharp halt.

== Restrictions ==
Rattlesnake enforces a height restriction requiring riders to be between 1.4 metres and 1.96 metres tall. The attraction also implements a chest and waist measurement limit of 51 inches; however, regardless of these dimensions, a rider is unable to board if the lap-bar cannot securely fit over their legs to ensure proper restraint. Due to the ride's rough and jerky motion, it is also unsuitable for individuals with pre-existing back or neck problems.

== Gallery ==
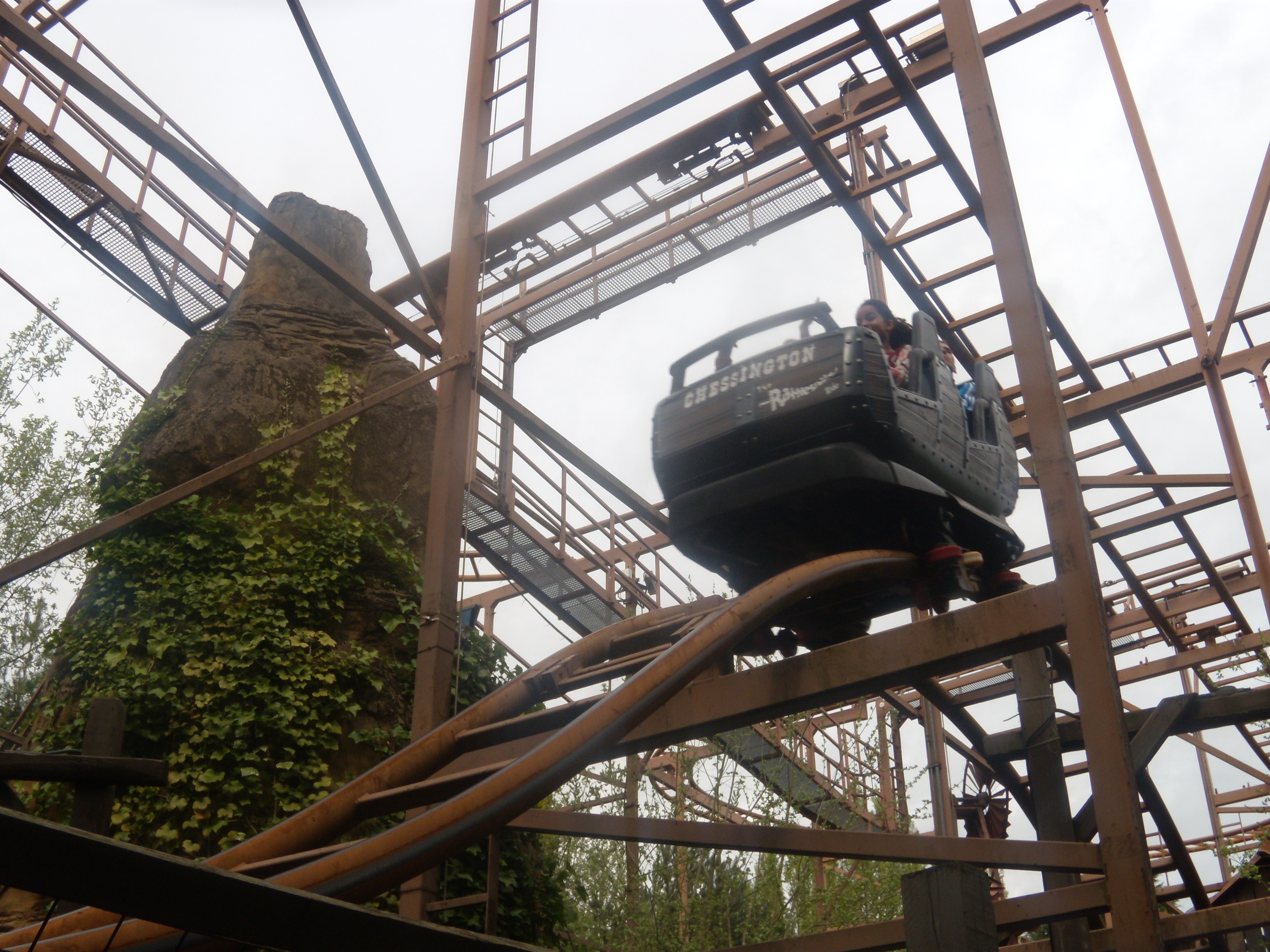
tracks

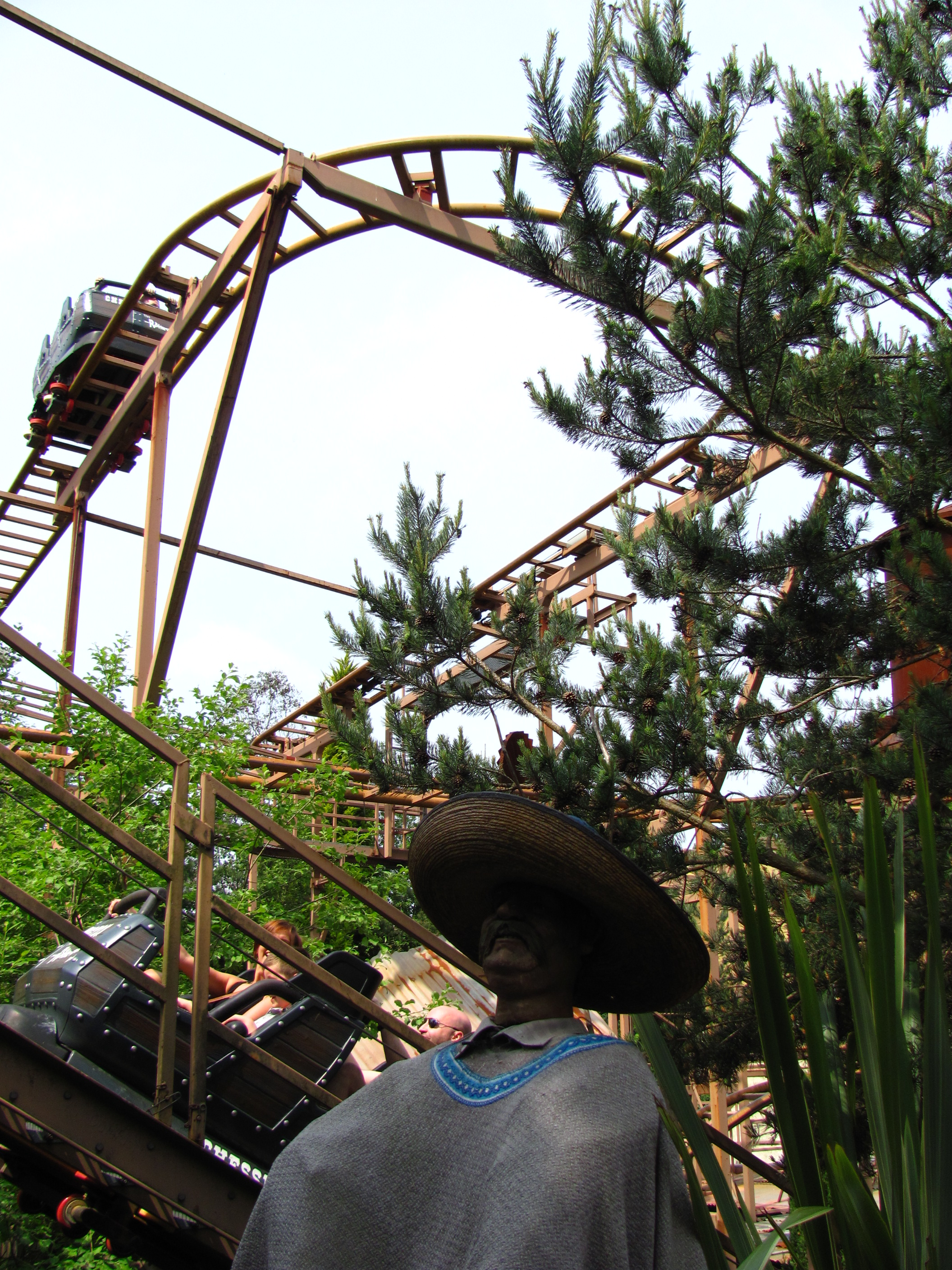
tracks

== See also ==
- Chessington World of Adventures
