= Undertow (roller coaster) =

Steel spinning roller coaster

Santa Cruz Beach Boardwalk
- Location: Santa Cruz Beach Boardwalk
- Coordinates: 36.9644°N 122.0181°W
- Status: Operating
- Soft opening date: October 19, 2013
- Cost: US$5.5 million
- Replaced: Hurricane

General statistics
- Type: Steel – Spinning
- Manufacturer: Maurer AG
- Model: Spinning roller coaster
- Lift/launch system: Chain lift hill
- Height: 50 ft (15 m)
- Length: 1,410 ft (430 m)
- Speed: 40 mph (64 km/h)
- Inversions: 0
- Capacity: 900 riders per hour
- Height restriction: 48 in (122 cm)
- Trains: 7 trains with a single car. Riders are arranged 2 across in 2 rows for a total of 4 riders per train.
- Undertow at RCDB

Undertow is a steel spinning roller coaster at Santa Cruz Beach Boardwalk, built by Mauer AG (Steel construction and roller coaster manufacturer)

== History ==
Santa Cruz Beach Boardwalk announced on March 23, 2012 that Hurricane ride would close in September 2012 and be replaced by a new thrill ride in 2013. On August 27, Undertow was officially announced. Construction started after Hurricane closed on September 3. The ride officially opened to the public on October 19, 2013.

Mauer AG list the ride as a "Spinning Coaster" - Model SC3000.

== See also ==
- 2013 in amusement parks
