= Time Traveler (roller coaster) =

Ride at Silver Dollar City

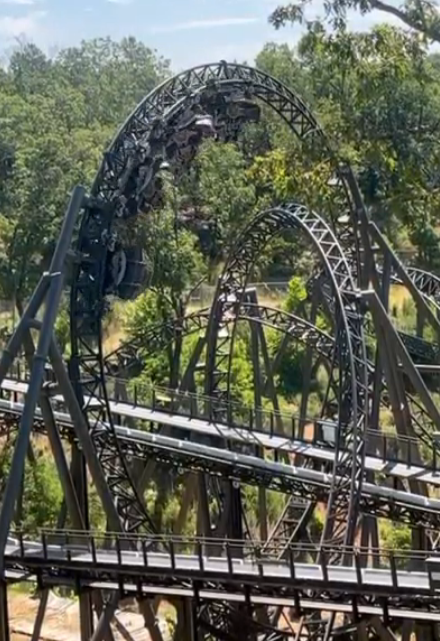
- One of Time Traveler's trains traversing a vertical loop.

Silver Dollar City
- Location: Silver Dollar City
- Park section: Valley Road
- Coordinates: 36.6690°N 93.3377°W
- Status: Operating
- Soft opening date: March 13, 2018
- Opening date: March 14, 2018
- Cost: $26 million ($33.3 million in 2025 dollars)

General statistics
- Type: Steel – Spinning – Launched
- Manufacturer: Mack Rides
- Model: Xtreme Spinning Coaster
- Track layout: Terrain
- Lift/launch system: Two LSM launches
- Height: 100 ft (30 m)
- Drop: 90 ft (27 m)
- Length: 3,020 ft (920 m)
- Speed: 50.3 mph (81.0 km/h)
- Inversions: 3
- Duration: 1:57
- Max vertical angle: 90°
- Height restriction: 51 in (130 cm)
- Trains: 3 trains with 4 cars; riders arranged 2 across in 2 rows for a total of 16 riders per train
- Theme: Time travel
- Website: Official website
- 1st Launch: 0 to 47 mph (0 to 76 km/h) in 3 seconds
- 2nd Launch: 30 to 45 mph (48 to 72 km/h) in 3.5 seconds
- Time Traveler at RCDB

Time Traveler is a spinning roller coaster located at Silver Dollar City in Branson, Missouri. The roller coaster was manufactured by Mack Rides in collaboration with the park's in-house team. The original concept for the roller coaster was conceived from a prototype train tested on another roller coaster, Blue Fire, at Europa-Park in Germany. Time Traveler opened in 2018 and is themed to a fictional backstory about time travel involving characters Charles Henry, a clockmaker, and his daughter. The roller coaster reaches a height of 100 feet (30 m) and a maximum speed of 50.3 mph (81.0 km/h).

Time Traveler was the first installation of the "Xtreme Spinning Coasters" model produced by Mack Rides, which features spinning trains with an eddy current brake located underneath each car to control the rate of spinning. It is currently the only coaster of its type in North America. Upon opening, Time Traveler became the tallest and fastest spinning roller coaster, and the first of its kind to feature three inversions. In 2018, the roller coaster was listed by Amusement Today's annual Golden Ticket Awards as the year's second-best new roller coaster and the 18th-best overall among steel coasters.

== History ==
The original idea and planning for a new attraction—which would become Time Traveler—lasted over four years. In January 2016, while a prototype for a new spinning roller coaster concept was being made by Mack Rides, Jane Cooper, chief operating officer and president of Herschend Family Entertainment, and Brad Thomas, president of attractions for Silver Dollar City, went to test it at Europa-Park where it was featured on the roller coaster Blue Fire. During their first trip, Thomas described the first experience on the prototype they had "like a teacup", but showed promise for the project and design. Thereafter, both Cooper and Thomas made several trips to Europa-Park to discuss and plan the ride's concept with Mack Rides before acquiring the model for the park's new attraction.

From February 2016, Herschend Family Entertainment (owner of Silver Dollar City) filed trademarks with the United States Patent and Trademark Office for multiple names including "Barke", "Time Traveler", and "Top Dog". During one of the several trips in June 2016, the name of the attraction was conceived from Cooper and Thomas' observation of the roller coaster's train design frame. Construction for the roller coaster began in October 2016. On February 15, 2017, photos were taken by the Springfield News-Leader of construction taking place within the park, with a park official acknowledging that footers were in place for a new attraction, but not confirming what it would be.

Silver Dollar City announced "Time Traveler" on August 16, 2017, which upon completion would be the tallest, fastest and longest spinning roller coaster in the world. The ride was announced to be manufactured by Mack Rides at the cost of $26 million to design and build. Among its records, the roller coaster would be the only spinning roller coaster with a double launch, vertical loop, and three inversions. On September 19, 2017, the final piece of track was placed for the attraction, with a park spokesman saying that the ride was about 50 percent complete.

The trains for the ride were officially revealed on November 14, 2017 during the International Association of Amusement Parks and Attractions (IAAPA) Attraction Exposition 2017. The roller coaster's first test runs began on December 14, 2017. In February 2018, Silver Dollar City announced that the roller coaster would open coinciding with the park's seasonal operations. A media day was held on March 13, 2018 for the ride which included 150 guests, with the ride officially opening on March 14, 2018. Originally the ride was to be sponsored by White River Valley Electric, a supplier for the park's electricity. However, the five-year deal was canceled soon after its announcement following concerns from the company's members and board of directors.

Time Traveler experienced maintenance delays early in its tenure, closing often each week for a short period of time due to sensor issues and high temperatures. Excess heat caused the train to run faster, and parameter settings on the ride early on needed to be tweaked. For significant delays, guests would be offered "front of the line" passes to compensate for lost time. The park set attendance records in 2018, attributing in part to the opening of Time Traveler.

== Ride experience ==
=== Theme ===
The roller coaster is themed to the narrative of the fictional character, Charles Henry, and his recent acquisition of the family clockmaker business. Henry was inspired by the science fiction works of Jules Verne. He set out tinkering with the idea of making the world better through the invention of time travel. In accordance with the phrase "dream big, do good" created for the ride, Henry, along with his daughter Emmaline, went on to create the time-traveling device that would highlight human abilities and provide the best decisions for humanity through the alteration of time. The motto for the attraction was used for marketing by the park to highlight individual accomplishments in the community connected to the park's surrounding location, similar to their previous attraction, Outlaw Run, which honors law enforcement through its story.

=== Queue area ===
Located in the Valley Road section of the park, the main street was reconfigured to construct new buildings for the area, which included restaurants. The station of the roller coaster consists of a three-story building that displays the narrative of Charles Henry and his clock factory. The first story of the queue building consists of the factory's storage area, with information asking guests to become volunteer employees of the business. The second story exhibits the company's offices and shows the experimentation of the factory's clock components. The third story progresses the narrative of Henry, leading to the revelation of his time-traveling device, by which riders would experience his invention. The ride's theming throughout the queue area was constructed by the Weber Group, while the musical score was created by John Presley.

=== Layout ===
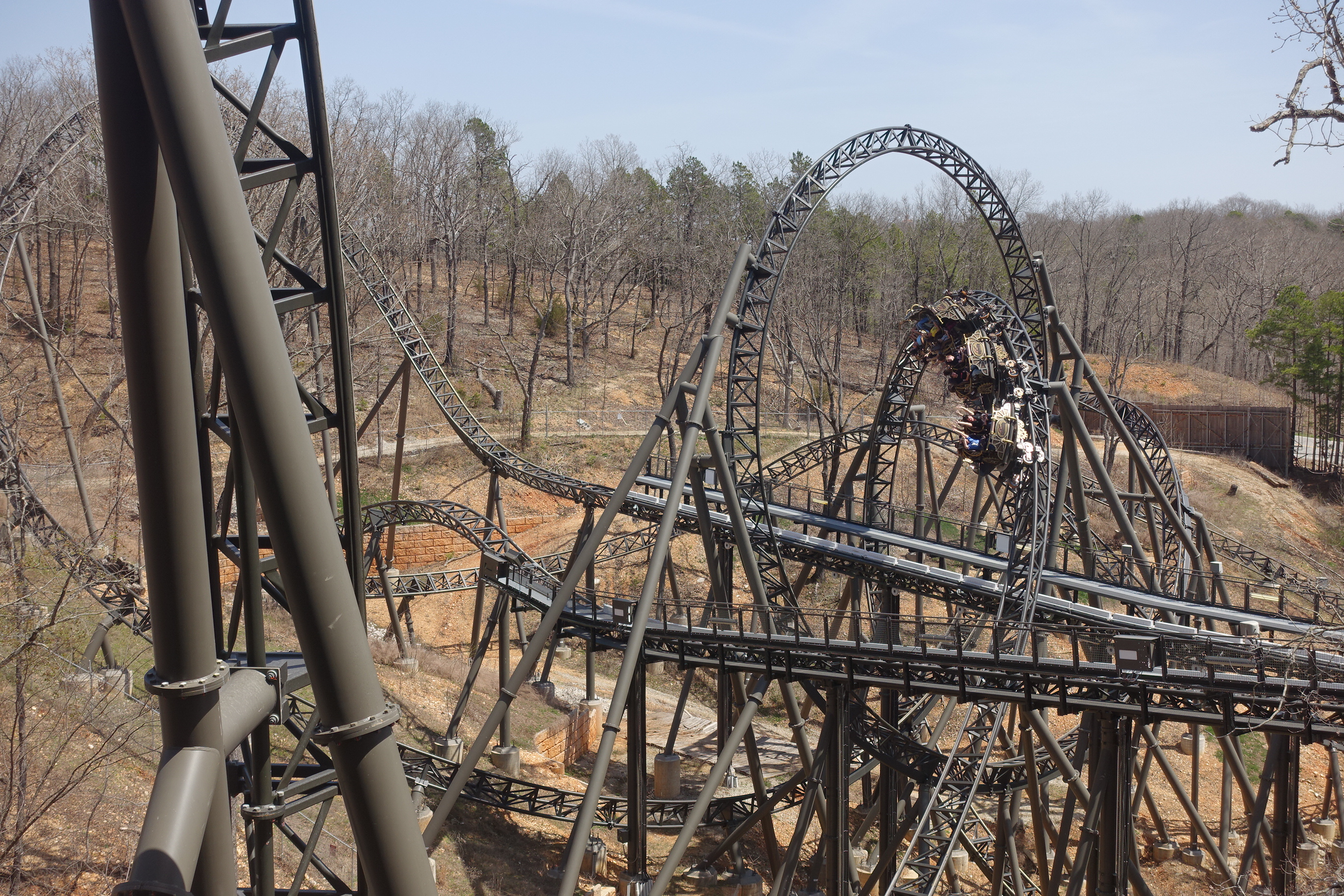
Time Traveler traversing its layout

After the front gates open, the trains leave the station and head into its maximum vertical angle drop of 90-degrees. Descending the 90 foot (27 m) drop at its maximum speed of 50.3 miles per hour (81.0 km/h), the trains enter a dive loop, head upwards into a left banked turn and then a right-banked U-turn. Next, the trains enter the first linear synchronous motor (LSM) launch section where they stop momentarily before accelerating to 47 miles per hour (76 km/h) in 3 seconds. The trains then enter a banked left horseshoe before continuing down left into the 95 foot (29 m) vertical loop. Immediately after, the trains follow upwards into a left-banked turn and subsequently head downward into a right-banked curve where it transitions into a zero-gravity roll. The trains after traverse into another left-banked turn upwards before dipping down into the second LSM launch going from 30 miles per hour (48 km/h) to 45 miles per hour (72 km/h) in 3.5 seconds. Following the launch, the trains head up into an overbanked turn to the right before heading towards a left-banked turn and into the final brake run where the train makes a right U-turn back into the station. During the brake run, speakers alongside the track play audio of Emmaline excitedly announcing the experiment's success to her father. One cycle of the ride takes about two minutes.

== Characteristics ==
=== Track ===
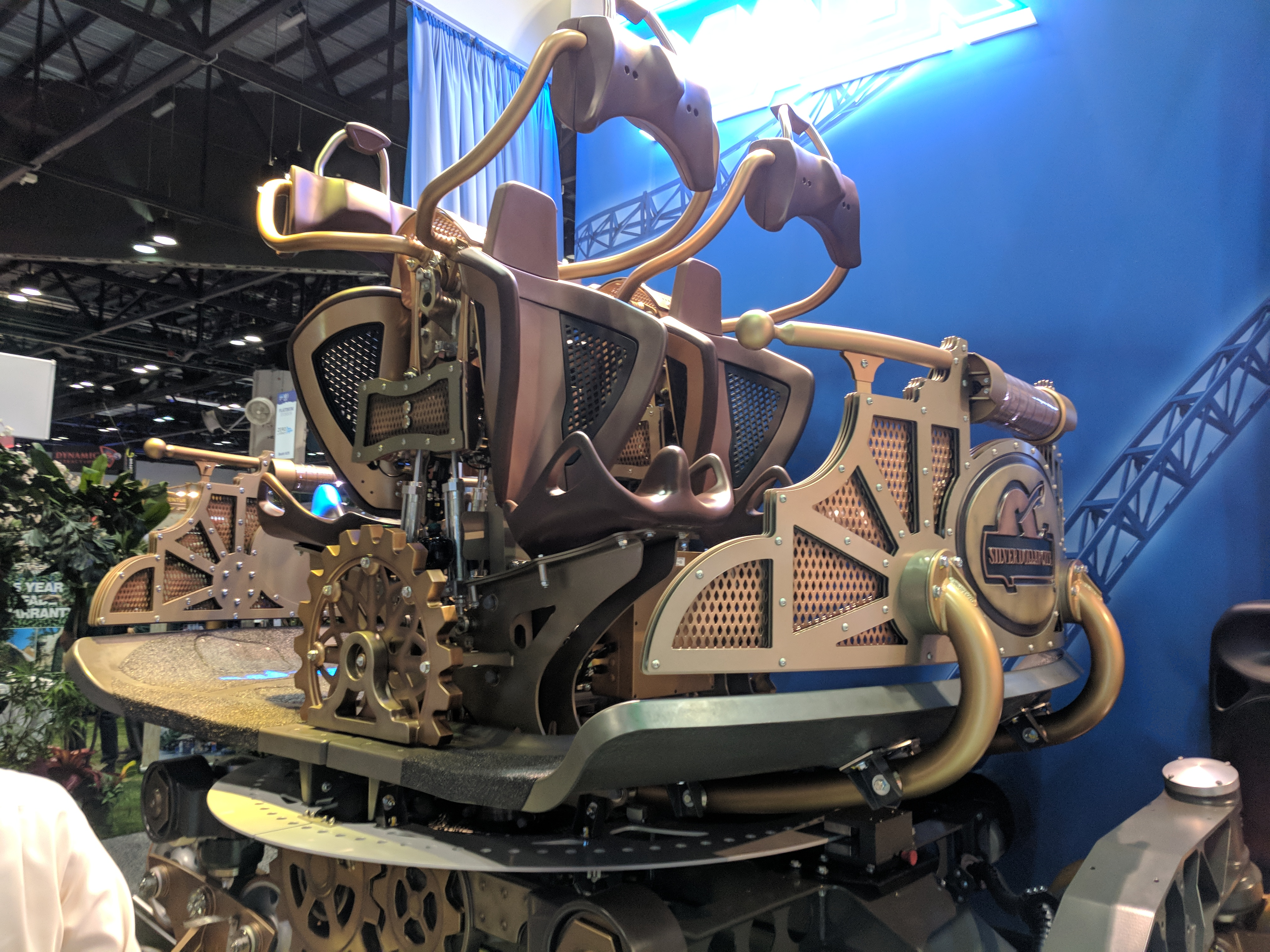
The car for Time Traveler at the Mack Rides booth at IAAPA IAE 2017

The steel tubular track is 3,020 feet (920 m) long and reaches a maximum height of 100 feet (30 m). Unlike conventional roller coasters, Time Traveler doesn't have a lift hill because it enters the course's layout after the initial drop out of the station because of the mountainous terrain. The layout was manufactured, developed, and designed by Mack Rides. The track for the ride is colored olive with the supports colored mocha to coincide with the steampunk color palette. Throughout the layout, the ride crosses over itself fourteen times.

=== Trains ===
Time Traveler operates with three trains, each with four cars that are arranged two across in two rows seating back-to-back, allowing for sixteen riders per train. The cars of the trains are brass-colored, themed with various cogs, gears, and "industrial components". Riders are required to be at least 51 inches (130 cm) tall to ride. The ride is the first "Xtreme Spinning Coaster" model that was produced by Mack Rides, which introduced a free-spinning car that is controlled by magnetic brakes.

== Ride mechanics ==
A diagram of how the disc eddy current brake functions

The train model features unique mechanics different from that of traditional spinning roller coasters. Each of the trains have an eddy current brake situated under the roller coaster's car. When the roller coaster's metallic disc, located on the upper part of the car, passes through the locked brake, it acts as a conductive surface assisting in rotating the car frame as well as slowing the rotation. The eddy brake can be tightened or loosened to adjust the rotation of the roller coaster's car. The trains feature a power rail system to align the roller coaster's cars as they are stationary in the brake run returning to the station, which in addition works as a charger for the on-ride decorated lights on the hand railings located in front of the riders. A busbar located under the ride's train conveys data from the cars to the operator's control systems. The lap bar restraints automatically lower on each train and are locked into place by hydraulic cylinders, which are checked by ride attendants and operators. Steel bristles are additionally located near each of the car's wheels to release electric charges a train may produce and hinder electronics on them.

== Records ==
When the roller coaster opened in 2018, it became the fastest and tallest full circuit spinning roller coaster. Although not a full circuit spinning roller coaster, Big Air located at E-DA Theme Park would be the fastest and tallest spinning roller coaster. In addition, the coaster became the first spinning roller coaster in the world to have three inversions, surpassing Gekion Live Coaster located at Tokyo Joypolis, which only has one inversion.

== Reception ==
Time Traveler was well received among its critics and guests. Arthur Levine of USA Today praised the ride for its use of magnetic brakes to control the spinning of the ride, stating that the ride was "thrilling, but it’s not in the same league as some of the more extreme non-spinning coasters out there". He also expressed that it did distinguish itself from other roller coasters because of its "mild spinning", launches, and smoothness. Bailey Strohl of KTTS said, "Each ride is unlike the last, with each car offering a 360-degree controlled spin that delivers high dimension", stating it bore a new ride every time. Matt Meltzer of Thrillist described the ride as comfortable and non-nauseating, saying that guests would be "screaming through a giant grin that’s impossible to wipe off until the ride stops." He further remarked that a back-seat ride would be more worth than a front-seat ride because of the clear views of the landscape.

James Rao of Theme Park Insider commented that the roller coaster provided a smooth and comfortable ride from start to finish being "another coaster addition that complements Silver Dollar City’s hilly terrain and provides a unique adventure in an already amazing park." He also commented that the ride, although shorter in length and time from other roller coasters, made up through its pacing and elements. Guests from the American Coaster Enthusiast (ACE) conference hosted at the park remarked positively of its spinning mechanics, theming, and ride vehicle design.

=== Awards ===
Golden Ticket Awards: Best New Ride for 2018
Ranking	2

Golden Ticket Awards: Top steel Roller Coasters
Year									1998	1999
Ranking									–	–
Year	2000	2001	2002	2003	2004	2005	2006	2007	2008	2009
Ranking	–	–	–	–	–	–	–	–	–	–
Year	2010	2011	2012	2013	2014	2015	2016	2017	2018	2019
Ranking	–	–	–	–	–	–	–	–	18	22
Year	2020	2021	2022	2023	2024	2025	2026			
Ranking	N/A	26 (tie)	22	22	30 (tie)	29	33			

== See also ==
- 2018 in amusement parks
- Cobra's Curse, a similar Mack Rides spinning roller coaster with modified spinning trains
- The Ride to Happiness, another Xtreme Spinning Coaster model
