= Fiorano GT Challenge =

Steel roller coaster at Ferrari World

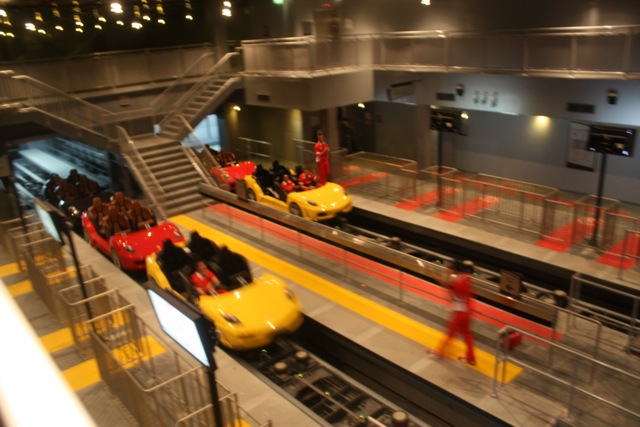
- Fiorano GT Challenge's station

Ferrari World
- Coordinates: 24°29′11.08″N 54°36′15.28″E
- Status: Operating
- Opening date: November 4, 2010

General statistics
- Type: Steel – Launched – Dueling
- Manufacturer: Maurer AG
- Designer: Jack Rouse Associates
Length	3,543 ft (1,079.9 m)	3,543 ft (1,079.9 m)
Speed	59 mph (95.0 km/h)	59 mph (95.0 km/h)
Inversions	0	0
G-force	1.5	1.5
- Height restriction: 51 in (130 cm)
- Trains: 4 trains with 3 cars. Riders are arranged 2 across in 2 rows for a total of 12 riders per train.
- Fiorano GT Challenge at RCDB; Pictures of Fiorano GT Challenge at RCDB

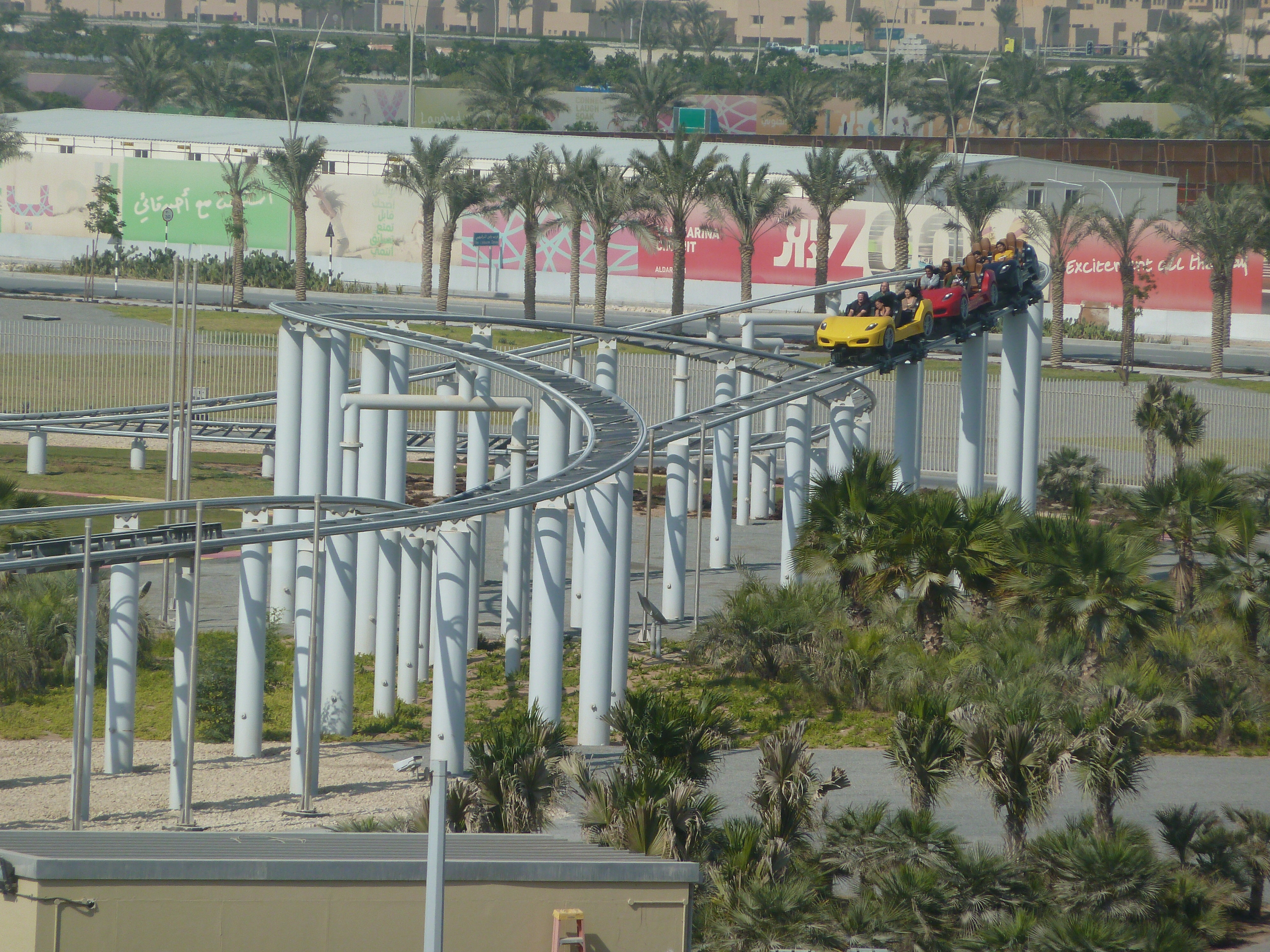
Fiorano GT Challenge Roller Coaster

Fiorano GT Challenge is a steel dueling roller coaster at Ferrari World in Abu Dhabi, United Arab Emirates. The roller coaster features two 1.08-kilometre-long (0.67 mi) tracks, each of which has four LSM launches and four magnetic brake sections, designed to emulate the twisting, head-to-head varying speeds and accelerations of GT racing. Power for the ride system is provided via two flywheel motor generator sets, isolating the surge requirements of the launches from the electrical grid. The trains' 3 cars are modeled after the styling of Ferrari F430 Spiders.
