= The Ride to Happiness =

Steel spinning roller coaster at Plopsaland

Ride to Happiness
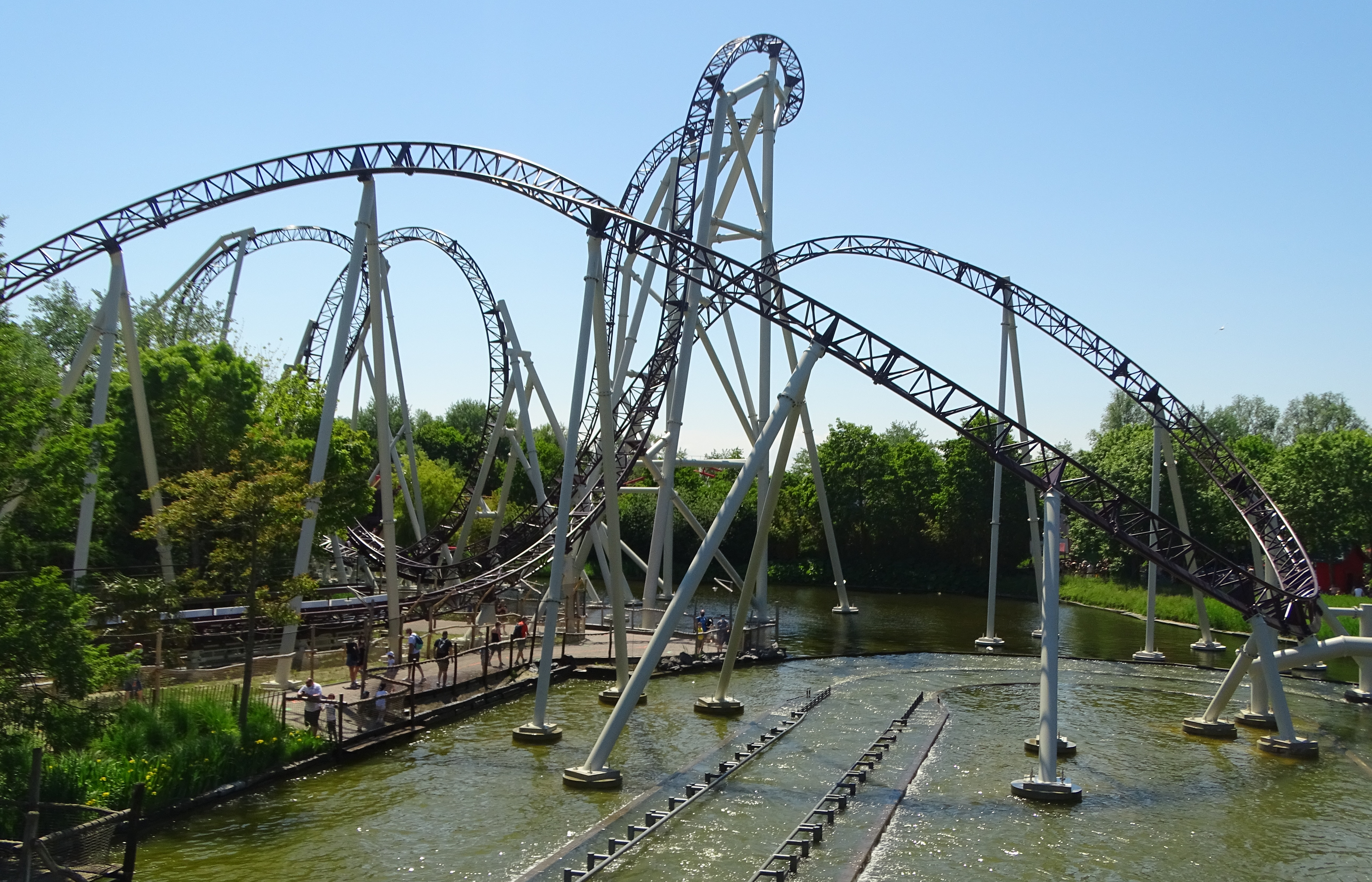

Plopsaland Belgium
- Location: Plopsaland Belgium
- Coordinates: 51.080963°N 2.598853°E
- Status: Operating
- Opening date: 1 July 2021
- Cost: €17,500,000

General statistics
- Type: Steel – Spinning – Launched
- Manufacturer: Mack Rides
- Model: Xtreme Spinning Coaster
- Lift/launch system: Two LSM launches
- Height: 108.3 ft (33.0 m)
- Length: 3,018.4 ft (920.0 m)
- Speed: 55.9 mph (90.0 km/h)
- Inversions: 6
- Capacity: 700-800 riders per hour
- Height restriction: 130 cm (4 ft 3 in)
- Trains: 2 trains with 4 cars; riders arranged 2 across in 2 rows for a total of 16 riders per train
- Theme: Tomorrowland
- Website: Official website
- Ride to Happiness at RCDB

The Ride to Happiness is a steel spinning roller coaster located at Plopsaland Belgium in Adinkerke, Belgium. It is Europe's first Mack Rides Xtreme Spinning Coaster, and holds the record for the most inversions on a spinning coaster. The attraction is themed to the world-famous Tomorrowland electronic dance music festival, annually held in Boom, Belgium.

== History ==
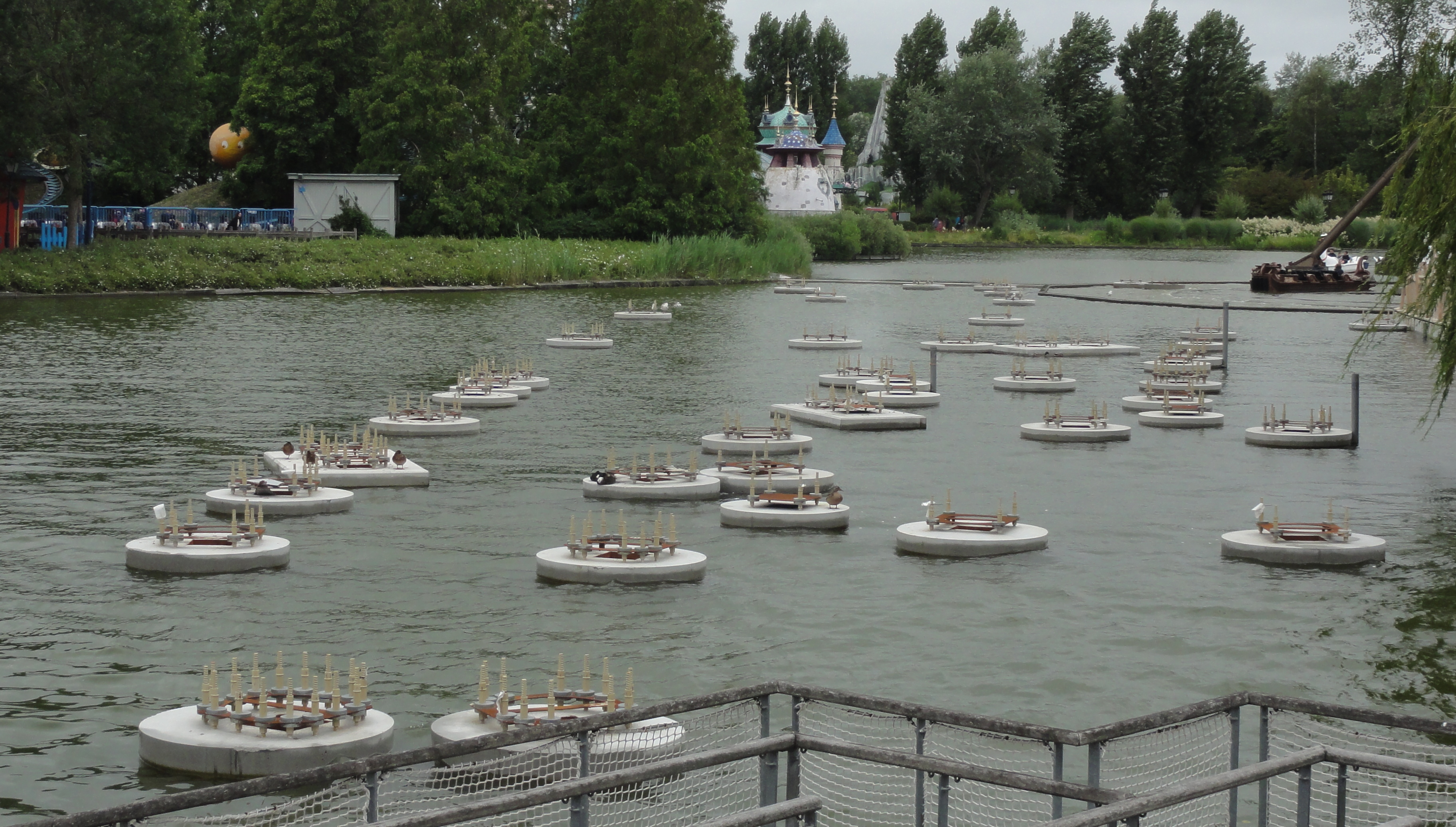
Footers on the pond in July 2020

Reports first emerged in August 2019 that—amid increasing competition from Belgian theme parks—Plopsaland was looking into constructing a major new spinning coaster from Mack Rides, likely to be installed for the 2022 season. This backed up earlier reports that park director Steve Van den Kerkhof had been spotted inspecting the Time Traveler spinning coaster at Silver Dollar City in the U.S. state of Missouri. On 24 September Van den Kerkhof unveiled plans for the attraction under the working title Robo-Spinner, confirming that it would indeed be a Mack Rides Xtreme Spinning Coaster. The coaster was said at the time to represent an investment of €15,000,000 and had been pushed up towards a 2021 opening. Land clearing began in the fall of 2019.

On 21 December 2019 Plopsaland released an official animated rendering of the Robo-Spinner, which would feature five inversions and two launches. Under the new working title Time Traveler, the support footers were completed over the spring and summer of 2020, and ride track first began to arrive on-site in October 2020. Vertical construction commenced in the fall, helmed by attraction construction firm RCS GmbH, and the coaster's track was completed on 17 December 2020.

On 15 January 2021 Plopsaland unveiled the ride's name and theme; The Ride to Happiness, themed to the annual Tomorrowland electronic dance music festival held in Boom, Belgium. The ride's trains were delivered to the park on 11 March. The Ride to Happiness began testing later that month, and in early April, Van den Kerkhof became one of the coaster's first human test riders. The Ride to Happiness began its soft-opening period on 1 July, and held its grand opening ceremony on 21 July 2021.

== Ride experience ==
The ride starts with a slow jo-jo roll out of the station, leading directly into a standstill on the first launch. After a moment's hesitation, the train is then launched up a steep incline to a peak height of 108.3 feet (33.0 m). Riders navigate an outwards-banked 90° left-hand turn before plunging into a vertical drop over the park pond, which leads to the coaster's signature pair of inversions; a banana roll and a vertical loop. The train passes through a zero-g roll and a pair of banked turns overtop the Supersplash water coaster attraction before entering the second launch. The train navigates an airtime hill mid-launch before soaring up into a double-inverting dive loop (also known as a flying snake dive). Another airtime hill is traversed, followed by a turnaround and another airtime hill before popping up into the brake run. A final 180° turn to the left leads back into the station. The train's individual cars spin freely throughout the ride.

== Characteristics ==
=== Statistics ===
The Ride to Happiness is 108.3 feet (33.0 m) tall, 3,018.4 feet (920.0 m) long, and reaches a top speed of 55.9 mph (90.0 km/h) throughout the ride. The coaster runs two trains, each of which has four cars that seat four riders in two rows of two, for an occupancy of 16 riders per train. The layout features two linear synchronous motor (LSM) launches and five inversions (6 inversions if the double inverting dive loop is counted twice), holding the world record for most inversions on a spinning coaster.

=== Model ===
The Ride to Happiness is a Mack Rides Xtreme Spinning Coaster, which is a larger spinning coaster model capable of performing launches and inversions. Prior to its opening, the first and only other Xtreme Spinning Coaster was Time Traveler at Silver Dollar City in Branson, Missouri, of the United States. The model had first been placed on the market in 2016, and Time Traveler made its world premiere in 2018, setting several spinning coaster records in the process.

=== Theme ===
The Ride to Happiness is themed to the world-renowned Tomorrowland music festival. The theming elements were created by the Plopsaland and Tomorrowland creative groups. A soundtrack based on the composer Hans Zimmer's Tomorrowland Hymn was also created exclusively for the park which plays on board the ride.

== Train mechanics ==
A diagram of how the disc eddy current brake functions

The Xtreme Spinning Coaster train features a different set of mechanics from that of traditional spinning roller coasters. Each of the trains have an eddy current brake situated under the coaster's car. When the roller coaster's metallic disc, located on the upper part of the car, passes through the locked brake, it acts as a conductive surface assisting in rotating the car frame as well as slowing its rotation. The eddy brake can be tightened or loosened to adjust the rotation of the roller coaster's car. The trains feature a power rail system to align the roller coaster's cars in a specific direction, which is activated when the trains are returning to the station. A busbar located under the ride's train conveys data from the cars to the operator's control systems. In addition, riders are restrained by lap bars, which are locked into place using hydraulic cylinders.

== Incidents ==
On 19 February 2022, at 5:30 pm CET, a train became stuck at the roller coaster's highest point 32 metres (105 ft) above the ground, with 9 riders on board. Complications arose with the rescue process on account of leftover Storm Eunice winds and the firefighter's short ladders. The stranded riders were evacuated by crane between 9:30 and 11:30 pm. Ride to Happiness reopened from the incident on 27 February 2022. The park subsequently installed a set of motorized tires on the affected track in March 2023 to prevent a repeat incident.

== Reception ==
Golden Ticket Awards: Top steel Roller Coasters
Year									1998	1999
Ranking									–	–
Year	2000	2001	2002	2003	2004	2005	2006	2007	2008	2009
Ranking	–	–	–	–	–	–	–	–	–	–
Year	2010	2011	2012	2013	2014	2015	2016	2017	2018	2019
Ranking	–	–	–	–	–	–	–	–	–	–
Year	2020	2021	2022	2023	2024	2025	2026			
Ranking	N/A	–	39	31	7	5	5			

Category	Ranking	Ref.
Golden Ticket Award for Best New Attraction Installation of 2021	5	
