= Spider (roller coaster) =

Roller coaster in Farmington, Utah

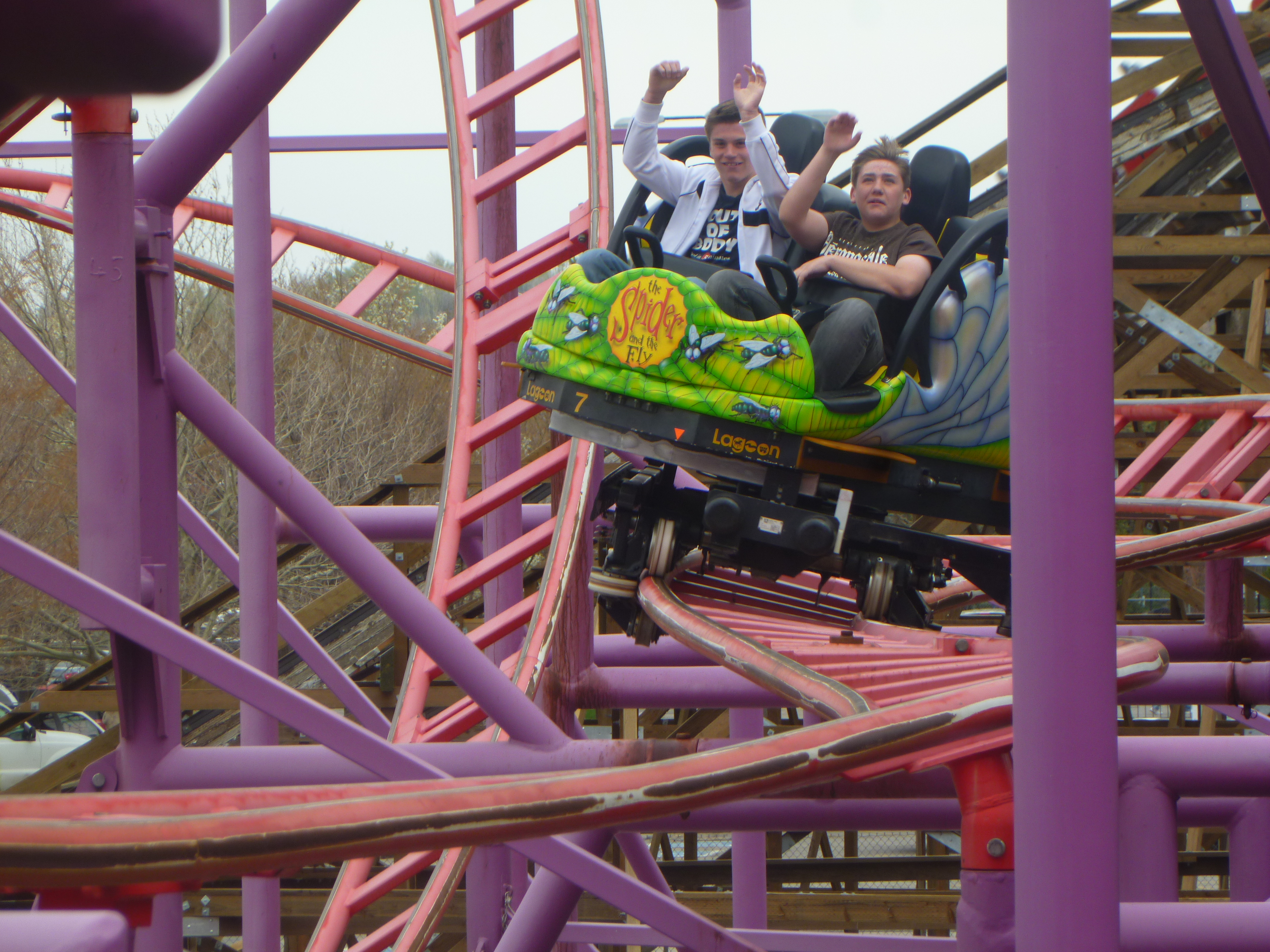

Lagoon
- Location: Lagoon
- Coordinates: 40°59′04″N 111°53′42″W
- Status: Operating
- Opening date: April 2003
- Cost: USD 3,000,000

General statistics
- Type: Steel – Spinning
- Manufacturer: Maurer AG
- Model: Xtended SC 2000
- Height: 50.83 ft (15.49 m)
- Length: 1,391.08 ft (424.00 m)
- Speed: 37.3 mph (60.0 km/h)
- Inversions: 0
- Duration: 1:10
- Max vertical angle: 50°
- Capacity: 930 riders per hour
- Height restriction: 46 in (117 cm)
- Trains: 8 trains with a single car. Riders are arranged 2 across in 2 rows for a total of 4 riders per train.
- Spider at RCDB

Spider is a steel spinning roller coaster built by German ride manufacturer Maurer Söhne. The ride is located at Lagoon Amusement Park in Farmington, Utah. Spider was installed at Lagoon in 2003. Spider features spinning ride vehicles that can seat two sets of two passengers, facing in opposite directions. The vehicles feature the name of "The Spider and the Fly", as that was the coaster's original name.

In the 2016 season, Spider was repainted and the cement below the coaster was replaced. Its track and supports were repainted red and black as opposed to their prior colors of pink and purple.
