= Spinball Whizzer =

Steel spinning roller coaster

- Previously known as Sonic Spinball (2010–2015)

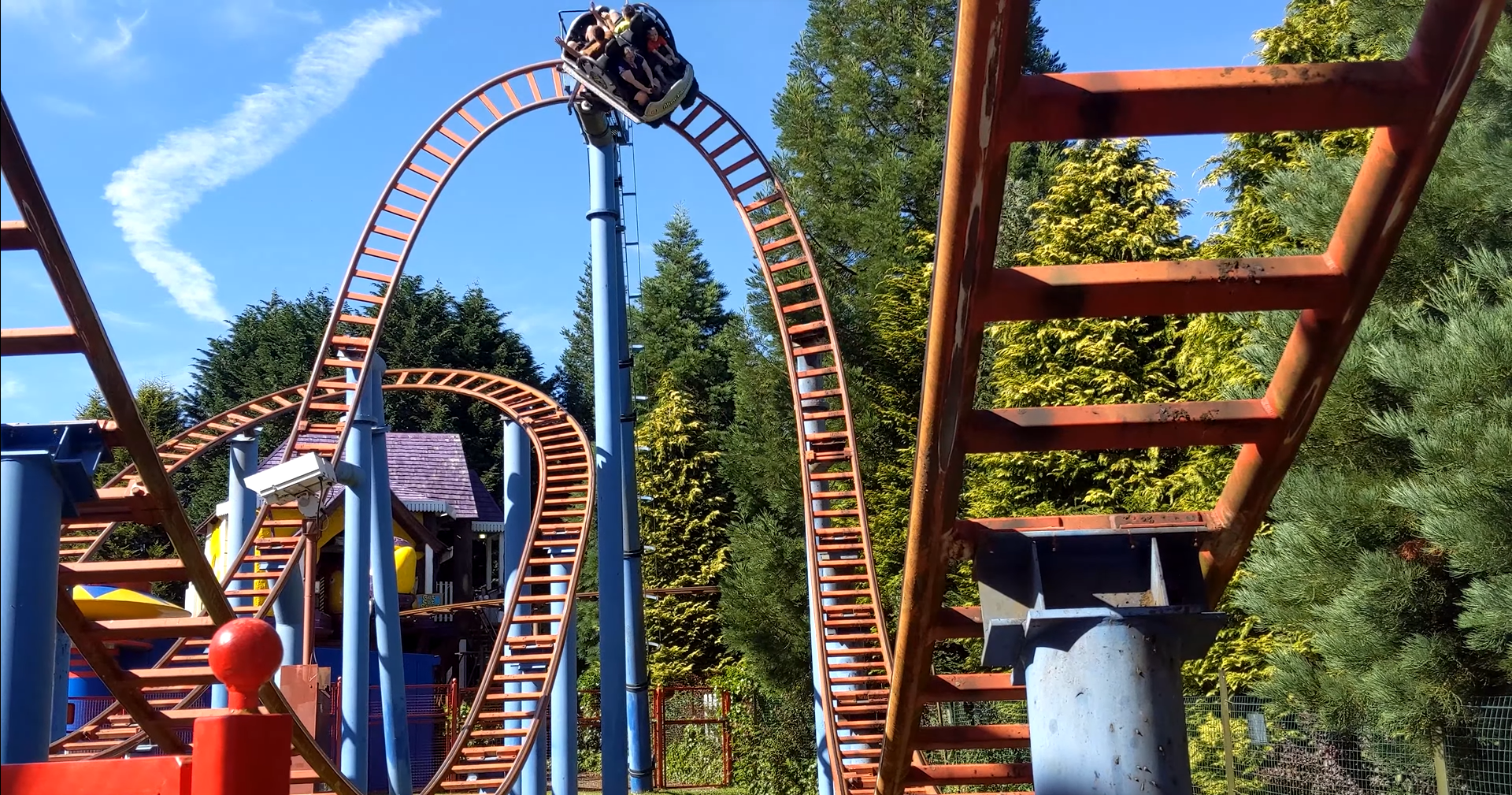

Alton Towers
- Location: Alton Towers
- Park section: The Towers
- Coordinates: 52.988915°N 1.89457°W
- Status: Operating
- Opening date: 27 March 2004
- Cost: £3,500,000

General statistics
- Type: Steel – Spinning
- Manufacturer: Maurer AG
- Model: SC 2200
- Lift/launch system: Chain lift hill
- Height: 17 m (56 ft)
- Length: 470 m (1,540 ft)
- Speed: 60 km/h (37 mph)
- Inversions: 0
- Duration: 1:15
- Capacity: 950 riders per hour
- G-force: 3
- Height restriction: 120–195 cm (3 ft 11 in – 6 ft 5 in)
- Fastrack available
- Single rider line is available
- Spinball Whizzer at RCDB

Spinball Whizzer is a spinning roller coaster located in The Towers area of Alton Towers in Staffordshire, England. Built by Maurer Söhne, it was previously sponsored by Sega, the company that created the Sonic the Hedgehog video game franchise, and was known as Sonic Spinball from 2010 to 2015.

== History ==
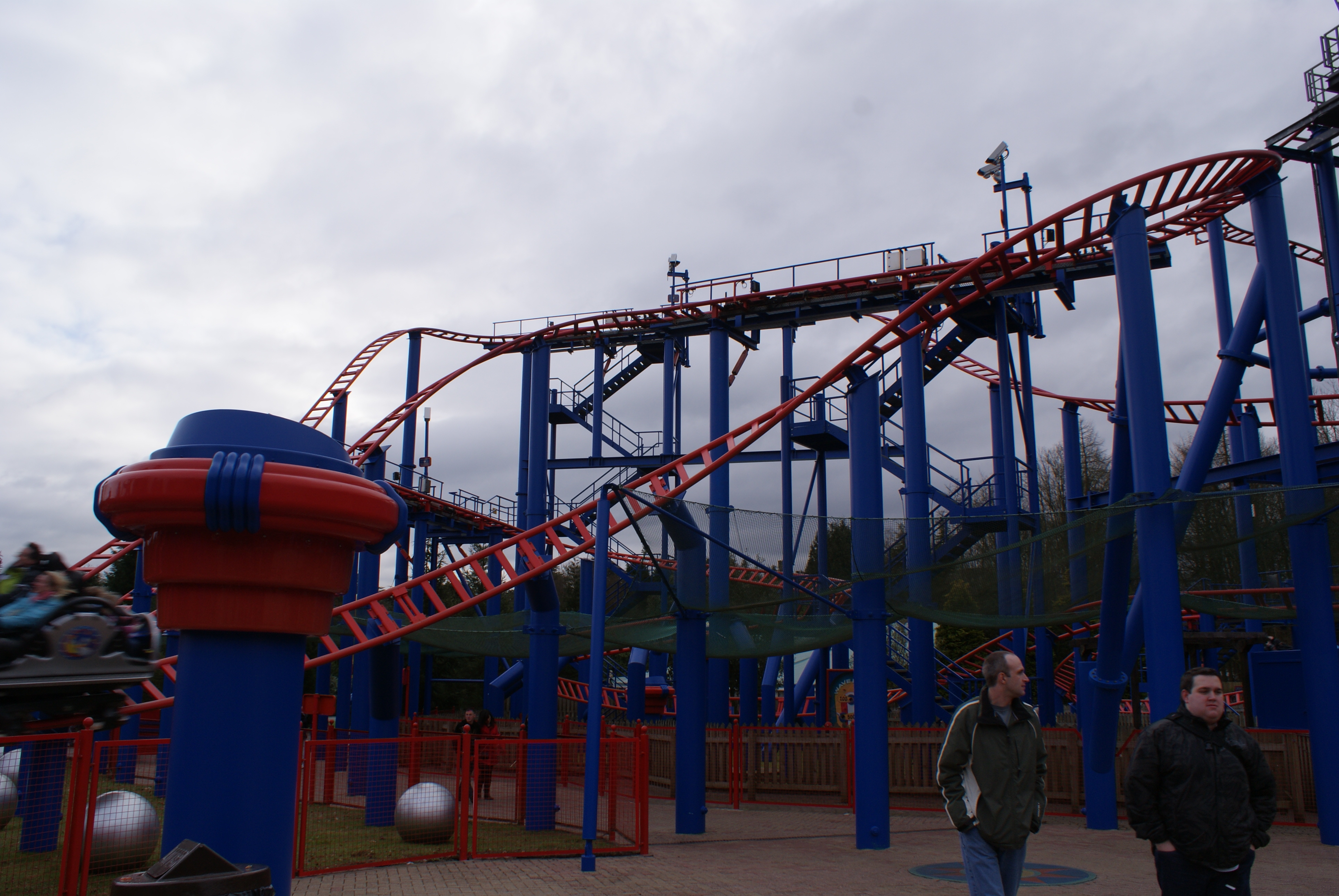
Sonic Spinball after its re-branding in 2010

Opening in 2004, Spinball Whizzer featured a loose pinball machine theme. The name was a pun on the song "Pinball Wizard" by The Who. In 2010, it was announced that Spinball Whizzer would be receiving a Sonic the Hedgehog re-brand as part of a partnership with Japanese video game company Sega. The roller coaster was therefore given a red and blue track repaint; new decoys, signage, and audio, including songs from the games and station announcements provided in-character by Roger Craig Smith as Sonic, before his official debut as the character in Sonic Free Riders. The ride re-opened to the public as Sonic Spinball on 13 February 2010 during the park's February half-term event. A Sonic-themed room was also made available at the Alton Towers Hotel, which featured various playable Sonic games and wallpaper based on Sonic the Hedgehog 4: Episode I.

Sega previously had a deal with Alton Towers for the Toyland Tours dark ride. A Sonic animatronic featured in one of the ride's scenes, along with associated sound effects and music. However, the ride was closed for refurbishment in June 2005 to make way for Charlie and the Chocolate Factory: The Ride. Currently, the Alton Towers Dungeons. Sega's sponsorship was set to end in 2013 as part of the three-year deal. At the end of 2013, the sponsorship was renewed and continued until 2016.

On 2 June 2015, the ride was temporarily closed, owing to an accident on The Smiler at Alton Towers. Sonic Spinball reopened on 15 June 2015. The ride's original Spinball Whizzer theme was restored for the 2016 season as part of the Adventure Land.

== See also ==
- Dragon's Fury, a similar roller coaster at sister park Chessington World of Adventures
