= Winja's Fear & Force =

Spinning roller coaster at Phantasialand

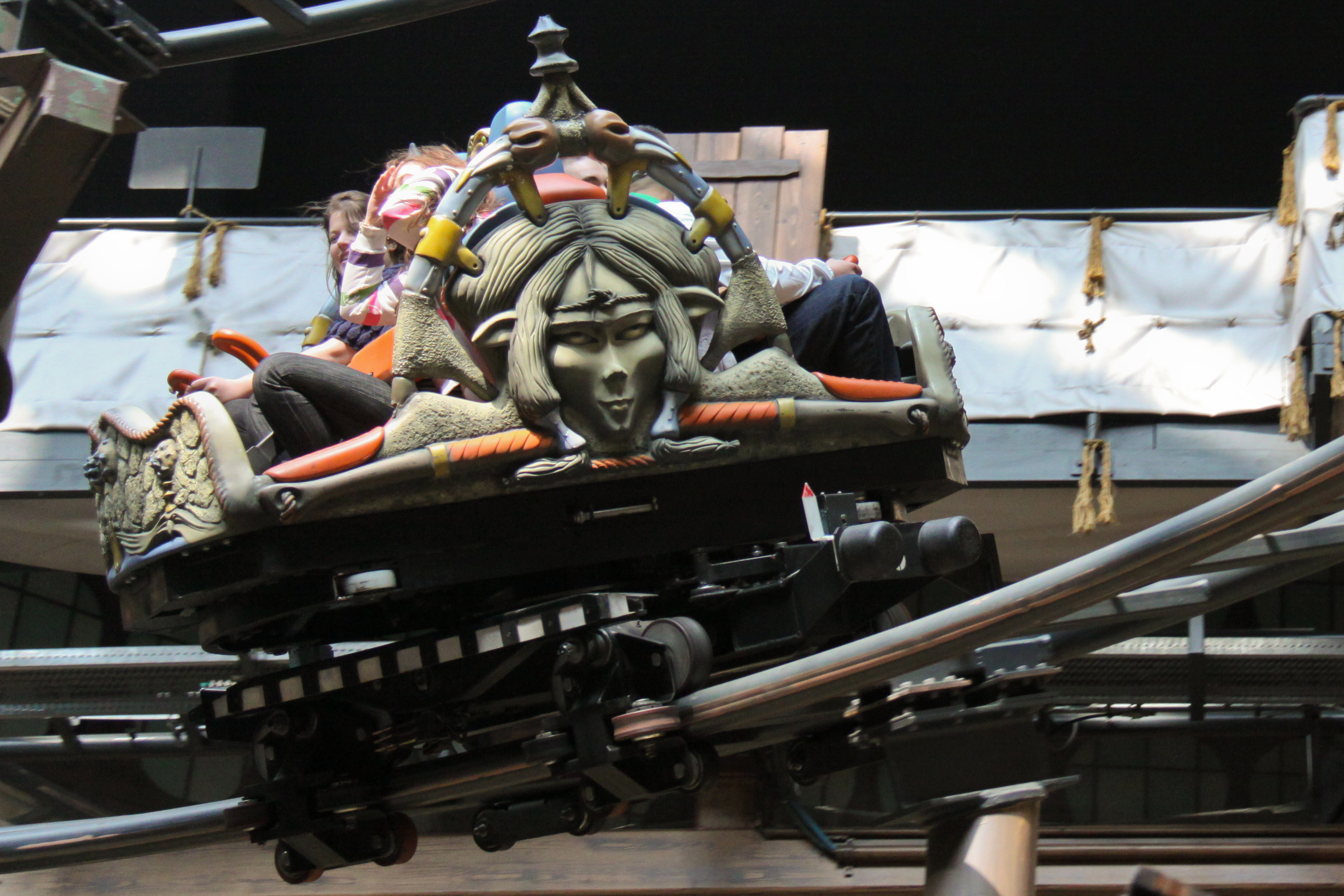

Phantasialand
- Park section: Fantasy - Wuze Town
- Coordinates: 50.8002°N 6.8777°E
- Status: Operating
- Opening date: March 30, 2002
- Replaced: Kinderland

General statistics
- Type: Steel – Spinning – Indoor
- Manufacturer: Maurer AG
- Designer: Werner Stengel
- Model: Xtended SC 3000
- Lift/launch system: Elevator Lift
	Force	Fear
Height	57.08 ft (17.4 m)	57.08 ft (17.4 m)
Length	1,345.17 ft (410.0 m)	1,525.58 ft (465.0 m)
Speed	37.25 mph (59.9 km/h)	41 mph (66.0 km/h)
Max vertical angle	45°	50°
- Capacity: 1440 riders per hour
- Height restriction: 120–200 cm (3 ft 11 in – 6 ft 7 in)
- Winja's Fear & Force at RCDB; Pictures of Winja's Fear & Force at RCDB

Winja's Fear and Winja's Force are two spinning roller coasters at Phantasialand in Brühl, North Rhine-Westphalia, Germany. They are located in Wuze Town, an indoor area of the park.

The rides were built by Maurer AG and incorporated into Phantasialand by park designer Eric Daman.

The rides consist of two similar tracks which feature some unique sections. The cars seat four people, two facing backwards, and freely spin after the first drop. In theory, this would mean every single ride would spin in a unique pattern. However, several sections of track are designed to make optimal use of the car's momentum, forcing the car to move in certain ways.

The two roller coasters are raised via a vertical lift instead of the traditional lift hill. The Winjas feature a unique hinged section of track about halfway through, with Fear collapsing forward and Force banking sideways in order to continue. The two coasters travel on separate tracks and are intertwined in the main hall of Wuze Town. At the very end of the ride, a little surprise element is built in, which shortly drops a section of track a few feet and raises it again.

The ride is themed to fit the Wuze Town environment, a fictional town of myths and fantasy. The character Winja after whom the rides are named, is the main character of the area. A soundtrack specially written for the Winja's can be heard in the queuing area. Two samples of the soundtrack for the 2000 Disney film Dinosaur are also used during the ride, respectively the lift and hinged sections.
