= Maurer AG =

German amusement ride manufacturer

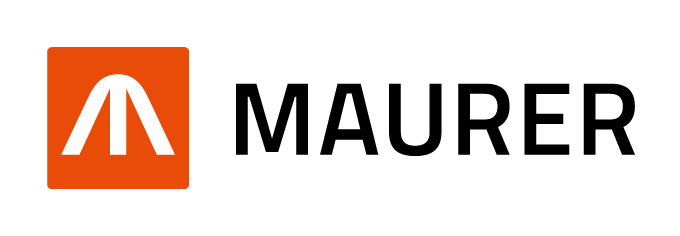
- Industry: Manufacturing
- Founded: 1876; 150 years ago
- Founder: Maurer Söhne
- Headquarters: Munich, Germany
- Number of locations: Germany, China, Turkey
- Area served: More than 50 countries
- Products: Amusement rides, bridges, roller coasters, steel buildings
- Number of employees: 700 (2009)
- Divisions: Maurer Rides, Structural Protection Systems, Structural Steelwork
- Website: maurer-rides.de

Maurer AG, formerly known as Maurer Söhne GmbH & Co. KG, is a steel construction company and roller coaster manufacturer. Founded in 1876 in Munich, Germany, the company has built many styles of steel buildings, ranging from bridges, industrial buildings, and even art structures. While known for building a variety of wild mouse coasters, its subsidiary Maurer Rides GmbH has branched out into spinning, looping, and launching coasters. The company also produces a free-fall tower ride. On December 15, 2014, the company changed its name to Maurer AG.

== Roller coaster work ==
In 1993, Maurer took over the amusement ride division of a fellow German firm, BHS. BHS constructed four Schwarzkopf-designed roller coasters, working with Sansei Yusoki and Zierer in the process. Maurer's first ride was a custom looping roller coaster called Venus GP that opened at Space World in 1996. Since then they have produced almost 50 roller coasters including spinning, launched, racing and wild mouse roller coasters.

One of the first types of roller coaster that Maurer manufactured was a wild mouse. The design, known as Wilde Maus Classic, was first installed as Kopermijn at Drievliet Family Park in 1996. At the end of 2010, the Wilde Maus Classic design has been replicated at 13 locations around the world.

In 2000, the S-Coaster was introduced by Maurer. The S-Coaster is Maurer's spinning roller coaster design. It is the most popular design (in terms of installations) that Maurer has ever produced with over 21 installations worldwide.

Maurer's X-Coaster comes in a variety of different designs: X-Car, X-Train and SkyLoop. Under the X-Car category Maurer manufactures rides with launches, vertical lifts, floorless cars and cars with embedded music systems. An X-Train X-Coaster is one which features 4-across seating (2 seats above the track and one on either side of the track as a floorless seat). Under the SkyLoop category Maurer has a variety of models including XT 150 (150 m (490 ft) in length), XT 450 (450 m (1,480 ft) in length), launched and custom designs.

Most recently, in 2010, Maurer introduced the R-Coaster. The R-Coaster is a type of racing roller coaster which features several sets of Linear Synchronous Motors on two parallel tracks. The first, and currently only, R-Coaster is Fiorano GT Challenge at Ferrari World in Abu Dhabi. In 2018, it was announced that Maurer would be building the first roller coaster at sea, on the Carnival cruise ship Mardi Gras.

== List of roller coasters ==
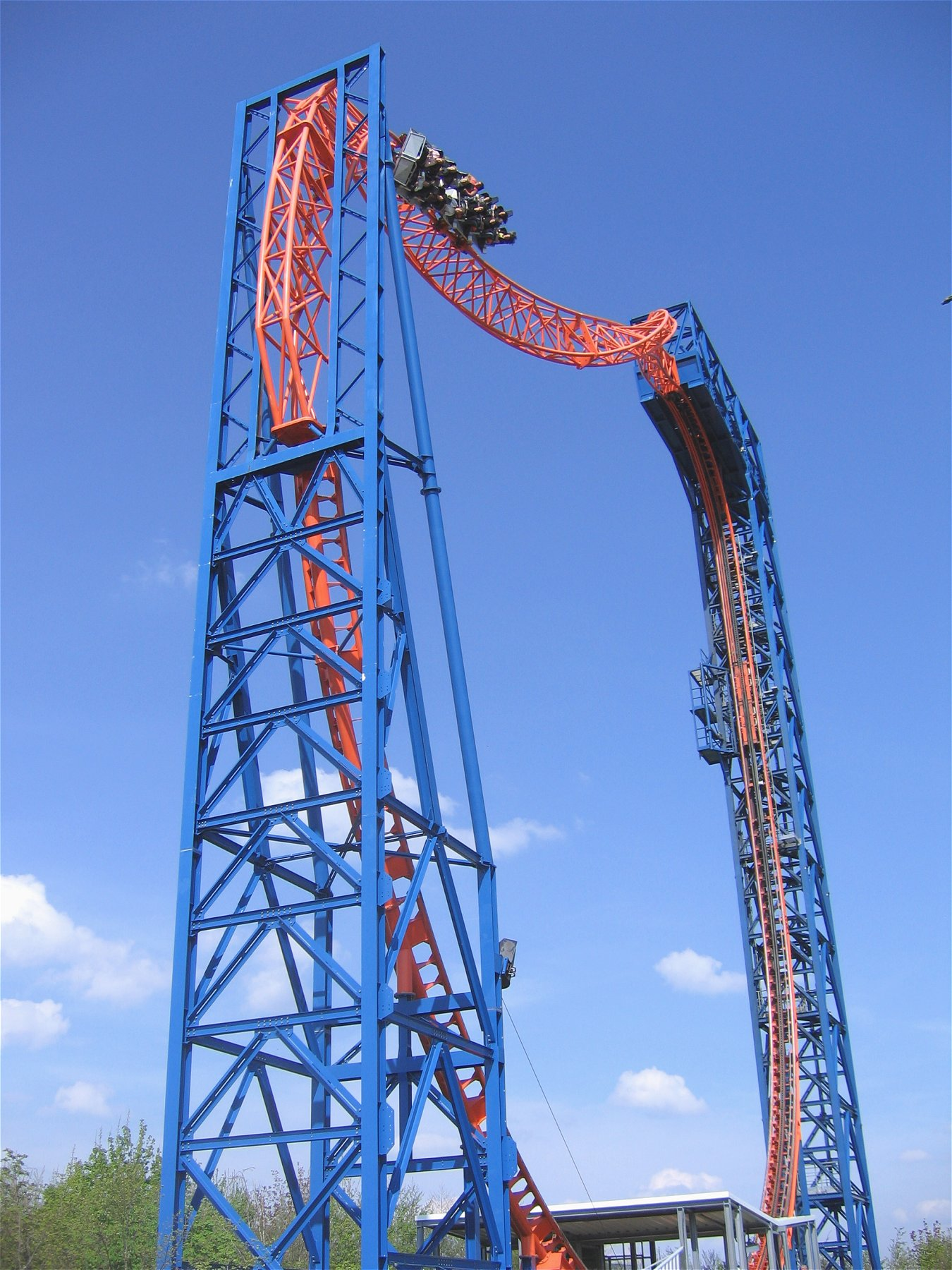
Sky Wheel at Skyline Park is a SkyLoop XT 150 X-Coaster.

As of 2023, Maurer AG has built 68 roller coasters around the world.

Name	Model	Park	Country	Opened	Status	Ref
Star Wars	Spinning Coaster	Wonder Island	Russia	Never opened	Removed	
Kopermijn	Wild Mouse	Drievliet	Netherlands	1996	Operating	
Crazy Mine	Wild Mouse	Hansa Park	Germany	1997	Operating	
Wilde Maus	Wild Mouse	Wiener Prater	Austria	1997	Operating	
Wild Mouse	Wild Mouse	Lagoon	United States	1998	Operating	
Rattlesnake	Wild Mouse	Chessington World of Adventures	United Kingdom	1998	Operating	
Wild Mouse	Wild Mouse	Dorney Park	United States	2000	Operating	
Marsh Mayhem; Formerly Go Bananas! Formerly Bug Out	Wild Mouse	Wild Adventures	United States	2000	Operating	
Twistrix	Spinning Coaster	Drievliet	Netherlands	2001	Operating	
Winjas	Spinning Coaster SC3000	Phantasialand	Germany	2002	Operating	
Spider	Spinning Coaster SC2000	Lagoon	United States	2003	Operating	
Wild Storm	Spinning Coaster Compact	O-World	South Korea	2003	Operating	
Whirlwind	Spinning Coaster SC2000	Seabreeze Amusement Park	United States	2004	Operating	
Dragon's Fury	Spinning Coaster SC3000	Chessington World of Adventures	United Kingdom	2004	Operating	
Spinball Whizzer; Formerly Sonic Spinball	Spinning Coaster SC2200	Alton Towers	United Kingdom	2004	Operating	
Steel Dragon	Spinning Coaster SC2000	Waldameer & Water World	United States	2004	Operating	
Sky Wheel	SkyLoop XT 150	Skyline Park	Germany	2004	Operating	
Tarántula	Spinning Coaster SC3000	Parque de Atracciones de Madrid	Spain	2005	Operating	
G Force	X-Car	Drayton Manor	United Kingdom	2005-2018	Removed	
Wilde Maus	Wilde Maus	Al Hokair Land Theme Park	Saudi Arabia	2006	Removed	
X Coaster	SkyLoop XT 150	Magic Springs & Crystal Falls	United States	2006	Operating	
Abismo	SkyLoop XT 450	Parque de Atracciones de Madrid	Spain	2006	Operating	
Formule X	X-Car	Drievliet	Netherlands	2007	Operating	
Crush's Coaster	Spinning Coaster	Walt Disney Studios Park	France	2007	Operating	
Salama	Spinning Coaster SC3000	Linnanmäki	Finland	2008	Operating	
Hollywood Rip Ride Rockit	X-Car	Universal Studios Florida	United States	2009	Removed	
Spinning Coaster	Spinning Coaster Compact	Holnemvolt Park	Hungary	2009	Removed	
Wild Mouse	Wild Mouse	Funtown Splashtown USA; Jolly Roger Amusement Park	United States	2009; 2002 to 2006	Operating	
Dream Coaster	X-Car	Dream City	Iraq	2010	Operating	
Fiorano GT Challenge	Family Launch Coaster	Ferrari World	United Arab Emirates	2010	Operating	
Shock	X-Car	Rainbow MagicLand	Italy	2011	Operating	
Naga Bay; Formerly Dizz	Spinning Coaster SC3000	Bobbejaanland	Belgium	2011	Operating	
Gotham City Gauntlet: Escape from Arkham Asylum; Formerly Road Runner Express	Wild Mouse	Six Flags New England; Kentucky Kingdom	United States	2011; 2000 to 2009	Operating	
Cagliostro	Spinning Coaster SC3000	Rainbow MagicLand	Italy	2011	Operating	
Ukko	SkyLoop XT 150	Linnanmäki	Finland	2011	Operating	
Spinner; Formerly Speedy	Spinning Coaster Compact	Skara Sommarland; Abenteuer Park Oberhausen	Sweden	2011; 2001 to 2010	Operating	
Clouds Of Fairyland	SkyLoop XT 150	Joyland	China	2011	Operating	
Freischütz	X-Car	Bayern Park	Germany	2011	Operating	
Wilde Maus	Wild Mouse	Freizeit-Land Geiselwind	Germany	2012	Removed	
Hidden Anaconda	SkyLoop XT 150	Happy Valley Wuhan	China	2012	Operating	
Terror Twister	SkyLoop XT 150	Fantawild Adventure Zhengzhou	China	2012	Operating	
Crazy Car; Formerly FamilyCo Express	X-Car	Happy Valley Wuhan	China	2013	Operating	
Terror Twister	SkyLoop XT 150	Nantong Adventure Land	China	2013	Operating	
Sky Spin; Formerly Whirlwind	Spinning Coaster SC2000	Skyline Park; Camelot Theme Park	Germany	2013; 2003 to 2012	Operating	
Insider; Formerly Spinning Coaster Maihime	Spinning Coaster Compact	Wiener Prater; Tokyo Dome City	Austria	2013; 2000 to 2011	Operating	
Undertow	Spinning Coaster SC2000	Santa Cruz Beach Boardwalk	United States	2013	Operating	
Marble Madness; Formerly Wild Mouse	Wild Mouse	Pleasurewood Hills; Flamingo Land	United Kingdom	2014; 1997 to 2012	Operating	
Terror Twister	SkyLoop XT 150	Fantawild Dreamland Xiamen	China	2015	Operating	
Laff Trakk	Spinning Coaster SC2000	Hersheypark	United States	2015	Operating	
Unknown	Spinning Coaster	Respublika	Ukraine	2015 (2021)	Operating	
Dragon Legend	X-Car	Romon U-Park	China	2016	Operating	
Dragon Flight	Spinning Coaster SC3000	Eontime World	China	2015	Removed	
Sky Dragster	Spike Dragster	Skyline Park	Germany	2017	Operating	
Käpt'n Jack's Wilde Maus; Formerly Holly's Wilde Autofahrt; Formerly Rat; Formerly Wild Mouse	Wild Mouse	Eifelpark; Holiday Park; Loudoun Castle; Dreamland	Germany	2017; 2010 to 2016; 2005 to 2009; 1998 to 2004	Operating	
Wilde Maus	Wild Mouse	Anapa Park Jungle; Attrapark	Russia	2018; 2007 to 2016	Operating	
Desmo Race	Spike Dragster	Mirabilandia	Italy	2019	Operating	
Phoenix	Spinning Coaster SC2000	Adventureland	United States	2019	Operating	
Alien Taxi; Formerly Xtreme	Spinning Coaster SC2000	Trans Studio Action Zone; Blue Bayou and Dixie Landin'; Drievliet	Indonesia	2019; 2007 to 2017; 2004 to 2006	Operating	
Roller Coaster	Spinning Coaster	Galaxy Amusement Park	Ukraine	2020	Operating	
Spinning Racer	Spinning Coaster SC2000	Fantasy Island	United Kingdom	2021	Removed	
Bolt: Ultimate Sea Coaster	Spike Cruise Racing	Mardi Gras cruise ship	(The Bahamas) Bahamas	2021	Operating	
Now You See Me: High Roller	Spinning Coaster	Motiongate Dubai	United Arab Emirates	2022	Operating	
Venus GP	Looping Coaster	Himeji Central Park; Rusutsu Resort; Space World	Japan	2022; 2019; 1996 to 2017	Operating	
Bolt: Ultimate Sea Coaster	Spike Cruise Racing	Carnival Celebration cruise ship Skyline Park	Panama	2022	Operating	
Project Zero; Formerly BuzzSaw	SkyLoop XT 150	Gumbuya World; Dreamworld	Australia	2022; 2011 to 2021	Operating	
Speedy Nuts	Wild Mouse	Papéa Parc; Antibes Land; Fabrikus World	France	2023; 2011 to 2013; 2007 to 2010	Operating	
Spinning Coaster	Spinning Coaster SC3000	Wonderla; Habtoorland	India	2024; 2004 to 2010	Operating	
Sea Stallion	Spike Custom	Six Flags Qiddiya City	Saudi Arabia	2025	Under Construction	
Unknown	Spinning Coaster	Sunac Cultural Tourism City	China	TBD	Under Construction	
Unknown	Spike Custom	Nickelodeon Universe Mall of China	China	TBD	Under Construction	
Ironcycle Test Run	Spike Cruise Racing	Disney Adventure cruise ship	Singapore	2026	Operating	

== Maurer German Wheels ==
Maurer German Wheels is a subsidiary of Maurer Söhne. It manufactures the R80XL giant Ferris wheel under licence from Bussink Design.
