= Spinning roller coaster =

Type of roller coaster

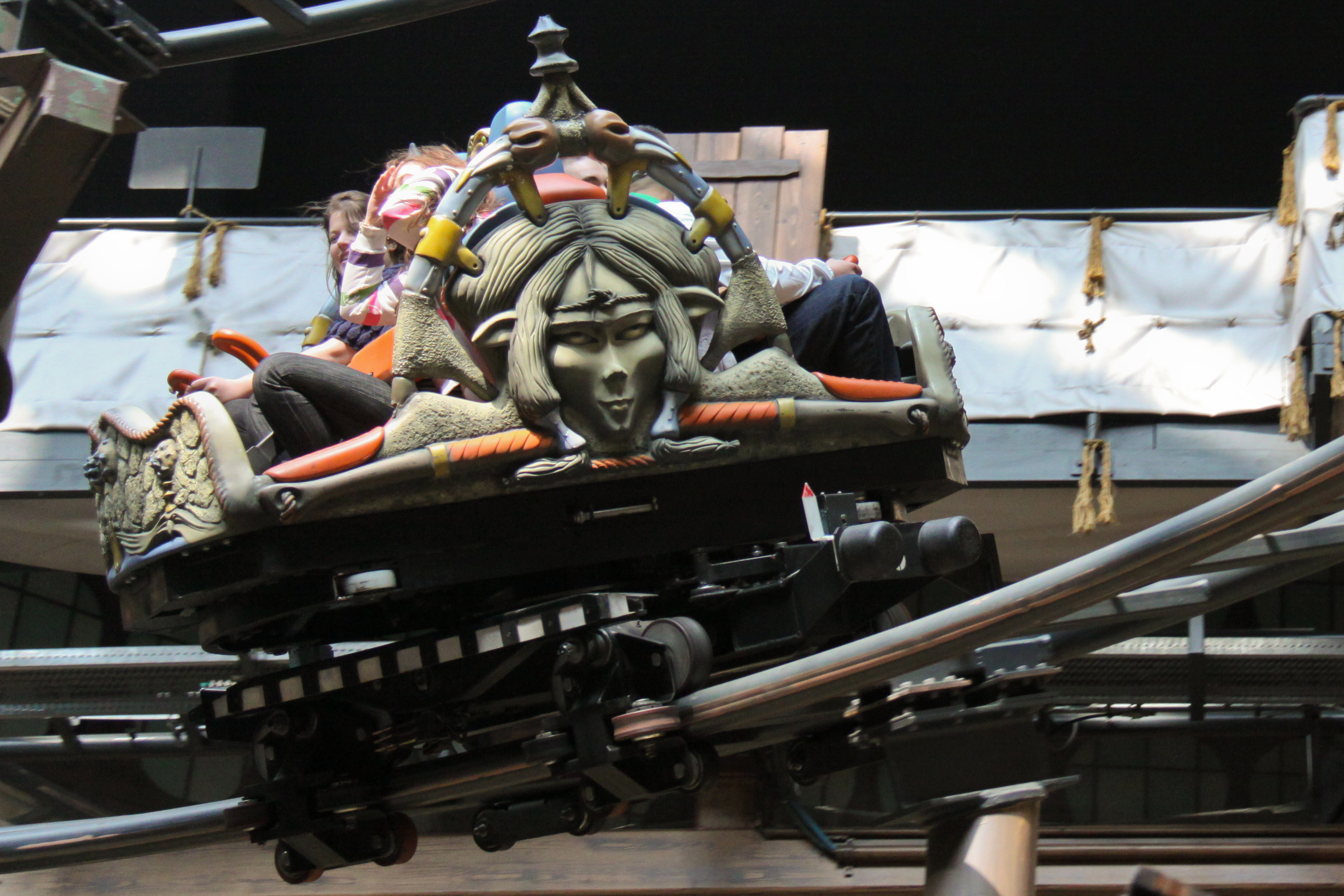
Winja's Fear & Force at Phantasialand, Germany

A spinning roller coaster is a roller coaster with cars that rotate on a vertical axis.

== Models ==
=== Virginia Reel ===
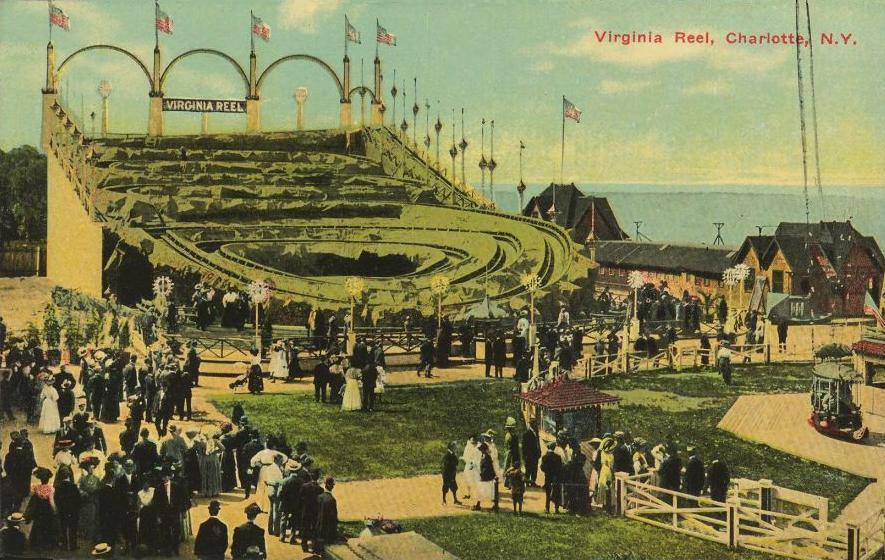
Virginia Reel at Ontario Beach Amusement Park, Charlotte, Rochester, New York c. 1910

The first spinning roller coaster was the Tickler, built in 1908 by Henry Riehl at Luna Park. Instead of trains, the ride had tubs with seats built around the perimeter facing inward. These tubs spun freely on their chassis as they travelled down the track, sitting in a trough configuration similar to that of a side friction roller coaster. Known as a Virginia Reel, these spinning coasters did not have big hills or drops, but instead, were designed to feature many sharp turns. Toward the end of the track layout were two helices, followed by a drop into a dark tunnel. The Virginia Reel was designed by Henry Elmer Riehl, who named the ride after his daughter, Luna Virginia Riehl. The first Virginia Reel was built in 1908 at Coney Island's Luna Park, where Henry Riehl was superintendent. The last full size Virginia Reel operated at Blackpool Pleasure Beach and closed in 1982. There is one survivor, albeit in miniature and semi-powered form, at Joyland (Great Yarmouth).

=== Spinning wild mouse coasters ===
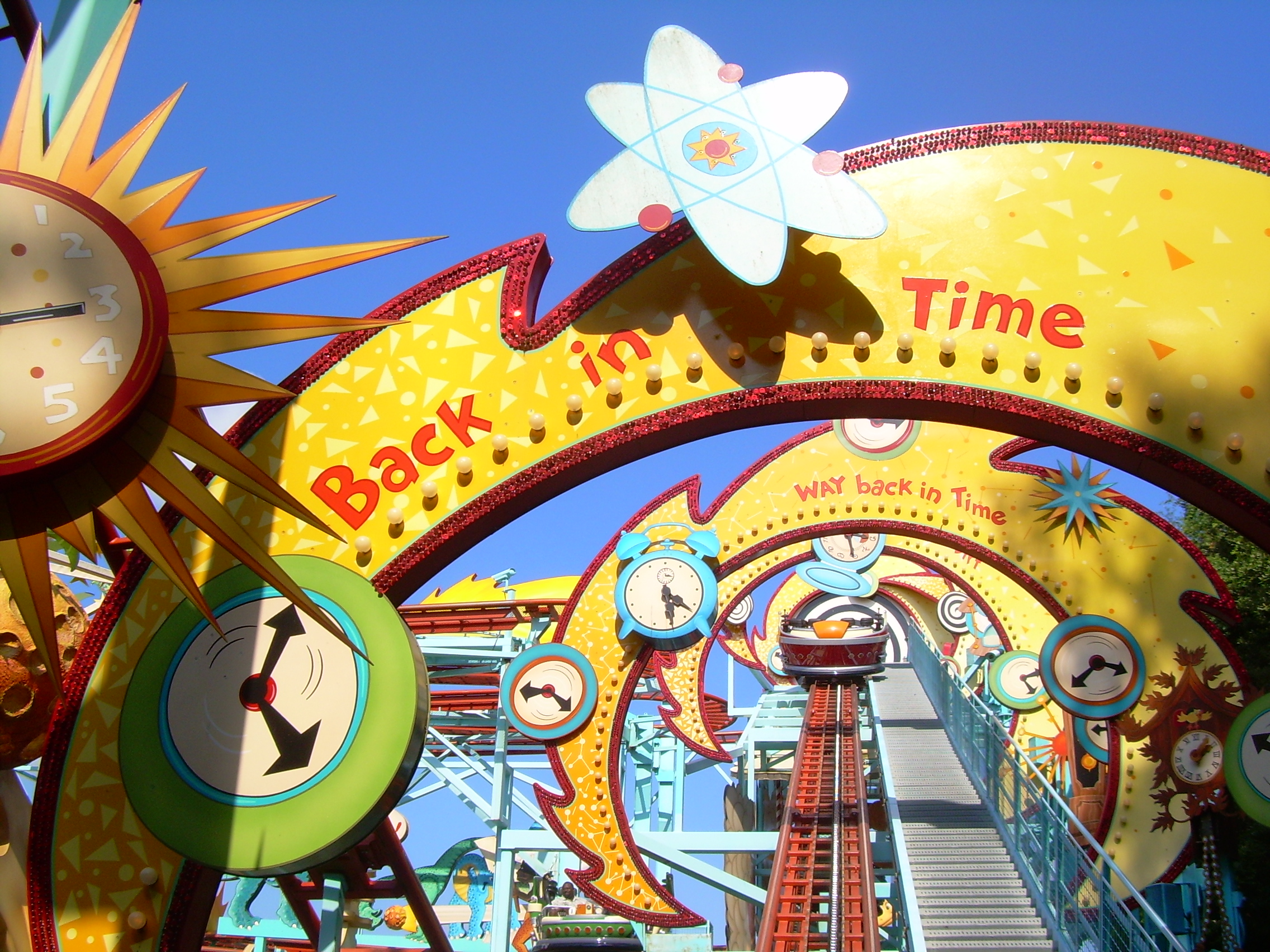
Primeval Whirl, a Reverchon spinning roller coaster

In 1997, the first spinning wild mouse roller coaster opened at the defunct Dinosaur Beach pier at Wildwood, New Jersey. Similar to the design of other wild mouse coasters, the ride features hairpin turns, but navigated with spinning cars. The design, noted for its portability and small footprint, became popular at smaller amusement parks and fairs. One well-known installation of the ride was Primeval Whirl at Disney's Animal Kingdom, which closed in 2020.

The spinning wild mouse was first manufactured by Reverchon Industries of France. In 2003, the company merged with Italy's Zamperla. Both companies eventually split apart again by 2006, when each began releasing their own spinning wild mouse coasters. Italy's Fabbri Group introduced a spinning model in 2006, and Maurer Söhne has been developing and constructing spinning coaster models since the early 2000s. In China's Jinma Rides also produces a version of the ride.

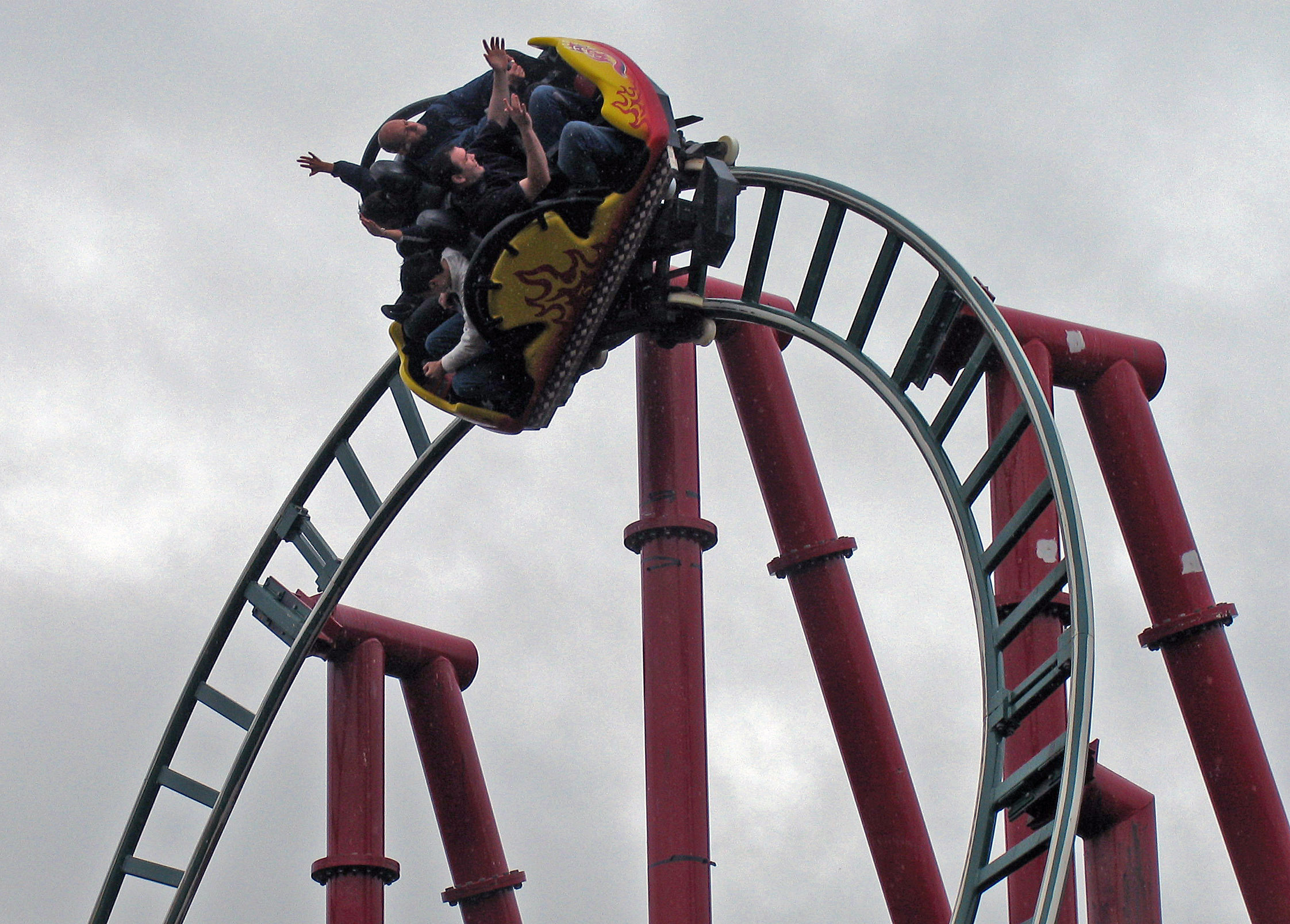
Dragon's Fury, a Maurer Söhne spinning roller coaster at Chessington World of Adventures

=== Other spinning roller coasters ===
Zierer built the first modern spinning roller coaster in 1994 with the Drehgondelbahn in Freizeit-Land Geiselwind. Maurer Söhne introduced its Xtended SC spinning coasters in the late 1990s. The seat configuration is the same as Maurer Söhne's Compact Spinning Coaster, but unlike that model, the Xtended SC has large, twisted layouts with many vertical hairpin turns intended to spin the cars around and give each rider a different experience every ride. Examples include Spider at Utah's Lagoon, Winja's Fear & Force at Germany's Phantasialand, Spinball Whizzer at the UK's Alton Towers, and Dragon's Fury at the UK's Chessington World of Adventures.

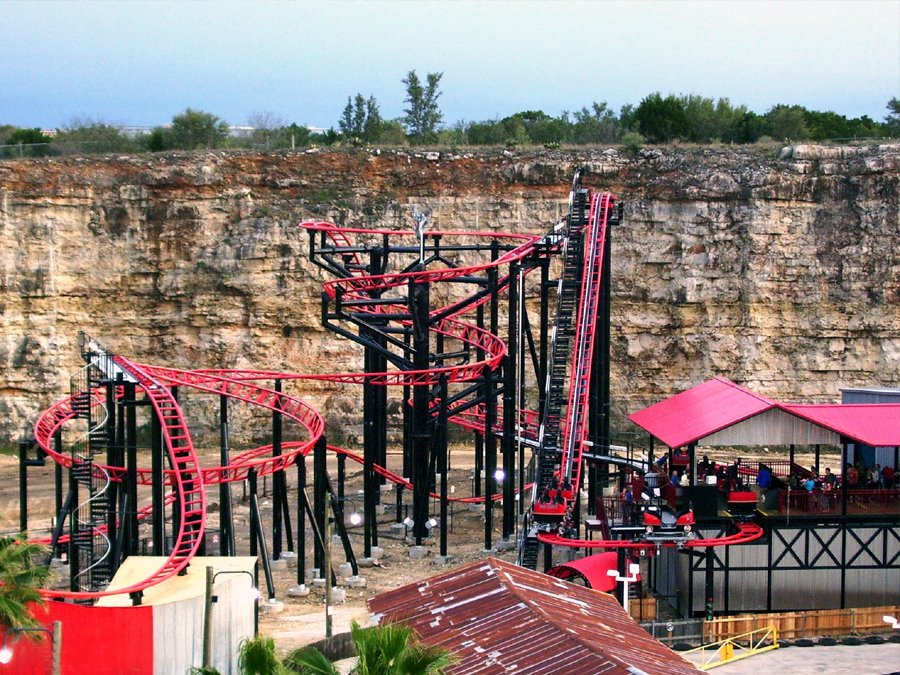
Pandemonium, a Gerstlauer spinning roller coaster

A similar ride debuted in 2004 when the first two Gerstlauer spinning coasters opened: Fairly Odd Coaster (formerly Timberland Twister) at Nickelodeon Universe inside the Mall of America, and Spinning Dragons at Worlds of Fun. These coasters have twisted track layouts similar to Maurer Söhne's Xtended SC, but the seats on Gerstlauer Spinning Coasters face towards each other, as with the Virginia Reel.

In 1995 Intamin debuted a spinning coaster with trains instead of individual cars: Comet Express at Lotte World in Seoul, South Korea. The trains have eight cars, with each car's two seats side by side. Like the Maurer Söhne and Gerstlauer spinning coasters, this "twist and turn coaster" features a twisted track layout. Three of these models have been built around the world.

Another spinning coaster with trains, Euro-Mir, was built by Mack Rides of Germany in 1997 at Europa-Park. The trains consist of four cars with four seats divided into two rows facing away from each other. The coaster has a twisted track layout that is built around five cylindrical towers. MACK opened a second coaster of this type, Sierra Sidewinder, at Knott's Berry Farm in 2007.

In 2018, Silver Dollar City opened Time Traveler, the world's first "Xtreme Spinning Coaster." Also created by Mack Rides, this ride consists of a more thrilling layout than other spinning coasters of the time, with a vertical drop directly out of the station, many bunny hills and turns, 2 LSM launches and 2 inversions. The second ride of this type was opened three years later in 2021. Named The Ride to Happiness, it is located at Plopsaland De Panne in Adinkerke, Belgium.

In 2026 and 2027, Universal Studios Hollywood and Universal Studios Florida are opening two large-scale spinning coasters, both called Fast & Furious: Hollywood Drift, by Intamin.

In 2027, Six Flags Great Adventure is opening Bakunawa, which will be the 3rd installment of the “Xtreme Spinning Coaster” by Mack Rides and will claim the record as the tallest and fastest spinning coaster in the world.
