= Dragon's Fury (roller coaster) =

Amusement park ride

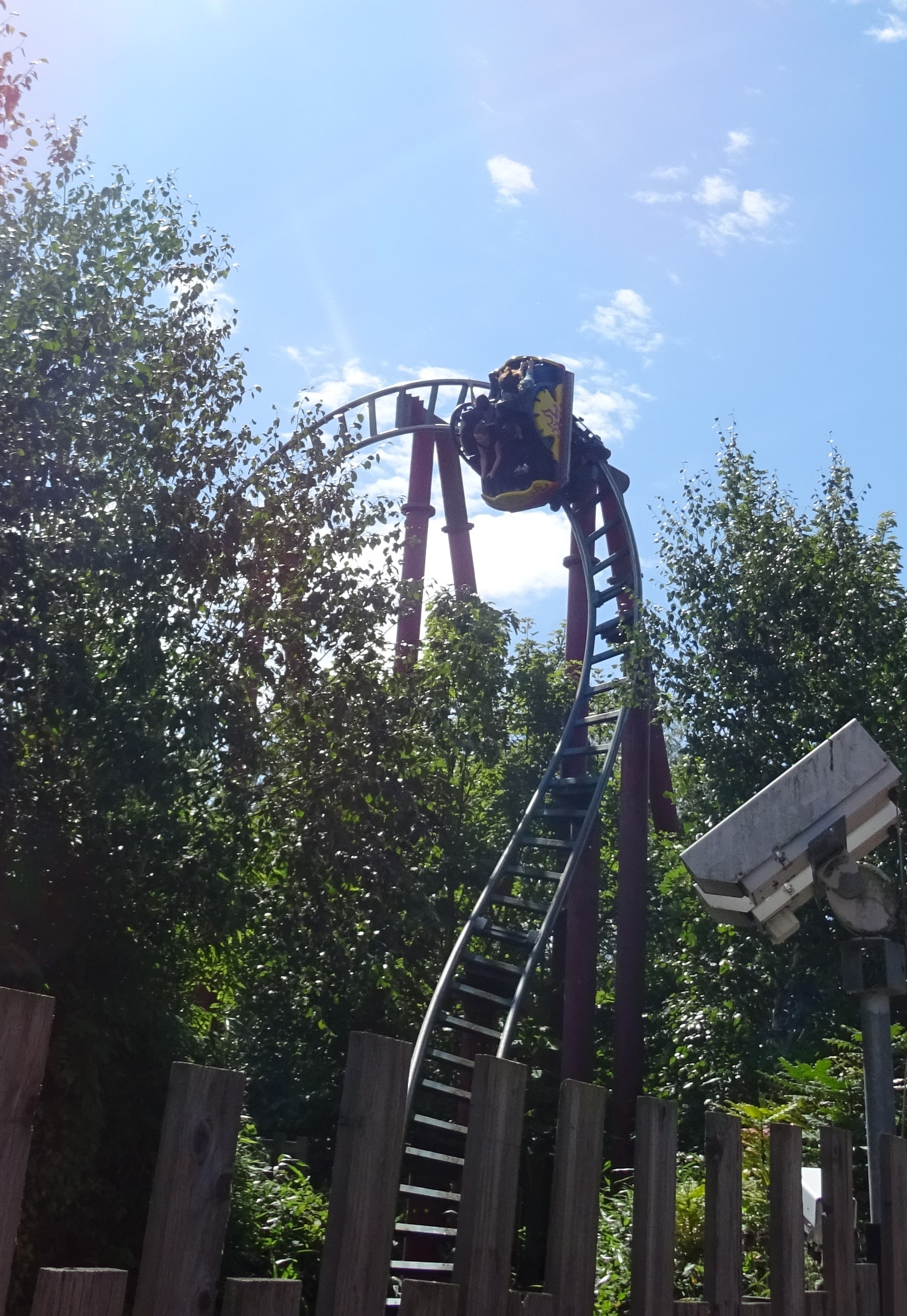

Chessington World of Adventures
- Location: Chessington World of Adventures
- Park section: Land of the Dragons
- Coordinates: 51.347988°N 0.319043°W
- Status: Operating
- Opening date: 27 March 2004

General statistics
- Type: Steel – Spinning
- Manufacturer: Maurer AG
- Designer: Tussauds Studios
- Model: Xtended SC 3000
- Lift/launch system: 2 chain lift hills
- Height: 50.8 ft (15.5 m)
- Length: 1,706 ft (520 m)
- Inversions: 0
- Capacity: 950 riders per hour
- Height restriction: 120 cm (3 ft 11 in)
- Trains: 8 individual cars with riders arranged 2 across in 2 rows for a total of 4 riders per car
- Restraints: Individual lap bar
- Reserve and Ride available
- Single rider line unavailable
- Wheelchair accessible
- Dragon's Fury at RCDB

Dragon's Fury is a steel spinning roller coaster located at Chessington World of Adventures Resort in southwest London, England. Manufactured by Maurer AG, the ride opened on 27 March 2004 and features individual four-person cars that spin independently on a horizontal axis.

== History ==
The ride was purchased by the Tussauds Group alongside Spinball Whizzer, a similar roller coaster that opened at Alton Towers in 2004. Its custom track layout was designed with assistance from John Wardley to accommodate the surrounding terrain. The steel roller coaster is a spinning variation that features two chain lift hills and opened to the public on 27 March 2004. It was manufactured by Maurer AG.

In June 2015, following an accident that left a guest in critical condition on The Smiler, Dragon's Fury was temporarily closed whilst safety was being evaluated.

== Description ==
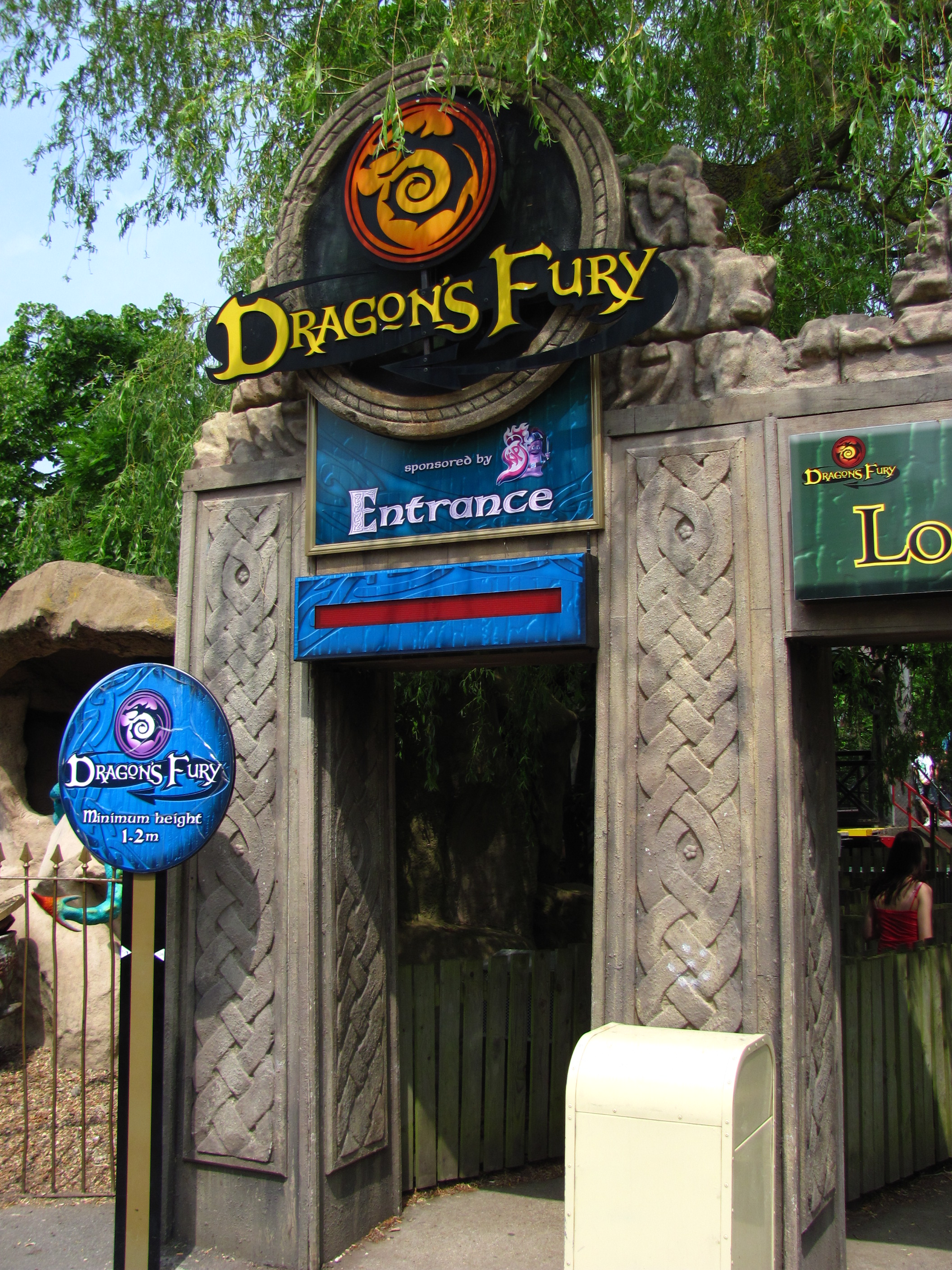
Entrance of the ride

The ride begins as the cars are dispatched from the station and immediately ascend a 50.8-foot-tall chain lift hill. Upon reaching the peak, the cars are released to rotate freely under the influence of gravity throughout the course. The ride starts with a drop to the right, followed by a horseshoe-banked turn to the left. This is followed by a rise into a block brake section. The cars then continue through a series of helixes, drops, and twists. Due to the track's length, the cars begin to lose momentum toward the final third of the ride. To address this, a second chain lift hill is incorporated, elevating the cars to a greater height and enabling them to complete the remainder of the course. The track reaches a maximum height of 51 ft (16 m).

== See also ==
- Chessington World of Adventures Resort
- Spinball Whizzer, a similar roller coaster at sister park Alton Towers
