= Adventure Alley =

Themed area at Six Flags Great Adventure

- Coordinates: 40.136013°N 74.4418551°W

Attractions
- Total: 4

Six Flags Great Adventure
- Status: Operating
- Opened: April 5, 2012
- Replaced: Fantasy Forest

Adventure Alley is a themed section at Six Flags Great Adventure in Jackson, New Jersey. It opened on April 5, 2012, replacing the former Fantasy Forest section of the park.

Some of the most popular attractions in Adventure Alley are the Giant Wheel, and SkyScreamer, an 242 feet (74 m) Swing ride that opened with the area in 2012.

== History ==
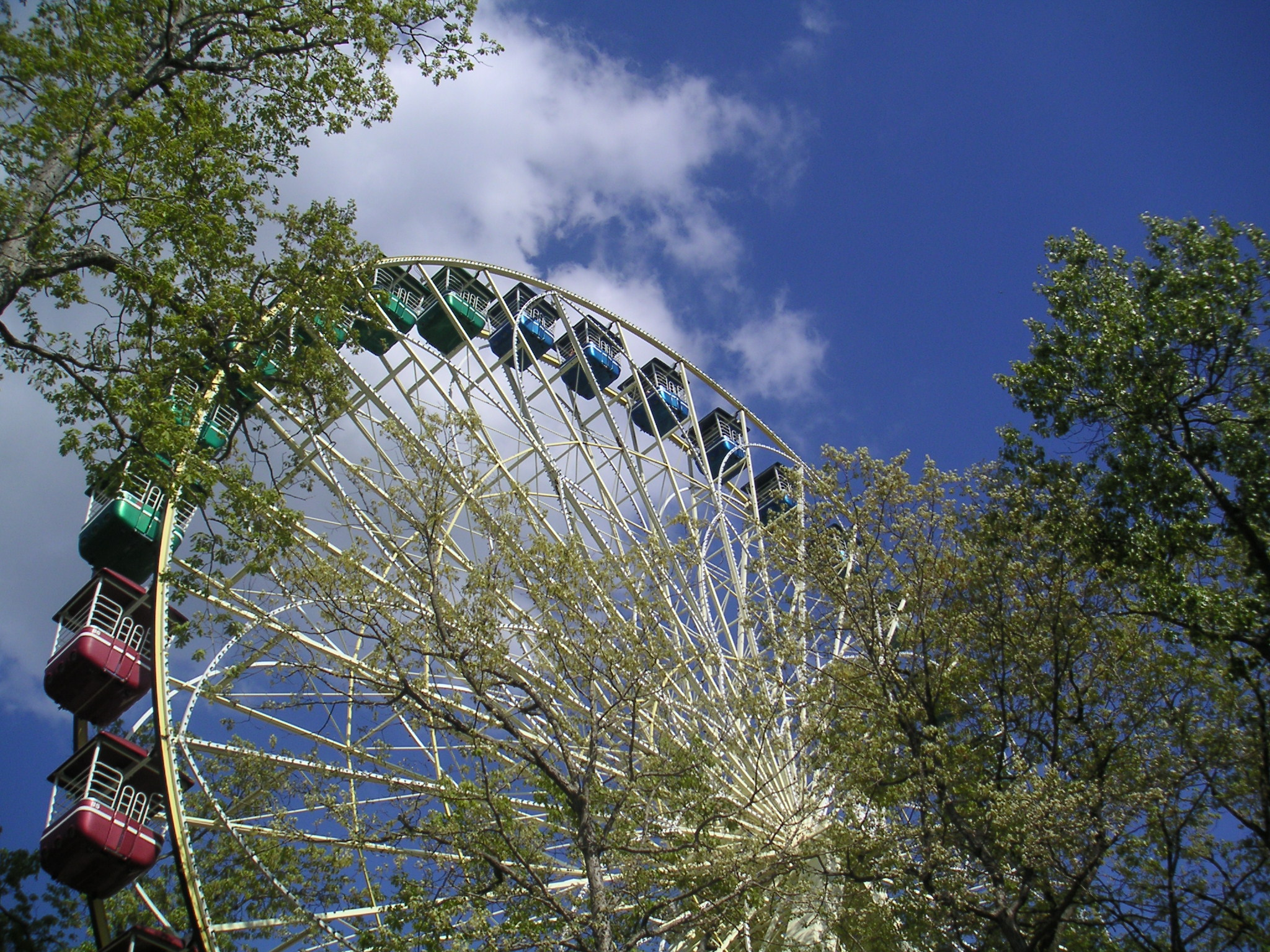
Giant Wheel

Before Adventure Alley, the area it now stands on was previously the west side of Fantasy Forest from the park's opening as Great Adventure in 1974 until 2011. However, for several years before Adventure Alley's addition, it was split up and rezoned, with Main Street added in-between.

In 2012, the west side of Fantasy Forest was closed and transformed to Adventure Alley, with an original theme that included three new rides and attractions, as well as new restaurants and shops.

== Attractions and Entertainment ==
=== Current Attractions ===
- Giant Wheel: 154-foot (47 m)-tall Ferris Wheel, opened in 1974 as the world's tallest and largest Ferris Wheel. In 2009, the ride went under rehab for the park's 35th anniversary.
- Studio 28 Arcade: Arcade
- SkyScreamer: An 242 feet (74 m) Funtime Star Flyer opened May 23, 2012
- Fender Benders: Bumper Cars, opened August 7, 2012.
- The Scrambler: Scrambler, opened May 23, 2012. Relocated from American Adventures.

== Restaurants ==
- Granny's Country Kitchen
- Mama Flora's Cucina

== Shops ==
- Quick Six Shop ~ Formerly known as Jersey Shore Souvenirs until 2012 and Adventure Gifts until 2025

== See also ==
- 2012 in amusement parks
