= 2012 in amusement parks =

This is a list of events and openings related to amusement parks that have occurred in 2012. These various lists are not exhaustive.

== Amusement parks ==
=== Opening ===
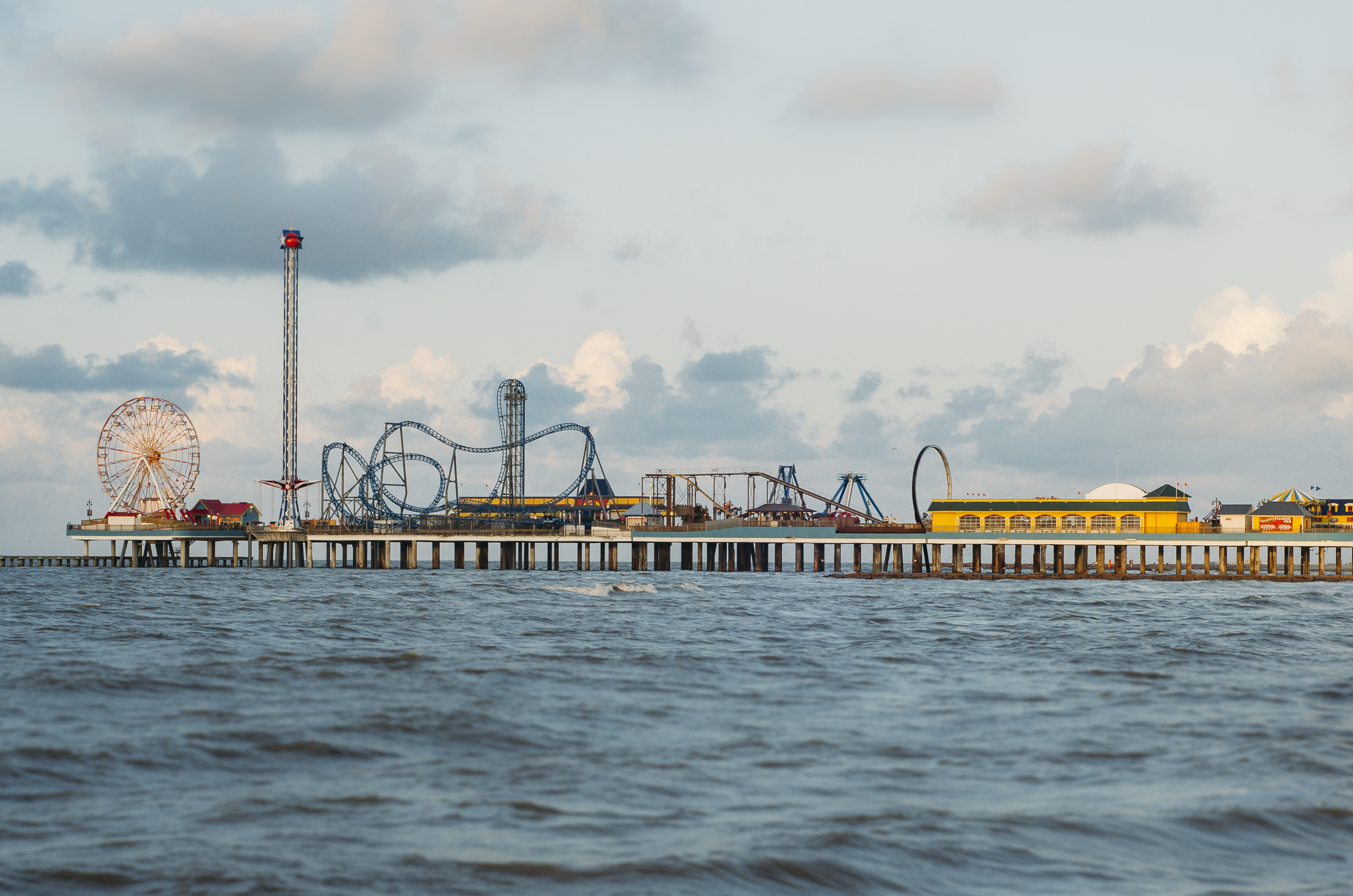
Galveston Island Historic Pleasure Pier opened in May.

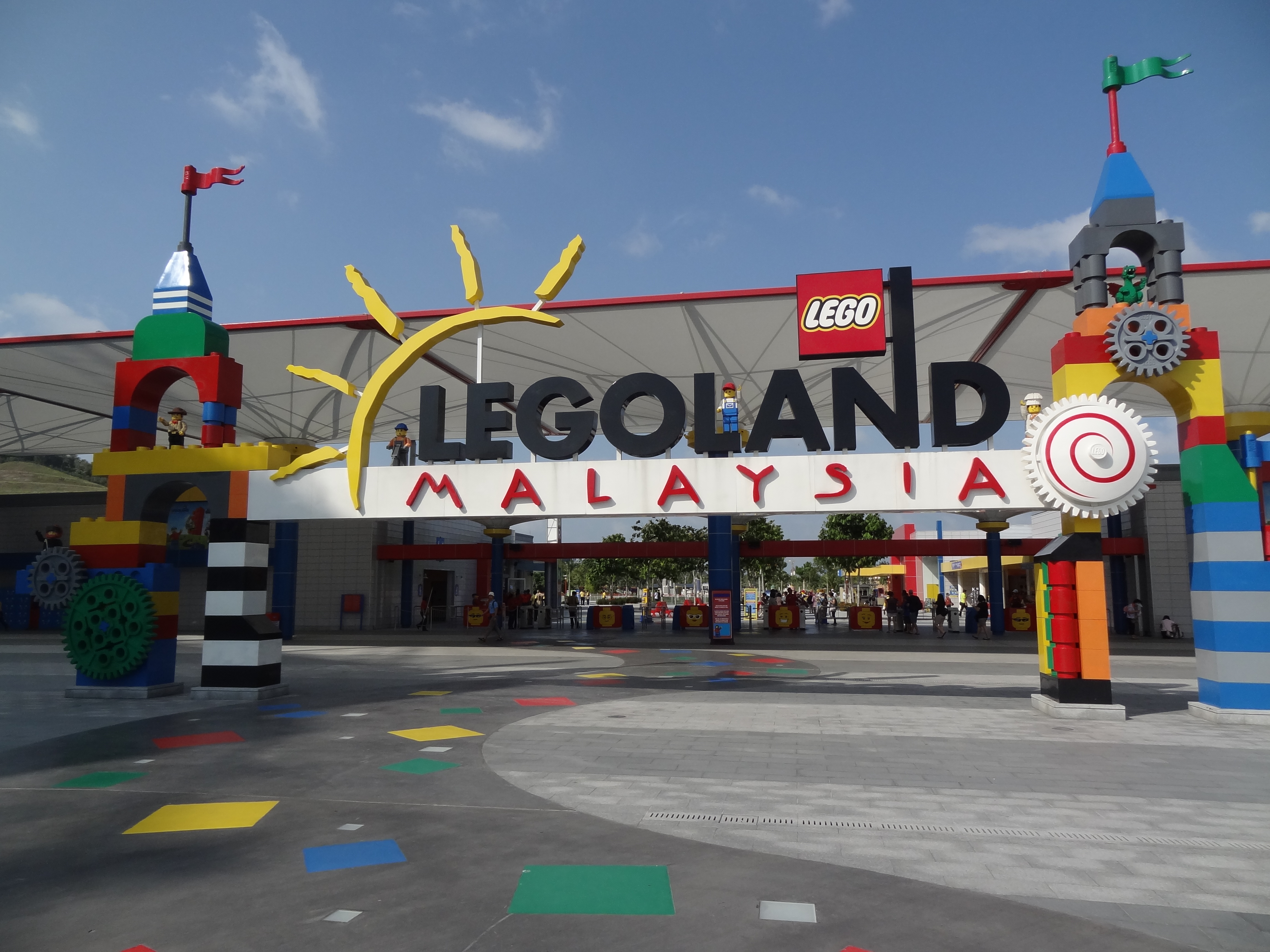
Legoland Malaysia opened in September.

- United States Aquatica San Antonio – May 19, replaced the former Lost Lagoon water park.
- United States Galveston Island Historic Pleasure Pier – May 25
- People's Republic of China Happy Valley, Wuhan – April 29
- Malaysia Legoland Malaysia – September 15

=== Change of name ===
- Alabama Adventure » Splash Adventure
- The Great Escape & Splashwater Kingdom » Great Escape
- Boomerang Bay » Soak City
- Disney's California Adventure » Disney California Adventure

=== Change of ownership ===
- Alabama Adventure – Adrenaline Family Entertainment » General Attractions LLC
- The Beach – Unknown » Adventure Holdings LLC
- Knott's Soak City (San Diego) – Cedar Fair Entertainment Company » SeaWorld Parks & Entertainment

=== Birthday ===
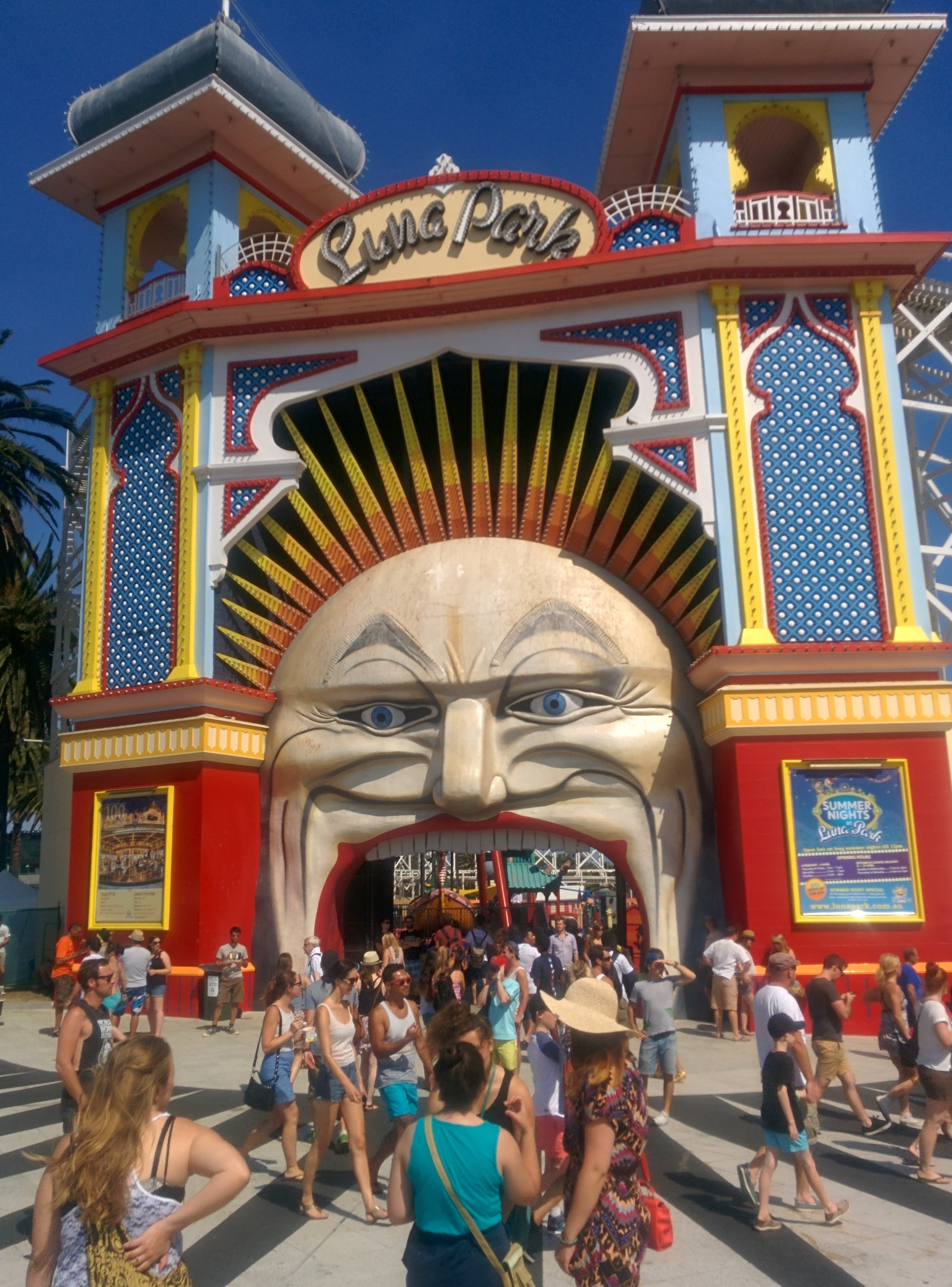
Luna Park Melbourne celebrated its centenary in December.

- United States Adventureland (New York) - 50th birthday
- England Chessington World of Adventures – 25th birthday
- France Disneyland Paris – 20th birthday
- Netherlands Efteling – 60th birthday
- United States Epcot – 30th birthday
- France Futuroscope – 25th birthday
- United States Kings Island – 40th birthday
- Canada La Ronde – 45th birthday
- Australia Luna Park, Melbourne – Centenary celebration (100th birthday)
- Italy Mirabilandia – 20th birthday
- People's Republic of China Ocean Park Hong Kong – 35th birthday
- United States Six Flags Fiesta Texas – 20th birthday
- United States Six Flags Over Georgia – 45th birthday
- France Walt Disney Studios Park – 10th birthday

=== Closed ===
- Camelot Theme Park - September 2
- Dash n Splash
- Le Bioscope - September 30

== Additions ==
=== Roller coasters ===
==== New ====
Name	Park	Type	Manufacturer	Opened
Arctic Blast	China Ocean Park	Powered roller coaster	Mack Rides	July 13
Big Grizzly Mountain Runaway Mine Cars	China Hong Kong Disneyland	Mine train roller coaster	Vekoma	July 13
Bullet Coaster	China Happy Valley, Shenzhen	Launched roller coaster	S&S Worldwide	July 28
Crazy Coaster	Australia Luna Park, Melbourne	Spinning roller coaster	Reverchon Industries	Unknown
Dauling Dragon	China Happy Valley, Wuhan	Wooden roller coaster	Martin & Vleminckx	April 29
Dinoconda	China China Dinosaurs Park	4th Dimension roller coaster	S&S Worldwide	April 29
Divertical	Italy Mirabilandia	Water Coaster	Intamin	June 16
Dragon	Malaysia Legoland Malaysia Resort	Family roller coaster	Zierer	September 15
Dragon Fly	Netherlands Duinrell	Family roller coaster	Gerstlauer	March 31
Dragon's Apprentice	Malaysia Legoland Malaysia Resort	Family roller coaster	Zierer	September 15
Dwervelwind	Netherlands Toverland	Spinning roller coaster	Mack Rides	September 29
Great LEGO Race	Malaysia Legoland Malaysia Resort	Wild mouse	Mack Rides	September 15
Iron Shark	United States Galveston Island Historic Pleasure Pier	Gerstlauer Euro-Fighter	Gerstlauer	June 1
Lego Technic Test Track	Malaysia Legoland Malaysia	Wild Mouse roller coaster	Mack Rides	September 15
Leviathan	Canada Canada's Wonderland	Giga coaster	Bolliger & Mabillard	May 6
Manta	United States SeaWorld San Diego	Launched roller coaster	Mack Rides	May 26
OzIris	France Parc Astérix	Inverted roller coaster	Bolliger & Mabillard	April 7
Peter Rabbit Coaster	Japan Nagashima Spa Land	Family roller coaster	Hoei Sangyo	April 25
Pindsvinet	Denmark Fårup Summer Park	Family roller coaster	Zamperla	April 30
Polar X-plorer	Denmark Legoland Billund	Family roller coaster	Zierer	April 29
Shambhala: Expedición al Himalaya	Spain PortAventura Park	Hyper coaster	Bolliger & Mabillard	May 12
Skyrush	United States Hersheypark	Hyper coaster	Intamin	May 26
Superman: Ultimate Flight	United States Six Flags Discovery Kingdom	Launched roller coaster	Premier Rides	June 30
The Swarm	Thorpe Park	Wing Coaster	Bolliger & Mabillard	March 15
Tren de la mina	Spain Parque de Atracciones de Madrid	Family roller coaster	Gerstlauer	March 30
Verbolten	United States Busch Gardens Williamsburg	Launched roller coaster	Zierer	May 18
Vilde Mus	Denmark Dyrehavsbakken	Wild mouse	Mack Rides	March 29
Wild Eagle	United States Dollywood	Wing Coaster	Bolliger & Mabillard	March 24
Wodan Timbur Coaster	Germany Europa-Park	Wooden roller coaster	Great Coasters International	March 31
X-Flight	United States Six Flags Great America	Wing Coaster	Bolliger & Mabillard	May 16

==== Relocated ====
Name	Park	Type	Manufacturer	Opened	Formerly
Apocalypse	United States Six Flags America	Stand-up roller coaster	Bolliger & Mabillard	June 7	Iron Wolf at Six Flags Great America
Cliffhanger	United States Glenwood Caverns	Steel roller coaster	S&MC	June 15	Thunderbolt at Celebration City
Goliath	United States Six Flags New England	Giant Inverted Boomerang	Vekoma	May 25	Déjà Vu at Six Flags Magic Mountain
Stinger	United States Dorney Park & Wildwater Kingdom	Invertigo	Vekoma	April 28	Invertigo at California's Great America
Triops	France Parc Bagatelle	Invertigo	Vekoma	June 10	Tornado at Sommerland Syd
Wild West Express Coaster	United States Glenwood Caverns	Steel roller coaster	Zierer	May 25	Endicott Emerald Mine at Wild Zone Adventures
Western-Expressen	Norway TusenFryd	Sit Down roller coaster	Vekoma	April 28	Family Adventure at Mirabilandia

==== Refurbished ====
Name	Park	Type	Manufacturer	Opened	Formerly
Arkham Asylum – Shock Therapy	Australia Warner Bros. Movie World	Suspended Looping Coaster	Vekoma	April 7	Lethal Weapon – The Ride
Cosmic Coaster	United States Worlds of Fun	Junior roller coaster	Preston & Barbieri	April 14	Wacky Worm
The Barnstormer	United States Magic Kingdom	Junior roller coaster	Vekoma	March 12	The Barnstormer at Goofy's Wiseacre Farm
Escape from Madagascar	Australia Dreamworld	Suspended Family Coaster	Vekoma	March 31	Sky Rocket
Hoot N Holler	United States Darien Lake	Junior roller coaster	Zierer	May 12	Brain Teaser
Mr. Freeze: Reverse Blast	United States Six Flags Over Texas; United States Six Flags St. Louis	Launched roller coaster	Premier Rides	May 12; May 5	Mr. Freeze
Twisted Typhoon	United States Wild Adventures	Inverted roller coaster	Vekoma	2012	Hangman

=== Other attractions ===
==== New ====
Name	Park	Type	Opened
Adventure Alley	United States Six Flags Great Adventure	Themed area	April 5
Air Jumbo	United States Six Flags Great Adventure	Aerial carousel	May 23
Alpine Freefalls	United States Great Escape	ProSlide water slide complex	June 2
Angry Birds Land	Finland Särkänniemi	Themed area	June 8
Aquanura	Netherlands Efteling	Dancing fountain show	May 31
Bambooz River	France Walibi Rhône-Alpes	Log flume	Unknown
Big Red Boat	Australia Dreamworld	Rockin' Tug	December 14
Black Widow	United States Kennywood	Zamperla pendulum ride	June 8
Bonzai Pipeline	United States Six Flags St. Louis	ProSlide SuperLoop	May 26
Buena Vista Street	United States Disney California Adventure	Themed area	June 15
Burnout	Australia Funfields	Chance Rides Trabant	November 23
Cars Land	United States Disney California Adventure	Themed area	June 15
Celebrate the Magic	United States Magic Kingdom	Nighttime spectacular	November 13
Celebration Plaza	United States Cedar Point	Themed area	June 8
City	Malaysia Legoland Malaysia Resort	Themed area	September 15
Constrictor	Australia Wet'n'Wild Water World	WhiteWater West Family Constrictor water slide	September 28
Das verrückte Hotel Tartüff	Germany Phantasialand	Funhouse	June 23
Déjà Vu	United States Six Flags Great Adventure	Scrambler	May 23
Despicable Me Minion Mayhem	United States Universal Studios Florida	Infitec 3D simulator ride	July 2
Dinosaur Island	Australia Sea World	Dinosaur exhibit	June 16
Dinosaurs Alive!	Canada Canada's Wonderland; United States Cedar Point; United States Dorney Park & Wildwater Kingdom; United States Kings Dominion	Dinosaur exhibit	May 6 May 12; April 28; April 6
Disney Dreams!	France Disneyland Park (Paris)	Nighttime spectacular	April 1
Dragster H2O	United States Soak City: Cedar Point	Multi-lane racer	May 27
DreamWorks Experience	Australia Dreamworld	Themed area	March 31
Fender Benders	United States Six Flags Great Adventure	Bumper Cars	August 7
Geyser Gulch	China Hong Kong Disneyland	Water play area	July 13
Happy Swing	United States Waldameer & Water World	Zamperla Happy Swing 12 (motorized swing)	May 12
Ice Age: Dawn of the Dinosaurs	England Alton Towers; Italy Gardaland; Australia Warner Bros. Movie World; Germany Movie Park Germany	4D film	March 24; March 31; June 23; March 31
Imagination	Malaysia Legoland Malaysia Resort	Themed area	September 15
Justice League: Alien Invasion 3D	Australia Warner Bros. Movie World	Sally Corporation 3D Shooting Dark ride	September 22
King Cobra	United States Six Flags Hurricane Harbor: New Jersey	Polin King Cobra	July 24
Kingdom	Malaysia Legoland Malaysia Resort	Themed area	September 15
Kumba Twister	Germany Serengeti Park	Frisbee	March 24
Land of Adventure	Malaysia Legoland Malaysia Resort	Themed area	September 15
Lex Luthor: Drop of Doom	United States Six Flags Magic Mountain	Intamin Drop tower	July 7
Lost Kingdom Adventure	Malaysia Legoland Malaysia Resort	Interactive Dark Ride	September 15
Luigi's Flying Tires	United States Disney California Adventure	Flying Saucers attraction	June 15
Luminosity — Ignite the Night!	United States Cedar Point	Nighttime show	June 8
Mad T Party	United States Disney California Adventure	Nighttime Show	June 15
Madagascar Live! Prepare to Party	England Chessington World of Adventures	Live Show	March 31
Majaland	Germany Holiday Park	Themed area	June 26
Mammoth	United States Holiday World & Splashin' Safari	ProSlide water coaster	May 11
Mater's Junkyard Jamboree	United States Disney California Adventure	Unknown	June 15
Miniland	Malaysia Legoland Malaysia Resort	Themed area	September 15
Nemesis: Sub-Terra	England Alton Towers	ABC Drop Tower	March 24
New Fantasyland	United States Magic Kingdom	Themed area	December 6
New Test Track	United States Epcot	High speed simulated test track	December 6
Pandamonium	Australia Dreamworld	Air Race	December 21
Pirate Reef	United States Legoland California	Hopkins Shoot-the-Chutes	May 24
Quadzilla	United States Noah's Ark Water Park	Mat Slides	Unknown
Radiator Springs Racers	United States Disney California Adventure	Racing dark ride	June 15
Red Car Trolley	United States Disney California Adventure	Tram ride	June 15
RipTide	United States Morey's Piers	Pirate Ship	Summer 2012
Sky Jet	Germany Skyline Park	Pendulum ride	Unknown
SkyPoint Climb	Australia Q1	External building walk	January 14
SkyScreamer	United States Six Flags Fiesta Texas; United States Six Flags Great Adventure	Tower swinger	May 27; May 23
Sling Shot	United States Six Flags Magic Mountain	Funtime Sling Shot	December 15
Sparkler	United States Holiday World & Splashin' Safari	Tower swinger	May 11
Technic	Malaysia Legoland Malaysia Resort	Themed area	September 15
Teenage Mutant Ninja Turtles Shell Shock	United States Nickelodeon Universe	Gerstlauer Sky Fly	March 17
Texas Star Flyer	United States Galveston Island Historic Pleasure Pier	Tower swinger	July 27
Tidal Wave Bay	United States Soak City: Kings Island	Wave pool	May 27
Toy Story Midway Mania!	Japan Tokyo DisneySea	Interactive 4D ride	July 9
Transformers: The Ride 3D	United States Universal Studios Hollywood	Dark ride	May 24
Under the Sea: Journey of the Little Mermaid	United States Magic Kingdom	Omnimover dark ride	December 6
Universal's Cinematic Spectacular: 100 Years of Movie Memories	United States Universal Studios Florida	Nighttime spectacular	May 8
Universal's Superstar Parade	United States Universal Studios Florida	Parade	May 8
Vol Ultime	Canada La Ronde	Tower swinger	May 19
WindSeeker	United States Carowinds; United States Kings Dominion	Tower swinger	March 31; April 6

== Closed attractions & roller coasters ==
Name	Park	Type	Manufacturer	Closed
Cactus Coaster	United States Elitch Gardens	Family roller coaster	Allan Herschell Company	October 28
Disaster Transport	United States Cedar Point	Bobsled roller coaster	Intamin	July 29
Flashback	United States Six Flags Over Texas	Boomerang	Vekoma	September 3
Hurricane	United States Santa Cruz Beach Boardwalk	Hurricane	S.D.C.	September 3
Pandemonium	United States Six Flags Discovery Kingdom	Spinning roller coaster	Gerstlauer	January 1
Adventure Golf	United States Valleyfair	Mini Golf	Unknown	Unknown
Avalanche	Australia Dreamworld	Matterhorn	Bertazzon Rides	July 15
Catapult	United States Six Flags New England	Sky Swatter	S&S Worldwide	October 28
Congo River	United States Holiday World & Splashin' Safari	Lazy River	Unknown	Unknown
DreamWorks Holiday Shrektacular	Australia Dreamworld	Live show	Unknown	January 27
ElecTRONica	United States Disney California Adventure	Nighttime show	Walt Disney Imagineering	April 15
Familien-Achterbahn	Germany Eifelpark	Family roller coaster	Zierer	Unknown
Glow in the Park Parade	United States Six Flags Great America	Parade	—N/a	Unknown
Inferis	Italy Gardaland	Horror House	Unknown	January 6
Jaws	United States Universal Studios Florida	Water ride	MCA Planning and Development	January 2
Jet Star	Finland Särkänniemi	Steel roller coaster	Schwarzkopf	Unknown
Journey to the Center of the Earth 4-D Adventure	Australia Warner Bros. Movie World	4D film	Iwerks Entertainment	June 4
Jurassic Family Roller Coaster	Australia Luna Park Sydney	Family roller coaster	Unknown	January
KidZville	United States Kings Dominion	Themed area	—N/a	October
Leo-Express	Germany Serengeti Park	Calypso	Mack Rides	Unknown
Metropolis	Australia Luna Park, Melbourne	Galaxi	S.D.C.	Unknown
Perilous Plunge	United States Knott's Berry Farm	Shoot the Chute	Intamin	September 3
Raging Seas	United States Darien Lake	Seesturmbahn	Mack Rides	Unknown
Roller Soaker	United States Hersheypark	Suspended roller coaster	Setpoint	September 3
Rowdys Ridge	United States Darien Lake	3 rides		
Snow White's Scary Adventures	United States Magic Kingdom	Dark ride	Walt Disney Imagineering	May 31
Space Spiral	United States Cedar Point	Gyro tower	Von Roll	August 14
Star Jet	United States Casino Pier	Steel roller coaster	E&F Miler Industries	October 29
Star Tours	Japan Tokyo Disneyland	Motion simulator	Walt Disney Imagineering	April 2
Stingray	Australia Dreamworld	Trabant	Chance Rides	May
Sturmvogel	Germany Hansa-Park	Pendulum ride	Schwarzkopf	Unknown
T2-3D: Battle Across Time	United States Universal Studios Hollywood	4-D film	Universal Creative	December 31
Texas Chute Out	United States Six Flags Over Texas	Parachute Drop	Intamin	September 3
Thunder Alley	United States Kings Island	Go-karts	R.E. Enterprises	Unknown
Timber Tower	United States Dollywood	Topple Tower	HUSS	Unknown
Tree Top Racers	United States Adventure City	Wild Mouse	Miler Manufacturing	Unknown
Wheelie	United States Six Flags Over Georgia	Enterprise	Schwarzkopf	October 28
Wild Mouse	United Kingdom Flamingo Land Resort	Wild Mouse	Maurer Söhne	November 2
WindSeeker	United States Knott's Berry Farm	Wind Seeker	Mondial	September 19

== Themed Accommodation ==
=== New ===
Name	Park	Theme	Opening	ref(s)
Disney's Art of Animation Resort	Walt Disney World	Disney Animated Films	May 31	
Hotel Bell Rock	Europa-Park	New England	June 27	

== Amusement parks in terms of attendance ==
=== Worldwide ===
This section list the top 25 largest amusement parks worldwide in order of annual attendance in 2012.

Rank	Amusement park	Location	2012 Attendance
1	Magic Kingdom at Walt Disney World Resort	Lake Buena Vista, Florida, US	17,536,000
2	Disneyland at Disneyland Resort	Anaheim, California, US	15,963,000
3	Tokyo Disneyland	Tokyo, Japan	14,847,000
4	Tokyo DisneySea	Tokyo, Japan	12,656,000
5	Disneyland Park at Disneyland Paris	Marne-la-Vallée, France	11,200,000
6	Epcot at Walt Disney World Resort	Lake Buena Vista, Florida, US	11,063,000
7	Disney's Animal Kingdom at Walt Disney World Resort	Lake Buena Vista, Florida, US	9,998,000
8	Disney's Hollywood Studios at Walt Disney World Resort	Lake Buena Vista, Florida, US	9,912,000
9	Universal Studios Japan	Osaka, Japan	8,700,000
10	Islands of Adventure at Universal Orlando Resort	Orlando, Florida, US	7,981,000
11	Disney California Adventure at Disneyland Resort	Anaheim, California, US	7,775,000
12	Ocean Park Hong Kong	Hong Kong, China	7,436,000
13	Everland	Yongin, Gyeonggi-Do, South Korea	6,853,000
14	Hong Kong Disneyland	Hong Kong, China	6,700,000
15	Lotte World	Seoul, South Korea	6,383,000
16	Universal Studios Florida at Universal Orlando Resort	Orlando, Florida, US	6,195,000
17	Universal Studios Hollywood	Universal City, California, US	5,912,000
18	Nagashima Spa Land	Kuwana, Japan	5,850,000
19	SeaWorld Orlando	Orlando, Florida, US	5,358,000
20	Walt Disney Studios Park at Disneyland Paris	Marne-la-Vallée, France	4,800,000
21	Europa-Park	Rust, Germany	4,600,000
22	SeaWorld San Diego	San Diego, California, US	4,444,000
23	Busch Gardens Tampa Bay	Tampa, Florida, US	4,348,000
24	Efteling	Kaatsheuvel, Netherlands	4,200,000
25	OCT East	Shenzhen, China	4,196,000

== Poll rankings ==
=== Golden Ticket Awards ===
The 2012 Amusement Today Golden Ticket Awards were held at Dollywood in Pigeon Forge, Tennessee.

Category	2012 Recipient	Location	Vote
Best New Ride (Amusement Park)	Wild Eagle	Dollywood	
Best New Ride (Waterpark)	Mammoth	Holiday World & Splashin' Safari	
Best Amusement Park	Cedar Point	Sandusky, Ohio	
Best Waterpark	Schlitterbahn	New Braunfels, Texas	
Best Children's Park	Idlewild and Soak Zone	Ligonier, Pennsylvania	
Best Marine Life Park	SeaWorld Orlando	Orlando, Florida	
Best Seaside Park	Santa Cruz Beach Boardwalk	Santa Cruz, California	
Best Indoor Waterpark	Schlitterbahn Galveston Island	Galveston, Texas	
Friendliest Park	Dollywood	Pigeon Forge, Tennessee	
Cleanest Park	Holiday World & Splashin' Safari	Santa Claus, Indiana	
Best Shows	Dollywood	Pigeon Forge, Tennessee	
Best Food	Dollywood	Pigeon Forge, Tennessee	
Best Water Ride (Park)	Dudley Do-Right's Ripsaw Falls	Islands of Adventure	
Best Waterpark Ride	Wildebeest	Holiday World & Splashin' Safari	
Best Kids' Area	Kings Island	Mason, Ohio	
Best Dark Ride	Harry Potter and the Forbidden Journey	Islands of Adventure	
Best Outdoor Show Production	Epcot	Bay Lake, Florida	
Best Landscaping	Busch Gardens Williamsburg	Williamsburg, Virginia	
Best Halloween Event	Universal Orlando Resort	Orlando, Florida	
Best Christmas Event	Dollywood	Pigeon Forge, Tennessee	
Best Carousel	Knoebels Amusement Resort	Elysburg, Pennsylvania	
Best Indoor Coaster	Revenge of the Mummy	Universal Studios Orlando	
Best Funhouse/Walk-Through Attraction	Noah's Ark	Kennywood	

Top 10 Steel Roller Coasters
Rank	2012 Recipient	Park	Supplier	Points
1	Millennium Force	Cedar Point	Intamin	1272
2	Bizarro	Six Flags New England	Intamin	946
3	Nitro	Six Flags Great Adventure	B&M	650
4	Apollo's Chariot	Busch Gardens Williamsburg	B&M	597
5	New Texas Giant	Six Flags Over Texas	Rocky Mountain Construction	564
6	Expedition GeForce	Holiday Park	Intamin	537
7	Intimidator	Carowinds	B&M	520
8	Magnum XL-200	Cedar Point	Arrow	480
9	Goliath	Six Flags Over Georgia	B&M	444
10	Diamondback	Kings Island	B&M	395

Top 10 Wooden Roller Coasters
Rank	2012 Recipient	Park	Supplier	Points
1	El Toro	Six Flags Great Adventure	Intamin	1279
2	The Voyage	Holiday World & Splashin' Safari	The Gravity Group	1190
3	Phoenix	Knoebels Amusement Resort	PTC/Schmeck	1091
4	Thunderhead	Dollywood	GCI	1018
5	Boulder Dash	Lake Compounce	CCI	1009
6	Ravine Flyer II	Waldameer & Water World	The Gravity Group	762
7	The Beast	Kings Island	KECO	677
8	The Raven	Holiday World & Splashin' Safari	CCI	385
9	Shivering Timbers	Michigan's Adventure	CCI	378
10	Balder	Liseberg	Intamin	364

=== Best Roller Coaster Poll ===
Mitch Hawker's Best Roller Coaster Poll is yet to be held for 2012.

Top 10 Steel Roller Coasters
Rank	Name	Park	Location	Manufacturer	Debut Year
1	Expedition GeForce	Holiday Park	Germany	Intamin	2001
2	Bizarro	Six Flags New England	United States	Intamin	2000
3	New Texas Giant	Six Flags Over Texas	United States	Rocky Mountain Construction	1990
4	Intimidator 305	Kings Dominion	United States	Intamin	2010
5	Kawasemi	Tobu Zoo Park	Japan	Intamin	2008
6	Shambhala: Expedición al Himalaya	PortAventura Park	Spain	Bolliger & Mabillard	2012
7	Skyrush	Hersheypark	United States	Intamin	2012
8	iSpeed	Mirabilandia	Italy	Intamin	2009
9	Katun	Mirabilandia	Italy	Bolliger & Mabillard	2000
9	Maverick	Cedar Point	United States	Intamin	2007
9	Mega-Lite	Happy Valley Shanghai	China	Intamin	2009

== Records broken ==
Record name	Record attribute	Ride	Amusement Park	Date broken	
Amusement park with the most number of roller coasters	17 roller coasters		United States Six Flags Magic Mountain	May 2	(Note: Cedar Point has since removed WildCat resulting in their coaster count to drop to 16 and now Six Flags Magic Mountain has the lead with 17 coasters.)
World's Longest Water Coaster	1,763 feet (537 m)	Mammoth	United States Holiday World & Splashin' Safari	May 11	
World's Tallest Vertical Drop Ride	400 feet (120 m)	Lex Luthor: Drop of Doom	United States Six Flags Magic Mountain	July 7	

== See also ==
- List of roller coaster rankings
- Category:Amusement rides introduced in 2012
- Category:Roller coasters opened in 2012
- Category:Amusement rides closed in 2012
