= Texas Star Flyer =

Amusement ride

Coordinates: 29.2855°N 94.7895°W

Galveston Island Historic Pleasure Pier
- Status: Operating
- Opening date: July 27, 2012

Ride statistics
- Attraction type: Tower Swinger
- Manufacturer: Funtime
- Model: Star Flyer
- Height: 230 ft (70 m)
- Speed: 43 mph (69 km/h)
- Vehicles: 12
- Riders per vehicle: 2
- Duration: 2:00
- Height restriction: 48 in (122 cm)

Texas Star Flyer is a Funtime Star Flyer operating at Galveston Island Historic Pleasure Pier. The ride opened to the public on July 27, 2012. The ride was installed by Ride Entertainment Group, who handles all of Funtime's operations in North America.

== Ride ==
The ride is a Swing ride where riders soar in a 98-foot (30 m) circle at speeds over 43 miles per hour (69 km/h) up on a 230-foot (70 m) tall tower overlooking the park and the Gulf of Mexico, while going forwards and or backwards. First pieces of Texas Star Flyer arrived at the pier in the middle of January 2012.

Texas Star Flyer is similar to SkyScreamer that is found at several other Six Flags parks including Six Flags Fiesta Texas found in the same state of Texas. Once opened Texas Star Flyer was the tallest swing ride in Texas, until the Texas SkyScreamer opened at Six Flags Over Texas in May 2013.

== See also ==
- 2012 in amusement parks
- SkyScreamer, a series of Funtime Star Flyer Tower Swingers at Six Flags theme parks
