= Wild West Express Coaster =

Roller coaster in the United States

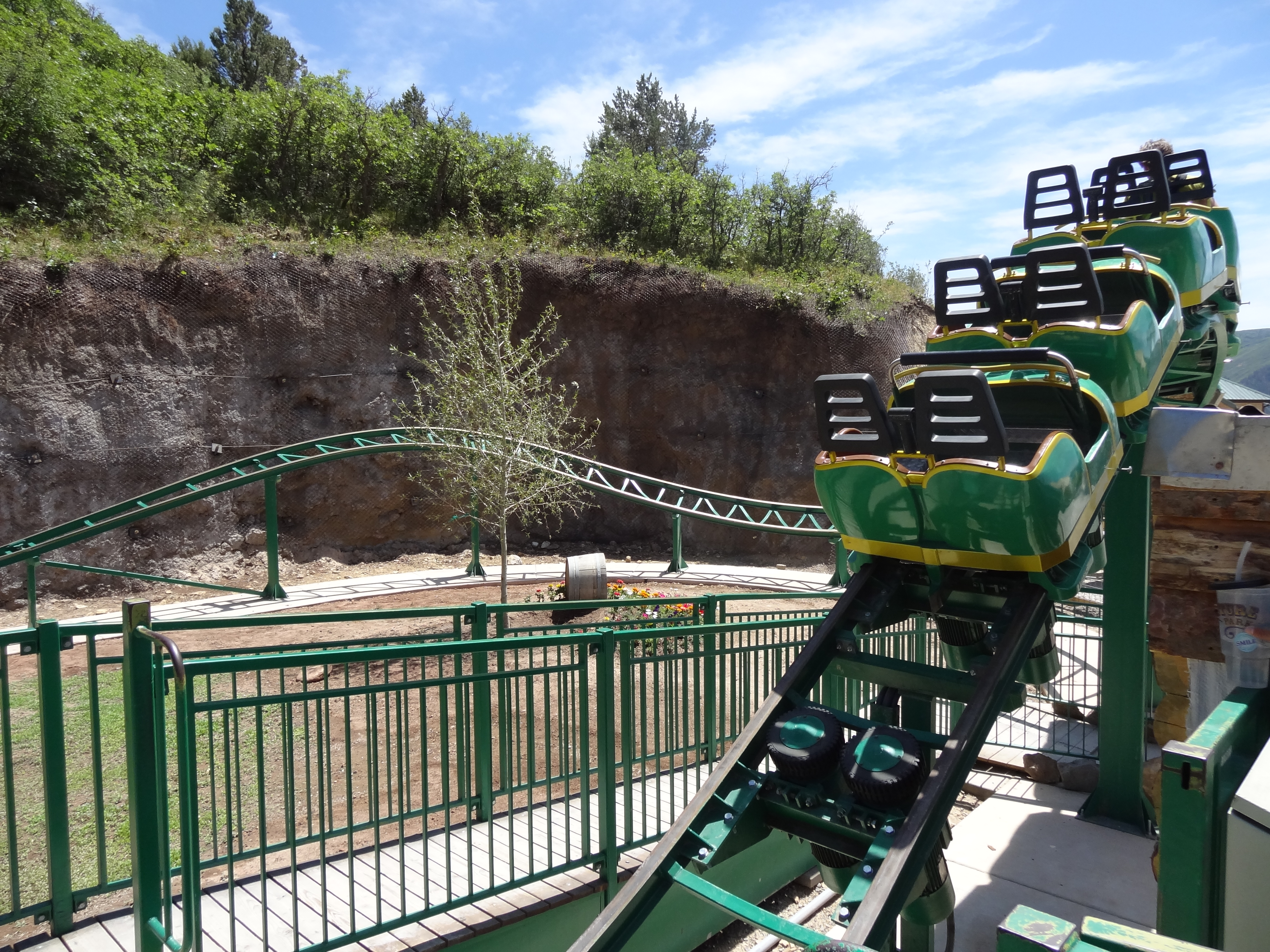

Glenwood Caverns Adventure Park
- Coordinates: 39.5614°N 107.3198°W
- Status: Operating
- Opening date: May 25, 2012; 13 years ago

Wild Zone Adventures
- Coordinates: 39°33′39.3″N 107°19′7.4″W
- Status: Removed
- Opening date: 1997; 29 years ago
- Closing date: June 30, 2009; 16 years ago

General statistics
- Type: Steel
- Manufacturer: Zierer
- Designer: Ing.-Büro Stengel GmbH
- Model: Tivoli
- Track layout: Oval
- Height: 10 ft (3.0 m)
- Length: 197 ft (60 m)
- Speed: 16 mph (26 km/h)
- Inversions: 0
- Capacity: 600 riders per hour
- Wild West Express Coaster at RCDB

Wild West Express Coaster is a steel roller coaster operating at Glenwood Caverns Adventure Park in Glenwood Springs, Colorado. Wild West Express Coaster opened to the public at Glenwood Caverns Adventure Park on May 25, 2012.

== History ==
=== Wild Zone Adventures ===
Originally opened at Wild Zone Adventures in Chatham, Ontario as Endicott Emerald Mine. The coaster was also called Runaway Mine Train. On June 30, 2009, Wild Zone Adventures was donated to Municipality of Chatham-Kent for funds to build a brand new entertainment center and also to be transformed into a Holiday Inn.

=== Glenwood Caverns Adventure Park (2012) ===
On February 20, 2012, Glenwood Caverns Adventure Park went before the Garfield Board of County Commissioners to be able to add several new attractions in the future. Then on February 29, 2012, Glenwood Caverns Adventure Park announced several new attractions set to open in late spring 2012 including Wild West Express Coaster.

== See also ==
- 2012 in amusement parks
