= Iron Shark =

Steel roller coaster

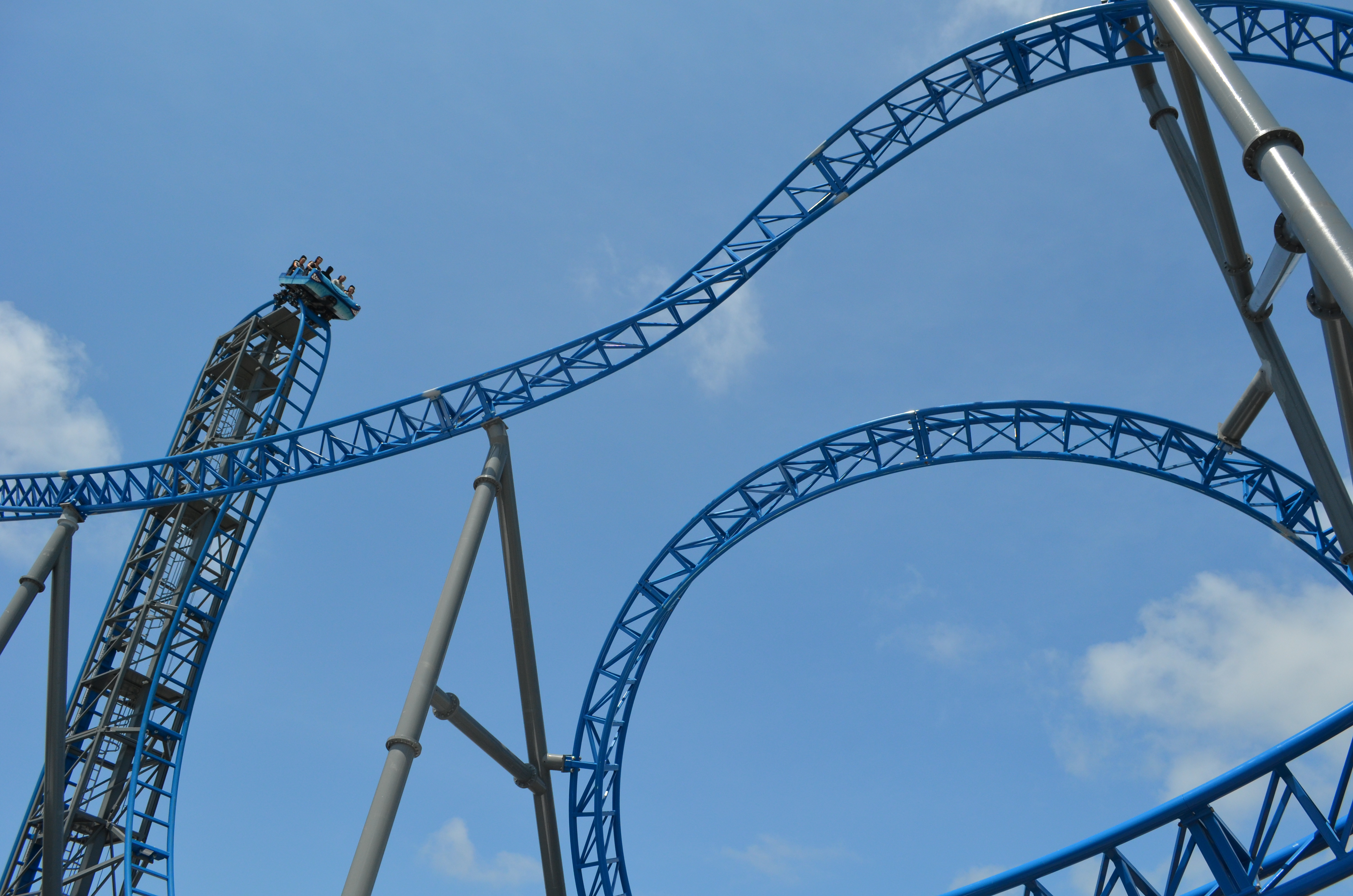

Galveston Island Historic Pleasure Pier
- Location: Galveston Island Historic Pleasure Pier
- Coordinates: 29.285839°N 94.789523°W
- Status: Operating
- Opening date: June 1, 2012

General statistics
- Type: Steel
- Manufacturer: Gerstlauer
- Model: Euro-Fighter (Iron Shark)
- Lift/launch system: Vertical chain lift hill
- Height: 100 ft (30 m)
- Length: 1,246 ft (380 m)
- Speed: 52 mph (84 km/h)
- Inversions: 4
- Duration: 1:00
- Restraint style: Lap bar
- Height restriction: 48 in (122 cm)
- Trains: 3 trains with a single car; riders arranged 4 across in 2 rows for a total of 8 riders per train
- Iron Shark at RCDB

Iron Shark is a steel roller coaster at Galveston Island Historic Pleasure Pier. The Gerstlauer Euro-Fighter roller coaster opened to the public on June 1, 2012. Iron Shark was the first Euro-Fighter coaster in Texas. The ride was installed by Ride Entertainment Group, who handles all of Gerstlauer's operations in the Western Hemisphere.

== Ride ==
Iron Shark is a Euro-Fighter by German company Gerstlauer. The roller coaster stands 100 feet (30 m) above the pier with some parts of the roller coaster standing over the Gulf of Mexico. The ride features 4 inversions.

The ride begins with a slight left turn out of the station. It then proceeds up a 100-foot (30 m) vertical lift hill. After peaking the hill, the ride enters into a beyond vertical drop at 95 degrees. The train then enters an Immelmann loop followed by a dive loop. A short stretch of high speed "S" curves lead the train into a cutback followed by an inclined loop. As the train completes the inclined loop, it reaches the brake run. The ride then features the last 180 degree turn into the station.

== Incidents ==
In May 2026, eight students were trapped when their train halted short of the top of the initial lift hill. They were rescued three hours later by firefighters using an arial ladder.

== See also ==
- 2012 in amusement parks
