= Swing ride =

Type of amusement ride

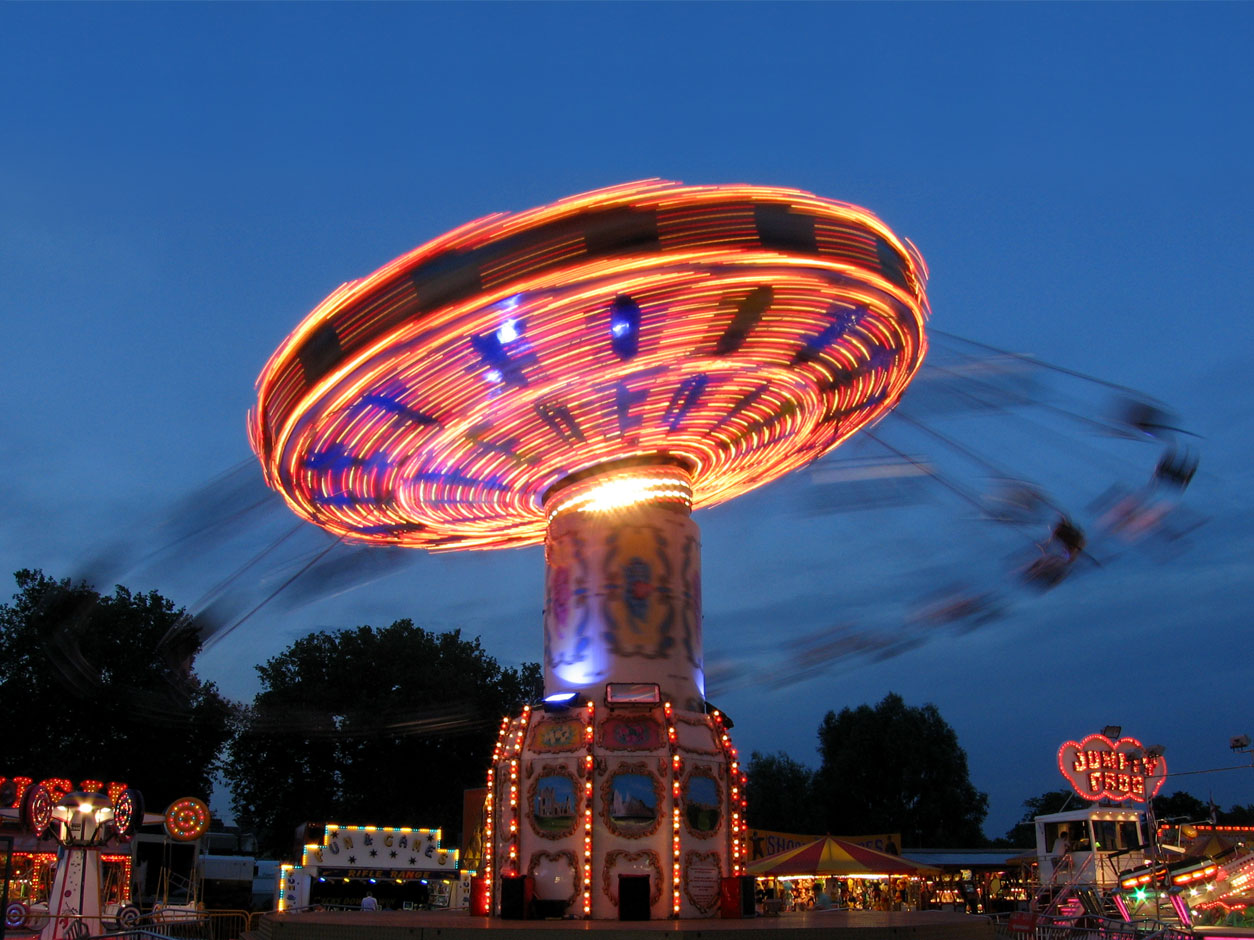
A Chair-O-Planes ride with a tilting top

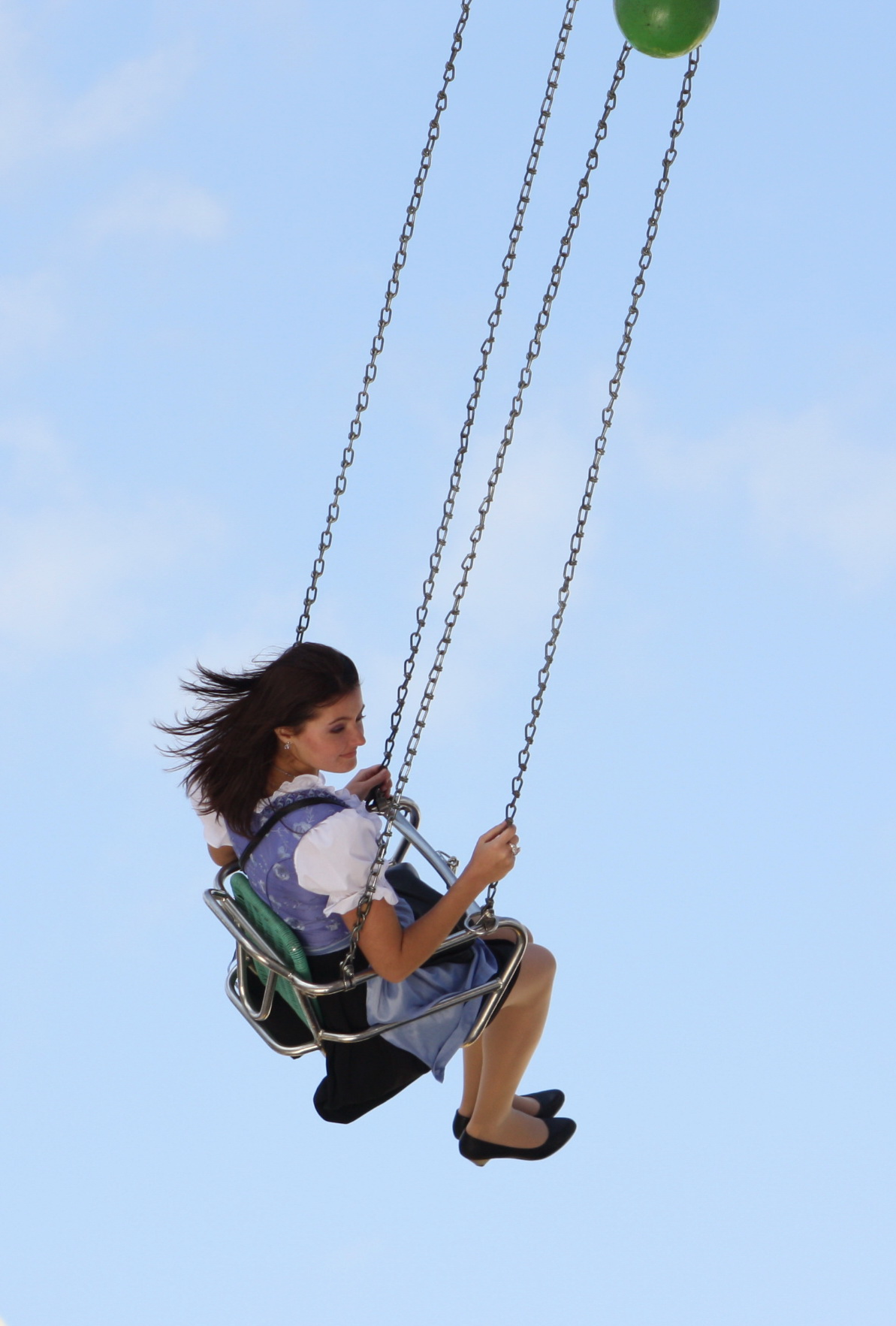
A woman on a swing ride at the Oktoberfest in Munich, Germany

Video of "Slänggungan" at Liseberg, Gothenburg, Sweden

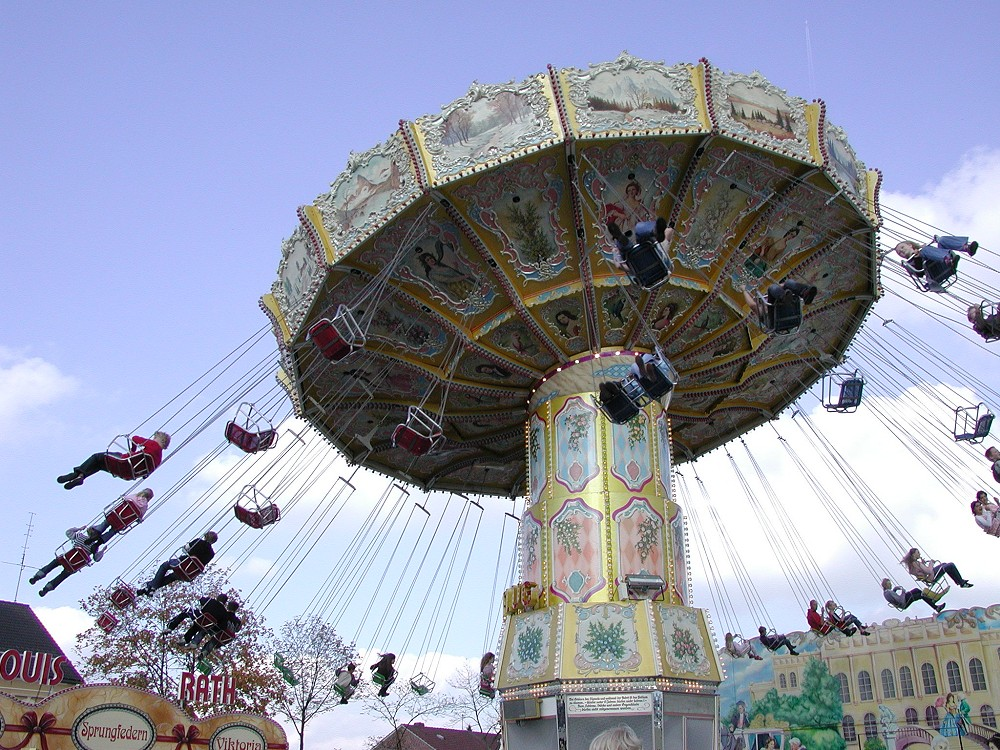
Chair-O-Planes or "Kettenkarussell" (chain-carousel) at the Roonkarker Mart fair, Germany

The swing ride or chair swing ride (sometimes called a swing carousel, wave swinger, yo-yo, waver swinger, Chair-O-Planes, Dodo or swinger) is an amusement ride that is a variation on the carousel in which the seats are suspended from the rotating top of the carousel as it spins around. On some versions, particularly on the Wave Swingers, the rotating top of the carousel also tilts for additional variations of motion.

== History ==
Hollycombe Steam Collection has a chair-o-planes adapted from a bomb damaged roundabout in 1944.

A Chair-O-Planes premiered in Germany in 1972, designed by Zierer and built by Franz Schwarzkopf, brother of Anton Schwarzkopf. In 1974 the first portable unit debuted under the same partnership. Since then Zierer has built about 200 units. Other manufacturers have followed creating their own versions of the Chair-O-Planes, including Zamperla, Chance Rides, Grover Watkins, Bertazzon, Preston & Barbieri, Vekoma, and Sanoyas Hishino Meisho.

In the late 2000s, Austrian manufacturer Funtime developed the world's first tower swinger, known as the Star Flyer. Mondial followed with their WindSeeker, leading to a lawsuit between the two companies. Zamperla also sells a Vertical Swing.

== Locations ==
=== Europe ===
==== Austria ====
The Prater Turm located in the Wurstelprater in Vienna opened in 2010 at a height of 117 metres (384 ft).

==== Denmark ====
The Star Flyer, located in Tivoli Gardens, Copenhagen, affords sweeping views of the city's historical centre. The Swing Carousel also located in Tivoli Gardens Copenhagen.

==== France ====
Les Chaises Volantes in Walibi Sud-Ouest is a Zierer model from 1987 which was relocated to the park in 1992.

==== Germany ====
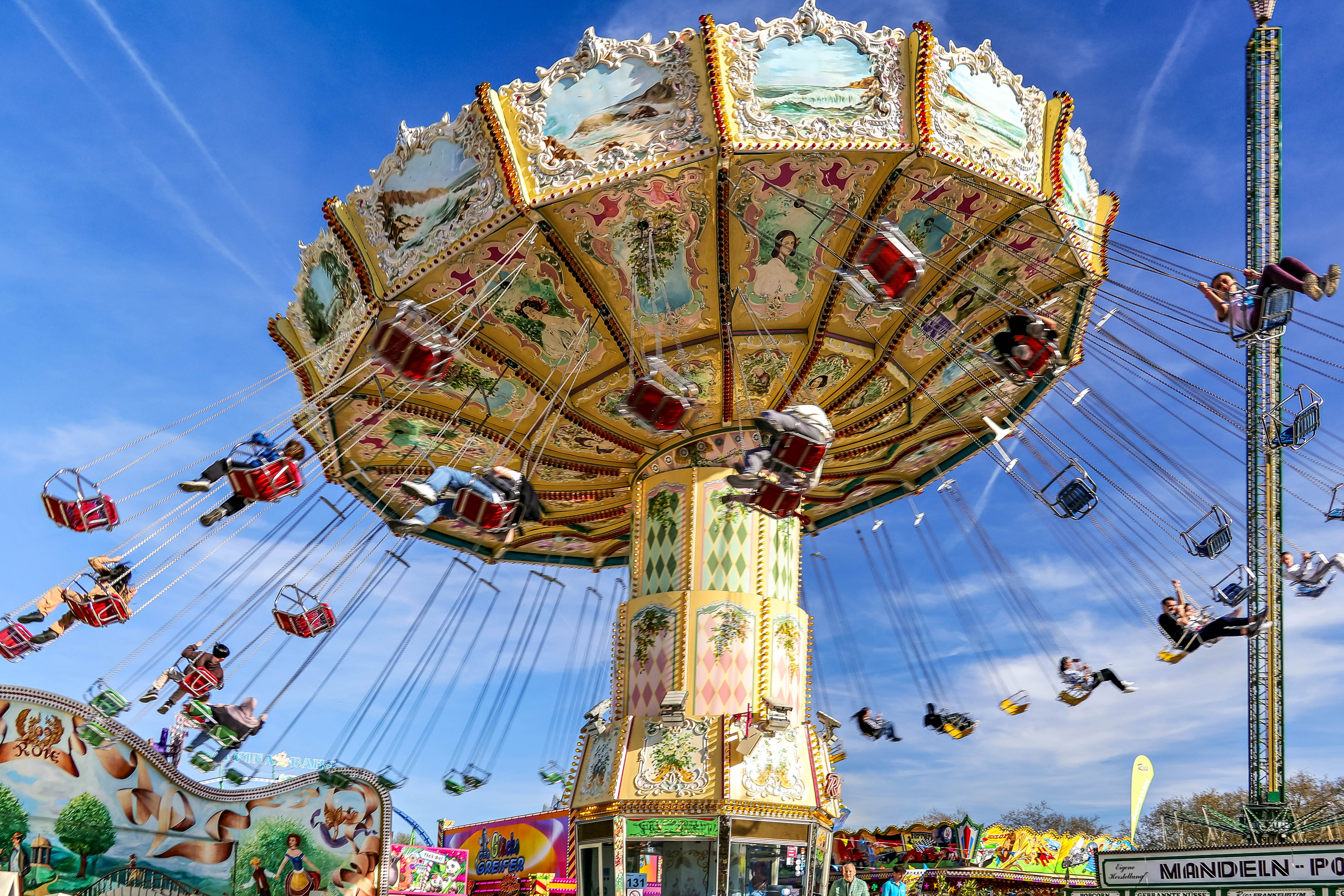
Wellenflug on Frankfurter Dippemess

In Germany, swing rides are often found on fairs, Volksfests like the Oktoberfest and traveling funfairs. But swing rides are also common in amusement parks. Most of the German swing rides are from Zierer.

Some of these include:

- Africa Swing – Safariland Stukenbrock (Wooddesign Amusement Rides BV)
- Fliegenpilz – Eifelpark (Zierer)
- Flying Carousel – Wunderland Kalkar (Zamperla)
- Himmelsstürmer – Taunus Wunderland (Zierer)
- La Ola – Heide Park (Zierer)
- Kettenflieger – Fränkisches Wunderland
- Kettenflieger – Hansa-Park Wooddesign Amusement Rides BV
- Kettenkarussell – Ritter Rost Magic Park Verden
- Kettenkarussell – Schwaben Park
- Kettenkarussell – Skyline Park (Zierer)
- Königsflug – Bayern-Park (Zierer)
- Pier Side Carousel – Movie Park Germany (Zierer)
- Sea Swing – Movie Park Germany (Zamperla)
- Wellenflieger – Fort Fun Abenteuerland (Zierer)
- Wellenflieger – Freizeit-Land Geiselwind (Zierer)
- Wellenfliegerpilz – Erlebnispark Steinau an der Straße (Zierer)
- Wellenflug – Holiday Park (Wooddesign Rides B. V.)
- Wellenflug – Phantasialand (Zierer)
- Wiener Wellenflieger – Europa-Park (Zierer)
- Wirbelpilz – Erlebnispark Tripsdrill (Zierer)
- Zonga Kettenflieger – Serengeti Park (SBF Visa)

==== Italy ====
In Italy, most swing rides travel with fairs. The ride is called "Seggiolini volanti" ("Flying chairs") or "calcinculo", which literally means "kick in the bottom". Two people sit in contiguous seats, and the one sitting behind kicks or pushes their partner higher in the air, in order to reach a "tail" suspended beyond normal reach at a point in the ride's rotation. Any individual who manages to grab the tail wins a free ride.

==== Netherlands ====
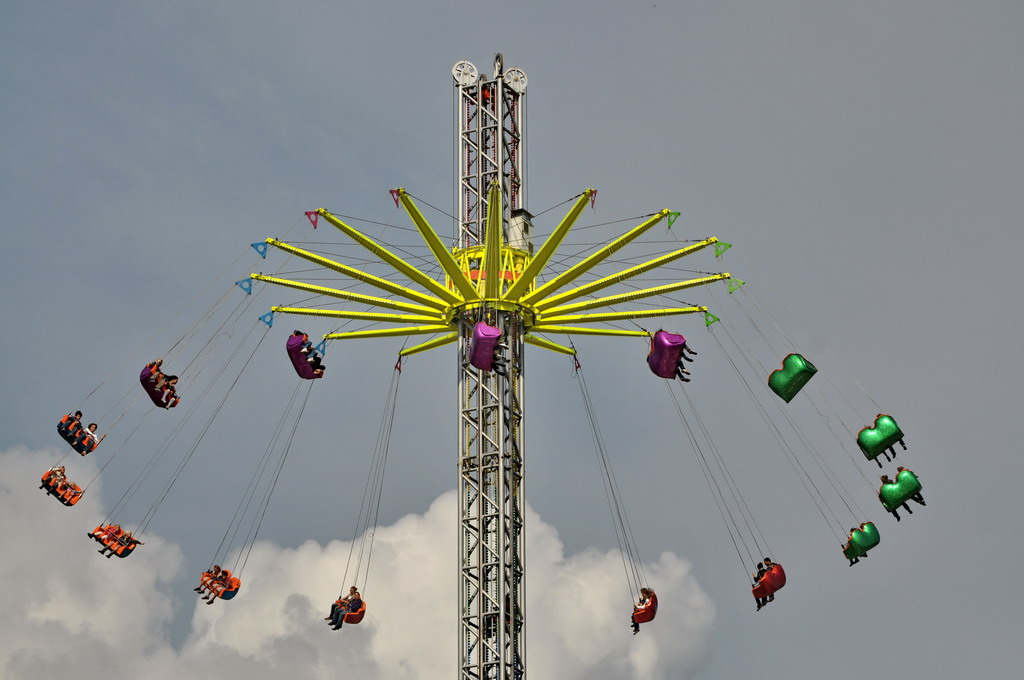
Around the World on Kermis Malieveld

Attractiepark Slagharen located the same Chair-O-Plane as Loundoun Castle.

Some Swing rides in the Netherlands:

- Djinn – Toverland (Wooddesign Rides B. V.)
- K3 Slingermolen – Plopsa Indoor Coevorden
- Kettenflug Apollo – Attractiepark Slagharen (Schwarzkopf)
- Piraat Enterhaak! – Avonturenpark Hellendoorn (Zierer)
- Super Swing – Walibi Holland (Zierer)

==== Norway ====
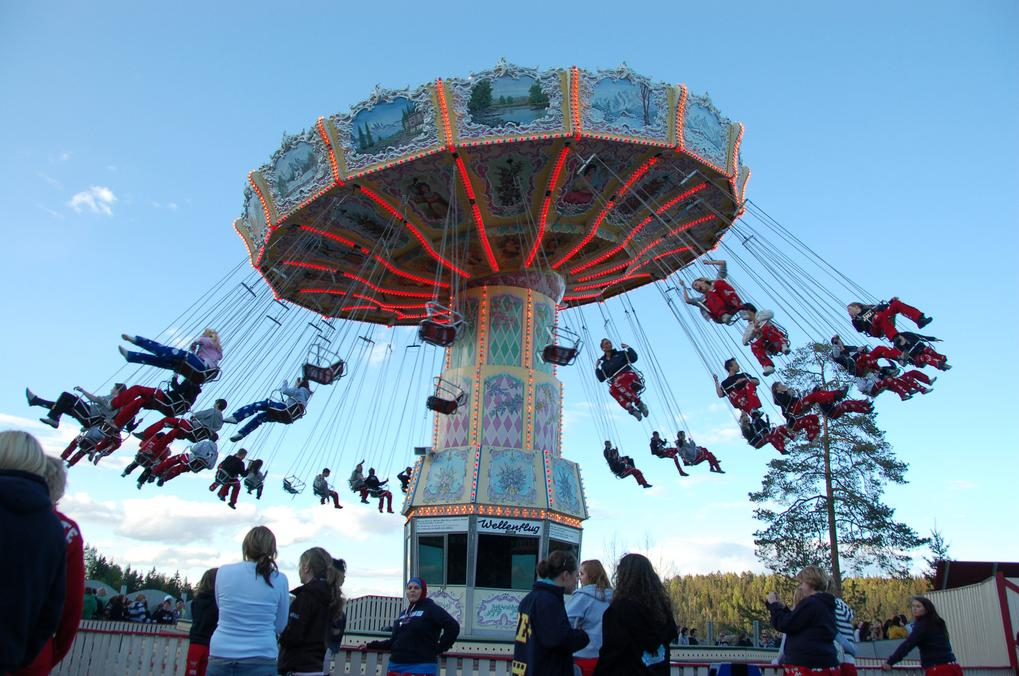
Sverrehusken a Wellenflieger at TusenFryd (Norway) in 2011

The second-largest amusement park within the Nordic countries is Tusenfryd (lit. “daisies”), located 10 kilometres (6.2 mi) outside the capital city Oslo, Norway. Tusenfryd features a Wellenflieger called Sverrehusken (“swear the chairs”) that has been in-operation since 1988. Sverrehusken was the first ride of its kind in the Nordic countries.

At Kongeparken (lit. ‘the royal park’), located 10 km outside the third-largest city in Norway, Stavanger, is a Wellenflieger named Spinnvidle (“spin-wheel”) that has been in-operation since 2012. Spinnvidle is the first of its kind in Norway with double seats.

==== Sweden ====
The Swedish name for Swing ride is Slänggunga or Kättingflygare. At Gröna Lund, Stockholm, a swing ride with the name "Eclipse" can be found. With its 121.9 metres (400 ft), it shares the "world's second tallest" title with SkyScreamer in Texas, North America.

The biggest amusement park in the Nordic countries is Liseberg, in Sweden's second largest city Gothenburg. Liseberg is the home of a Swing ride named "Slänggungan".

==== Spain ====
- Diavolo – Tibidabo (Zierer)
- Fumanchú (Defunct) – Port Aventura (Zierer)
- Los Ícaros – Terra Mítica (Zierer)
- Sillas Voladoras – Parque de Atracciones de Madrid (Zierer)
- Sillas Voladoras de Mr. Freeze – Parque Warner Madrid (Zierer)
- Star Flyer – Parque de Atracciones de Madrid (Funtime)
- Vertical Twister – Parque de Atracciones de Zaragoza (Zamperla)

==== United Kingdom ====
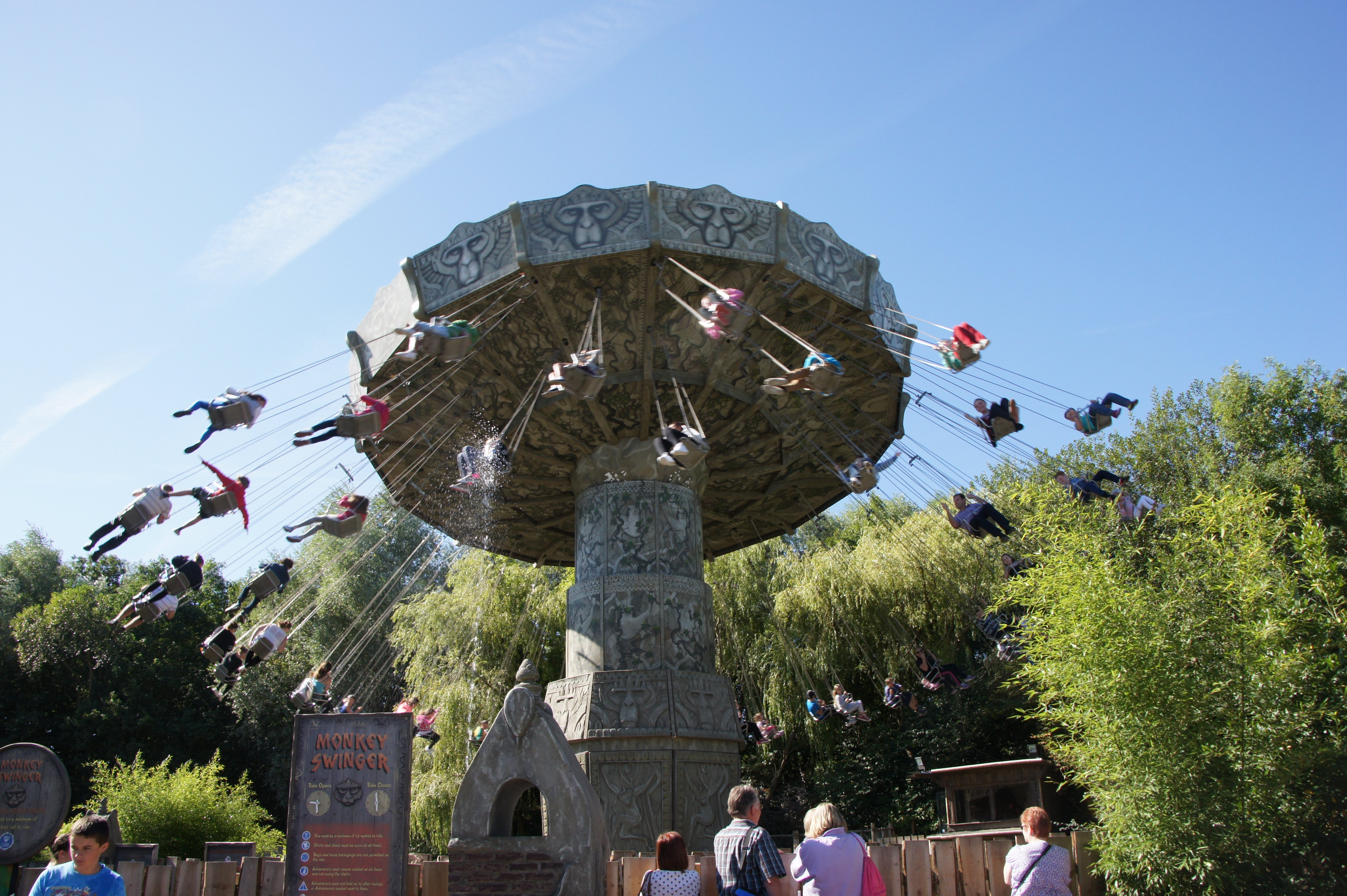
Monkey Swinger with water fountains at Chessington World of Adventures

Loudoun Castle Theme Park in Scotland claimed that its moon-shaped ride, "The Plough", was the largest Chair-O-Plane in the world. The Plough was originally called Apollo 14 and was owned by the Bembom family, operating in their Ponypark Slagharen in the Netherlands during the late seventies. It had gondolas travelling around the outside of the ride. When moved to Dreamland in England (then called "Bembom Brothers"), it was reconstructed into a Chair-O-Plane and named Heatwave. Leaving Dreamland, it opened in Lightwater Valley in 1998 where it operated until 2003 when Henk Bembom moved Heatwave to his new park, Loudoun Castle, where it was renamed "The Plough" and painted green. The park has been closed since 2010.

Until 2016, there was a Chair-O-Plane ride at Alton Towers in Staffordshire. Called Twirling Toadstool it was set in a fantasy themed area of the park called Cloud Cukoo Land, it was themed as a giant mushroom. This was formerly themed as a prehistoric dinosaur-type ride and located in an area called Ug Land.

You can also find a Chair-O-Plane at Carters Steam Fair which is one of the largest vintage travelling funfairs including some steam driven rides. Their ride's past is a little patchy but is thought to have been built in Germany in the 1920s and imported to Britain with a blank canvas. It's generally the case that British roundabouts run clockwise, whereas their Continental and American counterparts run anti-clockwise. The Chair-o-Plane certainly runs the right direction to be a British-built ride, but it may have been adapted by an early owner.

Adventure Island has a Chair-O-Plane called Archelon, which was themed to the extinct species of turtle of the same name.

Chessington World of Adventures is home to a monkey-themed Chair-O-Planes, named the "Monkey Swinger", that squirts water at riders. This formerly had a theme based on Billy Whizz of The Beano.

Paultons Park is also home to a Chair-O-Planes called "The Sky Swinger". This ride opened in 2008 and is a Zierer model.

Butlins is home to three Chair-O-Planes, one at each site, located at Butlins Minehead, Butlins Bognor Regis, and Butlins Skegness. Butlins Minehead is home to a Zierer Wave Swinger, and the other two resorts manufacturers are unknown.

=== North America ===
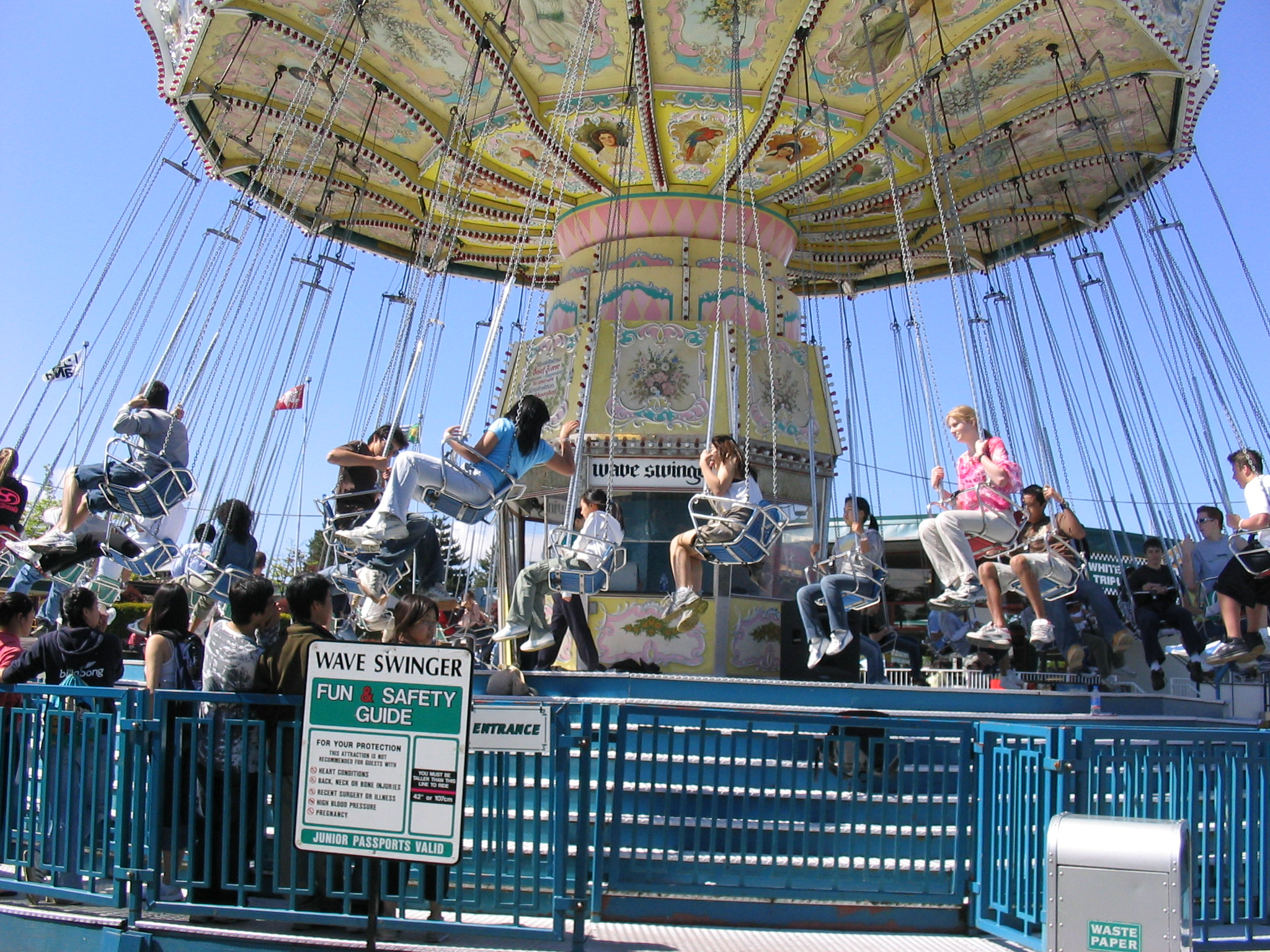
Wave Swinger ride at Playland, Vancouver, BC, Canada.

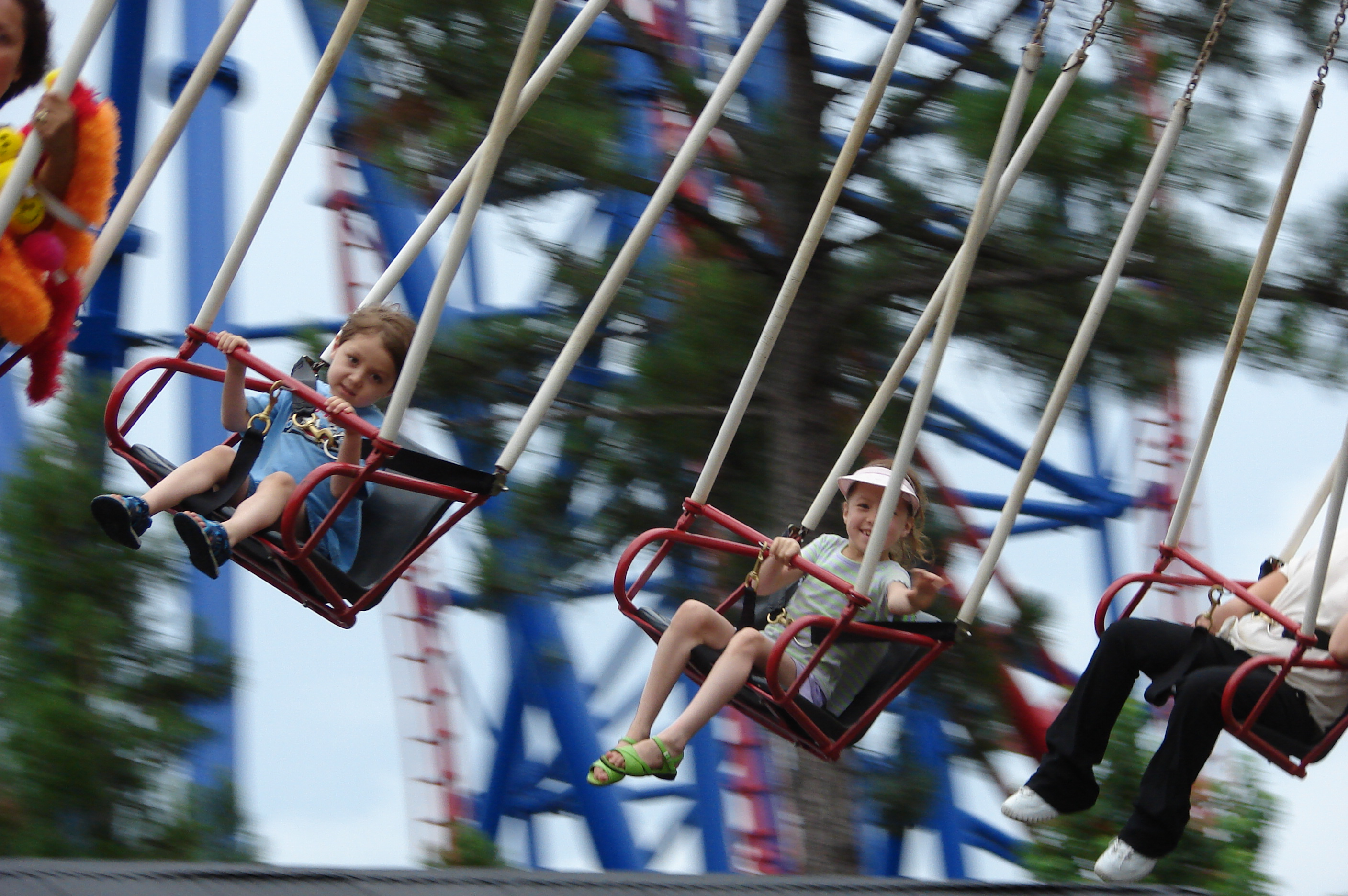
The Gunslinger ride at Six Flags Over Texas.

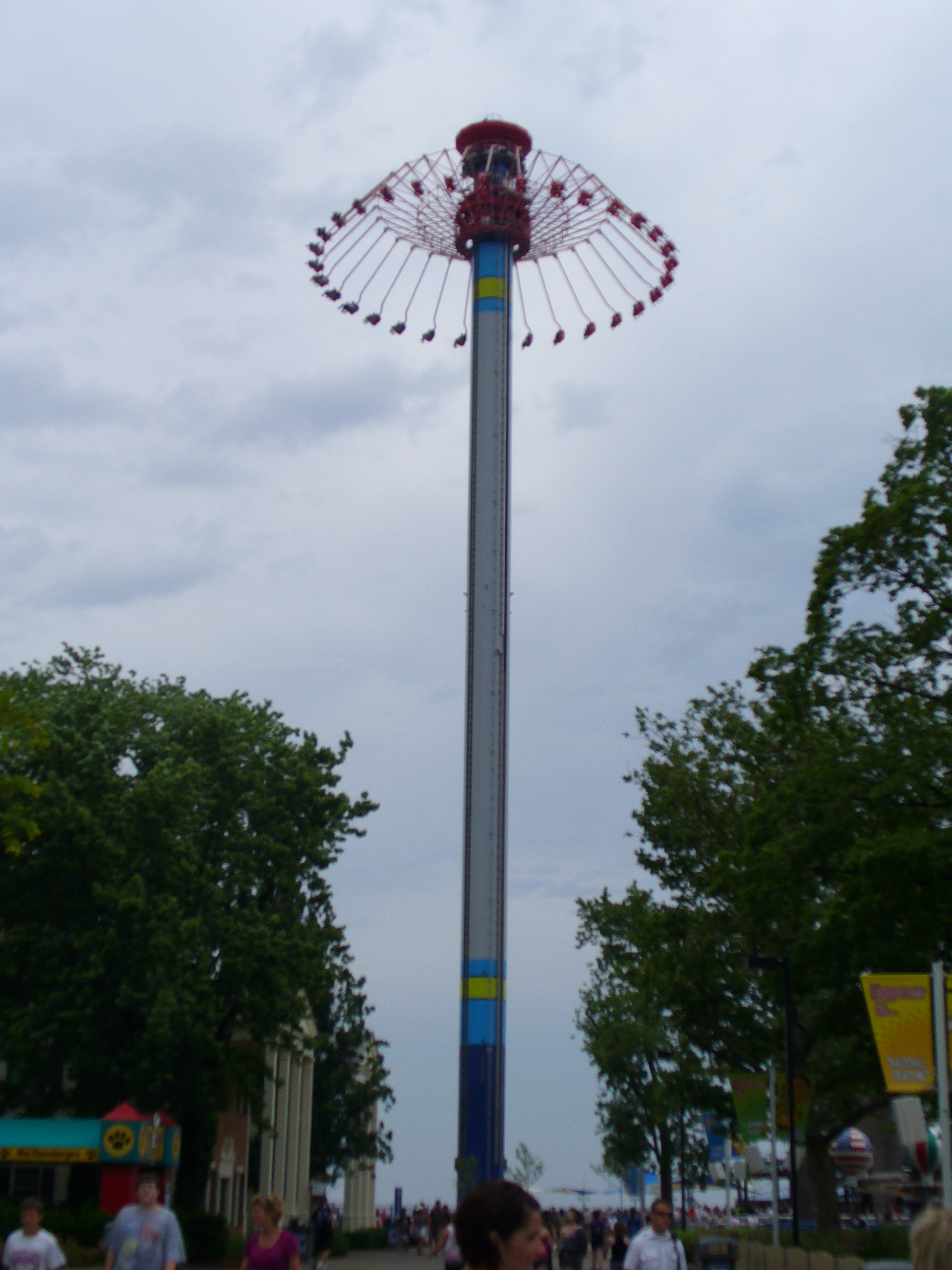
The 301-foot WindSeeker is found at several Cedar Fair parks; above is at Cedar Point, Sandusky, OH.

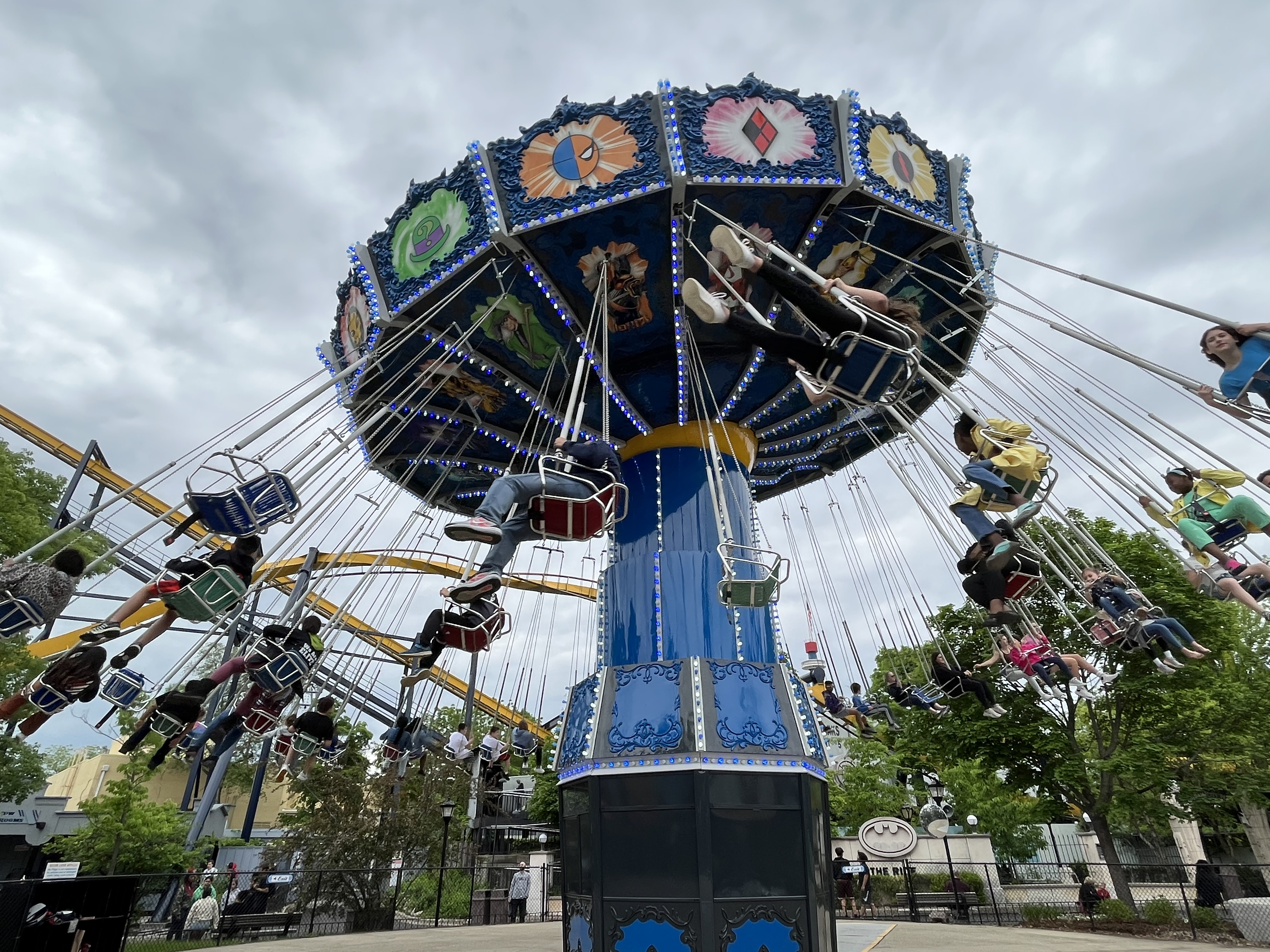
DC Super-Villains Swing is located at several Six Flags parks; pictured is of Six Flags Great America, Gurnee, IL.

Most of the traditional-style swing carousel rides in North America are found in amusement parks, as well as at many seasonal fairs and carnivals. They are usually made by Zierer (which calls the ride ‘Wave Swinger’), although some are made by Bertazzon (which calls the ride ‘Swing Carousel’) or Zamperla (which calls it ‘Flying Carousel’ or ‘Lollyswings’).

In recent years, many American amusement parks have opened towering (and considerably more thrilling) models, such as the WindSeeker (by Mondial) or the Sky Screamer (by SNS). These high-thrill swing rides are normally a minimum of 100 feet (30.48 m) tall, with several even surpassing 200’ (60.96 m). The Texas and New England Six Flags parks have Sky Screamers measuring 400’ (121.92 m).

North American swing rides include:

- Aunt Kelsey's Apple Tree Swing - Vala's Pumpkin Patch
- Aviator – Kemah Boardwalk
- Bluegrass Breeze – Beech Bend Park (Bertazzon)
- Charlie Brown's Wind Up – Kings Island (Zamperla)
- Crime Wave – Six Flags New England (Zierer)
- Crow's Nest (Formerly Sparkler) – Holiday World & Splashin' Safari (Zamperla Vertical Swing)
- Backyardigans Swing-Along – Nickelodeon Universe (Zierer)
- Da Vinci's Dream – Canobie Lake Park
- DC Super-Villains Swing – Six Flags Over Georgia (Zierer)
- DC Super-Villains Swing – Six Flags Fiesta Texas (Zierer)
- DC Super-Villains Swing – Six Flags Great America (Zierer)
- der Werbelwind – Busch Gardens Williamsburg (Zierer)
- Dream Machine – Calaway Park (Moser)
- Elmo's Cloud Chaser – Sesame Place (Zamperla)
- Eye of the Kraken – Swampy Jack's Wongo Adventure (ARM)
- Fiesta Swing – Wonderland Amusement Park (Chance Rides)
- Flying Carousel – Park at OWA (Zamperla Flying Carousel)
- Flying Swings – Waldameer & Water World (Zamperla)
- Flying Trapeze - Funtown Splashtown USA (Chance Rides)
- Freedom Flyer – Park at OWA (Zamperla Vertical Swing)
- Gulf Glider – Galveston Island Historic Pleasure Pier (Bertazzon)
- The Gunslinger – Six Flags Over Texas (Chance Rides)
- HallowSwings – Holiday World & Splashin' Safari (Zamperla Flying Carousel)
- Italian Trapeze – Knoebels (Zamperla)
- Lasso – Six Flags Darien Lake (Zierer)
- Lolly Swing – South Florida Fair (Zamperla)
- Vertigo – South Florida Fair (ARM)
- New England SkyScreamer – Six Flags New England (Funtime)
- North Star – Valleyfair (Funtime)
- Seaswings – Santa Cruz Beach Boardwalk (Bertazzon)
- Silly Symphony Swings – Disney California Adventure Park (Zierer)
- Skycatcher – Kentucky Kingdom (ARM Rides)
- SkyScreamer – Six Flags Discovery Kingdom (Funtime)
- SkyScreamer – Six Flags Great Adventure (Funtime)
- SkyScreamer – Six Flags Over Georgia (Funtime)
- SkyScreamer – Six Flags St. Louis (Funtime)
- Texas SkyScreamer – Six Flags Over Texas (Funtime)
- SteelHawk – Worlds of Fun (Mondial)
- Storm Chaser – Adventureland (Iowa) (Mondial)
- Supergirl Sky Flight – Six Flags Fiesta Texas (Funtime)
- Supergirl Sky Flight – Six Flags México (Funtime)
- Swashbuckler – Six Flags Magic Mountain (Chance)
- Swing Carousel – Silver Dollar City (Bertazzon)
- Swing of the Century – Galaxyland (Zierer)
- Swing of the Century – Canada's Wonderland (Zierer)
- Swings Over Del Mar – Universal Kids Resort (Funtime)
- Flying Swinger - Old Town (Zamperla) (Removed)
- Texas Star Flyer – Galveston Island Historic Pleasure Pier (Funtime)
- Tour de Ville – La Ronde (Zamperla)
- Turn of the Century – Elitch Gardens (Zierer)
- Turn of the Century – Lagoon Amusement Park (Zierer)
- Vol Ultime – La Ronde (Funtime)
- Waltzing Swinger – Dollywood (Bertazzon)
- Wave Swinger – Cedar Point (Zierer)
- Wave Swinger – Magic Mountain (Zierer)
- Wave Swinger – Dorney Park & Wildwater Kingdom (Zierer)
- Wave Swinger – Funtastic
- Wave Swinger – Six Flags Discovery Kingdom (Zierer)
- Wave Swinger – Six Flags Great Adventure (Zamperla)
- Wave Swinger – Hersheypark
- Wave Swinger – Lake Winnepesaukah
- Wave Swinger – Adventureland (New York) (Zierer)
- Wave Swinger – Kennywood (Zierer)
- Wave Swinger – Kings Dominion (Zierer)
- Wave Swinger – Knott's Berry Farm (Zierer)
- Wave Swinger – Lake Compounce (Zierer)
- Wave Swinger – Playland
- Wave Swinger – South Florida Fair 2005–2009
- Wave Swinger – Saudi Amusement, Dammam KSA
- Wave Swinger – Seabreeze Amusement Park
- Wave Swinger – Strates Shows (Zierer)
- Wave Swinger – J&J Amusements Zierer
- Wave Swinger – Bengtson Pumpkin Farm Homer Glen, Illinois
- Wave Swinger – J&J Amusements Zierer
- Whirligig – Six Flags Fiesta Texas (Zierer)
- Whirligig – Six Flags Great America (Zierer)
- WindSeeker – Canada's Wonderland (Mondial)
- WindSeeker – Carowinds (Mondial)
- WindSeeker – Cedar Point (Mondial)
- WindSeeker – Kings Dominion (Mondial)
- WindSeeker – Kings Island (Mondial)
- Yo Yo – Alabama Splash Adventure (Chance Rides)
- Yo Yo – South Florida Fair (Chance Rides)
- Yo Yo – Family Kingdom Amusement Park (Chance Rides)
- Yo Yo – West Coast Amusements
- Yo-Yo – Fun Spot USA (Chance Rides)
- Yo-Yo – Quassy Amusement Park (Chance Rides)
- Zephyr – Kings Island (Zierer)
- Vertigo – South Florida Fair and West Palm Fair (ARM)
- Zweefmolen – Dutch Village, Holland, Michigan
- Yo-Yo - Select Shows LTD (Chance Rides)

=== South America ===
- Trukis Di Pinguim – Hopi Hari (Vinhedo, São Paulo, Brazil)
- Vertical Swing – Mundo Aventura Bogota, Colombia
- Fly Over – Fantasilandia, Santiago, Chile
- Sillas Voladoras – Salitre Mágico Bogota, Colombia

=== Asia and Oceania ===
- Unknown – Luna Park (Yerevan, Armenia)
- Unknown (Zierer) – Yerevan Park (Yerevan, Armenia)
- Ontang-anting – Taman Impian Jaya Ancol (Dunia Fantasi) (Jakarta, Indonesia)
- Flying Fiesta – Philippines (Enchanted Kingdom)
- Cyclone – Adventure Island (New Delhi, India)
- Vòng xoay thần tốc – Đầm Sen Park (Vietnam)
- The Thunderbirds – Dream World (Thailand)
- Silly Swirly – Universal Studios Singapore (Sentosa, Singapore)

==== Australia ====
- The Wave Swinger - OCS Fun Sydney Royal Easter Show
- Volare – Luna Park Sydney (Preston & Barbieri)
- Wave Swing – Royal Adelaide Show
- The Dreamworld Flyer – Dreamworld

==== New Zealand ====
- Chair-o-Plane – Mahons Amusements (Carnival Ride Operator)

==== Malaysia ====
- Spinner – Genting Highlands (Genting Highlands Theme Park)

Spinner had dismantled when the Genting Outdoor Theme Park closed since 1 September 2013 to make way for the world's first 20th Century Fox World, which was completed by 2021.

=== Africa ===
==== South Africa ====
- Wave Swing – Gold Reef City

== Popular culture ==
The Metalocalypse episode "Motherklok" features a Wave Slinger.

A Chair-O-Planes is featured on the cover of Dave Matthews Band's 1994 album Under the Table and Dreaming. The liner note credit lists the site of this photo as Sandusky, Ohio, which is the location of Cedar Point.

In John Updike's short story "You'll Never Know Dear How Much I Love You" he mentions a WhirloGig.

At the end of the Lilo & Stitch: The Series episode "Short Stuff", Experiment 297, a crab-like alien who was accidentally enlarged by his creator Jumba Jookiba's growth ray and given the name "Shortstuff", has the ability to swivel his body from the waist up. He was allowed to stay at his enlarged size by being employed as a living swing ride for a carnival as his "one true place".

The 2022 film Swing Ride (Italian title: 'Calcinculo'), directed by Chiara Bellosi, is a coming of age story set in the world of travelling fairs. It recounts the friendship between a young girl seeking to escape her family and a transgirl from a family of show people. Its title is a play on the Italian name for Swing-Rides (Calcinculo "kick up the arse"), and refers both to the ride and to the blows and setbacks that girls receive during adolescence.
