= Galveston Island Historic Pleasure Pier =

Pier in Galveston, Texas, United States

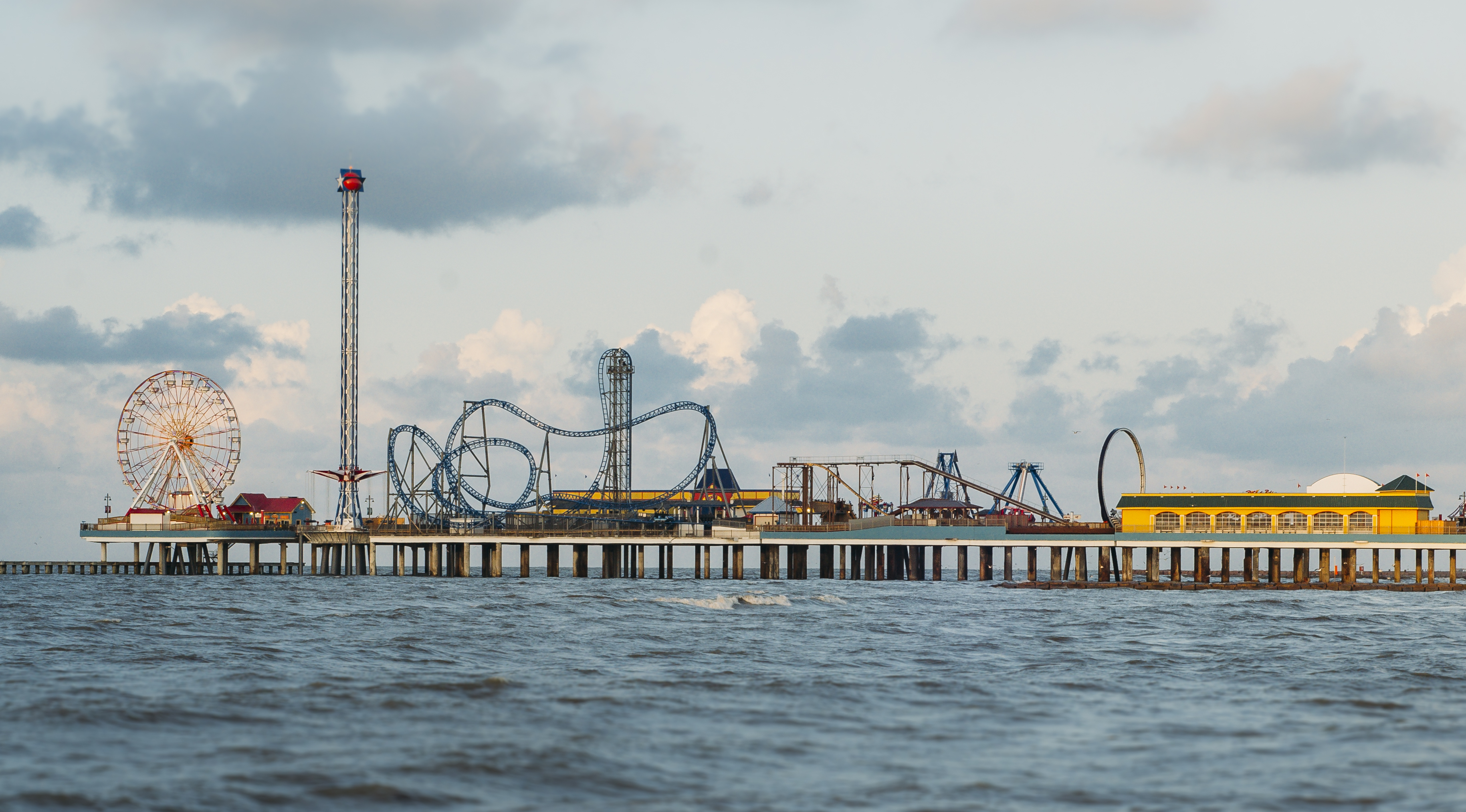
- Interactive map of Galveston Island Historic Pleasure Pier
- Location: Galveston, Texas, United States
- Coordinates: 29.286614°N 94.789910°W
- Opened: May 25, 2012
- Owner: Landrys, Inc.

Attractions
- Total: 16
- Roller coasters: 1
- Website: http://www.pleasurepier.com/

Galveston Island Historic Pleasure Pier is a pleasure pier in Galveston, Texas, United States. Opened in the summer of 2012, it has a roller coaster, 15 rides, carnival games and souvenir shops.

== History ==
The new Galveston Island Historic Pleasure Pier was built 1,130 feet (340 m) out over the Gulf of Mexico waters. It had its "soft" opening on May 25, 2012.

The new pier complex is located where the original Pleasure Pier stood from 1943 until 1961, when it was destroyed by Hurricane Carla. The original Pleasure Pier featured rides, an arcade, an aquarium, concessions, a large ball room, named the Marine Ballroom, and fishing at the end of the pier. It was also the site of the USS Flagship Hotel, an over-the-water hotel built in 1965 that was demolished after Hurricane Ike in 2008.

Before the renovation there had been almost no maintenance in over 70 years, resulting in the pier having exposed reinforcing steel with accelerated corrosion and concrete spalling at piles, beams, joists, and reflective overhead flat plates. Because of this, extensive structural concrete restoration was needed. Repairs were eventually completed using shotcrete struck and finished in alignment with pre-existing materials making up the pier.

The pier was a filming location for the 2021 comedy-drama Red Rocket.

The pier was also featured in the 2022 animated comedy Beavis and Butt-Head Do the Universe.

== Attractions ==
Concept art of the park.

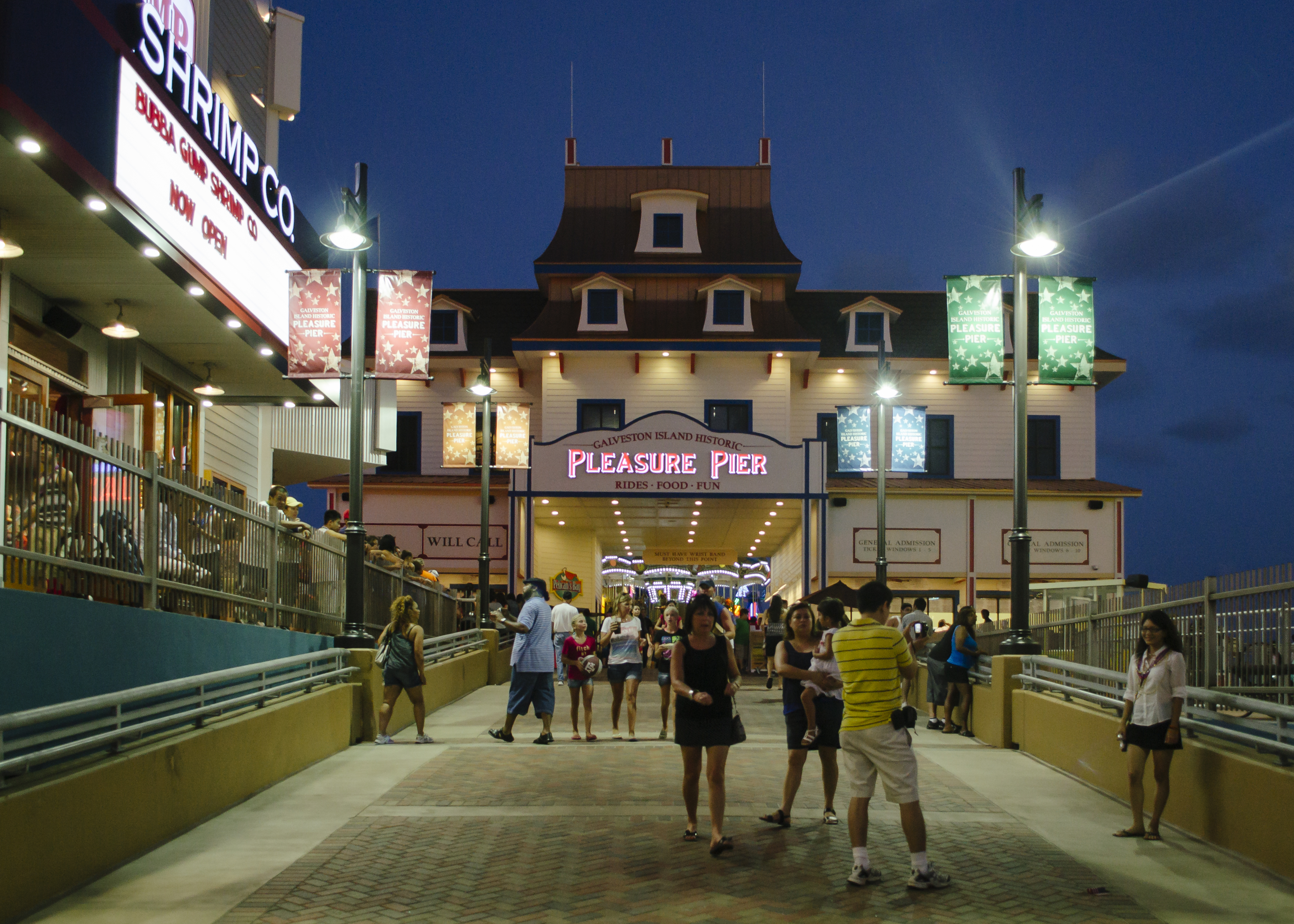
Pleasure Pier entrance

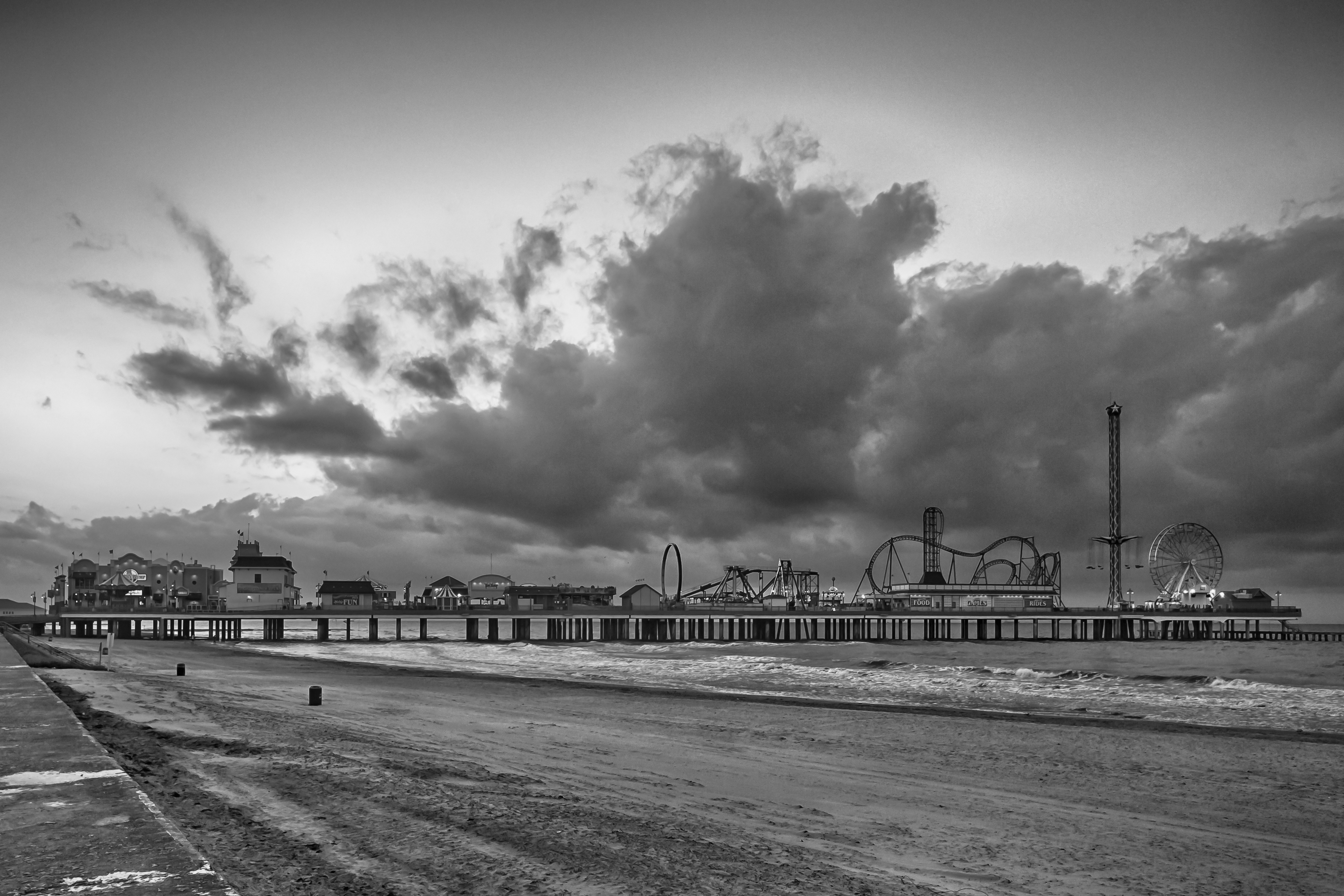
The new Pleasure Pier in 2012

Features at the Galveston Island Historic Pleasure Pier include:

- Iron Shark — a steel roller coaster constructed by Gerstlauer, a 100 feet (30 m) tall coaster offering four inversions with a back section cantilevering over the water.
- Sky Shooter — airborne shot ride.
- Texas Star Flyer — swinging riders over the water 230 feet above the Gulf.
- Galaxy Wheel — a 100-foot-tall Ferris wheel, featuring programmable LED lights.
- Bubba Gump Shrimp Company restaurant.

=== Current Attractions ===
Ride Name	Year Opened	Manufacturer	Ride Type
Big Wheelin'	2012		
Carousel	2012	Chance Rides	36' Double Decker Carousel
Cyclone	2012	Larson International	Fireball
Frog Hopper	2012	S&S Worldwide	Kiddie Ride
Galaxy Wheel	2012	Chance Rides	Ferris Wheel Ride
Gulf Glider	2012	Zierer	Wave Swinger Ride
Iron Shark	2012	Gerstlauer	Euro-Fighter
Lil' Captain Wheel	2012	SBF Visa	Kiddie Wheel 6
Pharoah's Fury	2005	Chance Rides	Pharoah's Fury
Pier Pileup	2012	Bertazzon Rides /	Bumper cars
Pirate's Plunge	2012	Interlink	Log Flume
Revolution	2012	Chance Rides	Revolution 20
Rock N Roll	2012	Bertazzon Rides	Rock-N-Roll Matterhorn
Sea Dragon	2012	Chance Rides	Pharaoh's Fury Ride
Sky Shooter	2012	SBF Visa	Airborne Shot 10
Texas Star Flyer	2012	FunTime Industries	Star Flyer
Texas Tea Cups	2012	Zamperla	Tea Cups
Wonder Wheel	2012	Zamperla	Kiddie Ferris Wheel

== See also ==
- 2012 in amusement parks
