= Parque de Atracciones de Madrid =

Amusement park in Madrid, Spain

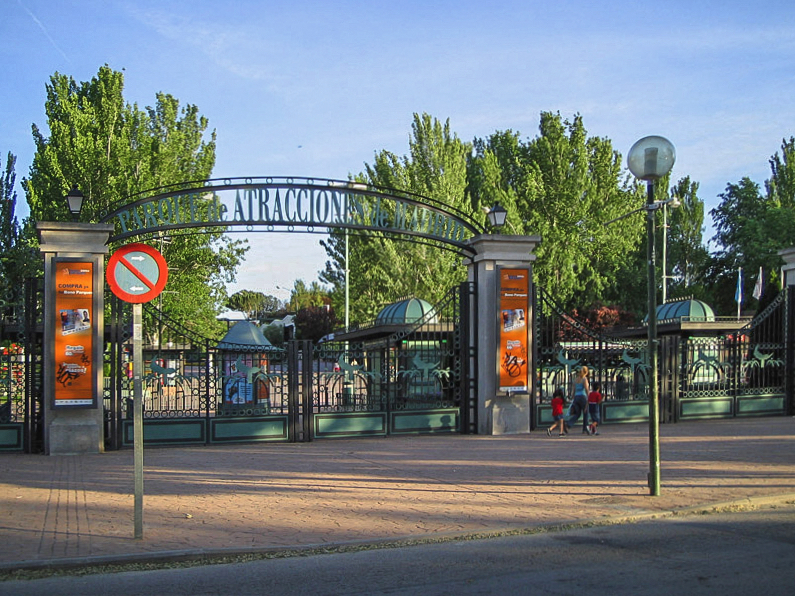
- Park’s principal entrance.
- Interactive map of Parque de Atracciones de Madrid
- Location: Madrid, Community of Madrid, Spain
- Coordinates: 40°24′40.64″N 3°45′6.44″W
- Opened: 15 May 1969
- Owner: Madrid City Council
- Operated by: Parques Reunidos
- General manager: Diego Gracia Lovaco
- Attendance: 1.347 million (2010)
- Area: 20 ha (49 acres)

Attractions
- Total: 36
- Roller coasters: 7
- Water rides: 3
- Website: parquedeatracciones.es

Parque de Atracciones de Madrid (in English: Madrid’s Amusement Park) is a 20-hectare (49-acre) amusement park located in the Casa de Campo in Madrid (Spain). Opened in 1969, it is the third-oldest operating amusement park in Spain behind Parc d'Atraccions Tibidabo (opened in 1901) and Parque de Atracciones Monte Igueldo (opened in 1911). It is the flagship park of Parques Reunidos, which operates the park under Madrid municipal government concession until 2039.

== History ==
The park was opened in 1969 by Carlos Arias Navarro. Initial attractions included El Tobogán, Los Coches de Choque, El Laberinto de Espejos, El Valle de la Prehistoria, El Pulpo and Jet Star. Since then it has undergone a number of remodels, with some attractions closing or being replaced and news ones opening. In 1990 the northwest zone opened with the attractions Condor, T.I.R, Aserradero, Sillas Voladoras and later Minimotos. Katapult roller coaster was also introduced that year.

In 1998, a major remodelling of the park was carried out at a cost of 8,000 million pesetas (48 million euros). The work included dividing the park into 5 zones and adapting the appearance and name of each attraction to match their respective zone. The park was also decorated, more souvenir shops added and the number of shows increased.

Originally, the park had a mascot called Napy, who appeared on the park tickets. He was a bear characterized and dressed in a jacket and beret with a white handkerchief around his neck. After the remodelling in 1998, Napy was replaced by Trasto, an orange alien similar to a bear with a T inside a circle on its stomach. Trasto was used in promotions and appeared on a TV program called CyberClub, but was phased out by 2007 and not replaced.

In March 2010, the Tree-cafe which forms part of the logo was dismantled and replaced with an attraction called Star Flyer. The park logo was also changed as a result.

Access to the park was originally by one of two tickets; one that permitted access to the park and use of the attractions and another that permitted access to the park and unlimited use of most of the attractions for one day. Since 2012, the entrance ticket included the use of most of the attractions.

Since 2008, the park has more than 350 employees, approximately 2.2 million visitors per year and 39 attractions.

== Zones ==
The park has four different zones. The Tranquilidad zone's "Gran Avenida" area opened in April 2012. The park's newest zone, Nickelodeon Land, opened in April 2014.

=== Tranquilidad ===
The park's timid area, with family attractions and areas that are available for relaxation.

- Attractions
  - La Jungla: A water raft tour, in which guests enter a jungle and encounter animatronics and water effects.
  - Zeppelin: A monorail attraction in which guests are mounted on Zeppelins and take a tour of the area.
  - Star Flyer: An 80-meter high Wave Swinger attraction.
  - Simulador Virtual: A 4D Cinema
- Shows
  - TWD Experience 'Dark Session'
  - The Walking Dead Experience
  - Asylum (Only halloween)
  - Salida Zombie (Only halloween)
  - El laberinto (Only halloween)
- Food & Drink
  - La Plaza
  - Gran Avenida

=== Maquinismo ===
The area where guests can experience adrenaline and thrill-centric attractions.

- Attractions
  - Sillas Voladoras: A classic Wave Swinger attraction.
  - Tornado: Inverted roller coaster of Intamin, reaches 30 meters high and speeds 80km/h, has 3 inversions.
  - Tifón: A Mega Disk'O attraction that opened in 2008.
  - La Lanzadera: A drop tower attraction that rises to 63 meters.
  - La Máquina: A frisbee ride from Huss that opened in 1997.
  - Tarántula: A Maurer rides spinning coaster with 25 meters high and speeds of 70km/h.
  - Rotor: A "condor"-styled spinning attraction.
  - Abismo: A Maurer rides "SkyLoop XT450"-type roller coaster, in which guests experience G-forces of intensity 4 and a 105km/h fall from a height of 46 meters that guests climb vertically.
  - Top Spin: A Huss-designed thrill attraction.
  - Aserradero: A Flume ride attraction.
- Shows
  - Horror Cinema "Director's Cut" (Only halloween)
  - El viejo caserón
  - El coro de los duendes (Only christmas)
- Food & Drink
  - Horno Dulcería
  - Granizados Abismo: Slushies and drinks.
  - El Congelador
  - Domino's Pizza
  - El Templete

=== Naturaleza ===
The greenest area of the park, where guests can ride multiple roller coasters and water attractions.

- Attractions
  - Cine 4D: Cinema 4D with film projections with holographic technology.
  - Los Fiordos: A water ride in a flume style boat.
  - Los Rápidos: An 800 meter long whitewater "tub raft".
  - Vértigo: Wild Mouse type roller coaster with a length of 370m and speeds of 45km/h.
  - Tiovivo: Carousel.
  - TNT - Tren de la mina: 17.5m high roller coaster that reaches 55 km/h.
- Shows
  - Nosferatu
  - Encuentro Mágico con los Reyes Magos (Only Christmas).
- Food & Drink
  - Granizados Vértigo: Slushies and drinks.
- Shops
  - Area de caramelos: Candy shop.

=== Nickelodeon Land ===
The park's newest zone. This area opened in 2014 and is themed to a variety of Nickelodeon franchises, including SpongeBob SquarePants, Jimmy Neutron, and Rugrats.

- Attractions
  - Padrinos Voladores: A Zamperla type "Air Force 5" roller coaster for children in which riders zig-zag in airplane-shaped ride vehicles. Themed to The Fairly OddParents series.
  - Patrulla Canina: A Zamperla family roller coaster in which guests travel 80 meters and 4 meters high. Themed to the Paw Patrol franchise.
  - Splash Bash: A water attraction themed to the SpongeBob SquarePants franchise.
  - Coches de Choque: A bumper cars attraction for children. Themed to the Rugrats franchise.
  - Hero Spin: A spinner ride themed to the SpongeBob SquarePants franchise.
  - Los Globos Locos: A family attraction themed to Boots from the Dora the Explorer franchise.
  - TMNT Driving School: A driving attraction themed to Nickelodeon's Teenage Mutant Ninja Turtles series.
  - Cazamedusas de Patricio: A spinner ride themed to Patrick Star from the SpongeBob SquarePants franchise.
  - La Aventura de Dora: A slow-moving attraction in Jeep-esque ride vehicles, themed to the Dora the Explorer franchise.
  - Nickelodeon Express: A people mover-style attraction that features a variety of Nickelodeon characters on the sides of the ride vehicles.
  - Al Bosque con Diego: A "crazy bus"-style attraction themed to the Go, Diego, Go! series.
  - Magneto de Jimmy Neutron: A drop-tower ride themed to the Jimmy Neutron franchise.
- Shows
  - La Banda de los Muertos (Only on Halloween)
  - Dark Cabaret (Only on Halloween)
  - Patrulla Canina
  - Personajes Nickelodeon
- Food & Drink
  - Nickelodeon Snack
  - Nickelodeon Café
- Shops
  - Nickelodeon Café
  - Nickelodeon Shop

== See also ==
Parque Warner Madrid
