= SkyScreamer =

Series of rides at multiple theme parks

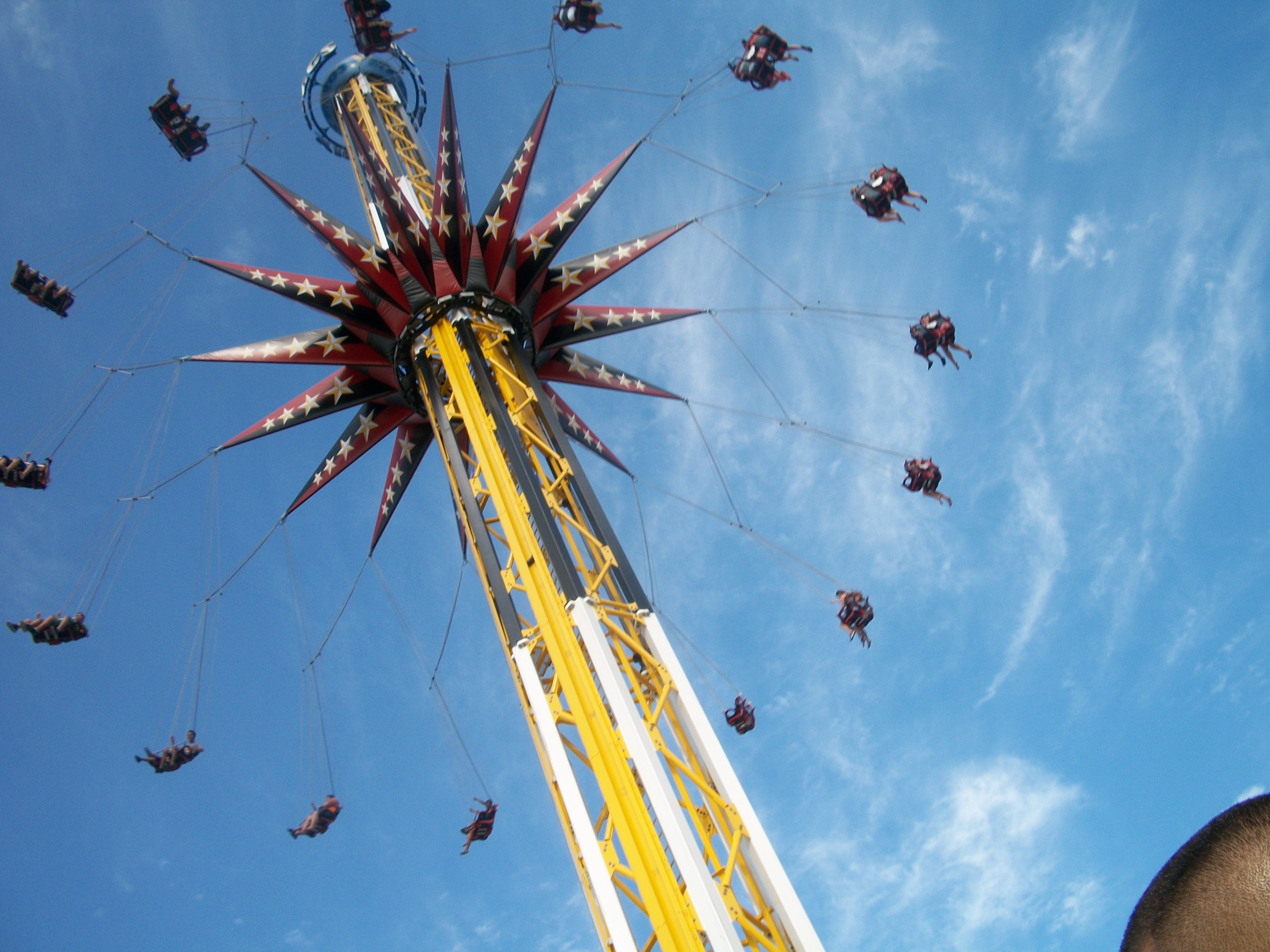
- SkyScreamer at Six Flags Fiesta Texas

Ride statistics
- Attraction type: Tower Swinger
- Manufacturer: Funtime
- Model: Star Flyer
- Speed: 43 mph (69 km/h)
- Vehicles: 16
- Riders per vehicle: 2
- Height restriction: 44–48 in (112–122 cm)
- Fast Lane/Accès Rapide available

SkyScreamer is an amusement ride located at several Six Flags theme parks, two Enchanted Parks and at La Ronde in North America. Designed by Funtime, an Austrian ride manufacturer, the attraction is one of their "Star Flyer" models.

Riders aboard SkyScreamer are carried aloft in two-person swing-like chairs attached to a rotating gondola mounted on a central tower. When the gondola reaches the top of the tower, riders are swung in a wide circle at speeds approaching 43 miles per hour (69 km/h), with a bird's eye view of the surrounding area. The ride is marketed to both thrill-ride enthusiasts and patrons seeking a more family-friendly experience.

== History ==
The first two SkyScreamers were announced in late 2010 for Six Flags Discovery Kingdom and Six Flags St. Louis for the 2011 season. On May 14, 2011, SkyScreamer officially opened at Six Flags St. Louis, where it replaced the Riverview Racer. On May 27, 2011, SkyScreamer made its debut at Six Flags Discovery Kingdom, adjacent to the Medusa roller coaster.

In September 2011, Six Flags announced the addition of SkyScreamer to two more parks, Six Flags Fiesta Texas and Six Flags Great Adventure. On January 19, 2012, Six Flags announced that La Ronde would also receive a Star Flyer tower. On May 19, 2012, La Ronde opened their attraction, using the name Vol Ultime (French for "Ultimate Flight") instead of SkyScreamer. On May 23, 2012, Six Flags Great Adventure opened SkyScreamer as part of their new Adventure Alley section, which was based around the idea of retro-style amusement rides. On May 27, 2012, Six Flags Fiesta Texas opened their SkyScreamer in the Spassburg section of the park; season passholders were allowed to experience the ride one day earlier.

In July 2012, Six Flags New England submitted plans to the city of Agawam, Massachusetts requesting special approval to construct a 385-foot-tall (117 m) Star Flyer ride, as the proposed height exceeded the city's height limit. The approval was granted a week later, with an additional conditional approval to build as tall as 410 feet (125 m), in case a competing park built a taller model first. The planning documents revealed that the ride would replace the park's Skycoaster, "Taz's Dare Devil Dive" as well as the former spot of "Catapult".

However, when Six Flags announced its 2013 capital investments in August 2012, the Six Flags New England Star Flyer was not included. Instead, two other parks, Six Flags Over Texas and Six Flags Over Georgia, were set to receive SkyScreamer attractions. Six Flags Over Georgia's 242-foot (74 m) version replaced the Wheelie and officially debuted on May 24, 2013, after two weekends of passholder previews. Six Flags Over Texas' model, dubbed the Texas SkyScreamer, was awarded the title of the "world's tallest swing carousel ride" by Guinness World Records. Although reports suggested it took this record from the 117-metre-tall (384 ft) Prater Turm in Vienna, Austria, Eclipse at Gröna Lund actually held the record for a period of a month standing at 120 metres (390 ft), 3 metres (9.8 ft) shorter than the Texas SkyScreamer.

On August 29, 2013, Six Flags announced that they would be adding the New England SkyScreamer to Six Flags New England in 2014. The over 400-foot-tall ride debuted officially on May 23, 2014, in the park's North End section. At the time of its debut, New England SkyScreamer held the title for the tallest swing ride.

As part of its 2015 attractions presentation on August 28, 2014, Six Flags announced that Six Flags Mexico will be the next park to receive a SkyScreamer, a 242-foot (74 m) model and the only attraction of its kind in Latin America.

Two years later after the announcement of Six Flags Mexico addition, Six Flags announced that they would be adding yet another Funtime Star Flyer for the 2017 season after a hiatus of building the swing ride back to back. Six Flags America announced on September 1, 2016, that for the following season they would be constructing the tallest ride in the park, Wonder Woman Lasso of Truth a 242-foot (74 m) SkyScreamer. The ride would become one of the first SkyScreamers to be themed to a DC Comics character. Six Flags Mexico rethemed their SkyScreamer to Supergirl in 2018 to be a part of the new theme area the tower was already located in. Also in 2018, Six Flags added a SkyScreamer installation to Six Flags Darien Lake for the 2019 season. The 242-foot-tall ride was labeled the tallest ride in the state of New York.

From 2019 to 2023, there had been no other news with the SkyScreamer attractions at the Six Flags parks. Six Flags announced for the 2024 season, Six Flags Fiesta Texas' SkyScreamer would be rethemed to Supergirl, as the park expands their new DC Universe themed land in parts of Spassburg.

On May 1, 2025, Six Flags announced that the Six Flags America park will close at the end of the 2025 season on November 2, 2025. The status on the future of the Wonder Woman Lasso of Truth attraction was not given at the time of the announcement.

== Ride experience ==
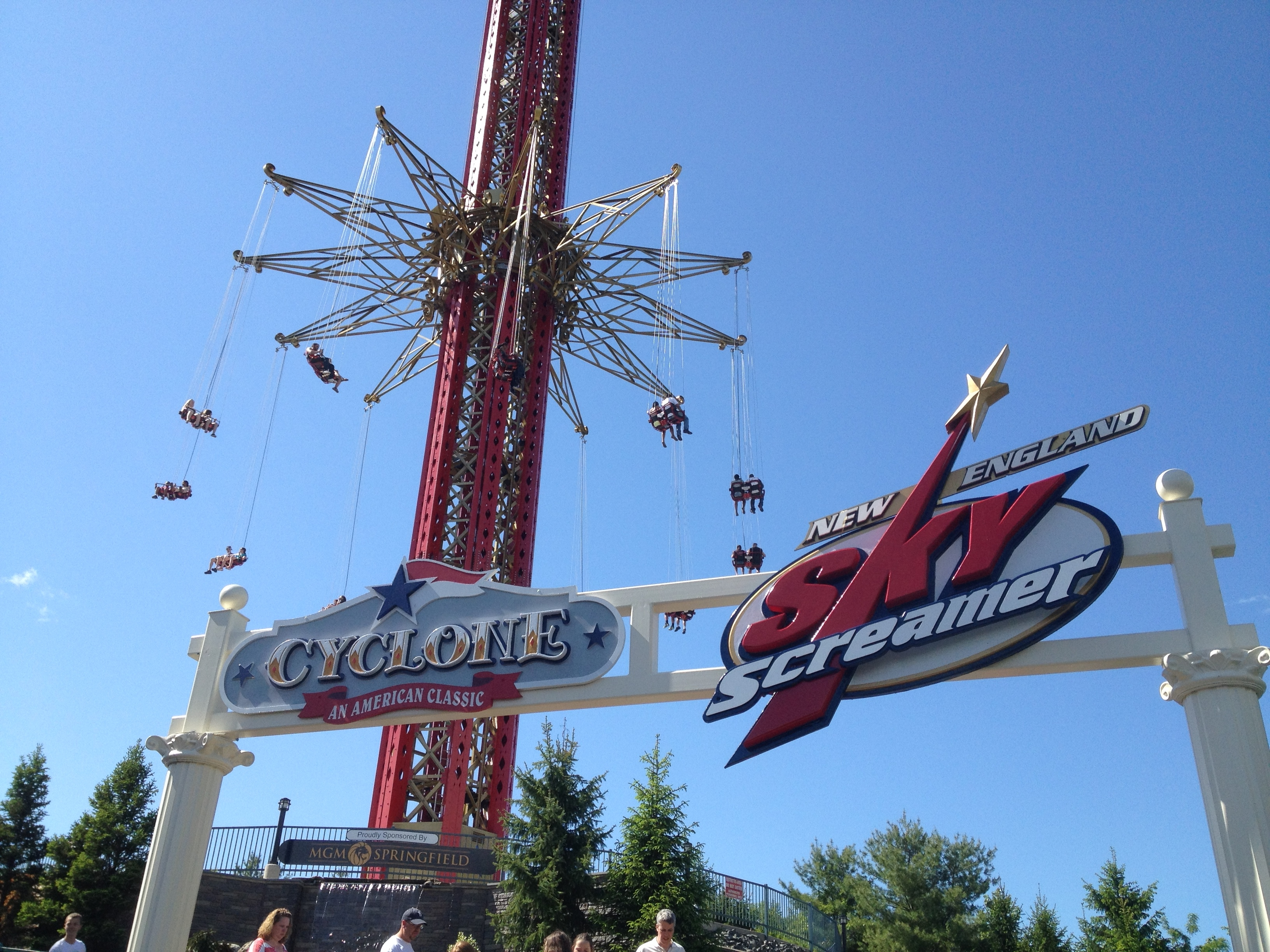
New England SkyScreamer with sign used before RMC conversion of Cyclone into Wicked Cyclone

While the heights of the various SkyScreamer installations vary from park to park, the basic operation of the ride is consistent. Riders sit in one of 16 two-seat chairs connected to a gondola mounted on a central tower, which brings the gondola up and down. A seat belt is placed over the rider's waist to keep them firmly in their seat, and a lap bar is fastened into place. When the ride cycle begins, the gondola rises to the top of the tower, beginning to spin slowly around the central tower and picking up speed as it ascends further. By the time it reaches the top, it rotates around the tower at its full speed of approximately 43 miles per hour (69 km/h), with riders rotating around the tower in a circle 98 feet (30 m) in diameter. The gondola remains at the top of the tower for a period of time, then it descends and slows down slightly before returning to the top. At the end of the cycle, the gondola lowers to the ground and slows its rotation such that, by the time it reaches the bottom of the tower, all rotation ceases and the riders are able to depart. Optionally, SkyScreamer can be set to rotate in the opposite direction during its cycle, such that riders are traveling backwards. Thus far, the installations at Mid-America Adventure, Discovery Kingdom, Fiesta Texas, New England and La Ronde have operated in this manner, with each running them in this mode during special events or as a limited-time promotion.

The New England SkyScreamer and Texas SkyScreamer differ from the standard models, although the actual ride experience is intended to be the same. The gondola of the two rides hold 12 two-seat chairs instead of 16. When the gondola reaches full height, the chairs rotate in a larger circle—124 feet (38 m)—but at a slower speed—35 miles per hour (56 km/h).

== Installations ==
All rides were installed by Ride Entertainment Group, who handle all of Funtime's operations in North America.

Name	Park	Area	Height	Opening date	Closing date	Ref.
SkyScreamer	Mid America Adventure	Illinois	72 metres or 236 feet	May 14, 2011		
SkyScreamer	Six Flags Discovery Kingdom	Sky	46 metres or 151 feet	May 27, 2011		
Vol Ultime	La Ronde		45 metres or 148 feet	May 19, 2012		
SkyScreamer	Six Flags Great Adventure	Adventure Alley	74 metres or 243 feet	May 22, 2012		
Supergirl Sky Flight	Six Flags Fiesta Texas	DC Universe	61 metres or 200 feet	May 27, 2012		
SkyScreamer	Six Flags Over Georgia	Lickskillet	74 metres or 243 feet	May 24, 2013		
Texas SkyScreamer	Six Flags Over Texas	USA	122 metres or 400 feet	May 25, 2013		
New England SkyScreamer	Six Flags New England	North End	122 metres or 400 feet	May 23, 2014		
Supergirl Sky Flight	Six Flags Mexico	Hollywood	74 metres or 243 feet	March 7, 2015		
North Star	Valleyfair		70 metres or 230 feet	May 12, 2017		
Wonder Woman Lasso of Truth	Six Flags America	Gotham City	74 metres or 243 feet	June 13, 2017	November 2, 2025	
SkyScreamer	Six Flags Darien Lake		74 metres or 243 feet	May 18, 2019		

== Reception ==
SkyScreamer has been described as being a "classic" and "retro" ride by the press. It is marketed as a compromise between riders who prefer roller coasters and similar thrills and those who prefer more family-friendly rides. Roller coaster enthusiasts, who are often sought out to sample new thrill rides, have been generally positive about the attractions. Frankie Gobel, a roller coaster fan whose father, Charlie Gobel, wrote a book about their experiences entitled Flying With Frankie: Three Hundred Days in Amusement Parks Riding Roller Coasters With My Son, described the ride as not being "your typical swing set" commenting that "It's not too intense for Mom or too dull for a teenager. It's the perfect family ride - assuming your family has a strong stomach."

Gary Slade, the publisher of Amusement Today magazine, said that while SkyScreamer doesn't have the same drawing power as a new roller coaster, it still was the type of ride parks needed to install to keep guests returning. Slade said, in regards to the attraction at Six Flags Fiesta Texas, "I think it's really going to be a huge hit for them."

== See also ==
- WindSeeker, a similar ride by Mondial at other Six Flags theme parks
- 2011 in amusement parks
- 2012 in amusement parks
- 2013 in amusement parks

Preceded by Eclipse at Gröna Lund (399 ft/121.6 meters)	World's Tallest Swing Ride (Texas SkyScreamer); May 2013–May 2014	Succeeded by New England SkyScreamer at Six Flags New England (409 ft/124.6 meters)

Preceded by Texas SkyScreamer at Six Flags Over Texas (400 ft/121.9 meters)	World's Tallest Swing Ride (New England SkyScreamer); May 2014–June 2018	Succeeded by World's Tallest Starflyer on I-Drive in Orlando
