= Funtime =

Funtime or Fun Time may refer to:

- "Funtime" (Iggy Pop song), 1977, covered by Boy George
- "Funtime" (The Spitfire Boys song), 1979
- Funtime Comics, a Christchurch, New Zealand based collective of comic artists and writers
- Fun Time (TV series), a Canadian children's television series
- Fun Time (album), a 1975 album by Count Basie
- "Fun Time", a song written by Allen Toussaint and performed by Joe Cocker on the 1978 album Luxury You Can Afford
- Funtime, Inc., a former amusement park operator based in Cleveland, Ohio
- Funtime (manufacturer), an Austrian amusement ride manufacturer
- Funtime (amusement park), an amusement park in Surfers Paradise, Queensland, Australia
- The Funtimes, a animatronics class in Five Nights at Freddy's
