= Starflyer =

Starflyer or Star Flyer may refer to:

- StarFlyer, a Japanese airline
- Star Flyer, a sailing ship operated by Star Clippers of Sweden
- Starflyer 59, an indie rock/shoegaze band from Riverside, California
- The Starflyer, an alien antagonist in Peter F. Hamilton's Commonwealth Saga
- Starflyers, a computer edutainment series of games released by The Learning Company

== Amusement rides ==
- Star Flyer (ride), produced by Australian manufacturer Funtime
- Star Flyer (roller coaster), a Pinfari manufactured ride in Star City in Pasay, Metro Manila, Philippines.
- Star Flyer (Tivoli Gardens), a Funtime-manufactured ride in Copenhagen, Denmark
- Texas Star Flyer, a Funtime-manufactured ride at Galveston Island Historic Pleasure Pier, US
