= Skyline Park =

Amusement Park in Bavaria, Germany

- Interactive map of Skyline Park
- Location: Bad Wörishofen, Bavaria, Germany
- Coordinates: 48.043055°N 10.591245°E
- Status: Operating
- Opened: 1999
- Owner: Joachim Löwenthal
- Attendance: 419,000 in 2017
- Area: 35 ha (86 acres)

Attractions
- Total: 43
- Roller coasters: 6
- Water rides: 5
- Website: www.skylinepark.de

Skyline Park (also known as Allgäu Skyline Park) is a 35-hectare (86-acre) amusement park in Bad Wörishofen, Bavaria, Germany. The facility includes several thrill rides, family attractions, and playground amenities. The park is run by the Löwenthal family of showmen.

== History ==
=== Kirchdorf Leisure Park and Skyline Park's beginnings (1975–1998) ===
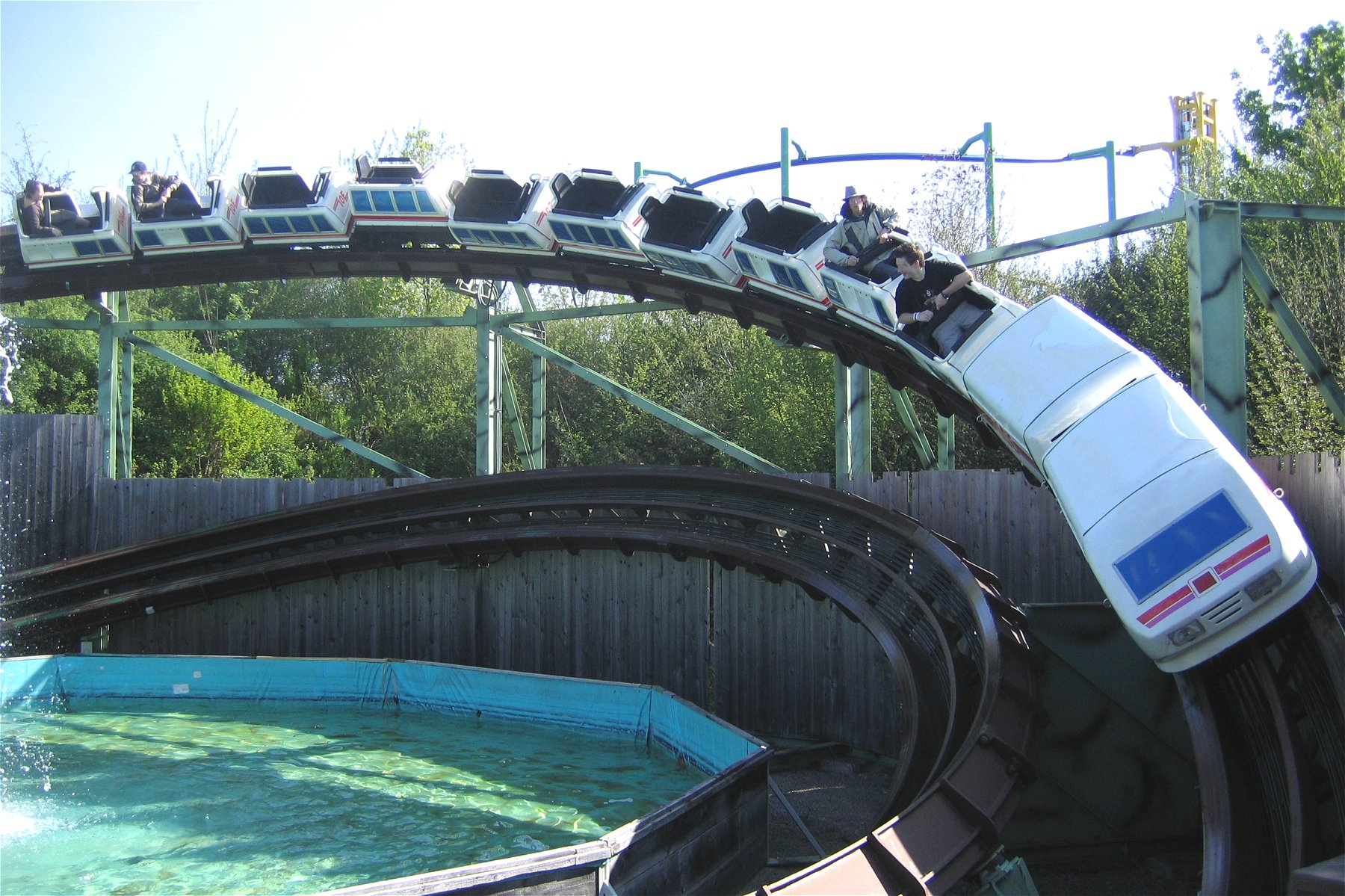
Skyline Express (formerly ICE-Express) opened at the park upon Löwenthal's acquisition in 1999. It was removed following the 2016 season.

The beginnings of Skyline Park can be traced back to the Kirchdorf Leisure Park in Stadtbergen, a town within the district of Augsburg. The park - essentially a giant playground - was located there from 1975 to 1991, but a disagreement with the land's owner over expansion plans led to the park's move to its present location in Bad Wörishofen. The Leisure Park's attractions consisted mainly of several slides, pedal-powered rides, and an electric-powered car ride. The park began to install larger rides in the late 90s, most notably with the addition of the Anton Schwarzkopf roller coaster Silberpfeil. In 1999, the park was bought by the Löwenthal family of showmen and was formally reopened as Skyline Park. Park owner Joachim Löwenthal quickly brought a multitude of larger rides into the park upon its acquisition, including the Sky Rider suspended roller coaster and Bob Racing powered bobkart attraction.

=== Continued growth and development (2004–2014) ===
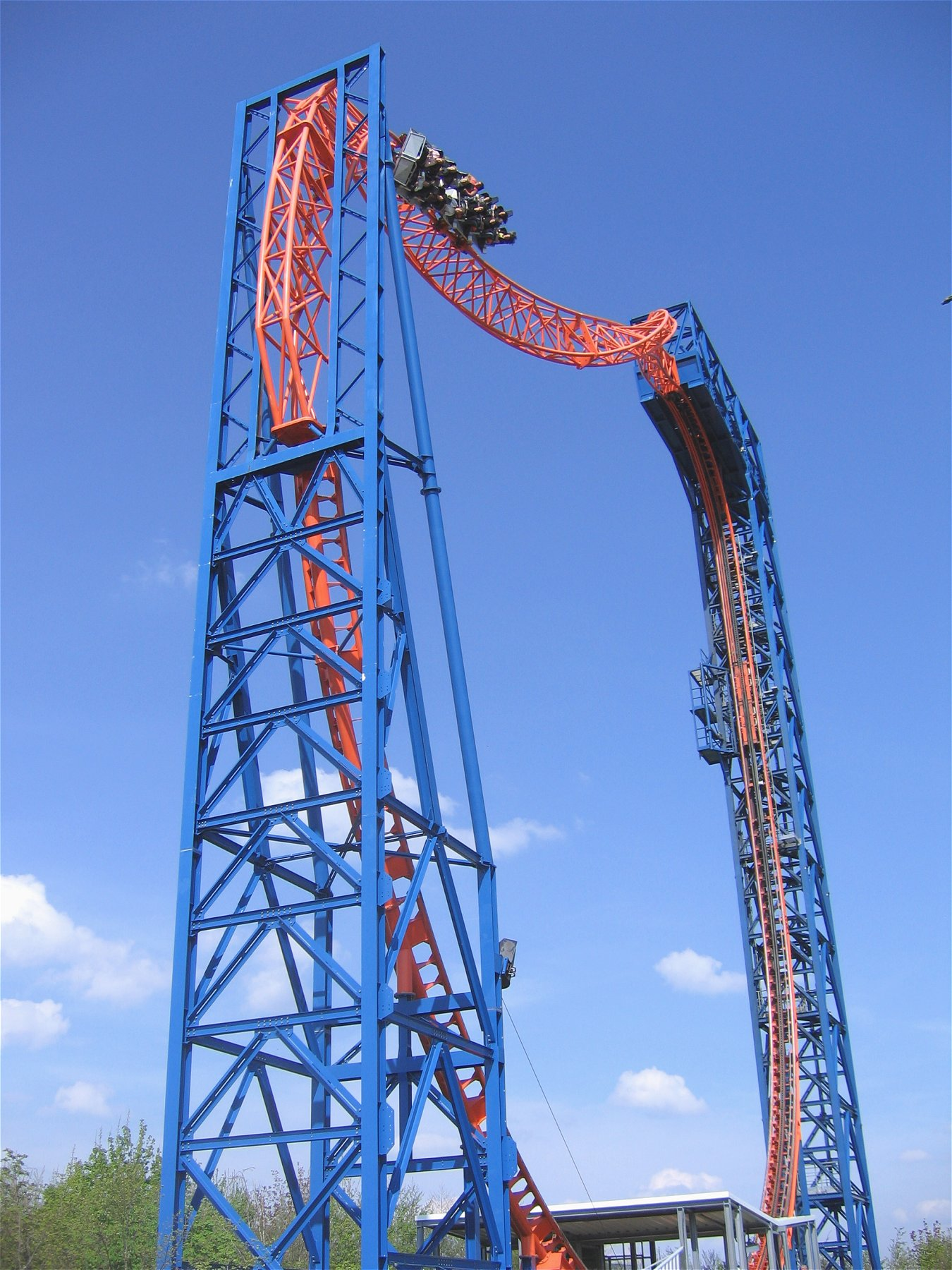
Sky Wheel at Skyline Park

In the spring of 2004, the Löwenthal family approached Maurer Söhne (now knows as Maurer AG), a German firm whom were at the time making headlines around the industry with their innovative X-Car coaster design. The park opened the Sky Wheel roller coaster in late 2004, and formally in 2005. The coaster was shaped like a vertical arc and described to the public as a "ferris wheel without spokes". The success of the Sky Wheel resulted in several similar attractions and X-Car designs built around the world over the next several years, with varying degrees of success.

In 2009, the former Condor was purchased from Heide Park and rechristened as the Sky Twister. The Autoscooter bumper cars, which were installed during the previous year, was expanded in order to become the largest bumper car attraction in Germany. For the 2010 season, Skyline Park added the Sky Rafting rapids ride, which had formerly traveled on the fair circuit with the Löwenthal family. Its addition was a part of a 2-hectare expansion to the northeast corner of the park.

The 2012–2013 seasons saw Skyline Park purchase two retired attractions from the United Kingdom. For the 2012 season, the Sky Jet thrill ride was added near the Sky Rafting. The ride was a Zierer Star Shape that had formerly operated as Bling at Blackpool Pleasure Beach from 2004 to 2011. Sky Jet was removed following the 2019 season and sold to Fantasy Island in the UK. For the 2013 season, the park purchased the Whirlwind, a Maurer AG spinning coaster, from the former Camelot Theme Park, which had ceased operations in late 2012. The coaster was refurbished and rechristened as Sky Spin.

=== Expansion and further investments (2015–present) ===
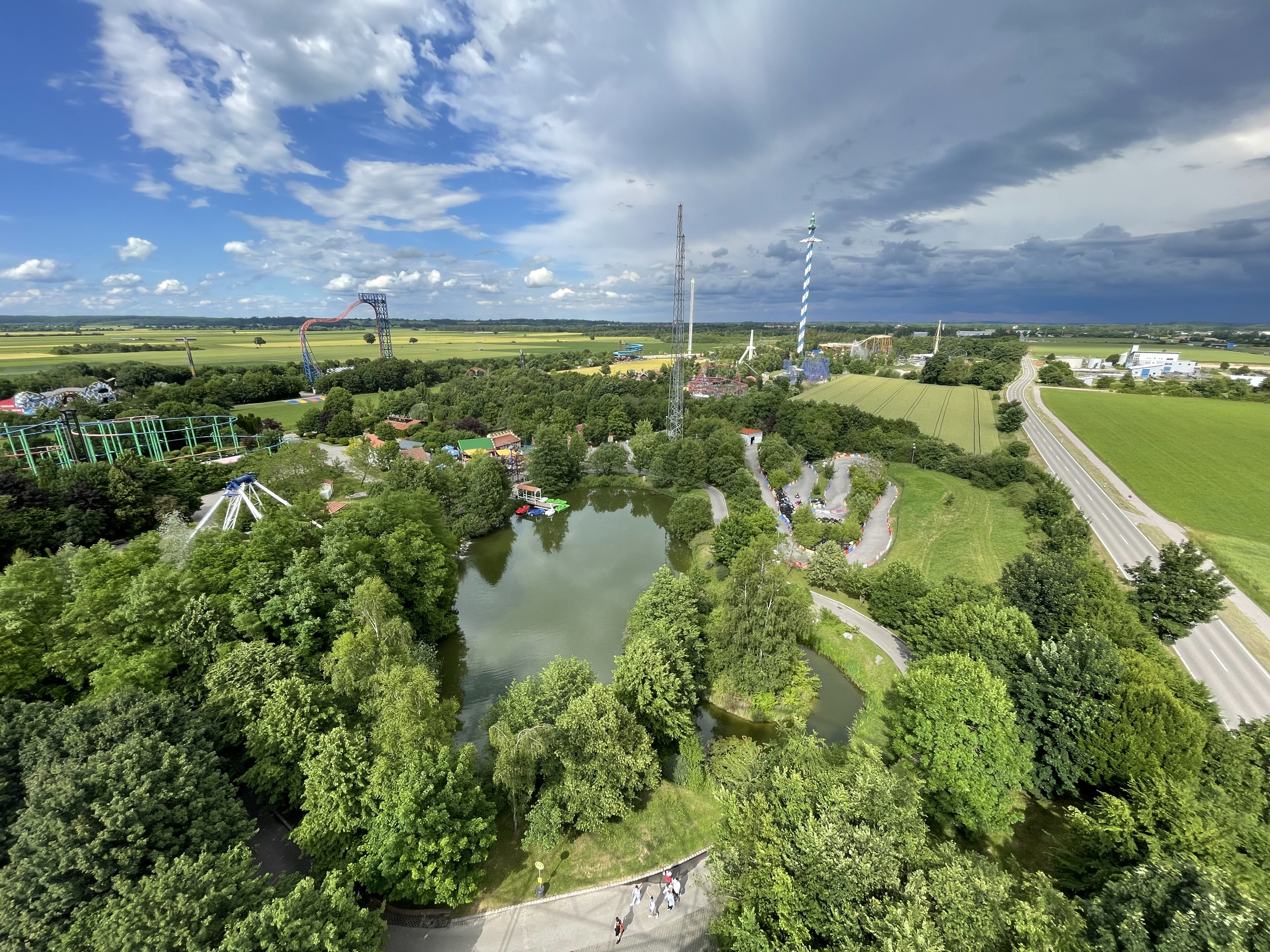
View from the Riesenrad in 2021

Various new attractions were installed at the park during an expansion to the western side of the property between 2015 and 2019. During this time, the Italy-based SBF Visa Group provided multiple rides, most notably the High Fly pendulum ride, Kids Spin junior spinning coaster, and Zero Gravity rotor. Joachim Löwenthal retired two well-known attractions from the fair circuit and permanently installed them at the park, in 2017 and 2019, respectively; Wildwasserbahn III (1992), the world's largest transportable log flume, and Geisterschlange (1979), a ghost train style dark ride. The headlining installation, however, was Sky Dragster, a prototype Spike Coaster from Maurer AG. On this attraction, riders straddle a monorail-ensue track and are able to control the speed of their car. Although the coaster concept won various innovation awards, it ultimately suffered from severe mechanical failures throughout its lifetime, to the point that for a period of time in 2020 park management brought the coaster's long-term viability into question.

For the 2020 season, two major new rides were added to the park. The first, Sky Fall, was a portable drop tower that stood 85 metres (279 ft) tall and is one of the tallest active fairground drop towers. As the ongoing COVID-19 pandemic had cancelled festivals across Europe, Löwenthal invited Sky Fall's operators – the Goetzke family – to set up the attraction at the park in order to make a profit. Although it was intended to only be rented out for 5 months, the Sky Fall stayed at the park through to the 2021 season. The second attraction was the Allgäuflieger, a Funtime Starflyer attraction. The Allgäuflieger currently stands as the world's tallest of its kind at 150 metres (490 ft), and is thus one of the tallest tower rides ever built.

In October 2021, Löwenthal declared to the press the park's intentions to invest €8-10 million into a major new coaster for the 2024 season, which would become one of Germany's tallest roller coasters at 70 metres (230 ft) of height (3 meters shorter than Germany's current tallest coasters, Europa-Park's Silver Star and Hansa-Park's Kärnan) as well as a track length of 1.2 kilometres (3,900 ft). It was reported that Bavarian manufacturer Gerstlauer would manufacturer the project. Although the project ultimately didn't come to fruition, the park installed three attractions from SBF Visa between 2023 and 2024; the children's coaster Flotter Otto, the Looping Alois thrill ride, and launched Berg- und Tal Hetz.

== Rides ==
=== Roller coasters ===
Name	Year opened	Manufacturer	Description	Ref
Berg- und Tal Hetz	2024	SBF Visa Group	A compact launch coaster that utilizes drive tires positioned on an incline to reach a top speed of 50 km/h (31 mph). Originally intended to open in 2022, the project was delayed multiple times. The coaster was initially set up for commissioning at SBF Visa's factory before being delivered to the park, opening in August 2024.	
Flotter Otto	2023	SBF Visa Group	A double-helix children's coaster that reuses the former Bob Racing station.	
Kids Spin	2017	SBF Visa Group	A small spinning roller coaster that navigates a figure-8 layout. The attraction model is known formally as the Compact Spinning Coaster 3 Loop (MX609)	
Sky Dragster	2017	Maurer AG	A prototype model of the Maurer Spike powered coaster. Riders straddle the track on a motorbike car and are able to control their speed along the track. The attraction was originally slated to open in 2016, but various technical problems at the time pushed its opening back. Even after opening in 2017, however, Sky Dragster was plagued with technical difficulties. In February 2020, following up on increasing issues and mounting frustration, officials from Skyline Park pulled Sky Dragster from operation and deemed it closed until further notice. However, after a thorough reprogramming, the attraction reopened in 2021 with the ability to complete multiple rounds around the track.	
Sky Rider	2001	Caripro	A spinning suspended roller coaster. Riders are hoisted up to a height of 65.6 feet (20.0 m) via an elevator lift, where they then make a smooth descent along the track.	
Sky Wheel	2004	Maurer AG	A SkyLoop roller coaster, in which riders descend a vertical lift hill and descend through a loop. The coaster is a part of Maurer's X-Car coaster line, and at the time of its opening was a world's first.	

=== Water rides ===
Name	Year opened	Manufacturer	Description
Nautic Jets	1994	Sunkid Heege GmbH	A pair of self-operated ramps in which a boat containing a rider is pulled to the top. It is then released down the slope and speeds over the ramp, "jumping" into the pond. A cable then drags the boat back to the loading position.
Sky Rafting	2010	ABC Rides	A river rapids ride that prior to its installation at Skyline Park had traveled the fair circuit with the Löwenthal family under the name Wild N' Wet. The attraction uses an elevator lift to lift circular rafts to a height of 34 metres (112 ft), and allowing riders to descend to the bottom.
Tretbootfahrt	1999		A collection of pedalos that can be used on a nearby pond. Riders can pick either a car, duck, or swan boat.
Water Splash	2015	Stanic	A splash battle attraction where riders are able to aim water jets at one another.
Wildwasserbahn 2	2017	Mack Rides	The world's largest transportable log flume. Known as the Wildwasserbahn III, the attraction was manufactured in 1992 and was owned by the Löwenthal family. During its time on the fair circuit, it typically made stops at Cranger Kirmes, Oktoberfest, and the Größte Kirmes am Rhein. For the 2017 season, it was installed permanently at the park. Wildwasserbahn stands at a height of 30 metres (98 ft), reaches speeds of 50 km/h (31 mph), and travels backwards for a portion of the ride.

=== Rides ===
Name	Year opened	Manufacturer	Description
Allgäuflieger	2020	Funtime	A 150-metre (490 ft) tall Starflyer tower ride.
Alte Liebe	1999	HUSS Park Attractions	A pirate ship attraction.
Autoscooter	2008		A bumper cars attraction, which operates with 20 two-passenger cars. For the 2009 season, the Autoscooter was expanded from an initial 1000 m^{2} space to 1056 m^{2}, in order to receive the title of Germany's largest bumper car attraction.
Baustellenfahrt	2000	SBF Visa Group	A slow-paced children's car ride through a highly themed construction site, where younger riders steer miniature bulldozers along a 200-metre (660 ft) long track.
Breakdancer	2019	SBF Visa Group	A "Mini-Breakdance" children's ride.
Funny Cars		SBF Visa Group	A car-themed teacups attraction.
Flug der Karibik			A spinning children's ride themed to pirate ships.
Formel 1	1999	SBF Visa Group	A 350 metres (1,150 ft) long covered go-kart track where riders drive scaled-down bumper car vehicles. The attraction is mainly intended for younger audiences.
Geisterbahn	2019	Mack Rides	A traveling Ghost Train dark ride, which was first constructed in 1979. Throughout its lifetime, the attraction typically made stops at the Cannstatter Volksfest and Europa-Park's Horror Nights. The ride was formally owned by the showman Lehmann and was permanently retired from the fairground circuit in 2019, instead opting to celebrate its 40th year at Skyline Park and staying there for the indefinite future, where it replaced the Wildwasserbahn 2.
High Fly	2017	SBF Visa Group	A giant 24-passenger frisbee ride that opened for the 2017 season. The pendulum attraction swings 360° around its vertical axis and flings riders as high as 33 metres (108 ft).
Kids Cars	2017	SBF Visa Group	A spinning children's ride themed to cars.
Kindereisenbahn	1999		A children's slow-speed train ride.
Kinderkarussell	2015	SBF Visa Group	A scaled-down children's carousel with multiple vehicles, which replaced a similar attraction that had been dismantled after the 2014 season.
Krinoline	2007	Fabbri Group	A twirling carousel attraction, similar in motion to the Wipeout fairground ride. A more famous example of this attraction is the Krinoline at the Munich Oktoberfest, which debuted in 1924 and is considered to be a staple of the event.
Looping Alois	2023	SBF Visa Group	A Red Baron attraction where riders will use a joystick to control the flipping movements/rotation of their plane.
Lufti-Kuss	2022	Klaus	A classic traveling Allround ride (similar to the Paratrooper) that was initially installed at the park as a temporary attraction, but has since been retained as a permanent offering.
Parkbähnchen	2017		A trolley tram offering transportation around the park.
Pony Trip	2015	SBF Visa Group	A children's attraction where riders board electrically powered horse vehicles and travel at 5.5 km/h (3.4 mph) along an 83-metre (272 ft) long rail.
Riesenrad	2002	Carousel Holland B.V.	A 40-metre (130 ft) tall ferris wheel.
Riesenrutsche	1999		A pair of 12-metre (39 ft) tall dry slides. The foremost is a 4-lane, 15 metres (49 ft) long wave slide, while the second is a steeper, faster stainless steel chute.
Sky Circle	2003	Zamperla	A Booster ride that stands nearly 60 metres (200 ft) tall and propels riders through the air at 120 km/h (75 mph), inducing forces of up to 3.5 Gs. The attraction was first opened on a plot of land closer to the Sky Wheel roller coaster but has since been relocated three times in order to make room for different attractions.
Sky Fall	2003	Soriani & Moser	The park's permanent drop tower attraction, which stands 24 metres (79 ft) tall and is themed to an oil refinery. In addition, both of the tower's 8-passenger vehicles are capable of tilting forwards 35°.
Sky Karts	2002		A 220-metre (720 ft) Go-kart track.
Sky Shot	2001	Funtime	A sling shot attraction that shoots a pair of riders up to 90 metres (300 ft) high.
Sky Twister	2009	HUSS Rides	A Condor attraction that previously operated as the Condor at Heide Park from 1989 to 2008. It originally took riders up to a height of 32 metres (105 ft) until the tower was removed for the 2025 season, resulting in a modified operations cycle where the attraction only runs at ground level.
Wellenflieger	2000	Zierer	A wave swinger attraction. The ride had previously been located at Kure Portopialand from 1996 to 1998.
Zero Gravity	2017	SBF Visa Group	A rotor attraction that was constructed in the building formerly occupied by the Cinematrix 4D theatre.

=== Other attractions ===
- Humoristisches Velodrom - An arena filled with disproportionally designed bicycles.
- Kids Farm - A large children's playground, built in 2015.
- Sky Jump - A bungee trampoline attraction for children.
- Sky Walk - A zipline obstacle course suspended above the ground, installed in 2015.
- Spassbad - A swimming pool area with a small pair of waterslides, built in 2004.
- Trampolin - Trampolines.
- Wasserspielplatz - A water hole and area where children can cool off.

== Former attractions ==
Name	Year opened	Year closed	Description
Après-Ski Party	2022	2022	A Funhouse owned by German showman Andree Fackler. The attraction was built in 2010 within the structure of a former 1974 Mack Rides Music Express. It spent the 2022 season at Skyline Park, where it was located near the Sky Circle.: Après-Ski Party's Official website
Break Dance	2012	2013	A HUSS Breakdance ride owned by the traveling showman Alexander Götzke from Munich. Following its time at Skyline Park, it operated at Eifelpark - another park operated by the Löwenthal family - on numerous occasions.
Bob Racing	2001	2020	An electrically powered Wiegand bob-kart ride that measured 680 metres (2,230 ft) long and allowed riders to reach speeds of up to 40 km/h (25 mph). It's since been replaced by Flotter Otto.
Bolt: Ultimate Sea Coaster	2021	2022	A Maurer Spike Coaster that was set up on the park's land from mid-2021 to early 2022 for commissioning; the attraction was to be later installed on the Carnival Celebration cruise ship. Due to this, it never opened to guests.
Butterfly	1996; 1996	≤ 2012; 2019	A pair of Sunkid Heege self-operated butterfly coasters. A two person-cart would be lifted up to the top of one side of a half-pipe before being released, and would swing side to side before coming to a stop at the bottom. One of the attractions was taken out around 2012 and the second followed suit in 2019.
Cinematrix 4D	2000	2016	A 4D motion simulator attraction, provided to the park by McFadden Simulators. Its building is now occupied by the Zero Gravity attraction.
Nostalgische Achterbahn	1999	2022	A Schwarzkopf Wildcat that originally toured the German fair circuits under the name Alpen-Express from 1968 to 1998 before finding a permanent home near the park's entrance, where the "Sky Walk" attraction is now found. After the 2014 season, the coaster was dismantled and set up on a new expansion to the west side of the park in 2015. The move saw the attraction receive an extensive refurbishment and paint job. Following another complete overhaul in 2021, it was sold to German showman Norbert Witte.
Rote Baron	1975	2017	A people powered attraction compromising four airplane vehicles that were spun in a circle. Despite its diminutive size, the attraction was quite thrilling and thus suitable for adults. To operate this, at least one person would have to pedal on a stationary bicycle of sorts. The Rote Baron was dismantled following the 2017 season.
Silberpfeil	1997	2000	A Schwarzkopf Katapult coaster. The ride only operated for a short time due to technical problems and was put up for sale after a refurbishment in 2001.
SkyFall	2020	2021	A Funtime drop tower that stands at a height of 80 metres (260 ft). The ride is owned by the showman Michael Goetzke and debuted on the fairgrounds in 2013 as the world's tallest transportable drop tower. Skyfall has been present at the annual Oktoberfest every year since it began touring, except when the event was cancelled in 2020 due to the COVID-19 pandemic. In order to operate and profit with the attraction, it was set up at Skyline Park for the 2020 and 2021 seasons.: SkyFall's Official website
Sky Jet	2012	2019	A Zierer Star Shape that had been purchased from Blackpool Pleasure Beach, where it had operated as Bling from 2004 to 2011. The ride was then sold to Britain's Mellors Group.
Skyline Express	1999	2016	A Metroline attraction that was the last of its kind at the time of its closure. Similar to the Schwarzkopf Bayern Kurve, riders traveled at high speeds in an electrically powered train around a circular banked track, although the track made two loops around the centre instead of one. The ride opened as the ICE-Express, was manufactured by BHS, ran a 20-passenger train, and reached speeds of 40 km/h (25 mph) along a 100-metre (330 ft) long track. It was retired due to a lack of spare parts for the discontinued model, which had begun to put a strain on its maintenance.
Sky Spin	2013	2025	A Maurer AG spinning coaster that originally opened in 2003 as Whirlwind at the now-defunct Camelot Theme Park in Lancashire, England. When the park closed at the end of 2012, the coaster was sold and relocated to Skyline Park. The coaster was sold to German showman FTE Ahrend and will tour the national fair circuit.
Wildwasserbahn	2006	2017	A log flume with two drops and a peak height of 14 metres (46 ft). For the 2018 season, the attraction was relocated to Eifelpark, where it currently operates as the Pirateninsel.

== Gallery ==
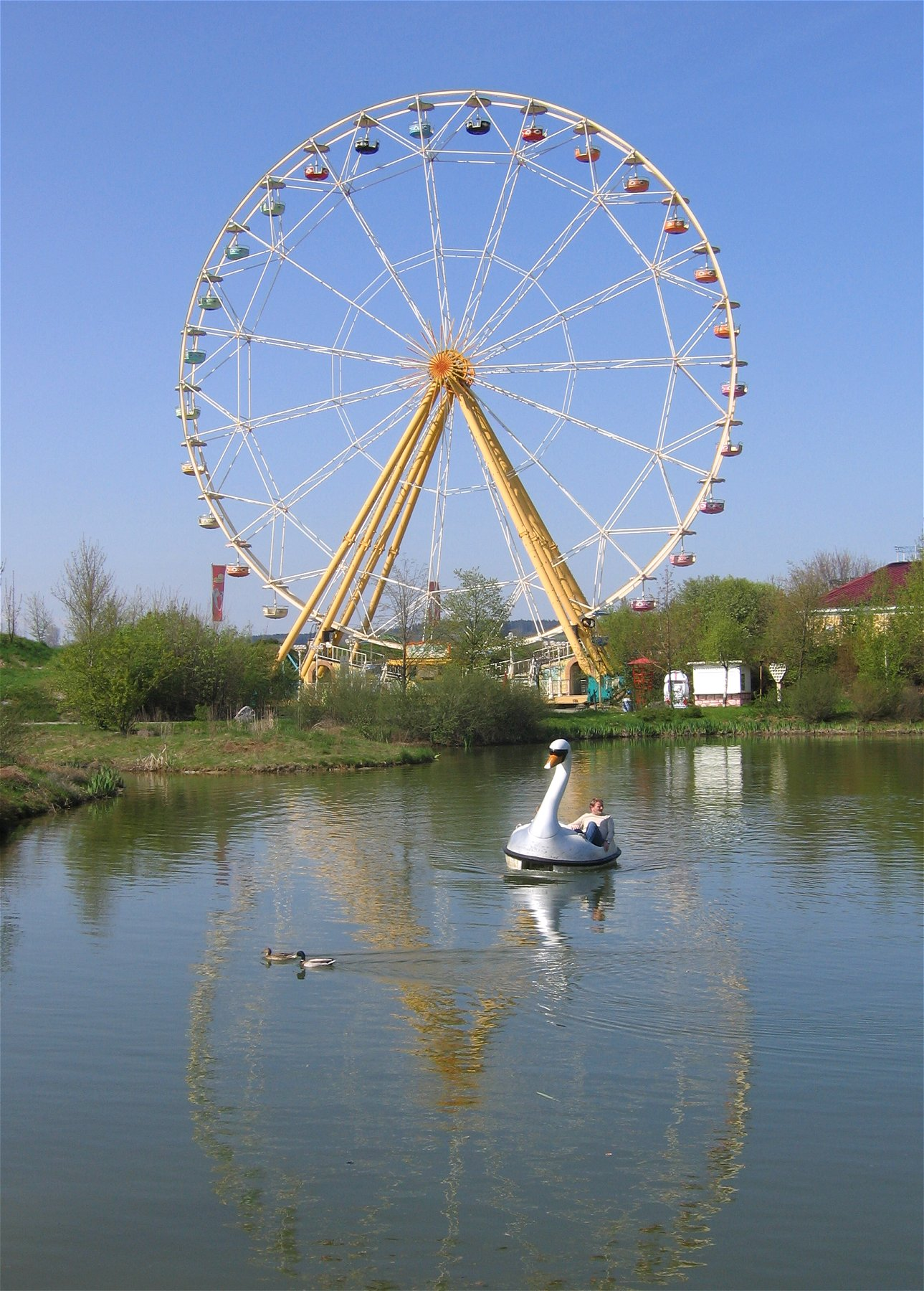
Riesenrad

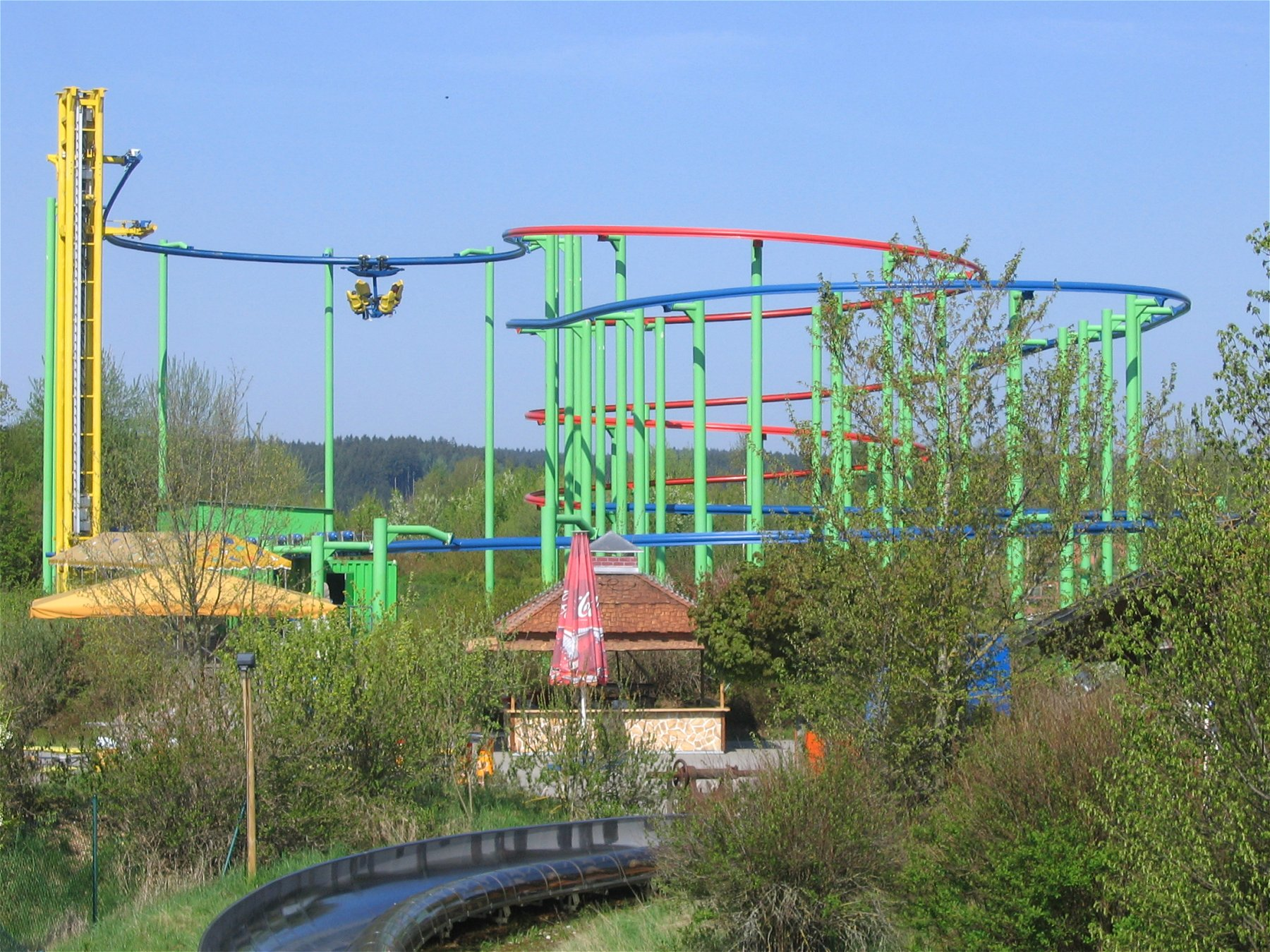
Sky Rider

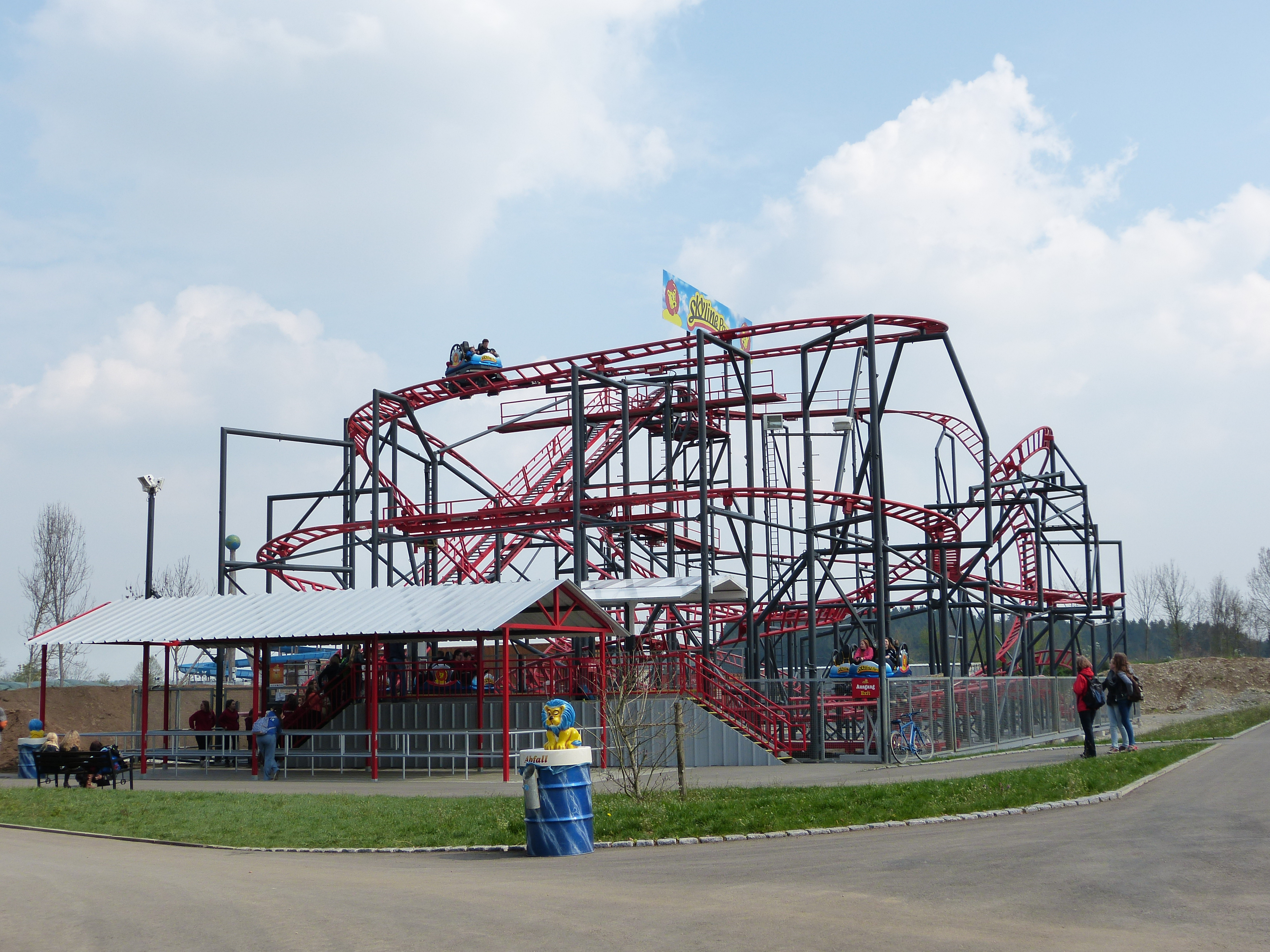
Sky Spin

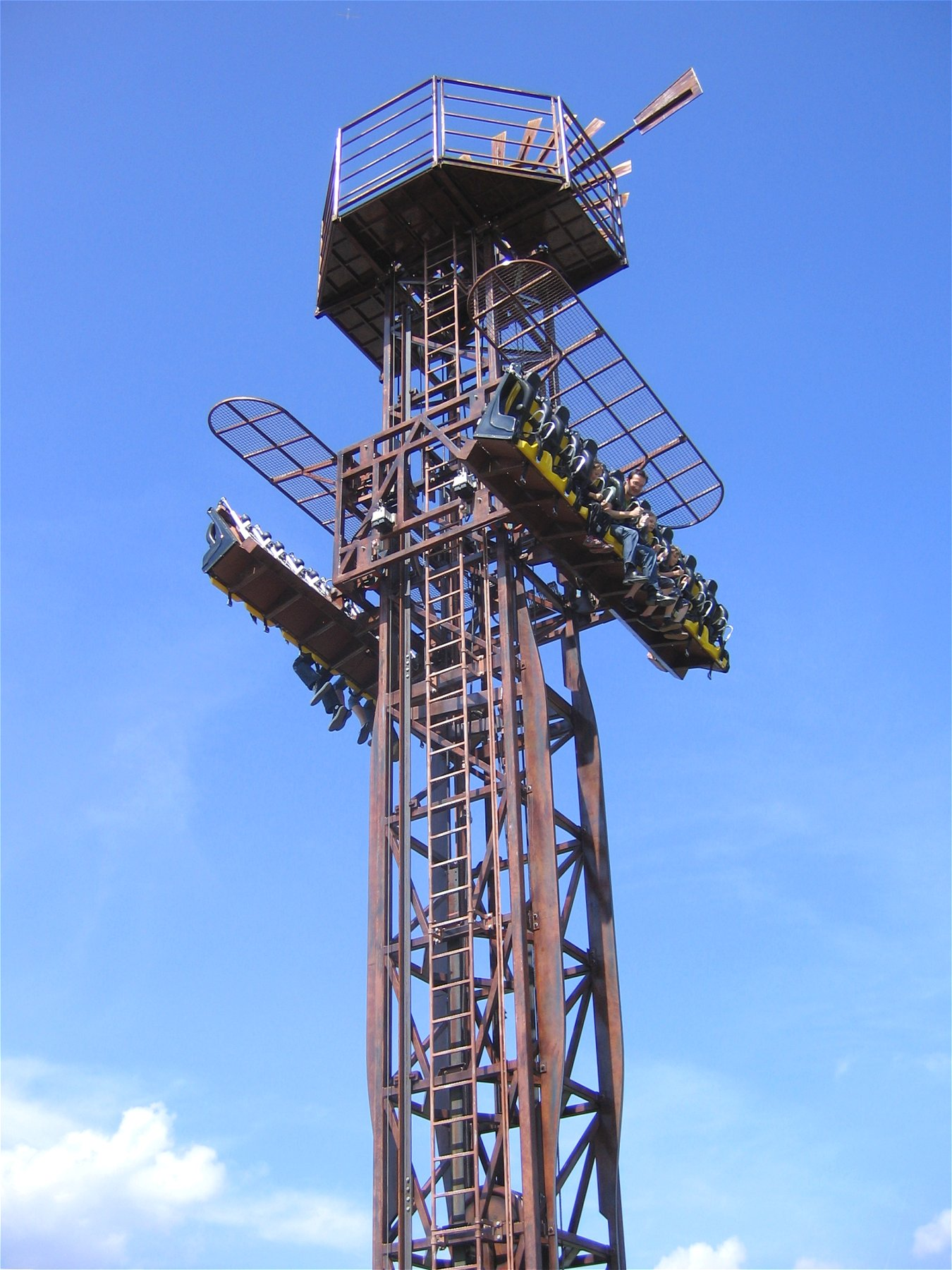
Sky Fall

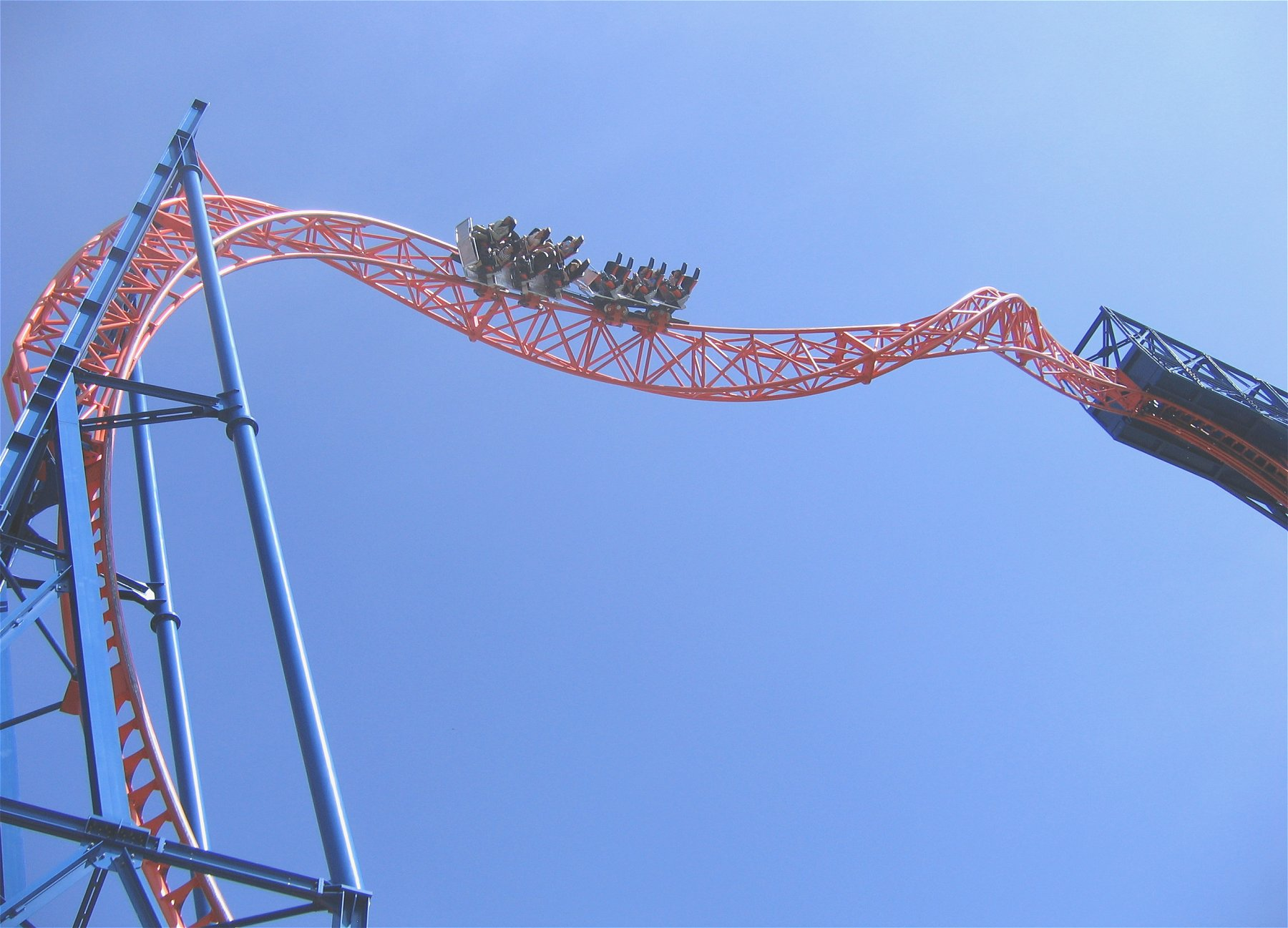
Sky Wheel

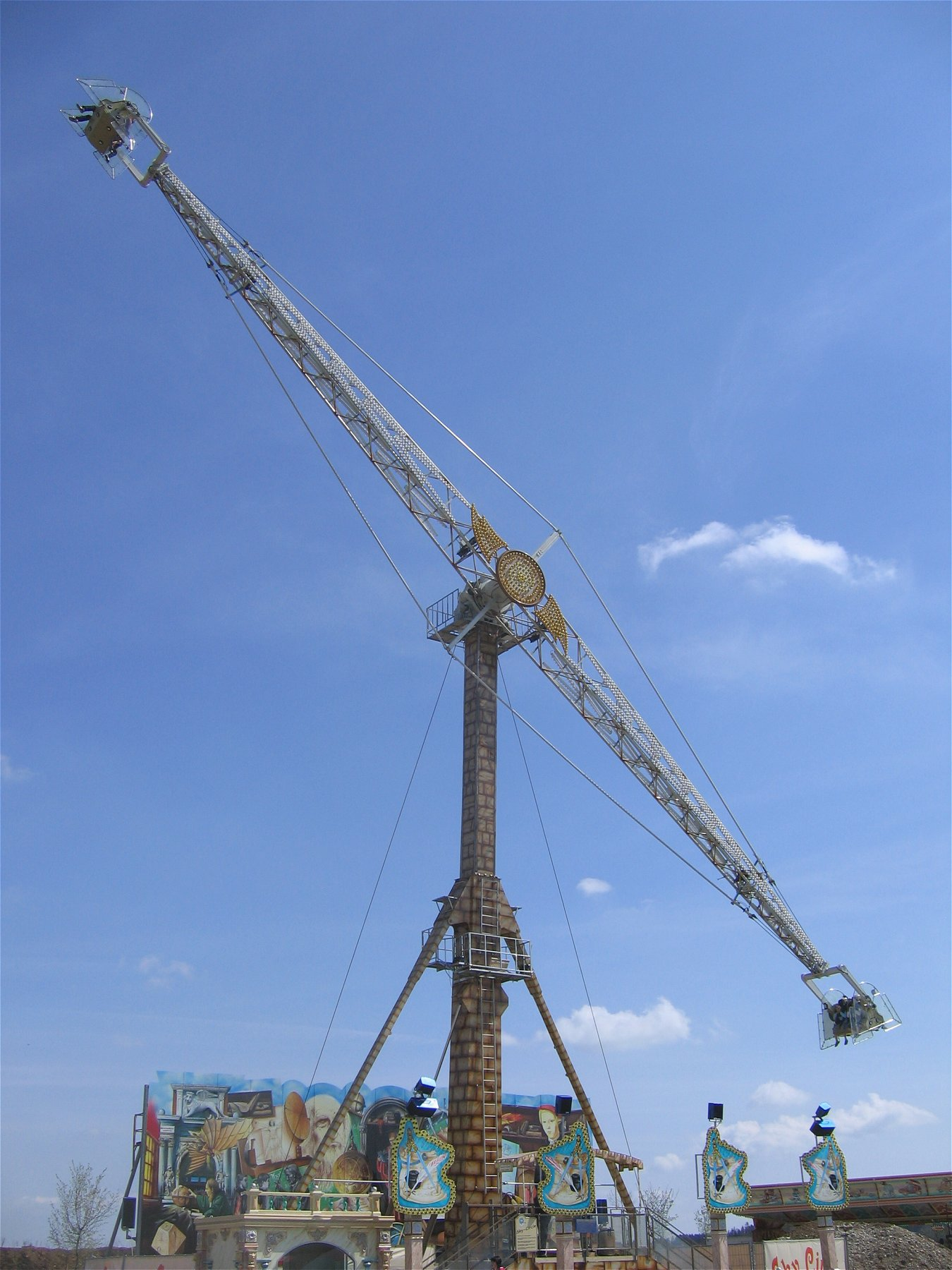
Sky Circle
