= Himmelskibet =

Himmelskibet may refer to:

- Himmelskibet (film) a 1918 Danish film
- Himmelskibet (thrill ride), an amusement ride in Tivoli Gardens, Copenhagen
