= Luna Park, Tel Aviv =

Amusement park complex in Tel Aviv, Israel

Luna Park in Tel Aviv
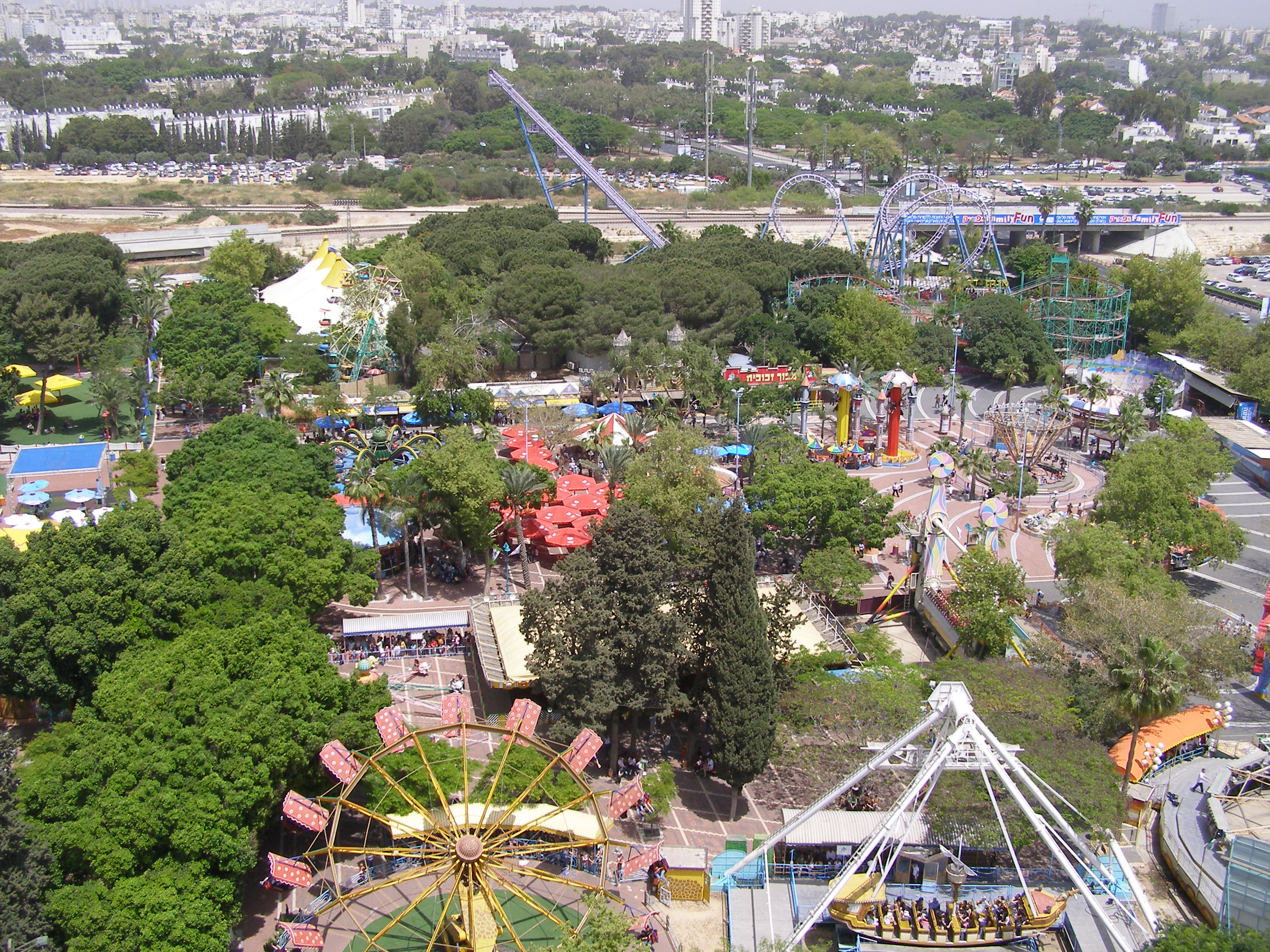
- Interactive map of Luna Park in Tel Aviv
- Location: Tel Aviv, Israel
- Coordinates: 32.106279°N 34.812026°E
- Opened: 1970
- Owner: Entertainment Town Ltd.

Attractions
- Total: 27
- Roller coasters: 3
- Water rides: 1

Luna Park (Hebrew: לונה פארק תל אביב) is an amusement park complex in the Expo Tel Aviv in Tel Aviv, Israel.

== History ==
Luna Park was established in 1970. Luna Park attractions include Ferris wheels, bumper cars, carousels and roller coasters. In its early days, entrance was free and visitors paid only for rides.

There is also an Israeli children's song called "Daddy, Let's Go to Luna Park" written in the 1950s, named for a previous iteration of Luna Park a few kilometers to the south in Jaffa.

== Attractions ==
=== Roller coasters ===
Ride Name	Picture	Opened	Manufacturer	Model/Type	Notes
Anaconda		2000	Vekoma	Boomerang	In 2015 it was repainted to orange and green.
Roller Coaster		March 14, 2010	Vekoma	Junior Coaster - 335m	Replaced the old Roller Coaster after 32 years.
Twister		2011	Eos Rides	Crazy Twister	

=== Flat rides ===
Ride Name	Picture	Opened	Manufacturer/Type	Notes
The Gems World		August 2017	Area	The area includes a "Flying bikes" carousel and a monorail ride. Replaces the Hollywood Carousel.
The King		July 2017	Loop Fighter - Technical Park	Replaces the Octopus.
Star Flyer		June 2016	Star Flyer - Funtime	The tallest flat ride in Israel. (72m)
Ferris Wheel		April 2016	Ferris wheel	The tallest Ferris wheel in Israel. (60m)
Sky Craft		2013	Flaying carpet	
Cinema Luna		2013	7d cinema	
Black Mamba		2009	Space Shot	
The Candy		1988	Top Spin - Huss	
Pirate ship		1980s	Pirate ship	
Breakdancer			Breakdance - Huss	
Tagada			Tagada	
Water Slides		1990s/2006	Water Slide	There are 4 slides - two blue, and two red. The blue slides were built and opened in the early 90's, and the red ones in 2006
Power Towers		2004		
Bumper cars			Bumper cars	
Ghost Train		1970s	Dark ride	
Horses Carousel		1970s	Carousel	
Swallow Carousel				
Planes Carousel			Red baron	
Elephants Carousel		2014		Replaced the old Elephants Carousel
Safari				
Mini-boats Carousel				
Driving School				

=== Former attractions ===
Ride	Year opened	Year closed	Description
Octopus	—N/a	2016	Octopus ride, replaced by The King in 2017.
Rocket	—N/a	—N/a	Closed
Hollywood Carousel	—N/a	2016	
Chain carousel	—N/a	2014	On April 17, 2014, there was an accident which caused 22 injuries. It was replaced by the Star Flyer in 2016.
The Flying Camel	2002	—N/a	A Flying island ride.
Roller Coaster	1977	2009	A Pinfari "Zyklon" Roller coaster. After 32 years of operations it was replaced by the new Roller Coaster.
Cinema 180	—N/a	2012	Replaced by Cinema Luna in 2013
Safari Rally	—N/a	2010	Replaced by Twister
go Kart	—N/a	—N/a	Replaced by Safari
A glass maze	—N/a	2009	Replaced by Black Mamba
Ferris Wheel	—N/a	2013	It replaced the 1970 original feriis wheel and then it was replaced by the new 2016 ferris wheel.
Aerial tramway	1980s	1991	Relocated to the Superland
Plate	—N/a	2014	A Round Up
Italian carousel	—N/a	—N/a	Carousel for toddlers
The hovercraft of death	—N/a	2005	Replaced by the water slides
Loop	—N/a	—N/a	Relocated to the Superland
Planes Ride	—N/a	—N/a	Relocated to the Superland
Sky Loop	1990s	2019	
Ballerina	1970s	2019	When it opened it was painted red, then blue. In 2014 it was relocated and repainted to green.
