= SlingShot (Six Flags) =

Reverse bungee ride

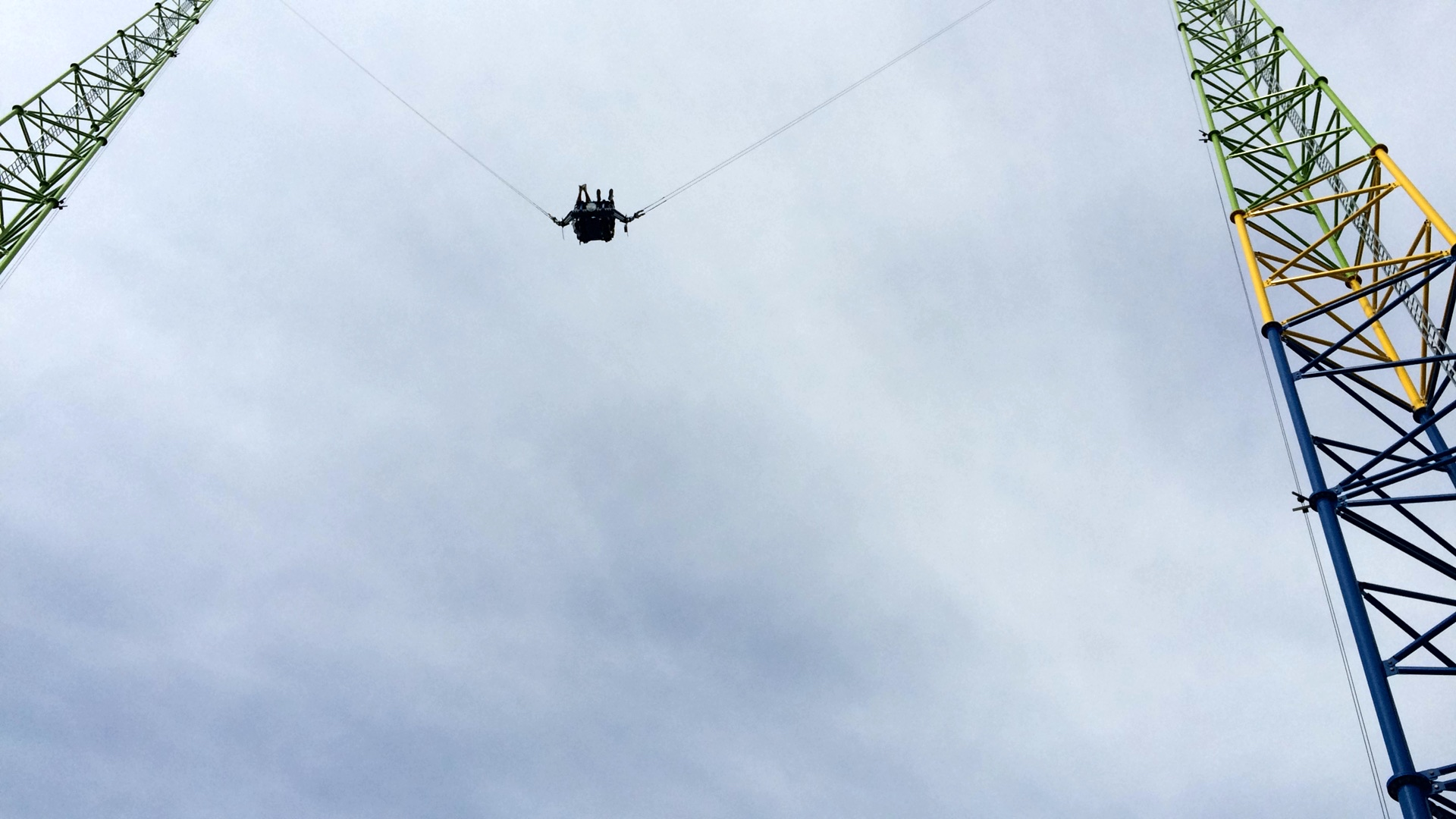
- View of an active SlingShot ride from the Gemini Midway at Cedar Point.

Cedar Point
- Area: Gemini Midway
- Status: Operating
- Soft opening date: June 2014
- Opening date: July 2, 2014

Kings Island
- Area: Oktoberfest
- Status: Removed
- Opening date: 2002
- Closing date: 2022
- Replaced: King Kobra
- Replaced by: Cargo Loco

Carowinds
- Area: Carousel Park
- Status: Operating
- Opening date: 2015

Canada's Wonderland
- Area: Action Zone
- Status: Operating
- Opening date: 2015

Ride statistics
- Manufacturer: Funtime
- Model: Sling Shot
- Speed: 62 mph (100 km/h)
- Vehicles: 1
- Riders per vehicle: 2
- Height restriction: 44 in (112 cm)
- This is a pay-per-use attraction

SlingShot is a ride manufactured by Funtime and featured at several Six Flags amusement parks, including Cedar Point, Carowinds, and Canada's Wonderland. The first installation opened at Kings Island in 2002, but the park retired the ride in 2022. An additional fee is required to ride, which is separate from park admission.

== History ==
Slingshot at Six Flags park locations first opened at Kings Island in 2002. A similar installation opened at Cedar Point in 2014. It was built by Funtime.

The ride utilizes a fluctuating price structure, where the cost increases or decreases depending on the day of the week. Riders can also purchase an on-ride video recording for an additional fee.

== Ride ==
Video of SlingShot at Cedar Point

=== Kings Island ===
SlingShot opened in 2002 and was located in the Oktoberfest area of the park. The capsule launched 275 feet (84 m) into the air reaching speeds up to 100 mph (160 km/h).

In May 2022, Kings Island made the decision to retire SlingShot permanently, citing that the reason was to "make way for future plans". The news came less than two months after a teen was killed in Florida on a drop tower ride manufactured by the same company. WSAZ confirmed that the Ohio Department of Agriculture had looked into other rides in Ohio that were also manufactured by Funtime, including SlingShot at Kings Island. Despite this, Funtime Slingshot rides continue to maintain fewer accidents than elastic model Slingshots and the Funtime manufactured slingshot ride at Cedar Point is still in operation.

=== Cedar Point ===
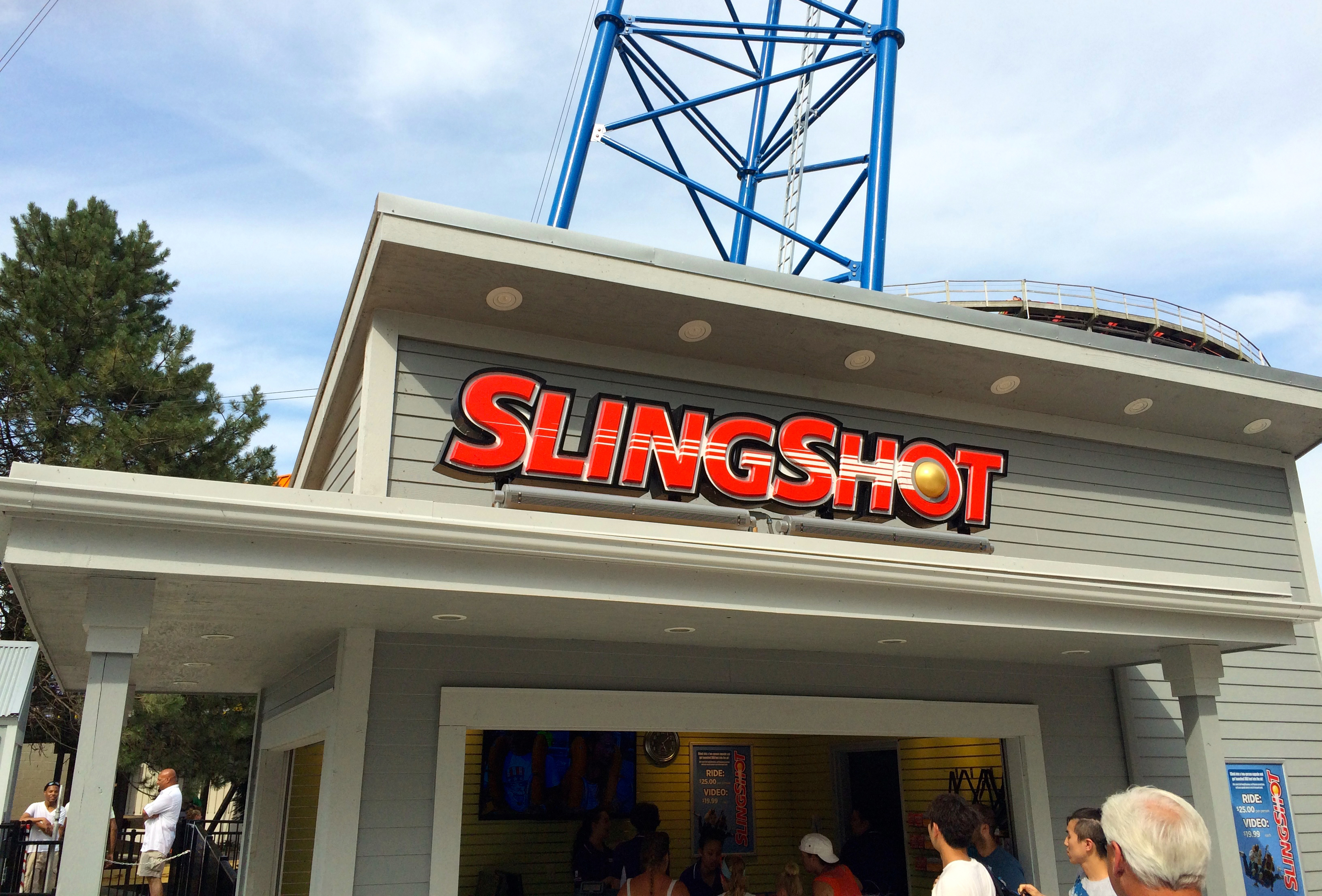
Sign above SlingShot sales booth with one of the ride's towers visible in the background.

SlingShot is 360 feet (110 m) and is located on the Gemini Midway, next to the Gemini. Riders in a two-person capsule are attached to cables and a patented spring propulsion device incorporating up to 720 specially designed springs. The capsule is launched 360 feet (110 m) into the air at 62 miles per hour (100 km/h) and bounced up and down until it comes to rest at the launch point. The ride is the second highest at Cedar Point, about 70 feet (21 m) shorter than Top Thrill 2 and 50 feet (15 m) higher than Millennium Force.

=== Carowinds ===
SlingShot located in the Carousel Park area. The capsule is launched 300 feet (91 m) into the air at speeds of 60 miles per hour (97 km/h).

=== Canada's Wonderland ===
SlingShot is located in the Action Zone area. The capsule is launched 295 feet (90 m) at speeds up to 100 kilometres per hour (62 mph).
