= Reverse bungee =

Modern type of fairground ride

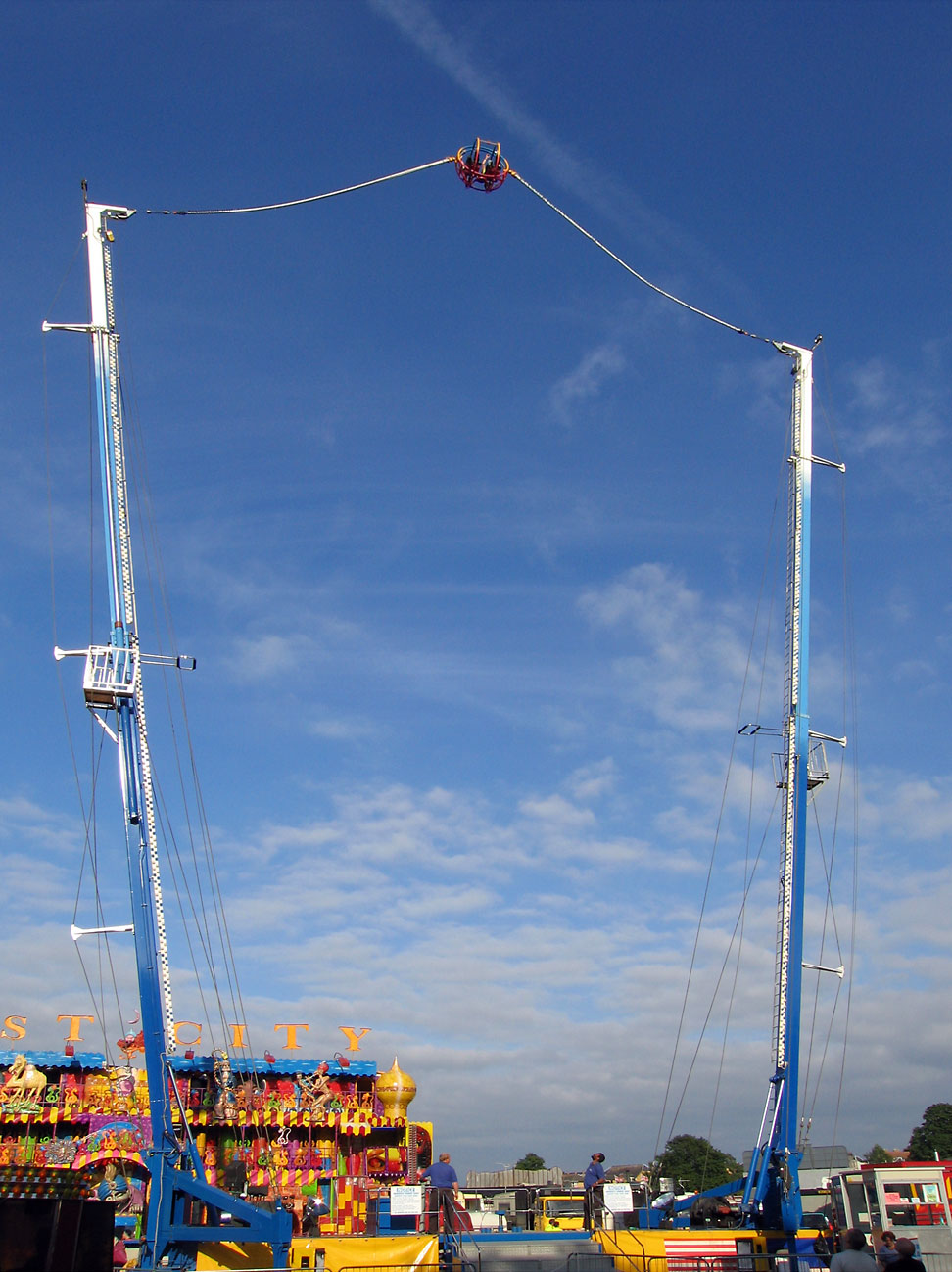
A reverse bungee launch with the passenger car nearing the top of the launch.

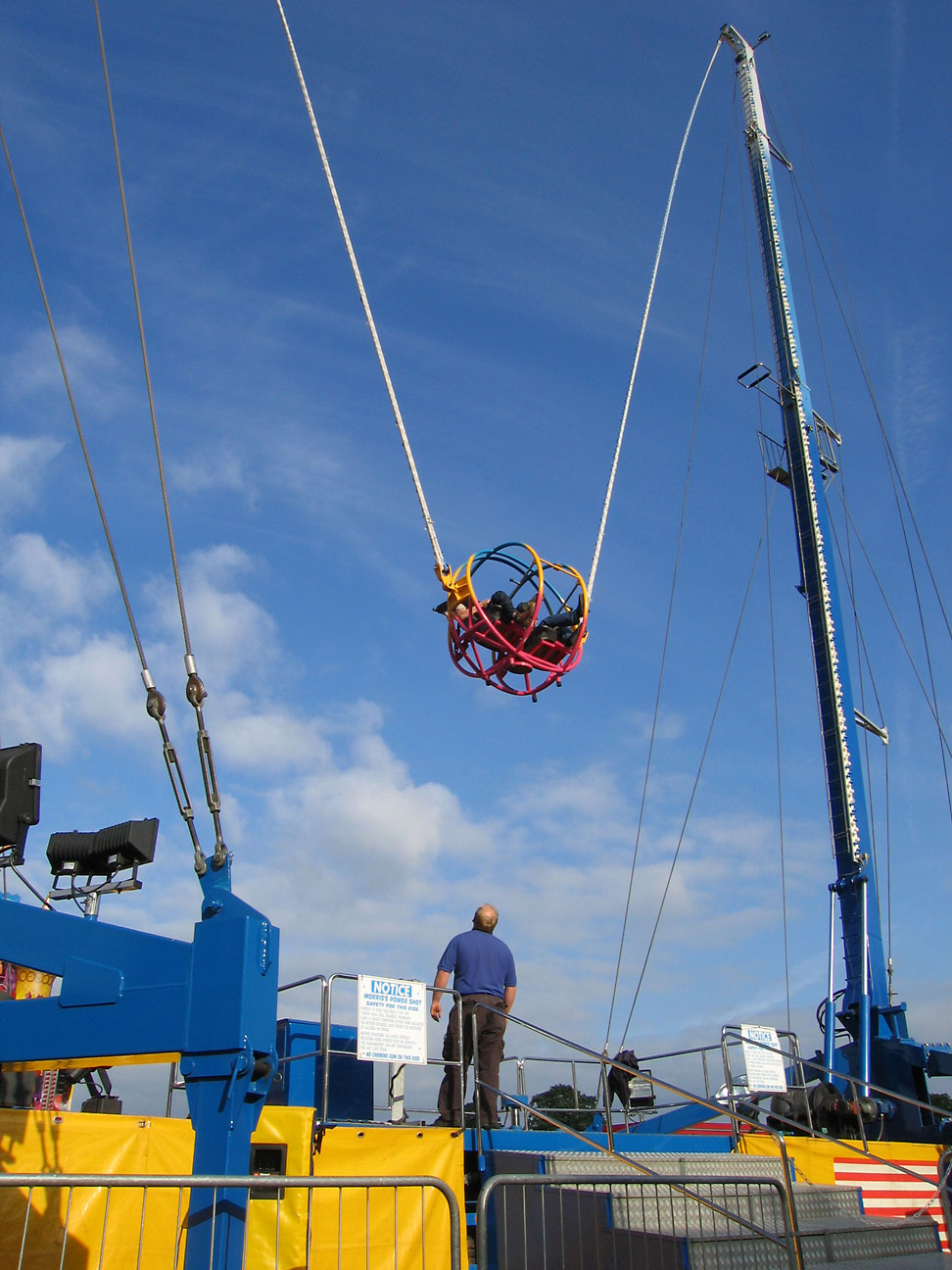
Passenger car immediately after launch.

Video of SlingShot at Cedar Point

The reverse bungee (also known as catapult bungee, slingshot, or ejection seat) is a modern type of fairground ride.

The ride consists of two telescopic gantry towers mounted on a platform, feeding two elastic ropes down to a two-person passenger car constructed from an open sphere of tubular steel. The passenger car is secured to the platform with an electro-magnetic latch as the elastic ropes are stretched. When the electromagnet is turned off, the passenger car is catapulted vertically with a g-force of 3–5, reaching an altitude of between 50 metres (164 ft) and 80 metres (262 ft).

== Installations ==
| Name | Park | Country | Manufacturer | Opened | Closed | Details |
|---|---|---|---|---|---|---|
| SlingShot | Canada's Wonderland | Canada | Funtime | 2015 | Open | Reaches heights of nearly 300 feet (91.4 m). |
| Slingshot | Carowinds | United States | Funtime | 2015 | Open | Reaches heights of up to 300 feet (91.4 m). |
| SlingShot | Cedar Point | United States | Funtime | 2014 | Open | Reaches heights of 360 feet (109.7 m). Located in Gemini Midway section of park. |
| Slingshot | Daytona Beach | United States | Funtime | | 2017 | Located on top of Boardwalk arcade. Removed after larger Sling Shot was added nearby. |
| Slingshot | Daytona Beach Screamer's Park | United States | Funtime | 2017 | Open | Replaced smaller Sling Shot located on nearby rooftop. Uploads all on-ride videos to the park's YouTube channel. |
| Slingshot | Jolly Roger Amusement Park | United States | Funtime | | Open | Monolithic structure towers. |
| Slingshot | Kings Island | United States | Funtime | 2002 | 2022 | Reaches heights of 275 feet (83.8 m). |
| Catapult | Lagoon | United States | Funtime | 2002 | Open | Reaches heights over 200 feet (61.0 m) |
| Slingshot | Luna Park | United States | Zamperla | 2011 | Open | Reaches heights of 150 feet (45.7 m). Located in the Scream Zone addition to Luna Park. |
| Orlando Slingshot | ICON Park | United States | Funtime | | Open | Allegedly reaches heights over 390 feet (118.9 m). The ride was closed for about six months for testing and additional employee training after the 2022 fall-related death of a teenager on the Orlando FreeFall ride operated at the same park. |
| Slingshot | Old Town | United States | Funtime | 2001 | Open | |
| Slingshot | Six Flags Darien Lake | United States | Funtime | | Open | Reaches heights of 300 feet (91.4 m). |
| Texas Gunslinger | Six Flags Fiesta Texas | United States | Funtime | | Open | Monolithic structure towers. Also referred to as Slingshot. |
| Slingshot | Six Flags Great Adventure | United States | Funtime | | Open | Reaches heights of 220 feet (67.1 m). |
| Nightwing | Six Flags New England | United States | Funtime | | Open | |
| Sling Shot | Magical Midway | United States | Funtime | | 2024 | Reaches heights of 240 feet (73.2 m). |

Beside this, there exist also transportable reverse bungee installations, which are sometimes installed on funfairs.

== Safety issues ==
In August 1998, Jérôme Charron died in a reverse bungee ride accident at the Ottawa Exhibition in Ottawa, Ontario, Canada when he was hurled 40 m into the air before plummeting to his death as his harness had detached. In February 2000, the firm responsible for the ride, Anderson Ventures, was fined $145,000 for this incident.
