= Bling (Blackpool Pleasure Beach) =

Former amusement ride at Pleasure Beach Resort

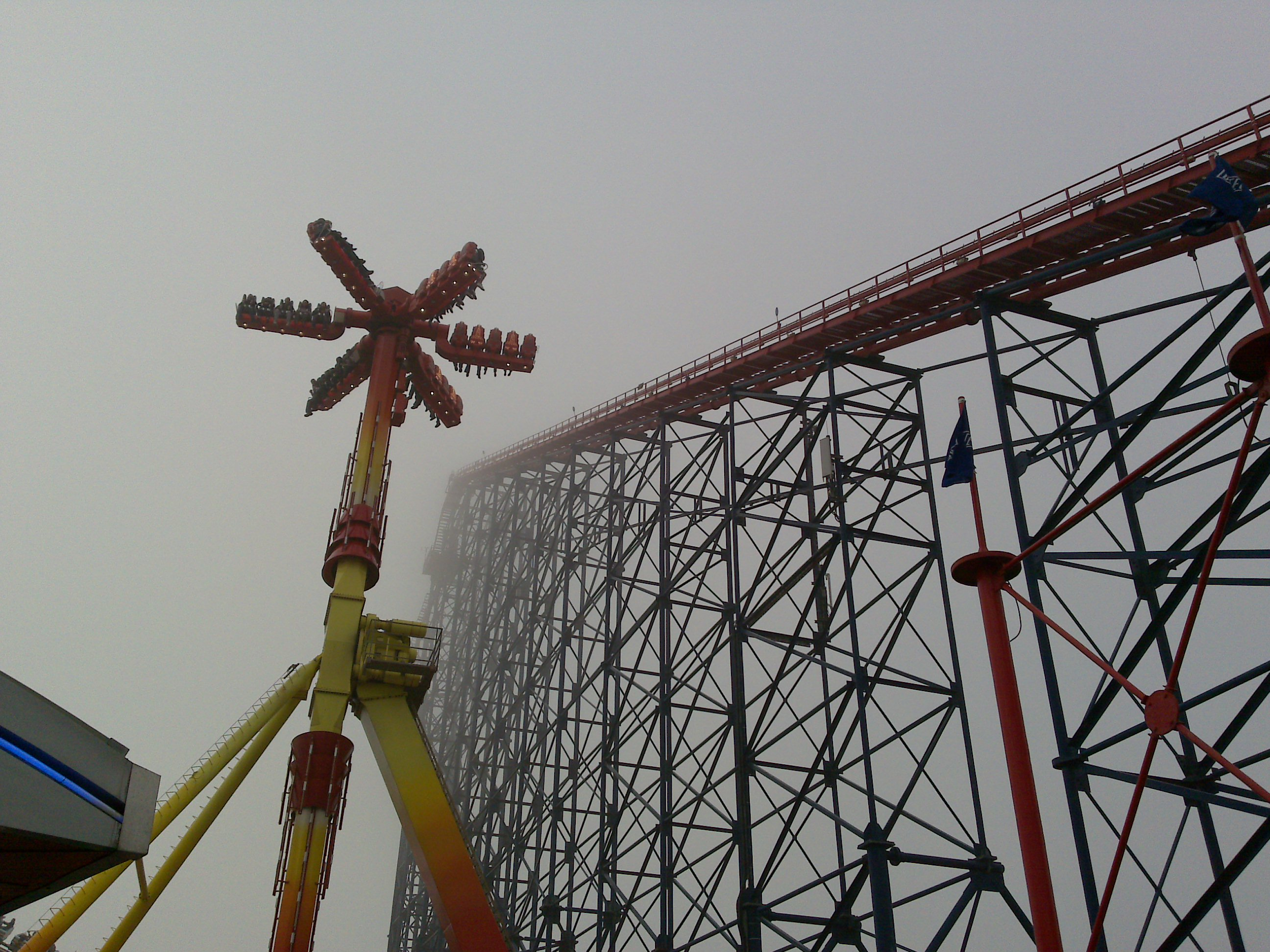
- Bling alongside The Big One

Pleasure Beach Resort
- Status: Removed
- Cost: £2,000,000
- Opening date: 1 June 2004
- Closing date: November 2011
- Replaced by: Red Arrows Sky Force

Ride statistics
- Manufacturer: Zierer
- Height: 100 ft (30 m)
- Speed: 60 mph (97 km/h)
- G-force: 2.5
- Height restriction: 48 in (122 cm)

Bling was a Zierer Star Shape ride at Pleasure Beach Resort (better known as Blackpool Pleasure Beach) in Blackpool, England. The ride opened on 1 June 2004, the second of three Star Shapes to have been built, and the only one to have been a permanent installation (the first and third operating on the travelling fair circuit in Germany and the United Kingdom, respectively). Bling was located at the far end of the park. It was the park's fourth-tallest ride after The Big One, Launch Pad, and Infusion.

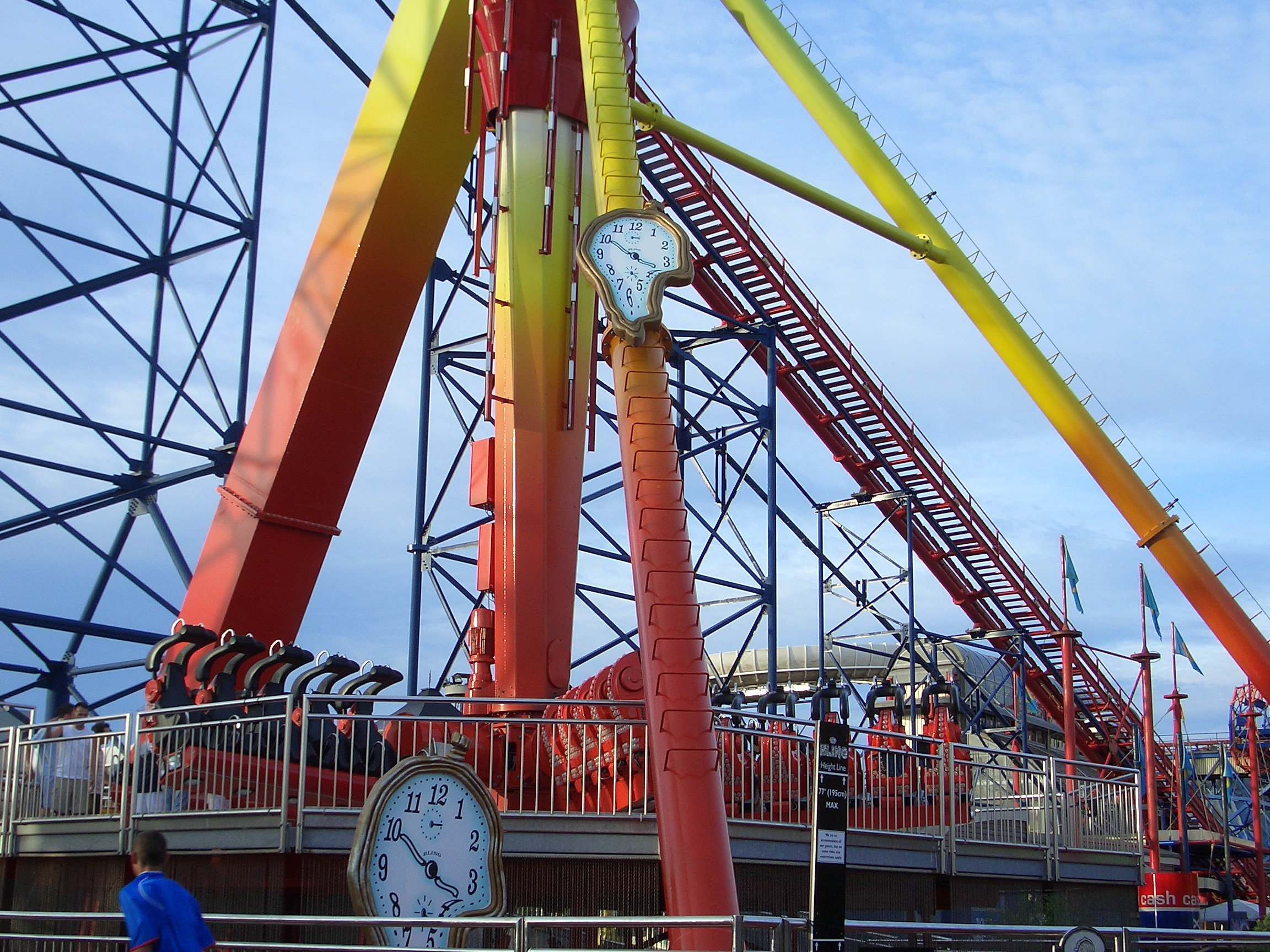
The base of Bling in a stationary position

The ride had a minimum height requirement of 122 cm (4 ft) and a maximum height allowance of 196 cm (6.4 ft). Six gondolas, which each seated five people, reached a height of 30 metres (100 ft) and spun in three different directions at speeds of up to 97 km/h (60 mph). It exerted a maximum of 2.5 Gs on riders.

The ride closed following the 2011 season, and was sold to Skyline Park in Germany, where it operated under the name Sky Jet. In 2015, the site at Pleasure Beach Resort formerly occupied by Bling was replaced by a Gerstlauer Sky Fly called Red Arrows Sky Force, which operated until the end of the 2024 season.

In 2020, Sky Jet was purchased by Mellor's Group, and it was sent to Fantasy Island. It was set to reopen as Turbulence in March 2020, replacing the former Frisbee ride, but it has yet to do so.
