= Condor (ride) =

Amusement ride

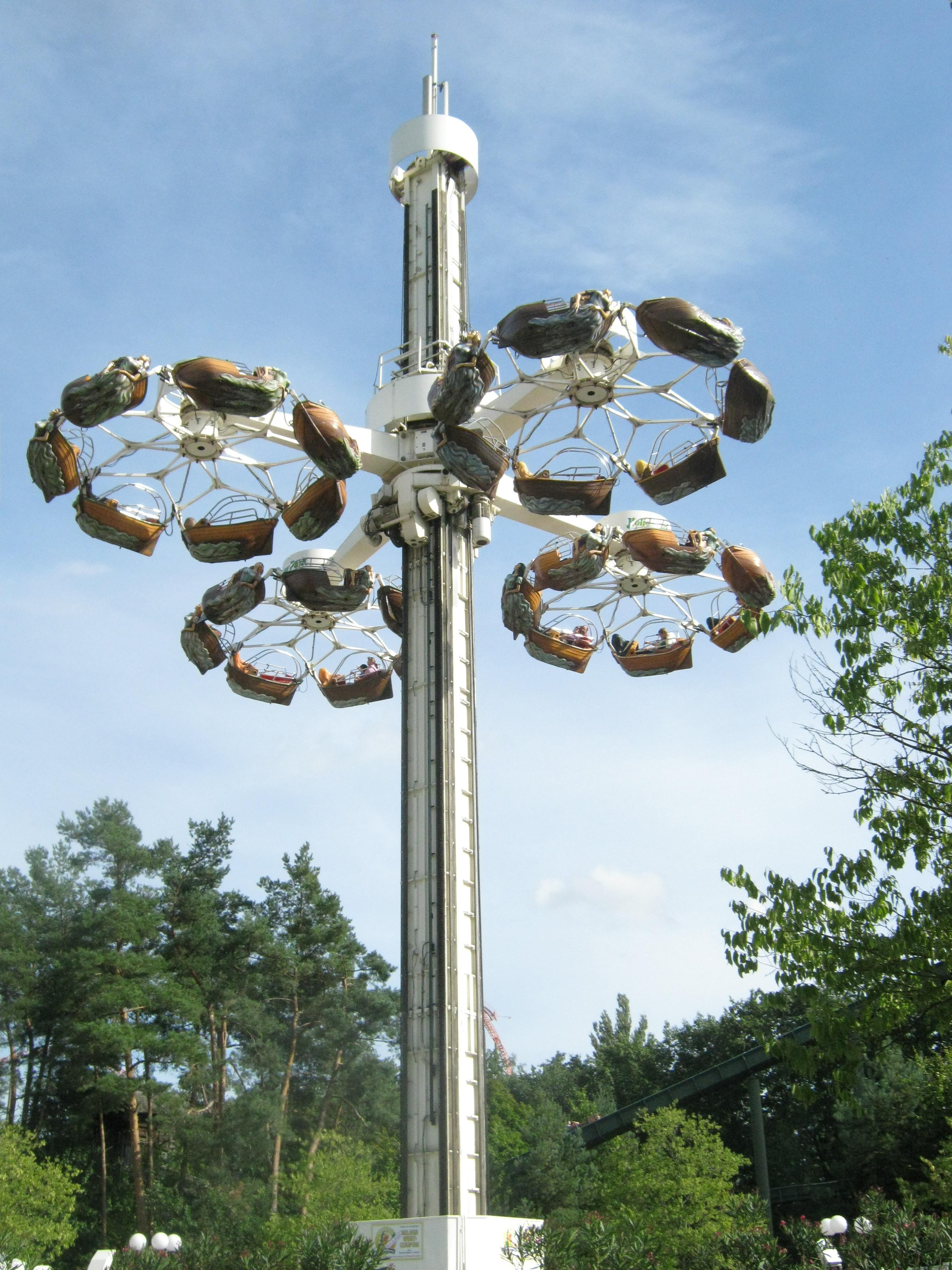
- The "Bounty Tower" at Holiday Park, Germany
- Status: In production
- Manufacturer: HUSS Park Attractions
- Variations: Condor 2GH

The Condor is an amusement ride produced by HUSS Park Attractions of Bremen, Germany. It was debuted at the 1984 New Orleans World's Fair, under the name "Cyclo Tower".

== Design ==
The Condor has 28 steel-framed gondolas, each with a fiberglass shell, frequently painted to resemble a bird. The seats hold one to two people, one sitting behind the other if they ride double. It can accommodate approximately 1,700 riders per hour. The automatic doors on the ride are operated by pneumatic air pressure and are manually opened and closed. The ride uses a cable and counterweight system within the tower to assist with the raising and lowering of the rotating assembly.

An AC induction motor located at the end of each arm rotates the gondolas; three more on the middle lifting structure rotate the entire assembly and move the tower. To start the ride, most Condors require three buttons be hit at the same time to start the cycle. The operator in the booth uses their thumbs on the two buttons located on the panel, while an attendant in a location around the perimeter must be holding that one as well.

Operators of the ride have options to operate the ride at different speeds and rotation configurations (forward and reverse), with the possibility of unique computerized programs on each ride, which can also be controlled manually. Most Condor installations are park models. An exception is one of the few remaining travelling models, Blume & Wollenschlaeger's "Ikarus-Der-Mythos". Ikarus was one of the fastest Condors still in operation, and featured different and unique manually operated ride cycles, usually with reverse rotation. Ikarus was taken off the funfair circuit and put into storage in 2007.

In 2007, Huss discontinued manufacturing new installations of the ride. In 2013, Huss re-introduced the Condor as Condor 2-G (2nd Generation).

In 2016, the first Condor 2GH (second generation hybrid) opened in Tivoli Gardens, Denmark. Called "Fatamorgana", it features both standard Condor gondolas and a "thrill version." In this variation, riders are seated in a ring, facing away from the center, and are spun around at high speed.

== Installations ==
There are several Huss Condor locations throughout the world, including

Name	Park	Location	Model	Opened	Status
Condor	Pleasure Island Family Theme Park	United Kingdom	Condor	Unknown	Removed
Hökfärden	Liseberg	Sweden	Condor	1985	Removed
Condor	Bobbejaanland	Belgium	Condor	1986	Removed
Condor	Phantasialand	Germany	Condor	1986	Removed
Taifun	Tykkimäki	Finland	Condor	1986	Removed
Condor	Morey's Piers	United States	Condor	1988	Removed
Condor	Six Flags Magic Mountain	United States	Condor	1988	Removed
Condor	Six Flags St. Louis	United States	Condor	1988	Removed
Ikarus	Gardaland	Italy	Condor	1989	Removed
Rotor	Parque de Atracciones de Madrid	Spain	Condor	1989	Operating
Sky Hawk	Marineland	Canada	Condor	1989	SBNO
The Condor	Great Escape	United States	Condor	1989	Operating
Condor	La Ronde	Canada	Condor	1990	Operating
Condor	Six Flags AstroWorld	United States	Condor	1991	Removed
Condor	Six Flags Great America; Six Flags Great Adventure	United States	Condor	1991; 1988 to 1990	Operating
Bounty Tower	Holiday Park	Germany	Condor	1994	Removed
Ikarus	Freizeit-Land Geiselwind	Germany	Condor	1994	Operating
Condor	Dream Park	Egypt	Condor	1995	Operating
Senga	Serengeti Park	Germany	Condor	1995	Removed
The Eagle	Attractiepark Slagharen	Netherlands	Condor	1998	Removed
Ikarus	Vidámpark	Hungary	Condor	1999	Removed
Drachenflug	Abenteuer Park Oberhausen	Germany	Condor	2000	Removed
Lossepladsen	BonBon-Land	Denmark	Condor	2000	Removed
Drachenflug	Belantis	Germany	Condor	2004	Operating
Le Condor	Luna Park Fréjus	France	Condor	2007	Removed
Condor	Europark Idroscola	Italy	Condor	2009	Operating
Sky Twister; Formerly Condor	Skyline Park; Heide Park	Germany	Condor	2009; 1990-2008	Operating
Ikarus	Fantasilandia	Chile	Condor	2011	Removed
Condor	Miragica	Italy	Condor	2012	Operating
Condor	Happy Valley Beijing	China	Condor 2G	2014	Operating
Atlantis	Wunderland Kalkar	Germany	Condor	2015	Operating
Giant Condor	M&D's Scotland's Theme Park	United Kingdom	Condor	2015	Operating
Fatamorgana	Tivoli Gardens	Denmark	Condor 2GH	2016	Operating
Falcon's Flight; Formerly Ikarus	Worlds of Fun; Vidámpark	United States	Condor	2017; 1999-2013	Removed
Condor	Sun Tzu Cultural Park	China	Condor 2G	2018	Operating
The Eagle	Ocean Park	Hong Kong	Condor	1994	Removed
Unknown; Formerly Flying Falcon	Niagara Amusement Park and Splash World; Hersheypark	United States	Condor	Unknown; 1990-2016	In Storage
Unknown; Formerly Cóndor	Indiana Beach; La Feria de Chapultepec	United States	Condor	Unknown; 2002-2019	In Storage

== External video ==
- An on-ride video of Morey's Piers' Condor in Wildwood, New Jersey
- Blume & Wollenschlaeger's 'Ikarus-Der-Mythos' at a fair in Tilburg, Germany
- A combination of on-ride and external shots of Morey's Piers' Condor
