= Red Arrows Sky Force =

Former amusement ride at Pleasure Beach Resort

Pleasure Beach Resort
- Status: Closed
- Opening date: 2 May 2015
- Replaced: Bling

Ride statistics
- Manufacturer: Gerstlauer
- Model: Sky Fly
- Height: 72 ft (22 m)
- Speed: 25 mph (40 km/h)
- Vehicles: 12
- Riders per vehicle: 1
- Height restriction: 48 in (122 cm)

Red Arrows Sky Force was a Gerstlauer Sky Fly ride at Pleasure Beach Resort (better known as Blackpool Pleasure Beach) in Blackpool, England. It opened on 2 May 2015, and stood at 22 metres (72 ft) tall. It had top speeds of 40 km/h (25 mph). It operated on the site of the former Bling ride, a Zierer Star Shape that was closed in 2011.

== History ==
After the closure of Bling following the 2011 season, the site which it operated on, immediately south of The Big One's lift hill, remained empty, with the exception of a few potted plants.

Towards the end of the 2014 season, the park announced they had partnered with the Red Arrows, a Royal Air Force aerobatic team, to install Red Arrows Sky Force for the 2015 season.

Red Arrows Sky Force had an opening ceremony headed by Amanda Thompson, managing director of Pleasure Beach Resort, on 2 May 2015. The ride operated until the end of the 2024 season. By the 2025 season, the ride vehicles had been removed, while the ride's base and its queue lines remained.
