= Superland =

Amusement park in Rishon LeZion, Israel

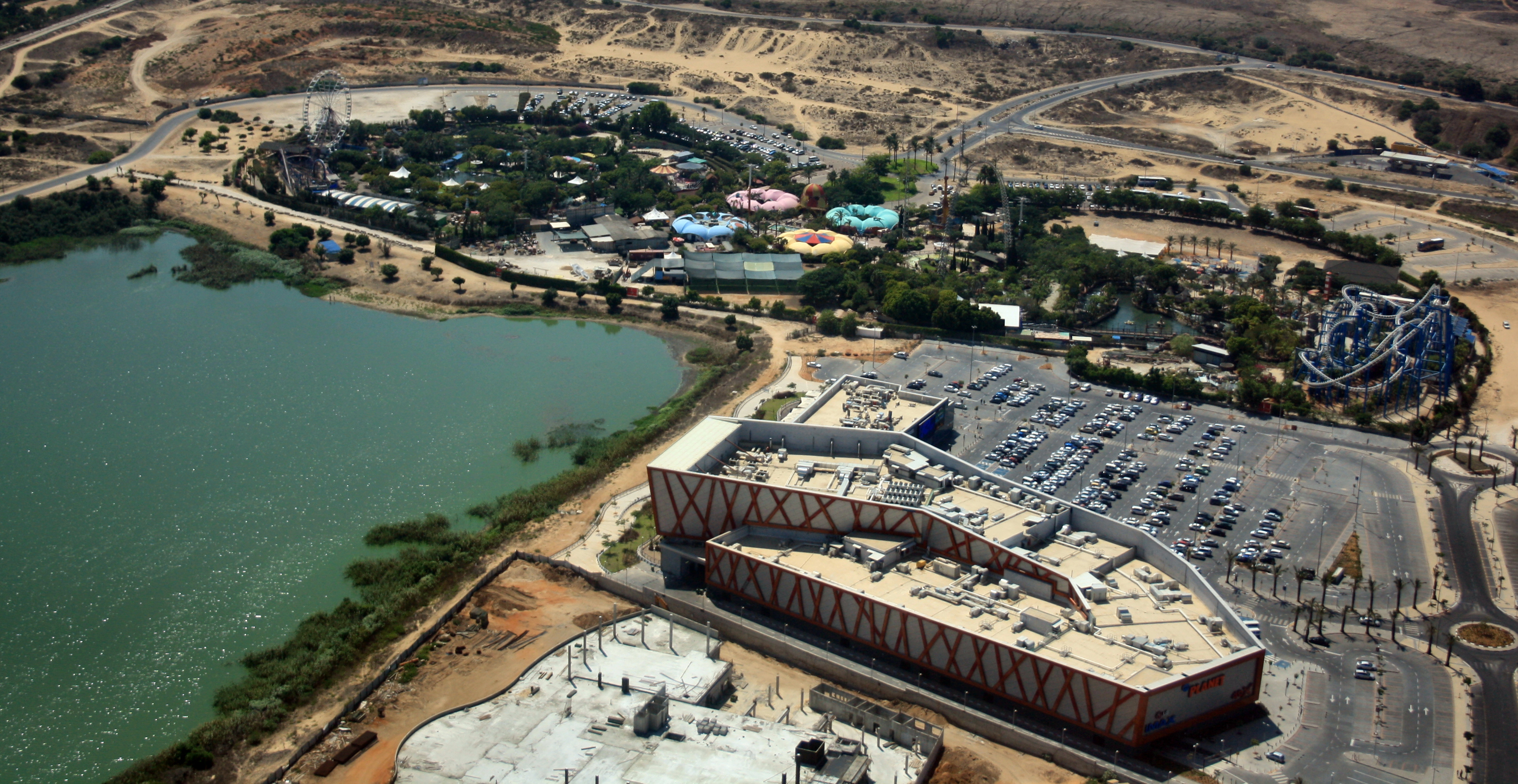
- Superland, 2013
- Interactive map of Superland
- Location: Rishon LeZion, Israel
- Coordinates: 31°58′42″N 34°44′38″E
- Opened: 1991
- Owner: Entertainment Town Ltd.

Attractions
- Total: 19
- Roller coasters: 2
- Water rides: 2

Superland is an amusement park in Rishon LeZion, Israel. Superland covers an area of about 19.8 acres (8.0 ha) and has three roller coasters, three wet and dry facilities, a cablecar, and a bungee jumping "Skycoaster."

Superland opened to the public in 1991 and is one of the main amusement parks in Israel, along with Luna Park in Tel Aviv, My Baby in Yarka Zapari Birds park in Tel Aviv.

In 2013, there was controversy over an alleged policy of separating days when Jewish vs. Arab schools could have trips to the facility. Superland claims this was done at the request of the schools themselves (on both the Jewish and Arab sides) but both Israeli Jews and Israeli Arabs have criticized that the park should have rejected such requests.

== Attractions ==
=== Roller coasters ===
Ride Name	Picture	Opened	Manufacturer	Model/Type	Notes
Kumba		June 16, 2001	Vekoma	Suspended Looping Coaster 689m Standard	The tallest, fastest, longest roller coaster in Israel. Also the most inversions in a roller coaster in Israel.
Kids' Roller Coaster		May 2009	Zamperla	Family Gravity Coaster 80STD	The first kids' roller coaster in Israel.

=== Flat rides ===
Ride Name	Picture	Opened	Type/Manufacturer	Notes
Ferris Wheel		1991	Ferris wheel	The Ferris Wheel was closed and dismantled in 2015 for renovation and painting. It was assembled and reopened to the public in 2016.
Falls of Horror		1991	Log flume - Zamperla	
Congo		1990s	River Rapids - Intamin	
Traum Boot/Dreams Ship		1991	Traum Boot - Weber	It operated at Luna Park, Tel Aviv until the opening of the Superland in 1991.
Skycoaster		1990s	Skycoaster - Ride Entertainment Group	
Grand Canyon		1990s	Super Nova - Mondial	
Rocket			Telecombat - Zamperla	
Bumper cars			Bumper cars - Zamperla	
Mini Bumper cars		2008	Mini Bumper cars - Zamperla	
Swans in the lake		1991		
Tea Cups			Mini Tea Cup - Zamperla	
Musical Carousel			Merry Go Round - Zamperla	
Chain carousel			Wave Swinger - Zierer	
Samba Balloon		2009	Balloon Race - Zamperla	
lighthouse		2009	Zamperla	
Rocking Tug		2009	Rocking Tug - Zamperla	
Aerial tramway			Aerial tramway	It operated at Luna Park, Tel Aviv in the 1990s.
Planes Ride				Relocated from Luna Park, Tel Aviv
Skyfall		2024	Skyfall - Funtime	
Typhoon 360		2022	Technical Park - Typhoon 360	

=== Former attractions ===
Ride	Year opened	Year closed	Description
Karting	1990s	1990s	Go-Kart for adults.
Loop 2000	1991	2013	Pinfari - ZL42
