= Fun Time (TV series) =

Canadian children's television series

- Country of origin: Canada
- Original language: English
- No. of seasons: 1

Production
- Producer: Roger Racine

Original release
- Network: CBC Television
- Release: 5 July 1956 – 1 February 1957

Fun Time is a Canadian children's television series that aired on CBC Television from 1956 to 1957.

== Premise ==
The series featured Captain Frank (Frank Heron), his Fun Time Showboat and his parrot Matey. Episodes began with magic tricks by Magic Tom (Tom Auburn) or with juggling. Alan Jack and June Mack demonstrated how to play games, and were featured with Captain Frank in adventure segments filmed at various locations. Traffic and water safety lessons were given by Elmer the Safety Elephant. The show's orchestra was led by Otto Muller.

== Production ==
Fun Time was produced in Montreal.

== Scheduling ==
This half-hour series aired Thursdays at 5:30 p.m. (Eastern) from 5 July to 27 September 1956, then Fridays at 5:00 p.m. from 5 October 1956 until the last broadcast on 1 February 1957.
