= Funtime (manufacturer) =

Austria-based amusement ride manufacturer

- Type: Private
- Industry: Manufacturing
- Founded: 1998
- Headquarters: Dölsach, Tyrol, Austria
- Area served: Worldwide
- Products: Amusement rides
- Website: www.funtime.com.au

Funtime is an amusement ride manufacturer based in Dölsach, Austria and Bundall, Australia. The company manufactures rides such as the Sling Shot, Star Flyer, and Vomatron.

Ride Entertainment handles the distribution and operation of rides in North America.

== History ==
In 1998, Funtime was established in the suburb of Bundall on the Gold Coast, Australia. Shortly after, the company opened a small amusement park in Surfers Paradise, a nearby Gold Coast suburb. At the time, the amusement park was known as Adrenalin Park and featured the company's Sling Shot and Vomatron rides.

In 2010, Funtime threatened legal action against Dutch amusement ride manufacturer, Mondial, after that company unveiled the WindSeeker which bears similarities to Funtime's patented Star Flyer ride. Mondial responded to the threat by stating that "there is no merit to Funtime's claim". The matter did not progress.

In 2015 Funtime and Ride Entertainment Group partnered to open 2 Sing Shot rides at Canada’s Wonderland (Vaughn, Ontario, Canada) and Carowinds (Charlotte, North Carolina, USA). They would both continue to open additional rides in North America, as well as beginning to unveil Star Flyers at Six Flag amusement parks under this partnership.

On June 1, 2018, Unicorp opened a new Star Flyer in Orlando that marked the world tallest Star Flyer of 400 ft above ground and was manufactured by Funtime.

== Products ==
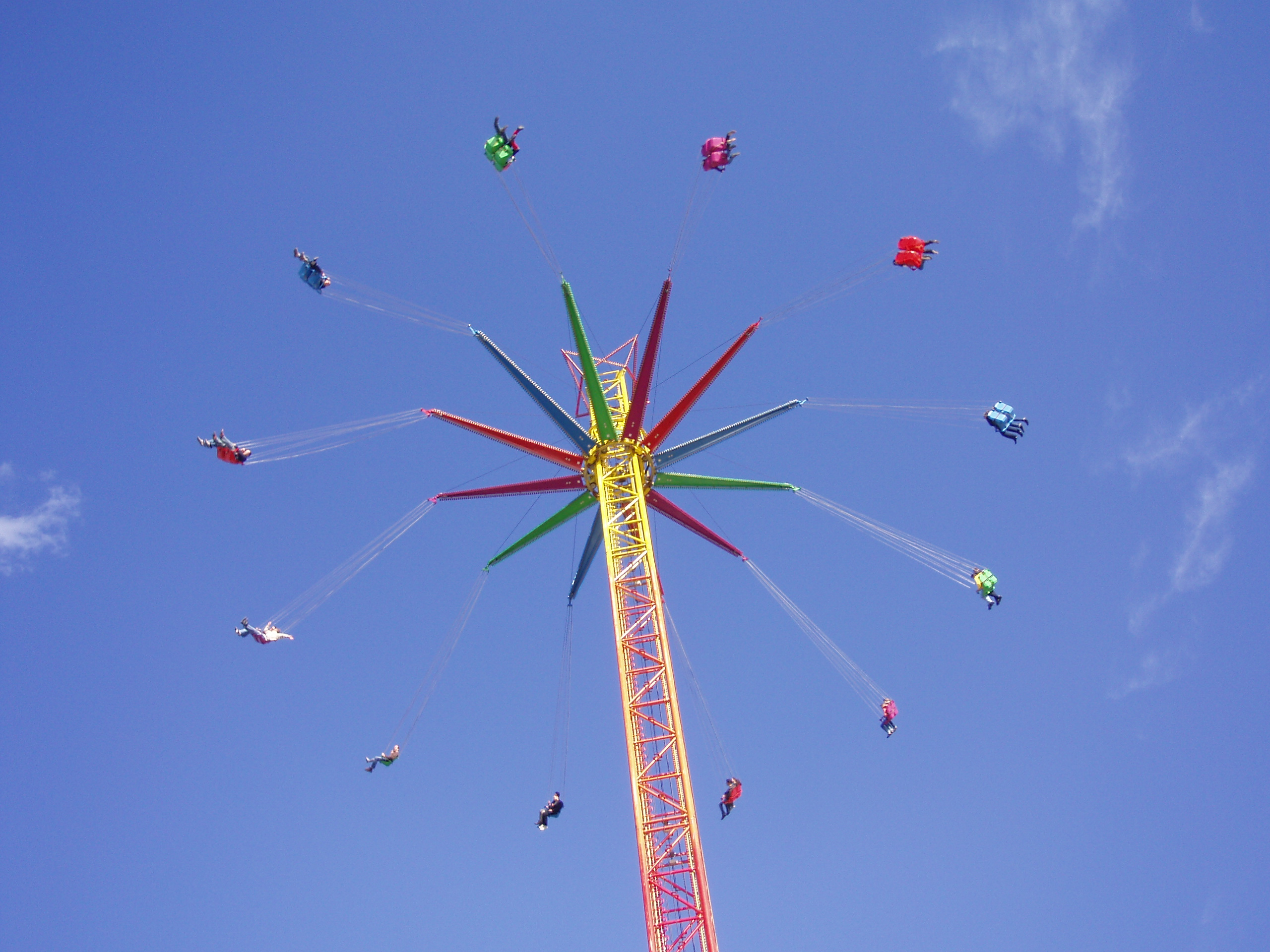
A Star Flyer

- The Bell – a ride similar to a Frisbee, except they are located inside a giant bell
- Chaos Pendle – riders are mounted on the ends of several arms and spun around in a propeller-like fashion
- Rocket – riders are harnessed into a rocket shaped car which is raised into the air and spun around a tower and on its own axis
- Sky Diver – an amusement ride similar to a Skycoaster where riders are winched to the top of a launch tower and then dropped towards the ground, swinging from a cable tether back and forth until brought to a rest
- Sling Shot – a reverse bungee ride where passengers are propelled over 100 metres at speeds in the region of 160 kilometres per hour. The machine does not utilise rubber ropes or bungee cords as in a slingshot, but is powered by a patented spring propulsion device incorporating up to 720 specially designed springs. The SlingShot can be custom designed to cause minimal disruption to existing venues.
- Star Flyer – a variation of the traditional swing ride where riders are swung around the top of a tower
- Tornado – a ride that simulates a tornado by sending riders in a figure-eight motion
- Vomatron – a type of ride similar to the centrifuges used in astronaut training, except on a vertical axis
- Skyfall – currently the highest transportable drop tower in the world with a height of 80 metres (260 ft)

== Ride installations ==
Ride name	Park	Location	Model	Opened	Status	Details
Adirondack Outlaw	Six Flags Great Escape	United States	Vomatron	2021	Operating	
Allgäuflieger	Skyline Park	Germany	Star Flyer	2020	Operating	One of The Tallest Swing Rides in the world. 465–493 feet (142–150 m)
AtmosFear	Playland	Canada	Star Flyer	2011	Operating	
Black Mamba	Wiener Prater	Austria	Chaos Pendle	2011	Operating	
Catwoman Whip	Six Flags St. Louis	United States	Vomatron	2022	Operating	
Catapult	Lagoon	United States	Sling Shot	2002	Operating	
Die Glocke	Hansa-Park	Germany	The Bell	2006	Removed 2019	Replaced by Awilda's World
Donjon de l’Extrême	Nigloland	France	Skyfall	2016	Operating	
Drop Line	Dollywood	United States	Skyfall	2017	Operating	
Eclipse	Gröna Lund	Sweden	Star Flyer	2013	Operating	
El Grito	Djurs Sommerland	Denmark	Skyfall	2024	Operating	60 meters (200 feet) tall.
FlyOver	Fantasilandia	Chile	Star Flyer	2018	Operating	
HangOver The Tower	Ewald Schneider	Germany	Skyfall	2015	Operating	Travels on the fair circuit and is 85 meters (279 feet) tall.
Highlander	Hansa-Park	Germany	Skyfall	2019	Operating	395 feet (120 meters) tall.
Himmelskibet	Tivoli Gardens	Denmark	Star Flyer	2006	Operating	
Lighthouse Tower	Holiday Park	Germany	Star Flyer	2006	Operating	
Merlí	Tibidabo Amusement Park	Spain	Skyfall	2024	Operating	50 meters (160 feet) tall.
Merlin and the Magic Circle	Freizeit-Land Geiselwind	Germany	Sling Shot	2021	Operating	
Mega Mindy Flyer	Plopsa Coo	Belgium	Star Flyer	2010	Operating	
New England SkyScreamer	Six Flags New England	United States	Star Flyer	2014	Operating	Eighth Starflyer at a Six Flags park; 403-feet tall.
North Star	Valleyfair	United States	Star Flyer	2017	Operating	230 feet (70.1 m) tall.
Orlando FreeFall	ICON Park	United States	Skyfall	2021	Removed 2022	The ride was closed after the fall related death of Tyre Sampson, aged 14, in March 2022.
Orlando Slingshot	ICON Park	United States	Sling Shot	2021	Operating	
Orlando StarFlyer	ICON Park	United States	Star Flyer	2018	Operating	Opened as the World's Tallest Swing ride at 450 feet tall.
Prater Turm	Wiener Prater	Austria	Star Flyer	2010	Operating	385 feet (117 meters) tall
ROX-Flyer; Formerly SpringFlyer	Plopsaland	Belgium	Star Flyer	2006	Operating	
Sky Diver	Walibi Holland	Netherlands	Sky Diver	1994	Operating	
Sky Diver	Walibi Belgium	Belgium	Sky Diver	2004	Removed 2006	
SkyFall	Michael Goetzke	Germany	Skyfall	2013	Operating	Travels on the fair circuit and is 80 meters (260 feet) tall.
SkyFall	Superland	Israel	Skyfall	2024	Operating	
Six Flags SkyScreamer	Six Flags Darien Lake	United States	Star Flyer	2019	Operating	
SkyScreamer	Six Flags Discovery Kingdom	United States	Star Flyer	2011	Operating	
SkyScreamer	Six Flags Great Adventure	United States	Star Flyer	2012	Operating	
SkyScreamer	Six Flags Over Georgia	United States	Star Flyer	2013	Operating	
SkyScreamer	Six Flags St. Louis	United States	Star Flyer	2011	Operating	
Sky Shot	Skyline Park	Germany	Sling Shot	2000	Operating	90 meters tall
Sling Shot	Funtime	Australia	Sling Shot	Unknown	Operating	
Sling Shot	Magical Midway	United States	Sling Shot	Unknown	Removed 2024	
Sling Shot	Kentucky Kingdom	United States	Sling Shot	2002	Operating	
Sling Shot	Elitch Gardens	United States	Sling Shot	2006	Operating	
Sling Shot	Six Flags Magic Mountain	United States	Sling Shot	2012	Removed 2019	Last operated in 2019 and never reopened due to high maintenance costs. Removed in September 2022.
Sling Shot	Six Flags Great Adventure	United States	Sling Shot	2011	Operating	
Sling Shot	Six Flags St. Louis	United States	Sling Shot	2002	2008	
Sling Shot	Six Flags Mexico	Mexico	Sling Shot	2013	Operating	60 meters tall.
Sling Shot	Carowinds	United States	Sling Shot	2015	Operating	
Sling Shot	Cedar Point	United States	Sling Shot	2015	Operating	
Sling Shot	Kings Island	United States	Sling Shot	2002	2022	
Sling Shot	Canada's Wonderland	Canada	Sling Shot	2015	Operating	
Sling Shot	Al-Shallal Theme Park	Saudi Arabia	Sling Shot	Unknown	Operating	
Sling Shot	Old Town	United States	Sling Shot	November 2001	Operating	
Snake	Gröna Lund	Sweden	Chaos Pendle	2019	Operating	
Spring Shot	Morey's Piers	United States	Sling Shot	Unknown	Operating	
Star Flyer	Divo Ostrov	Russia	Star Flyer	Unknown	Operating	
Sling Shot	Parko Paliatso	Cyprus	Sling Shot	1999	Operating	90 meters tall.
Star Flyer	Elitch Gardens	United States	Star Flyer	2017	Operating	17 stories tall.
Star Flyer	Greenland Kyushu	Japan	Star Flyer	2012	Operating	
Star Flyer	Allou Fun Park	Greece	Star Flyer	2008	Operating	
Star Flyer	Luna Park Tel Aviv	Israel	Star Flyer	2016	Operating	
Star Flyer	Magical Midway	United States	Star Flyer	2006	Removed 2024	
Star Flyer	Manchester Town Centre	United Kingdom	Star Flyer	Unknown	Operating	
Star Flyer	Nagashima Spa Land	Japan	Star Flyer	2012	Operating	Height of around 63.4 metres (208 ft)
Star Flyer	Oktoberfest	Germany	Star Flyer	Unknown	Unknown	
Star Flyer	Pacific National Exhibition	Canada	Star Flyer	Unknown	Unknown	
Star Flyer	Parque de Atracciones de Madrid	Spain	Star Flyer	2010	Operating	80 meters tall
Star Flyer	Steel Pier	United States	Star Flyer	N/A	Never Materialized	
Star Flyer	Tykkimäki	Finland	Star Flyer	2009	Operating	
Stars Flyer; Formerly Bollywood Skyflyer	Real Madrid World	United Arab Emirates	Star Flyer	2021	Operating	Tallest swing ride in the world at 460 feet in height, was manufactured and intended for the cancelled Six Flags Dubai.
Stupet	Kongeparken	Norway	Skyfall	2019	Operating	
Supergirl Sky Flight; Formerly SkyScreamer	Six Flags Fiesta Texas	United States	Star Flyer	2012	Operating	
Supergirl Sky Flight; Formerly SkyScreamer	Six Flags Mexico	Mexico	Star Flyer	2015	Operating	
Tekkotsubanchou – Sky Tower Swinger	Fuji-Q Highland	Japan	Star Flyer	Unknown	Operating	First Skyflyer in Japan.
Texas Gunslinger	Six Flags Fiesta Texas	United States	Sling Shot	2013	Operating	
Texas SkyScreamer	Six Flags Over Texas	United States	Star Flyer	2013	Operating	
Texas Star Flyer	Galveston Island Historic Pleasure Pier	United States	Star Flyer	2012	Operating	
Tornado	Terra Mítica	Spain	Star Flyer	2015	Operating	
Torre del Mar	Hansa-Park	Germany	Star Flyer	2005	Removed 2015	
Tornado	Wiener Prater	Austria	Tornado	2007	Operating	
Vol Ultime	La Ronde	Canada	Star Flyer	2012	Operating	
Vomatron	Funtime	Australia	Vomatron	Unknown	Operating	
Vomatron	Old Town	United States	Vomatron	Unknown	Operating	
Wonder Woman Lasso of Truth	Six Flags America	United States	Star Flyer	2017	Operating	242 feet (73.8 m) ft tall.
Unknown	COTALAND	United States	Star Flyer	2026	operating	
Unknown	COTALAND	United States	Skyfall	2026	operating	

== Amusement park ==
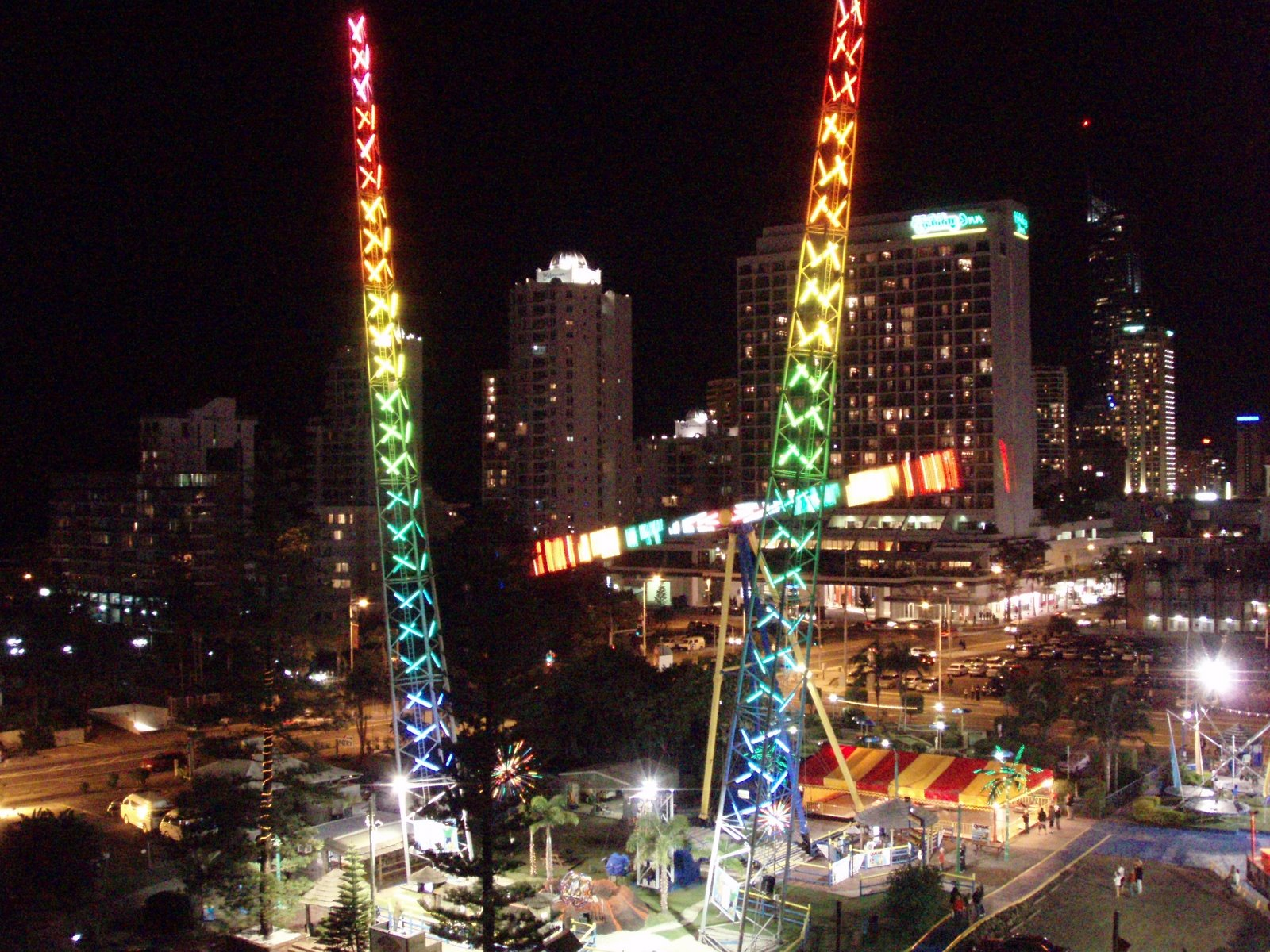
Adrenalin Park in 2007

Funtime operates a small amusement park in the centre of Surfers Paradise, aptly named Funtime. The park features installations of their Sling Shot and Vomatron rides. The park was previously known as Adrenalin Park and featured several other rides and attractions, including an Intamin Parachute Drop tower, a mini golf course and a bungee tower.

== See also ==
- Category:Amusement rides manufactured by Funtime
- Booster (Fabbri ride), an amusement ride similar to the Vomatron
- Speed (ride), another amusement ride similar to the Vomatron
