= Funtime (amusement park) =

Amusement park in Surfers Paradise, Australia

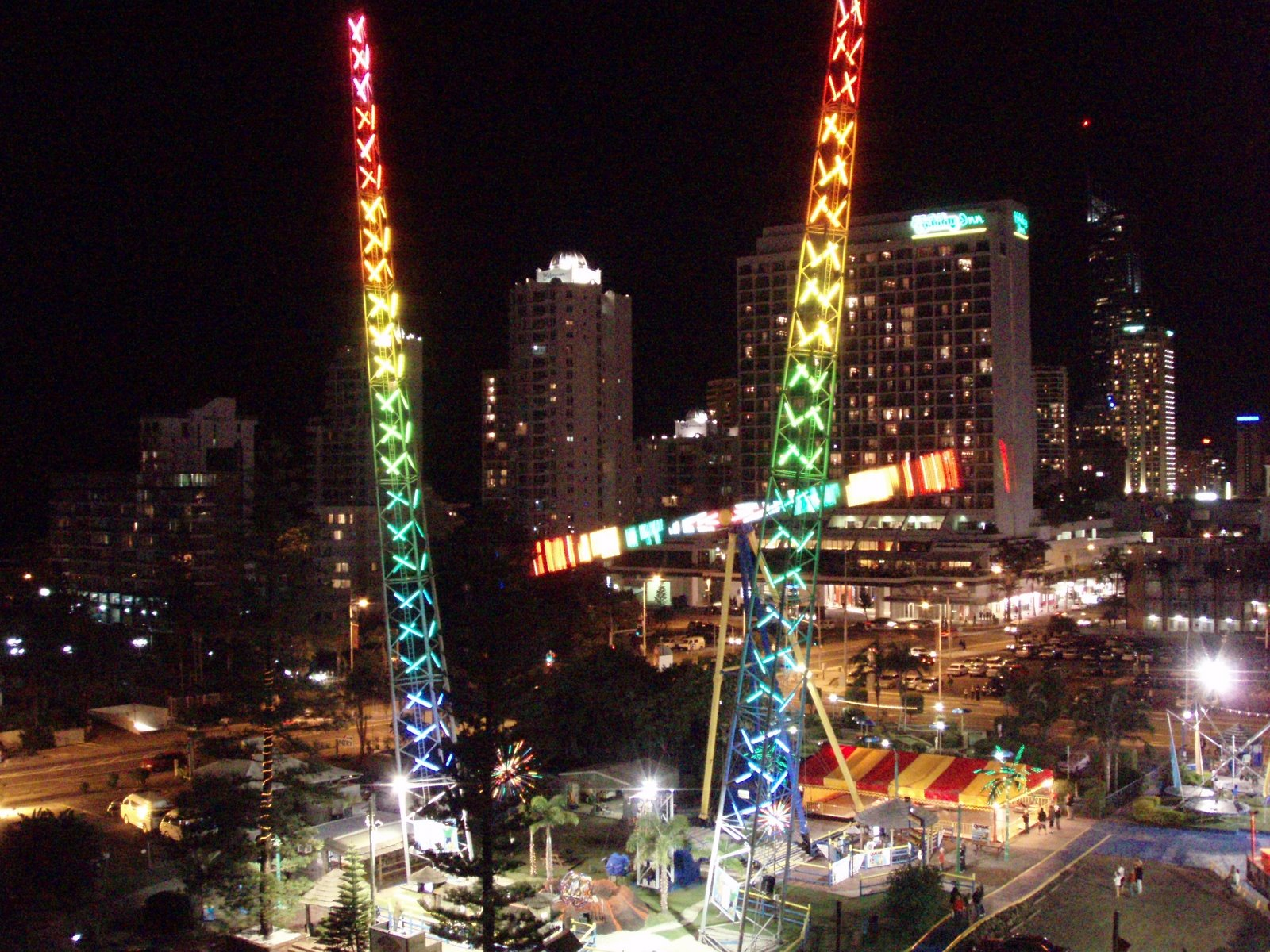
Adrenalin Park in 2007

Funtime is a small amusement park in the centre of Surfers Paradise, City of Gold Coast, Queensland, Australia, operated by the Funtime amusement ride manufacturing company of Austria. The park features installations of their Sling Shot and Vomatron rides. The park was previously known as Adrenalin Park and featured several other rides and attractions including an Intamin Parachute Drop tower, a mini golf course and a bungy tower.
