= Star Flyer (Tivoli Gardens) =

Amusement ride in Copenhagen, Denmark

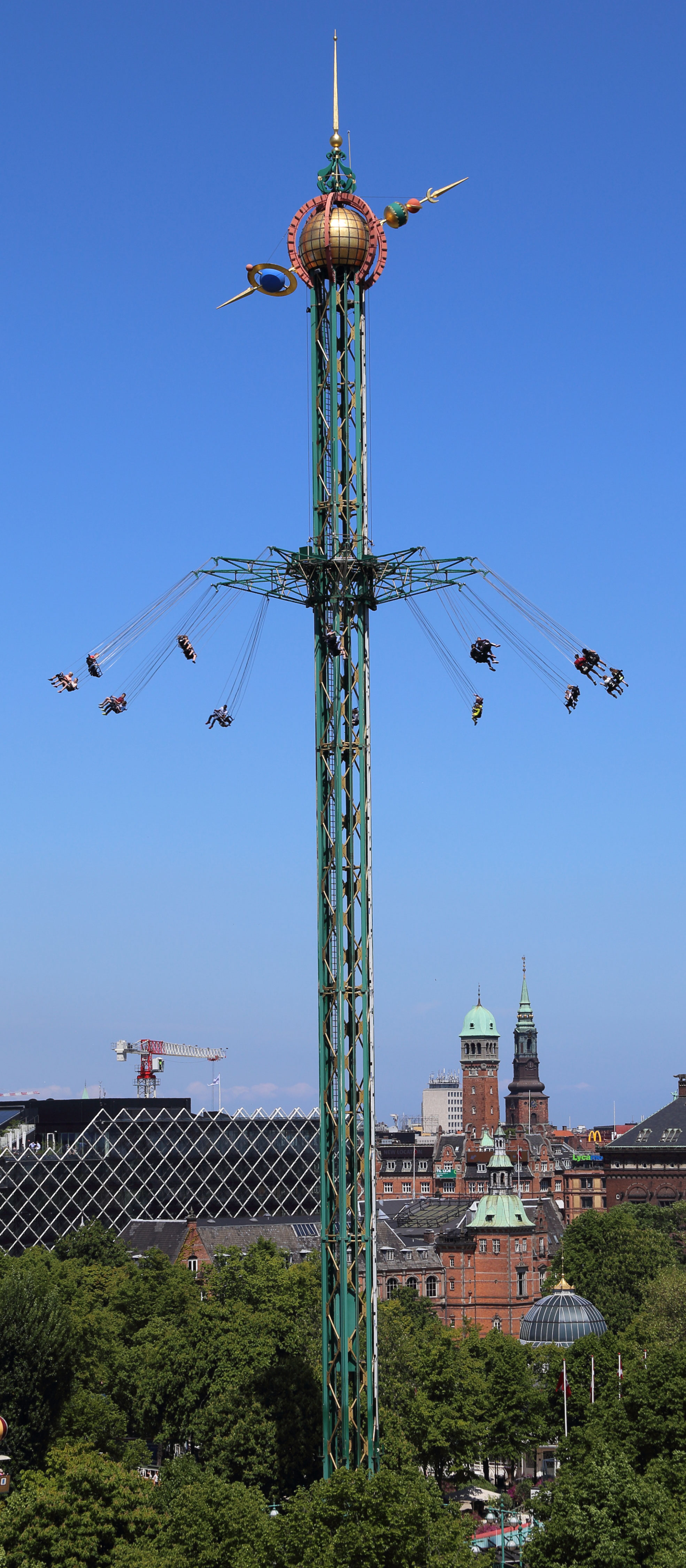
- The Star Flyer

Tivoli Gardens
- Coordinates: 55°40′21″N 12°34′04″E
- Status: Operating
- Opening date: 2006

Ride statistics
- Attraction type: StarFlyer
- Manufacturer: Funtime
- Height: 80 m (260 ft)
- Speed: 70 km/h (43 mph)
- Capacity: 960 riders per hour
- Vehicle type: Chairs
- Vehicles: 12
- Riders per vehicle: 2

Star Flyer (Danish: Himmelskibet) is a carousel-meets-watchtower style amusement ride in Tivoli Gardens, Copenhagen, Denmark. It was manufactured by Funtime and opened in May 2006.

== Statistics ==
- Height 80 m (260 ft)
- Platform diameter 16 m (52 ft)
- Chairs 12 (2 seats each)
- Capacity circa 960 passengers/hour
- Maximum rotation speed 70 km/h (43 mph)
- Maximum vertical speed 3 m/s (9.8 ft/s)

Preceded by unknown	World's Tallest Swing Ride; May 2006–2010	Succeeded by Prater Turm at Wurstelprater
