= Old Town (amusement park) =

Entertainment complex in Florida, United States

- Interactive map of Old Town
- Location: Kissimmee, Florida, United States
- Coordinates: 28.331610°N 81.515838°W
- Status: Operating
- Opened: 1986
- Owner: The Travel Corporation
- Theme: Classic and retro pop culture
- Website: www.myoldtownusa.com

Old Town is an open-air walking district and entertainment complex, located in Kissimmee, Florida. Operating since December 1986, it is the re-creation of a classic Florida town featuring historical architecture and distinctive storefronts with some seventy unique shops, restaurants, bars, attractions, and rides. Following two years of renovations, Old Town celebrated its re-opening in April 2019 with the addition of an 86-foot Ferris wheel. Old Town's Saturday Classic Car Show & Cruise billed as the longest-running weekly car show and cruise in America.

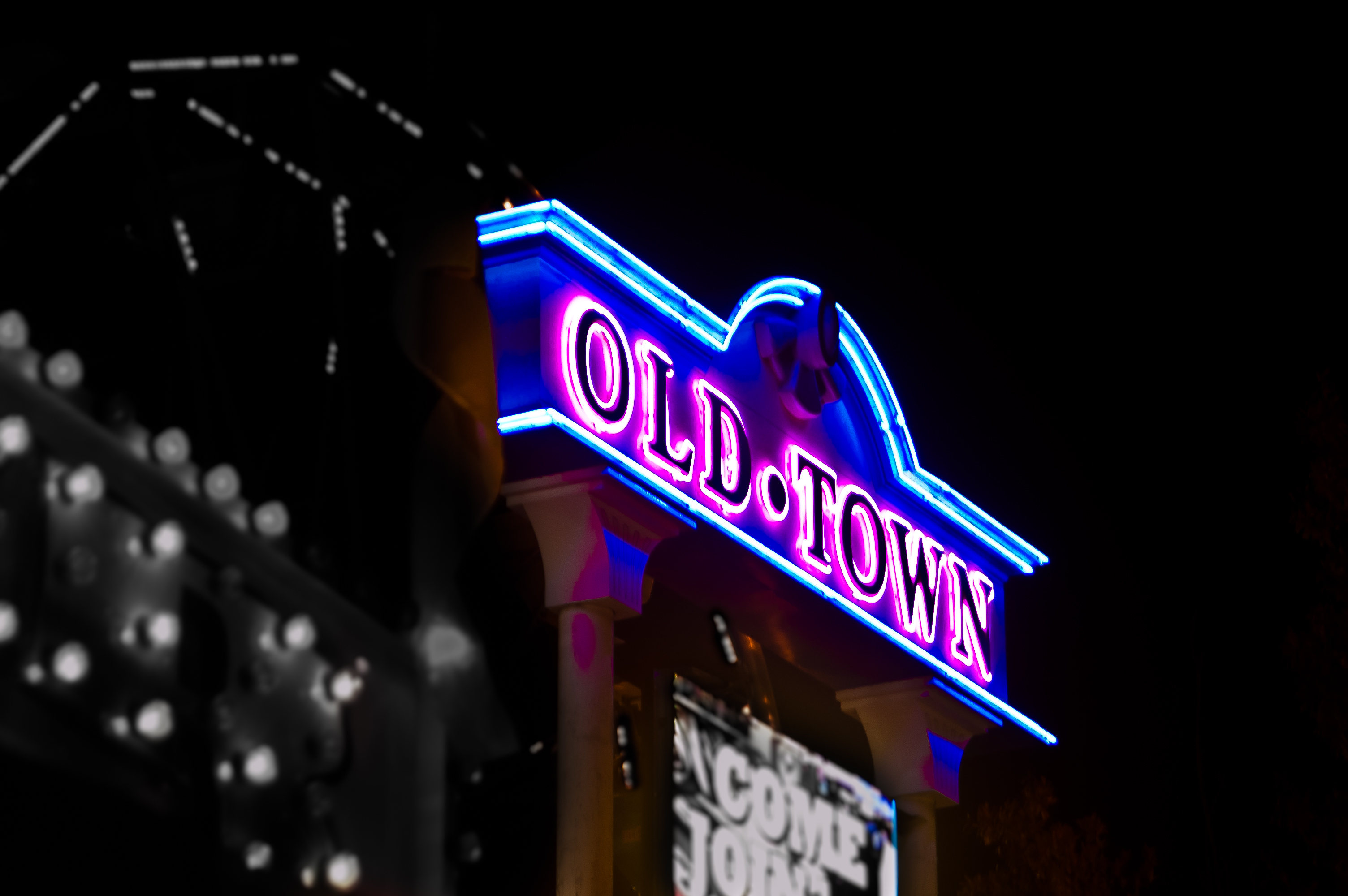

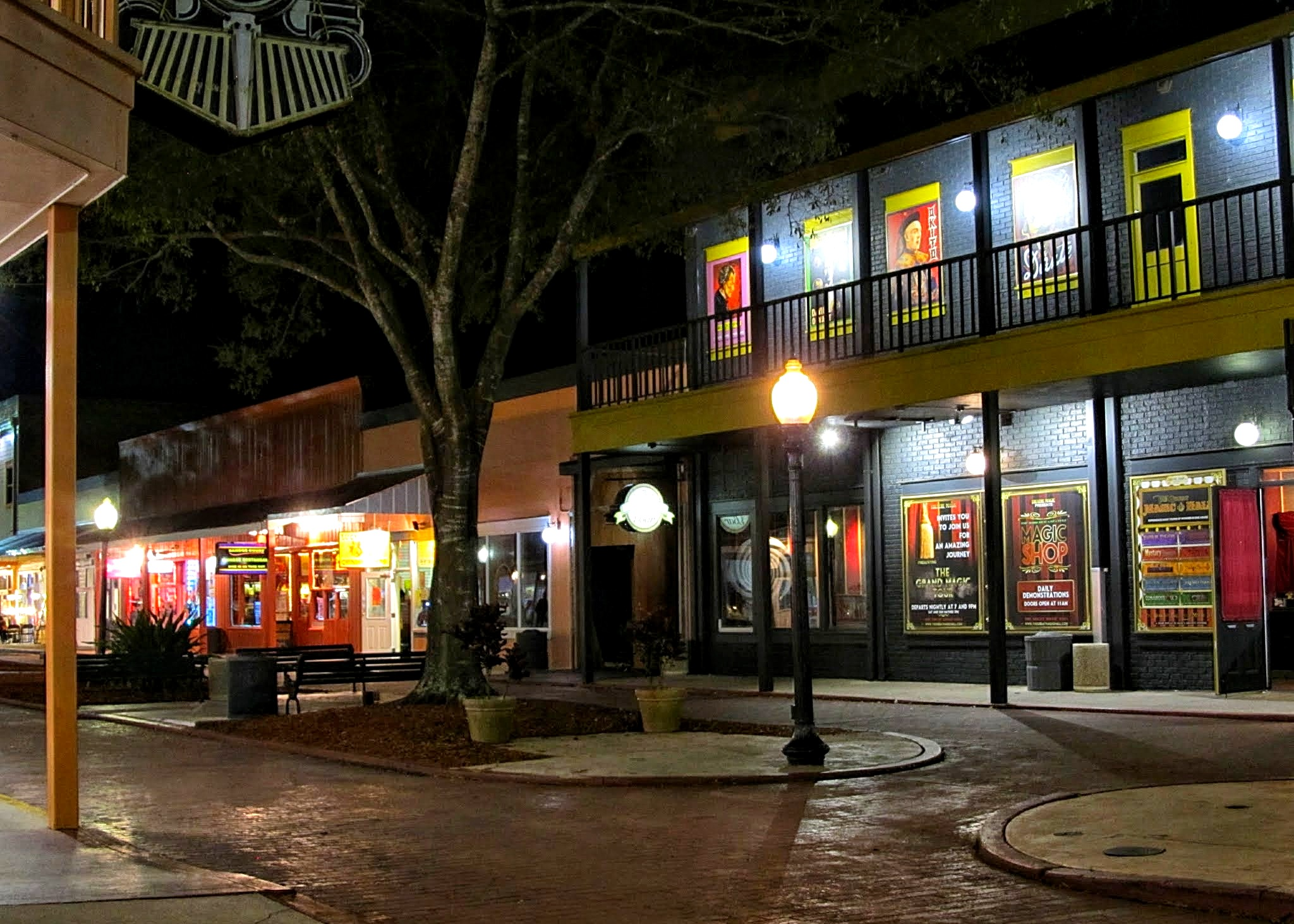

== Attractions ==
1. Carousel
2. Ferris Wheel: 86-foot Ferris wheel imported from Italy, featuring 18 gondolas that seat six each.
3. Happy Days Family Fun Center: Featuring over 50 skills and arcade games.
4. Hurricane: Five-story tall family coaster.
5. Mortem Manor: Mortem Manor has been featured on the Travel Channel as “One of America's Scariest Haunted Attractions”. The haunted house features live actors, state of the art animatronics and special effects.
6. Paratrooper
7. Rootin & Tootin's Shootin’ Alley
8. The Great Magic Hall
