= List of National Natural Landmarks in Colorado =

Colorado National Natural Landmarks (clickable map)

There are 17 National Natural Landmarks in U.S. state of Colorado, one of which extends into Wyoming. They cover areas of geological, biological and historical importance, and include lakes, mountains, rock formations and numerous fossil sites. The landmarks are located in 14 of the state's 64 counties. Five counties each contain all or part of two NNLs, while two landmarks are split between two counties. The first two designations, Slumgullion Earthflow and Summit Lake, were made in 1965, while the most recent designation, Glenwood Caverns and Iron Mountain Hot Springs, was made in 2023. Natural Landmarks in Colorado range from 60 to 380,000 acres (24.3 to 153,780.5 ha; 0.1 to 593.8 sq mi) in size. Owners include private individuals and several municipal, state and federal agencies.

The National Natural Landmarks Program is administered by the National Park Service, a branch of the Department of the Interior. The National Park Service determines which properties meet NNL criteria and, after notifying the owners, makes nomination recommendations. The Secretary of the Interior reviews nominations and, based on a set of predetermined criteria, makes a decision on NNL designation or a determination of eligibility for designation. Both public and privately owned properties can be designated as NNLs. Owners may object to the nomination of the property as a NNL. This designation provides indirect, partial protection of the historic integrity of the properties via tax incentives, grants, monitoring of threats, and other means.

== National Natural Landmarks ==
Name	Image	Year	Location	County	Ownership	Description
Big Spring Creek		2012	37°46′00″N 105°37′30″W	Saguache	Federal	Unique spring-fed creek fed by an unconfined aquifer, creating a rare animal- and plant-supporting wetlands in a generally arid area. Part of Great Sand Dunes National Park and Preserve.
Garden of the Gods		1971	38°52′04″N 104°53′28″W	El Paso	Municipal	The site showcases the lithologic character of sedimentary rocks, as well as providing a habitat for North American honey ants and excellent viewing opportunities for several bird species.
Garden Park Fossil Area	Felch Quarry	1973	38°32′06″N 105°13′18″W	Fremont	Federal	Internationally recognized paleontological site renowned for finds of dinosaur, fish, crocodile, turtle and mammal fossils. Located on Bureau of Land Management land.
Glenwood Caverns and Iron Mountain Hot Springs		2023		Garfield	Private	
Hanging Lake	Hanging Lake	2011	39°36′05″N 107°11′30″W	Garfield	Federal	Travertine deposition-formed lake with substantial hanging garden plant life and minimal human alteration, unique in the region. A part of White River National Forest.
Indian Springs Trace Fossil Site		1979	38°22′03″N 105°29′07″W	Fremont	Private	Best North American location for animal trace fossils from the Ordovician period.
Lost Creek Scenic Area		1966	39°16′07″N 105°28′05″W	Park, Jefferson	Federal	Located in Pike National Forest, with extensive rock formations, including gorges, ridges and spires, and stream channels that meander between above- and under-ground.
Morrison-Golden Fossil Areas		1973	39°40′52″N 105°11′33″W	Jefferson	County, private	Site of major paleontological importance, unique for fossil footprints of reptiles, birds, and mammals. The site was expanded in 2011 to include the 19-acre (7.69 ha; 0.03 sq mi) Parfet Prehistoric Preserve in the city of Golden.
Raton Mesa		1967	37°05′52″N 104°27′46″W	Las Animas	State, private	Protected by a thick lava cap, Raton Mesa has resisted the extensive erosion and weathering that has affected surrounding areas, providing an extreme contrast in geography.
Roxborough State Park		1980	39°25′45″N 105°04′06″W	Douglas	State	Site showcases typical Colorado Front Range sedimentary strata, as well as erosion of Fountain Formation sandstone in unusual patterns, extensive fossil remains and unusual plant populations.
Russell Lakes		1975	37°56′41″N 106°07′12″W	Saguache	Federal, private	Colorado's largest remaining bulrush marsh, now rare in the southern Rocky Mountains. Provides habitat for extensive flora and fauna, especially waterfowl.
Sand Creek		1984	40°59′45″N 105°46′05″W	Larimer	Federal, state, private	Shared with Wyoming, the site is one of North America's most impressive occurrences of cross-bedded sandstone and "topple blocks". Also a site of paleontological and biological significance.
Slumgullion Earthflow		1965	37°59′55″N 107°14′42″W	Hinsdale	Federal, private	A major example of the geologic process of mass wasting, a large flow of volcanic rock traveled from mountainside to valley to form Lake San Cristobal. The same process is occurring again, slowly covering the existing flow. Located on Bureau of Land Management land.
Spanish Peaks		1976	37°22′32″N 104°59′37″W	Huerfano, Las Animas	Federal, private	Located in San Isabel National Forest, the site is an exceptional illustration of over 500 igneous dikes, many exposed, formed when molten igneous rock is forced into a fault before hardening.
Sulphur Cave and Spring		2021	40°29′01″N 106°50′24″W	Routt	Municipal	Located in the Howelsen Hill Ski Area of Steamboat Springs, the site is a superb example of bacterially-mediated sulfuric acid speleogenesis. The cave contains many uncommon cave features, such as biovermiculations and snottites.
Summit Lake		1965	39°35′54″N 105°38′40″W	Clear Creek	Municipal	At almost 13,000 feet (4,000 m), the site contains an excellent example of alpine tundra in the contiguous US. Some of the plants that survive in this microclimate are usually found only in the Arctic Circle.
West Bijou Site		2016	39°40′52″N 104°44′09″W	Arapahoe	Private	Part of the Plains Conservation Center, the site contains fossil and mineral evidence detailing the Cretaceous–Paleogene boundary, the Earth's most recent mass extinction event.

== See also ==
- List of protected areas of Colorado
- List of National Historic Landmarks in Colorado
- Bibliography of Colorado
- Geography of Colorado
- History of Colorado
- Index of Colorado-related articles
- List of Colorado-related lists
- Outline of Colorado
