= Celebration City =

Former American amusement park

- Previously known as Branson USA
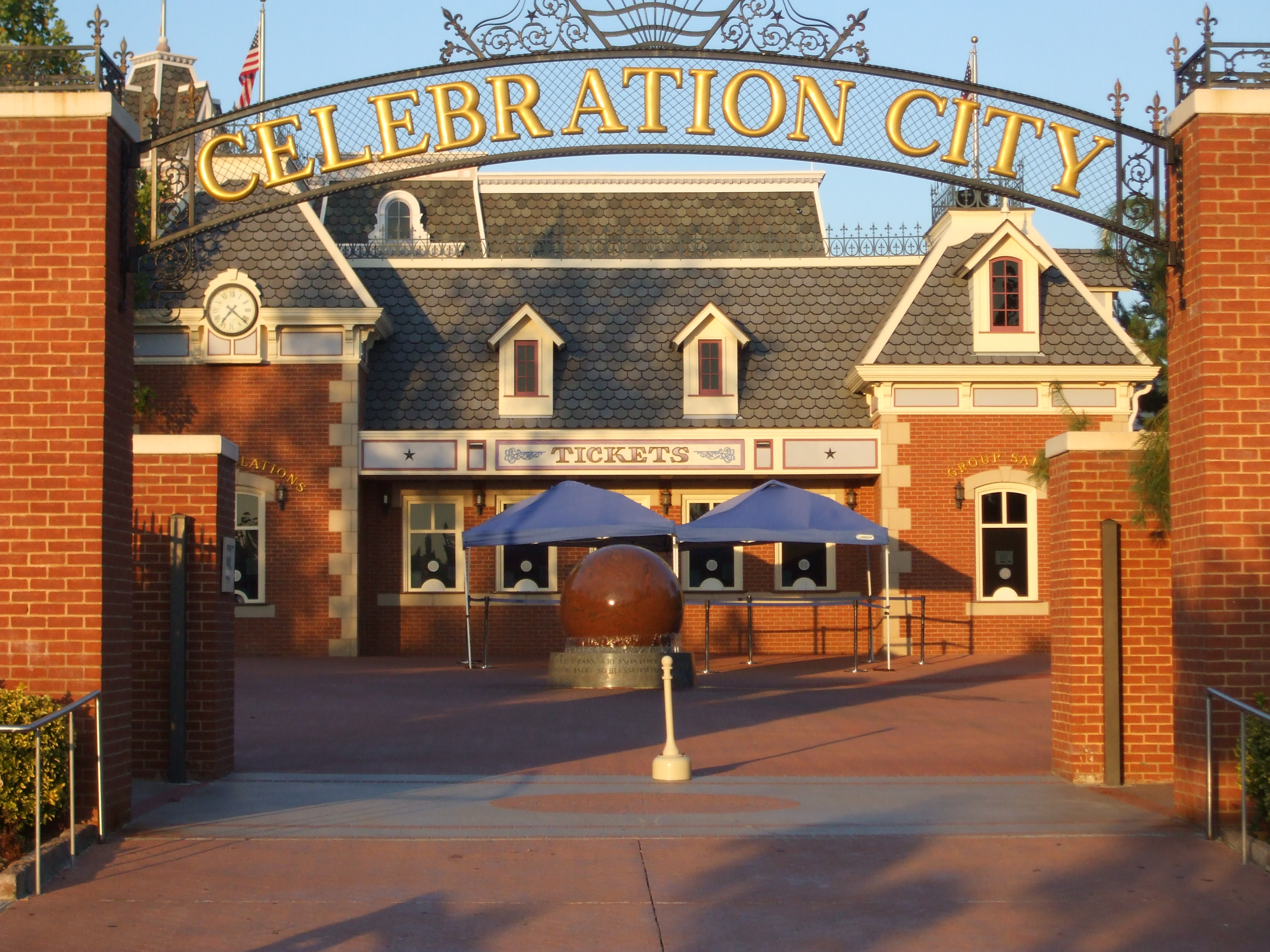
- The main gate in 2007
- Interactive map of Celebration City
- Location: Branson, Missouri, U.S.
- Coordinates: 36.64765°N 93.2959°W
- Status: Defunct
- Opened: May 1999 (27 years ago) (Branson USA); May 1, 2003 (23 years ago) (Celebration City)
- Closed: 2001 (25 years ago) (SBNO until 2003); October 25, 2008 (17 years ago)
- Owner: Herschend Family Entertainment
- Theme: Americana
- Operating season: May until October

Attractions
- Total: 30+
- Roller coasters: 3
- Water rides: 2

Celebration City was a theme park located in Branson, Missouri, United States. It was themed after America in the 20th century, with areas based on Route 66, small-town America in the 1900s, and a beachside boardwalk in the 1920s. As a "sister park" to Herschend's Silver Dollar City theme park located nearby, It was meant to continue the day where Silver Dollar City's 19th century theming left off. It opened in the afternoon into the evening, with the operating day capped off by a laser and fireworks display. The park closed in 2008.

The park featured many rides, shows, and attractions. Its operating season ran from May until mid-September.

== History ==
The property was originally developed as the Mutton Hollow Craft and Entertainment Village, which opened in 1970 and was themed after the 1907 novel The Shepherd of the Hills by Harold Bell Wright. As tourism in Branson grew, the attraction was expanded in 1992 and 1996 to add music venues and carnival rides. These changes failed to attract visitors, and the attraction filed for bankruptcy in 1997. The property was foreclosed upon and purchased by Bob Wehr, the founder of Aaron's Automotive Products.

An amusement park named Branson USA was opened on the site in 1999. It struggled in its early years and closed in 2001. Silver Dollar City Inc. (now Herschend)—owner of Branson's Silver Dollar City amusement park—purchased the property in 2002. After a $40 million redevelopment, it reopened in May 2003 as Celebration City; the park was themed after the United States in the early-20th century to continue on from Silver Dollar City's 19th century theming, including areas themed around boardwalks, 1920s amusement parks, and Route 66. Its flagship attraction was a new wooden roller coaster known as the Ozark Wildcat.

Director of sales Mike Woody suggested that guests would "be able to begin the day in the 19th century at Silver Dollar City and end it in the 20th at Celebration City"; to facilitate this narrative, multi-park passes encompassing Silver Dollar City and Celebration City would be offered, while Celebration City operated from 3 p.m. to around 10 or 11 p.m. nightly. In 2004, Herschend began to lease Celebration City's events hall and theater to the Woodland Hills Church, which conducted services during the daytime hours before the park opened.

On October 24, 2008, amid softened tourism in Branson, Herschend announced that Celebration City would close permanently after the conclusion of its season the following day; a company spokesperson stated that the park "did not meet our financial expectations", citing factors such as its underutilization of the property (only occupying half of its 110-acre plot) and attendance being impacted by its irregular operating hours. It was stated that Herschend was exploring options for the property, including redeveloping the current park, or building new attractions such as an aquarium, or destination retail and restaurants.

The Woodland Hills Church has continued to operate from the Celebration City property, and the closure of the park enabled it to lease additional buildings on the property for offices. The Ozark Wildcat coaster was demolished in December 2015; at that point, Herschend had not yet specified any future plans for the property.

== Rides ==
Since the park closed, some rides have been moved to other locations, and some remain in place. They included:

- Accelerator, an S&S double shot tower relocated from Barefoot Landing, installed by Ride Entertainment Group (which has been moved to Silver Dollar City as Firefall)
- Bumble Bee, a kiddie ride frog hopper
- Chaos, a Chance Rides ride (removed)
- Electric Star Wheel, a Ferris wheel
- Fireball, a swinging claw ride
- Flying Aces, a kiddie ride
- Flying Carpet, a Cliffhanger ride
- Flying Circus, a Larson Flying Scooters ride (which has been moved to Wild Adventures)
- Freefall, a milder version of Accelerator
- Frisco Line, a kiddie train ride
- Jack Rabbit, a steel roller coaster (Built by E&F Miler Industries in 2003 which has been moved to Fun Spot Kissimmee as Hurricane.)
- Orbiter, Flying Carpet ride
- Ozark Wildcat, a GCI wooden roller coaster built in 2003. It was demolished on December 15, 2015.
- Paris Wheel
- Roaring Falls, a Shoot-the-Chutes ride, it opened in 2008 and was relocated from Geauga Lake
- Route 66 Speedway, a large go-kart track
- Scrambler (which has been moved to Wild Adventures)
- Shoot-D-Chute, a log flume
- Stinger, a Wisdom Rides Tornado
- Slick's Slightly Used Cars, bumper cars
- Swing & Twirl
- Thunderbolt, a steel roller coaster (relocated to Glenwood Caverns Adventure Park as Cliffhanger)
- Vintage Carousel, a carousel
