= Ozark Wildcat =

Former rollercoaster in Missouri, USA

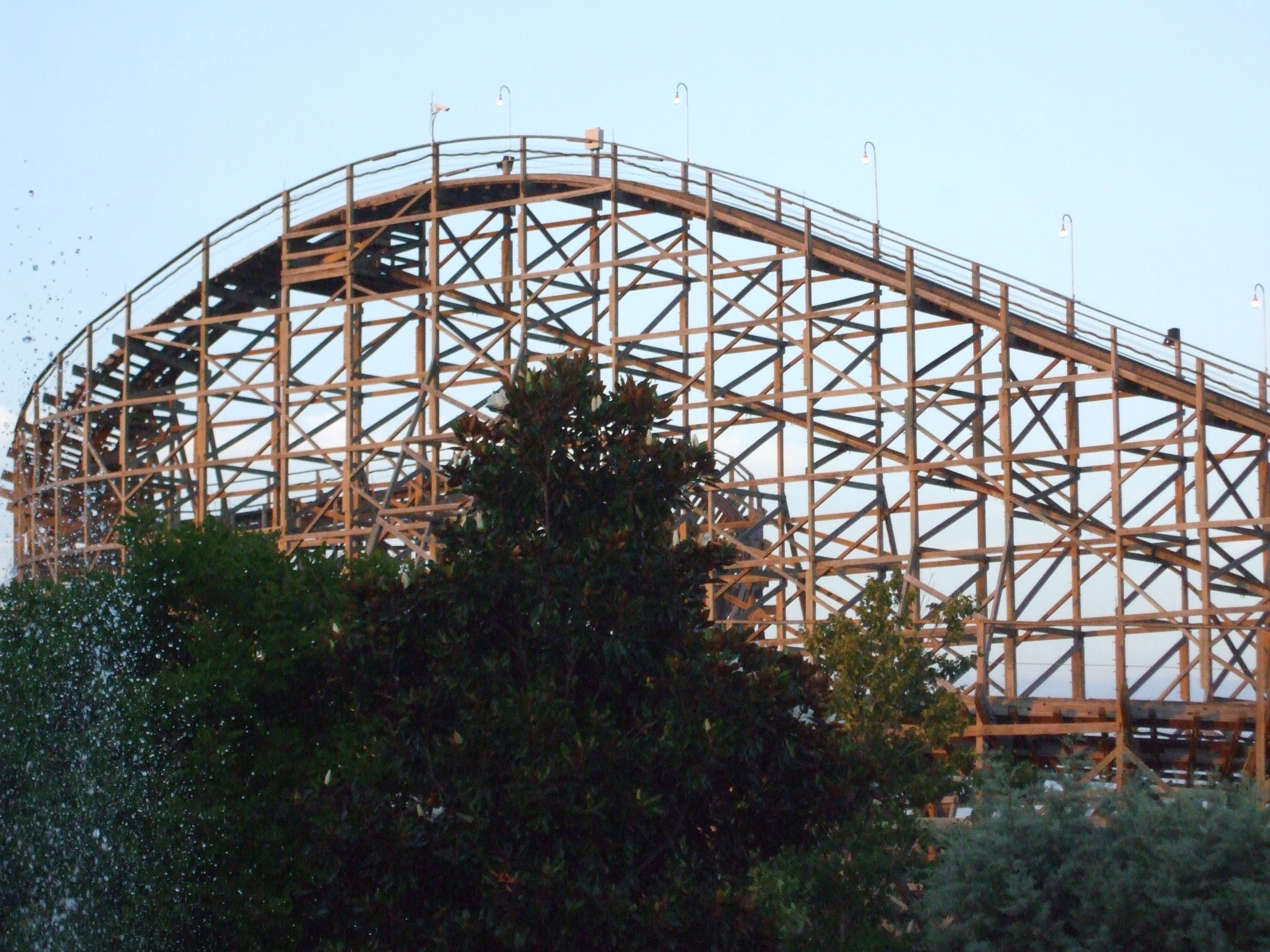

Celebration City
- Location: Celebration City
- Coordinates: 36.650879°N 93.293839°W
- Status: Removed
- Opening date: May 1, 2003
- Closing date: October 25, 2008
- Cost: US$4,000,000

General statistics
- Type: Wood
- Manufacturer: Great Coasters International
- Designer: Mike Boodley
- Height: 80 ft (24 m)
- Drop: 73 ft (22 m)
- Length: 2,613 ft (796 m)
- Speed: 45 mph (72 km/h)
- Inversions: 0
- Duration: 1:30
- Trains: 2 trains with 12 cars. Riders are arranged 2 across in a single row for a total of 24 riders per train.
- Ozark Wildcat at RCDB

Ozark Wildcat was a wooden roller coaster at the now-defunct Celebration City amusement park in Branson, Missouri, United States. Manufactured by Great Coasters International, it opened to the public on May 1, 2003. After six seasons, it permanently closed on October 25, 2008, along with the rest of the park. In October 2015, Herschend Family Entertainment announced that it would be removed. It was demolished on December 15, 2015, and its trains were sent to Dollywood for the Thunderhead roller coaster by the same manufacturer.

== Ride experience ==
After being dispatched form the station, trains made a left turn before climbing the ride's chain lift hill. Trains then turned to the right before dropping into a series of hills and elevated turns. Following a set of smaller hills and a right turn, trains entered the final brake run before making a left turn back into the station.

== Awards ==
Golden Ticket Awards: Top wood Roller Coasters
Year									1998	1999
Ranking									–	–
Year	2000	2001	2002	2003	2004	2005	2006	2007	2008	2009
Ranking	–	–	–	26	21	16	20	18	20	36
Year	2010	2011	2012	2013	2014	2015	2016	2017	2018	2019
Ranking	–	–	–	–	–	–	–	–	–	–
Year	2020	2021	2022	2023	2024	2025				
Ranking	N/A	–	–	–	–	–				
