= Wild Adventures =

Theme park in Clyattville, Georgia, US

- Previously known as Liberty Farms
- Interactive map of Wild Adventures
- Location: Valdosta, Georgia, United States
- Coordinates: 30°43′12″N 83°19′24″W
- Status: Operating
- Opened: 1996
- Owner: Herschend
- General manager: Donald Spiller
- Theme: Zoological
- Slogan: No One Funs Like Us Creating Memories Worth Repeating (Herschend)
- Operating season: Mid-March through December
- Area: 1,566 acres (6.34 km^{2})

Attractions
- Total: 39 (as of 2026)
- Roller coasters: 6
- Water rides: 9
- Website: www.wildadventures.com

Wild Adventures (formerly known as Liberty Farms) is a zoological theme park located in Clyattville, Georgia, 5 miles (8.0 km) south of Valdosta, Georgia. The park is owned by Herschend and has been managed by Donald Spiller since September 2025. Wild Adventures has rides, exotic animals, the Splash Island water park, and an annual live concert series.

== History ==
Kent Buescher and his wife Dawn Buescher founded the park on a plot of farmland outside of Valdosta, Georgia. It was established in 1996 for around $10 million. Wild Adventures started as a small petting zoo known as Liberty Farms D&L (Distribution & Logistics ). The park now hosts six roller coasters and numerous flat rides. Rides were initially added to the park in 1998. Splash Island, the park's water park, opened in 2003 as the park's largest expansion which features a 100-meter drop double slide.

In 2004, the Adventure Park Group purchased Cypress Gardens in Winter Haven, Florida, a company that Buescher privately held. The expansion of the park was slowed down following the purchase of Cypress Gardens. In 2005, an S&S Power Screamin' Swing named Gauntlet was added. For the park's 10th anniversary in 2006, the park announced its intent to add the Shaka Zulu River Adventure log flume, relocated from the defunct Miracle Strip Amusement Park in Panama City Beach, Florida. However, the ride was delayed due to engineering problems and was later canceled.

In September 2006, Adventure Parks Group filed for Chapter 11 bankruptcy protection. On September 25, 2007, due to bankruptcy proceedings, Adventure Parks Group LLC auctioned off Cypress Gardens and Wild Adventures. Despite the Chapter 11 filing, the parks remained open for operation. The initial bids were set at $17.4 million for Cypress Gardens and $38.85 million for Wild Adventures, with a combined starting point of $53.25 million. The group's situation only worsened after hurricanes Charley, Frances, and Jeanne damaged Cypress Gardens in 2004. Herschend later purchased Wild Adventures for $34.4 million.

Herschend removed the Gauntlet but opened The Rattler on March 21, 2008. It is a Huss Frisbee-type flat ride manufactured by Moser Rides of Italy. Also in 2008, the Tiger Terror roller coaster was sold and moved to Lowry Park Zoo in Tampa, Florida, and renamed "Tasmanian Tiger". In February 2009, the movie Zombieland was filmed at Wild Adventures for its theme park scenes.

For the 2010 season, the park added several rides including Viking Voyage, Whirling Wildcats, and Falcon Flyers. All three rides were from the now defunct Celebration City in Branson, Missouri. The Attractions, Gold Rush, and Mystery Maze were removed. Bug Out was renamed Go Bananas. The S&S Double Shot was renamed Firecracker. Two new rides, Tailspin, and Wacky Wheels were added before the 2013 season. In 2015, Jungle Rumble, a flat ride, was also added.

Before the 2019 season, Fiesta Express was moved out of storage and was renamed Swamp-water Snake and the S&S Double-shot was renamed Blazer Blast for a new children-themed area called Discovery Outpost. After the 2019 season, Viking Voyage was moved to Fun Spot Kissimmee. Beginning in the 2020 season, Blackfoot Falls was renovated and renamed Island Falls, and the Pharaoh's Fury was moved to another zone of the park after the closure of surrounding rides. Wild Adventures was shut down due to the COVID-19 pandemic, later reopening in July 2020. In early 2021, it was announced that the park's CCI wooden coaster Cheetah would be retired after its closure in the 2020 season, as well as the park's go-karts and mini-golf course.

For the 2022 season, the Falcon Flyers were renamed the American Flyers and received a new paint job. The restaurant Brews and Bites began selling alcoholic beverages and added covered seating and a live concert area. At the end of the season, the Yo-Yo ride was removed from the park. In 2023, the Go Bananas roller coaster was renamed to Marsh Mayhem, and the Sidewinder flat ride was renamed Sandstorm Chaser and moved to the new Oasis Outpost-themed area of the park.

== Sections ==
In 2019, the park created Discovery Outpost, a new children's section, using old rides that were repainted and renovated to match the theme of the area. Oasis Outpost was added for the 2023 season with two rides being moved to this new section – the Sidewinder was renamed the Sandstorm Chaser and the Trail Trackers. Past themes included Base Camp, Bugsville, Australian Outback, Alapaha Preserve, The Lagoon, African Pride-lands, and Wild West. In 2025, Water's Edge was created - Century Wheel (Ferris Wheel) was renamed to Horizon Wheel and moved to the new area - joining Boat Parade and Wing Swinger.

== Attractions ==
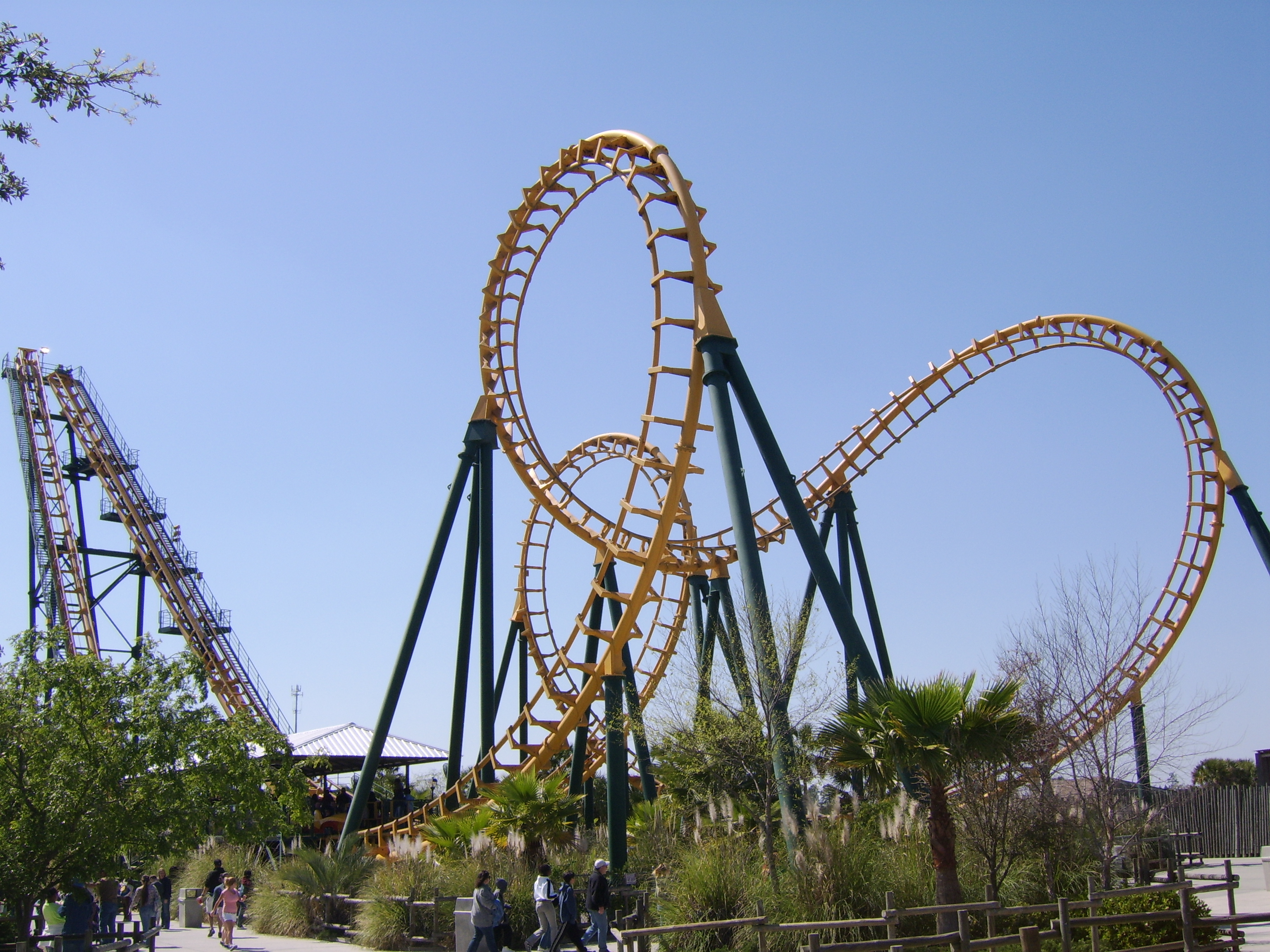
The Boomerang roller coaster

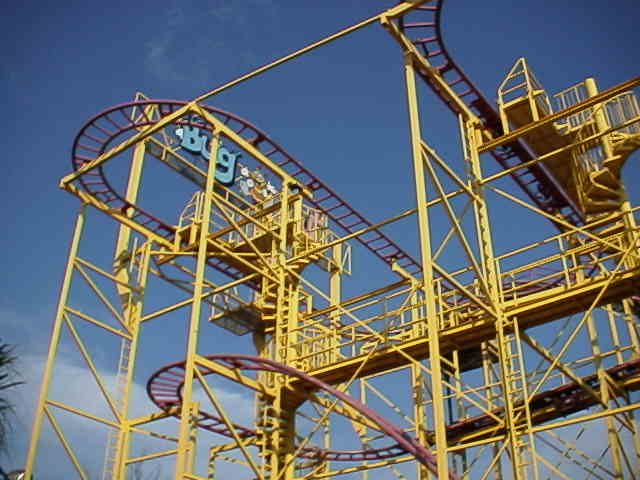
Marsh Mayhem Roller Coaster (Formerly the Go Bananas/Bug Out Coaster)

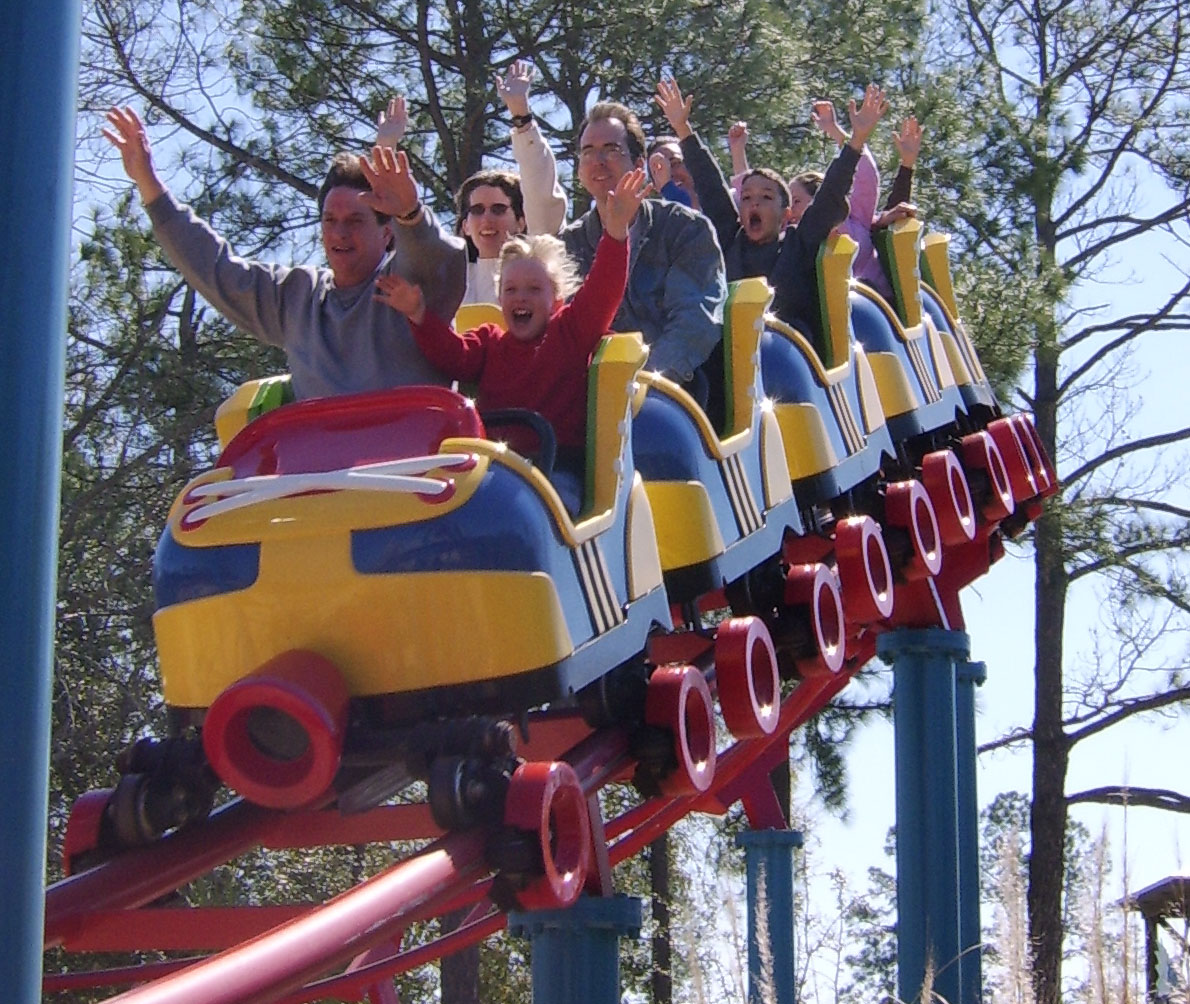
Outpost Express Roller Coaster (Formerly the Ant Farm Express)

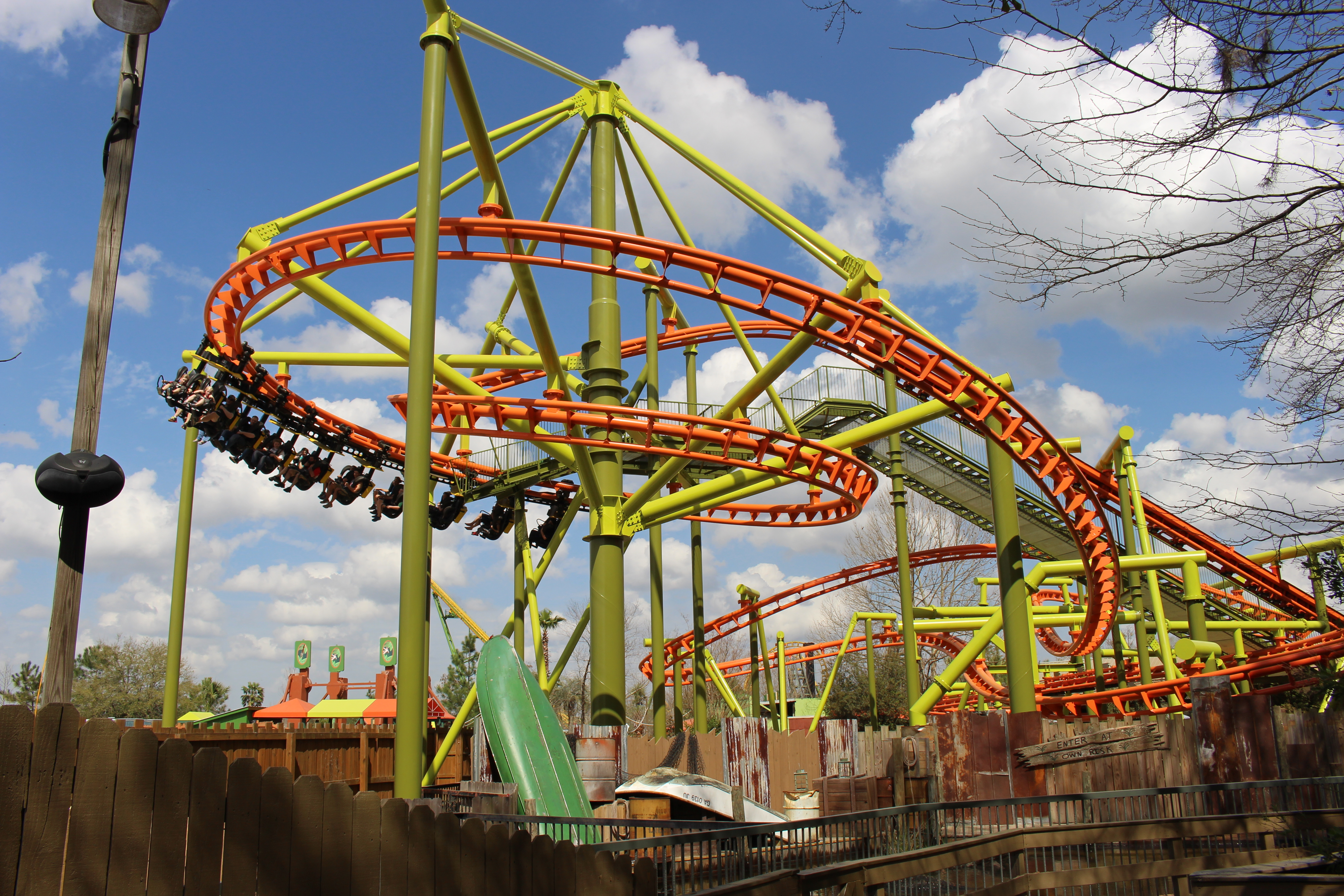
Swamp Thing

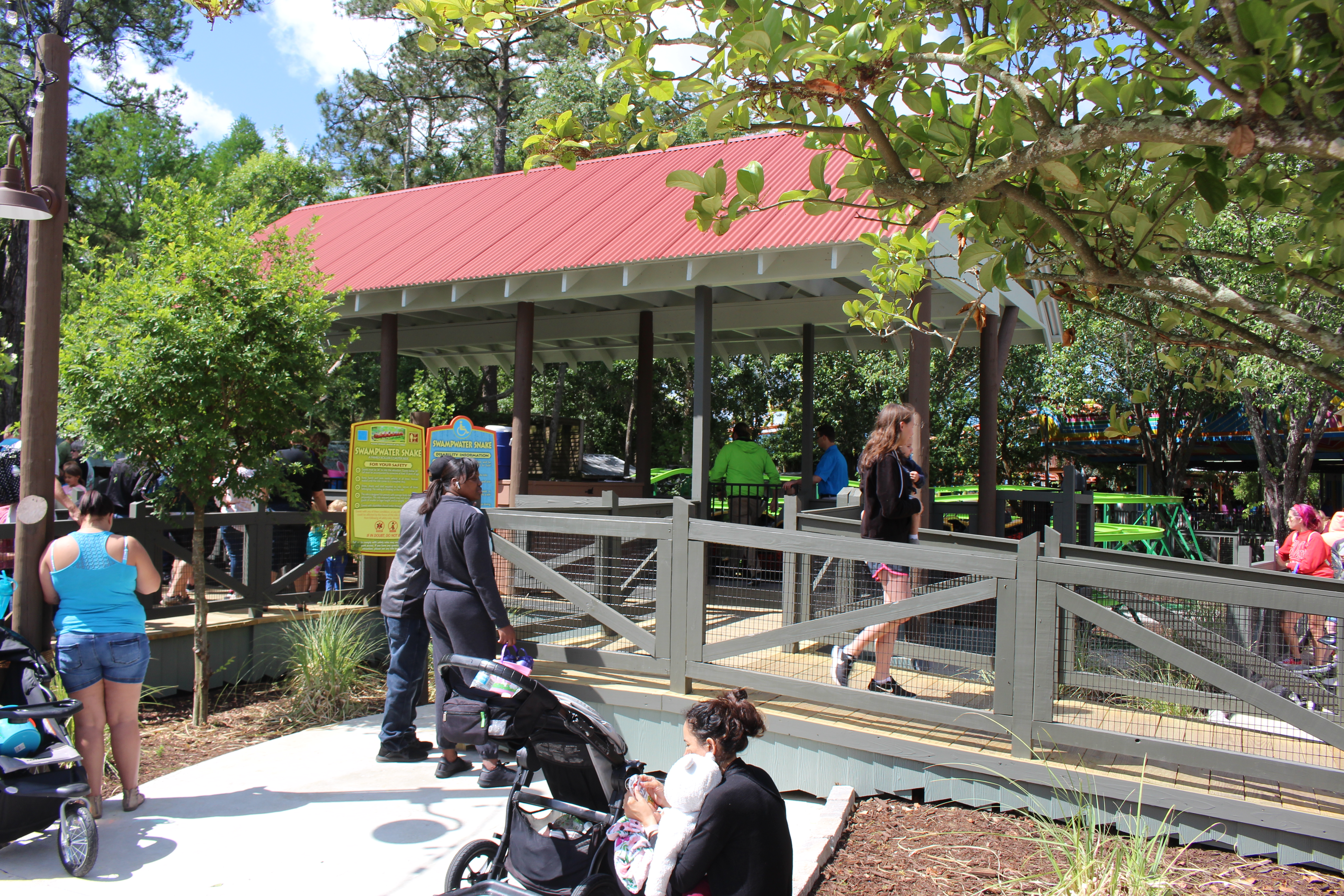
Swampwater Snake (Formerly Fiesta Express)

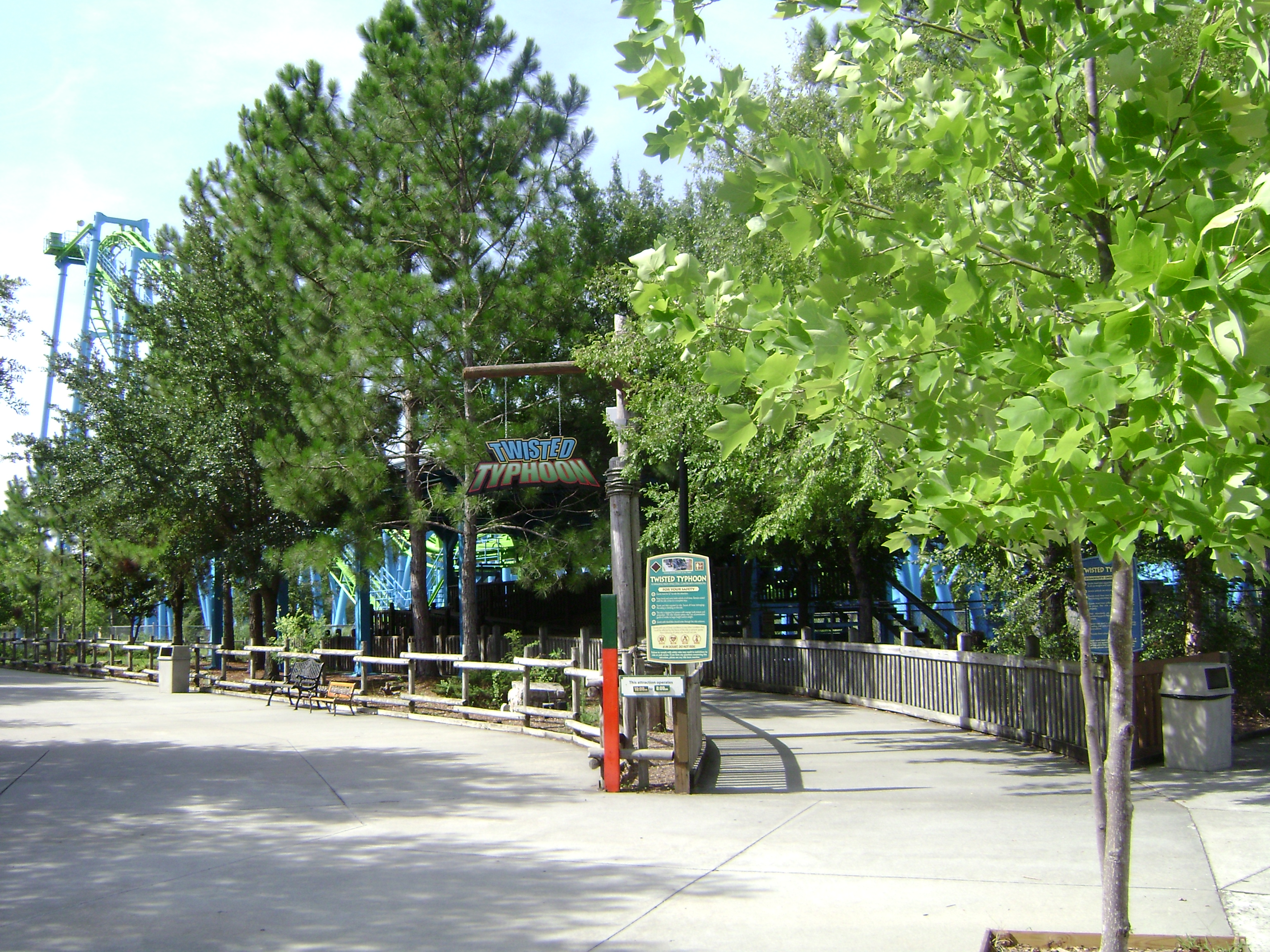
Twisted Typhoon (Formerly The Hangman)

=== Roller coasters ===
Ride	Manufacturer	Year opened	Description
Boomerang	Vekoma	1998	A reverse shuttle coaster that sends you through a Cobra Roll and a Vertical Loop first forward, and then in reverse.
Marsh Mayhem	Maurer Söhne	2000	A steel wild mouse roller coaster, formerly known as Bug Out from 2000 to 2010, and previously known as Go Bananas!
Outpost Express	Vekoma	2000	A family-friendly steel coaster, formerly known as Ant Farm Express up until 2019.
Swampwater Snake	Zamperla	2003/2019	A junior wild mouse-style roller coaster. Formerly known as Fiesta Express from 2003 to 2011. Placed in storage until 2019, added to the Discovery Outpost.
Swamp Thing	Vekoma	2003	A suspended family roller coaster that travels over the park's swamp as well as the park's 15-foot alligator, Twister.
Twisted Typhoon	Vekoma	1999	A Suspended Looping Coaster with five inversions. Formerly known as Hangman from 1999 to 2011.

=== Thrill rides ===
Ride	Photo	Manufacturer	Year opened	Description
Aviator		Chance Rides	2004	A Chance Aviator.
Blast Off		S&S - Sansei Technologies	1999	A Double Shot tower. Renamed to Blast Off (Formerly the Double Shot, Blazer Blast Off and Firecracker).
Rattler		Moser	2008	A Sidewinder ride.
Swingin' Safari		HUSS	1998	A HUSS Himalaya ride.
Tail Spin		Zamperla	2019	A Disk'o coaster.

=== Family rides ===
Ride	Photo	Manufacturer	Year opened	Description
American Flyers		Larson	2009	A Flying Scooter ride, originally installed at Celebration City. Formerly called Falcon Flyer.
Pharaoh's Fury		Chance Rides	2003	A Chance Swinging ship.
Safari Train		Unknown	1996	A narrow gauge C.P. Huntington ridable miniature railroad.
Sandstorm Chaser		Chance Rides	1999	A Trabant ride. Formerly called Sidewinder.
Swamp Buggy Bumper Cars		Bertazzon	1999	A Bumper car ride.
Trail Trackers		Zamperla	2023	convoy
Turtle Twist		Larson	2003	A Tilt-A-Whirl ride.
Wacky Wheels		Zamperla	2013	Tea Cup Ride.
Whirling Wildcats		Eli Bridge Company	2009	A Scrambler ride, originally installed at Celebration City.

=== Water rides ===
Ride	Manufacturer	Year opened	Description
Island Falls	Hopkins Rides	1999	A shoot the chute ride.
Tasmanian River Rapids	HAFEMA Water Rides	2000	River Rapid Ride.

=== Discovery Outpost ===
Ride	Manufacturer	Year opened	Description
Crunch's Caboose	Zamperla	2008	A children's train ride.
Flying Gators	Sellner Manufacturing	1996	A tea cup-style ride with alligator-shaped cars.
Hoppin' Gators	S&S - Sansei Technologies	1998	A tame drop tower.
Okefenokee Friends	Zamperla	2002	A jump-around ride.
Swampwater Snake	Zamperla	2003/2019	A junior wild mouse-style roller coaster. Formerly known as Fiesta Express from 2003 to 2011. Placed in storage until 2019, added to the Discovery Outpost.
Turtle Race	Zamperla	1999	A children's spinning ride.

=== Oasis Outpost ===
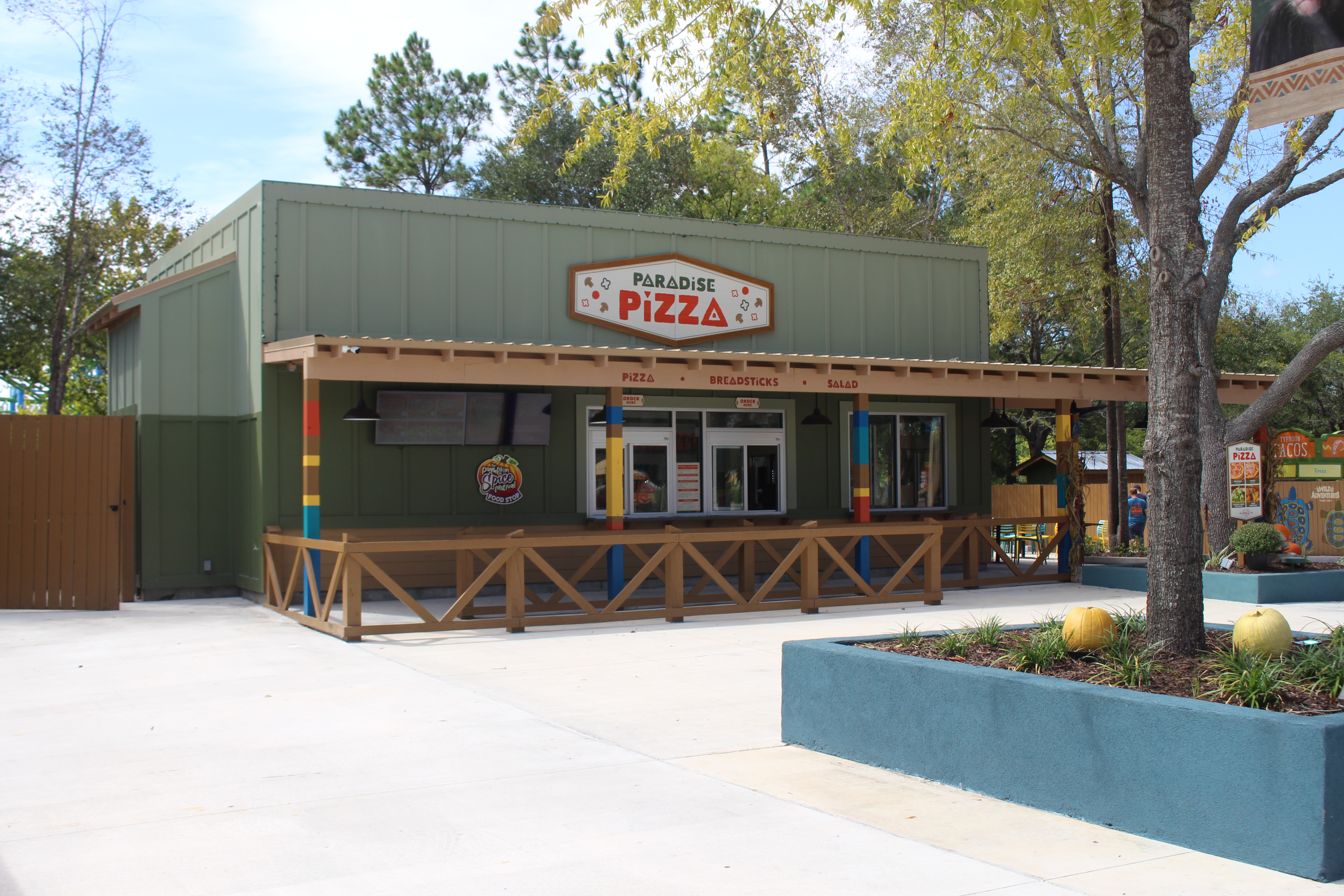
A pizzeria in Oasis Outpost - new for 2023.

Ride	Photo	Manufacturer	Year opened	Description
Sandstorm Chaser			2023	Circular ride featuring a 40-degree tilt.
Trail Trackers			2023	A children's jeep-style ride.

=== Waters Edge ===
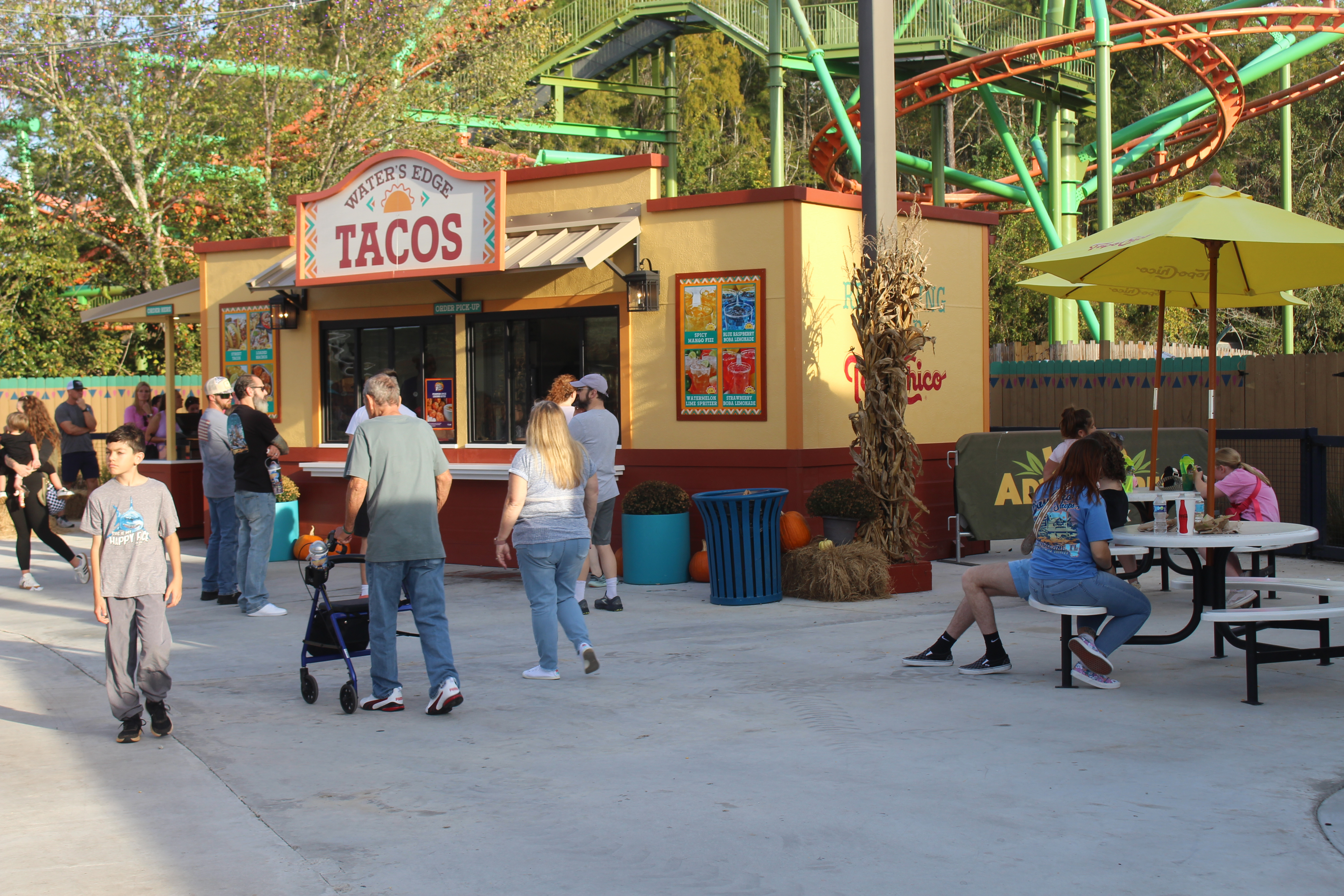
A Mexican eatery in Water's Edge - new for 2025.

Ride	Photo	Manufacturer	Year opened	Description
Horizon Wheel		Chance Rides	1996	A Ferris Wheel. Formerly called Century Wheel
The Boat Parade		Zamperla	2025	
Wing Swinger		Zamperla	2025	A Wave Swinger.

== Splash Island Water Park ==
Splash Island is a Polynesian-themed water park that is free with admission to Wild Adventures. It takes up 27 acres (110,000 m^{2}) of the 166-acre (670,000 m^{2}) park and hosts seven rides and five shops. It is frequently the most crowded area of the park. Splash Island first opened in 2003 and was Wild Adventures' largest expansion since rides were introduced in 1999.

When Splash Island was opened, it had no theming and more closely resembled a community pool. In 2008, Wild Adventures announced that Splash Island would undergo a $4 million renovation to turn the park into a Polynesian-themed paradise. Wild Adventures also announced their intent to build a new ride, the Wahee Cyclone.

=== Rides ===
- Bonzai Pipelines

3 Inter-twined slides featuring the tallest slides in Georgia built in 2004

- Catch-a-wave bay

A large 25,000-square-foot (2,300 m^{2}) wave pool built in 2003

- Hakini Rapids

A 5-story "Family Sized" water slide with unexpected turns and drops built in 2011

- Kalani Blasters

2 Medium sized intertwined slides built in 2003

- Kona Cliffs

A giant family sized speed slide with three drops built in 2011

- Paradise River

A relaxing lazy river ride through the water park built in 2003

- Polynesian Adventure

A 4-story water fortress built in 2003

- Wahee Cyclone

A 5-story water tornado built in 2009

- Sea Turtle Cove

A small water play area for younger children built in 2006

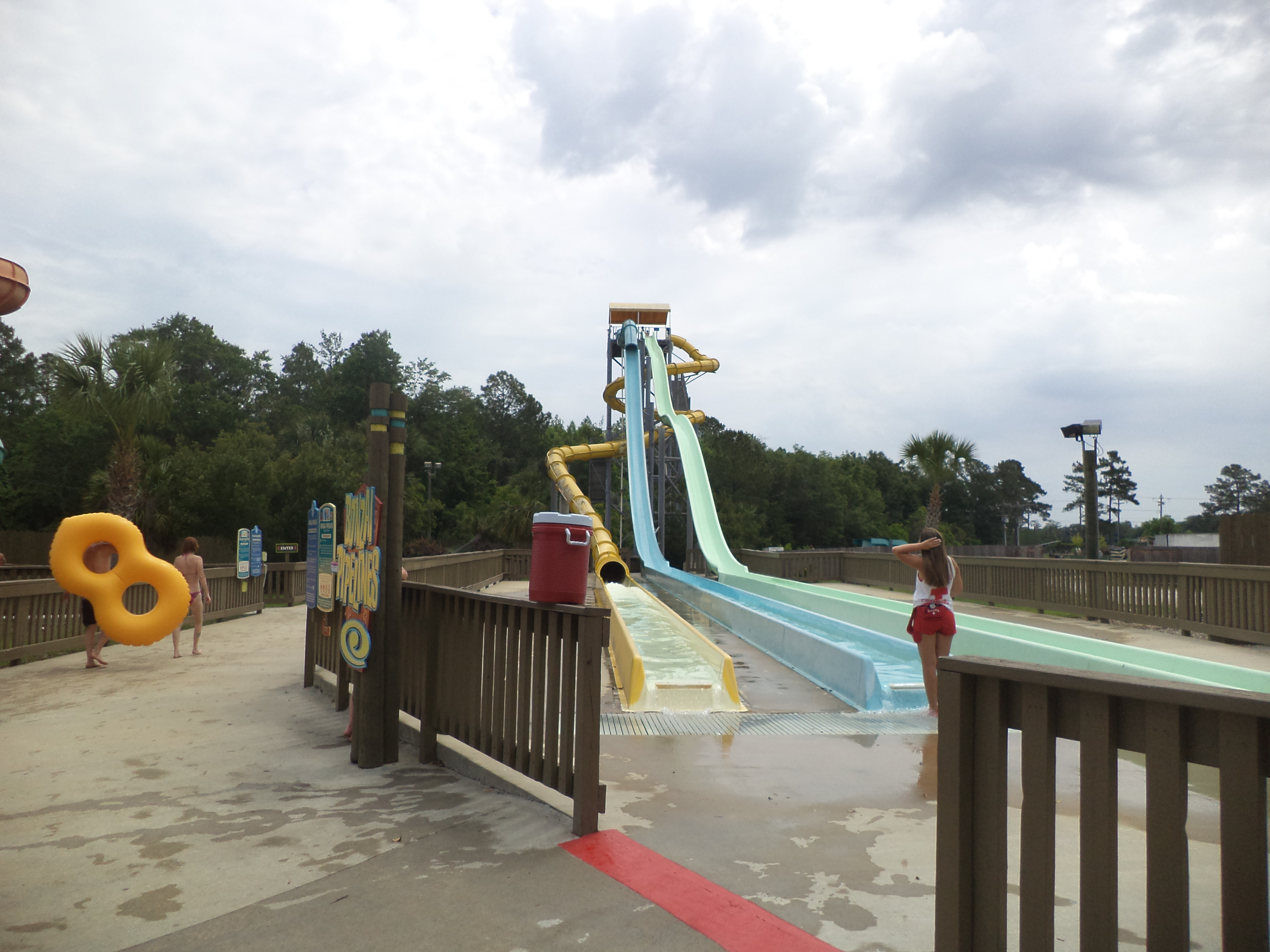
Bonzai Pipelines

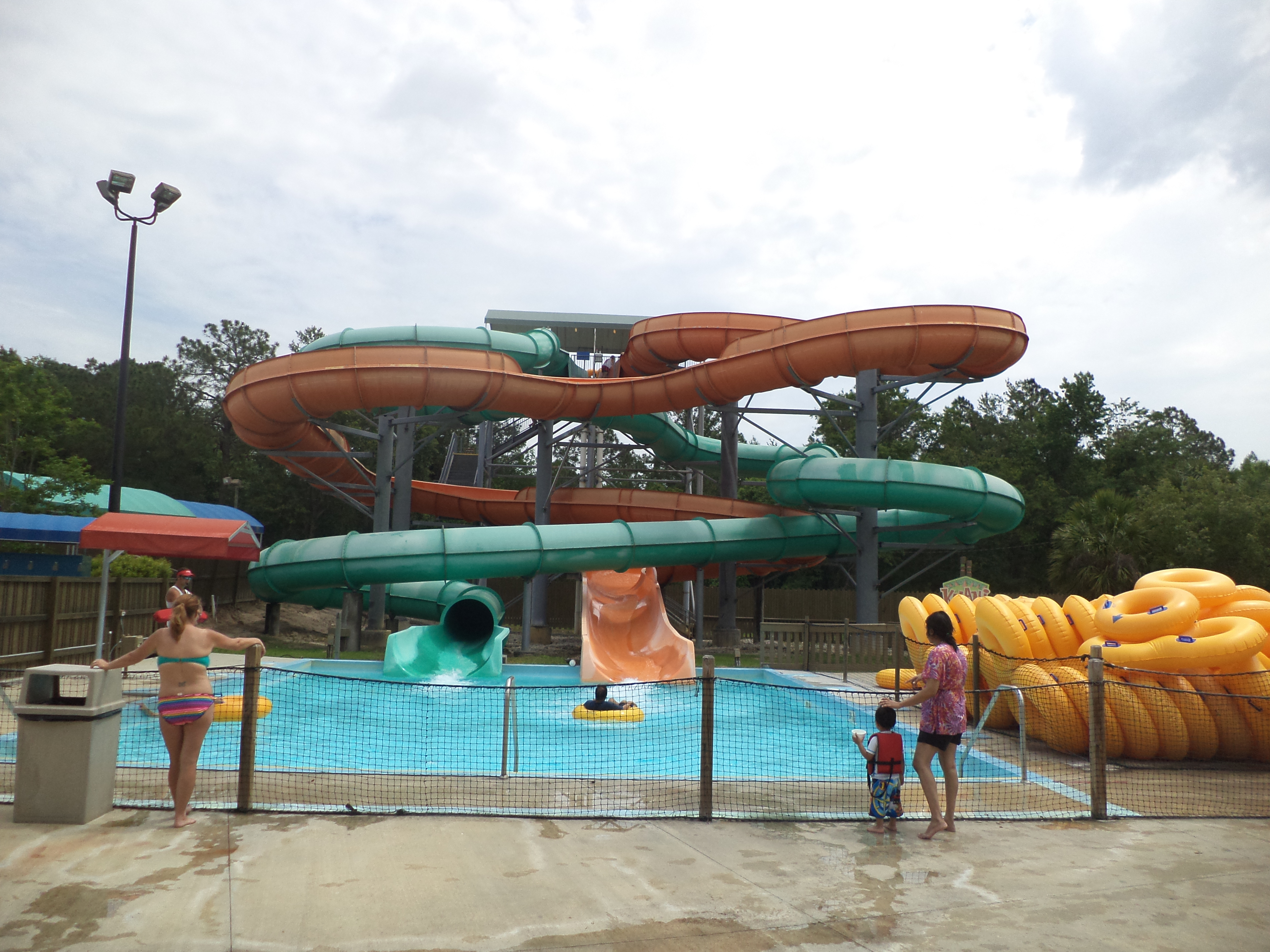
Kalani Blasters

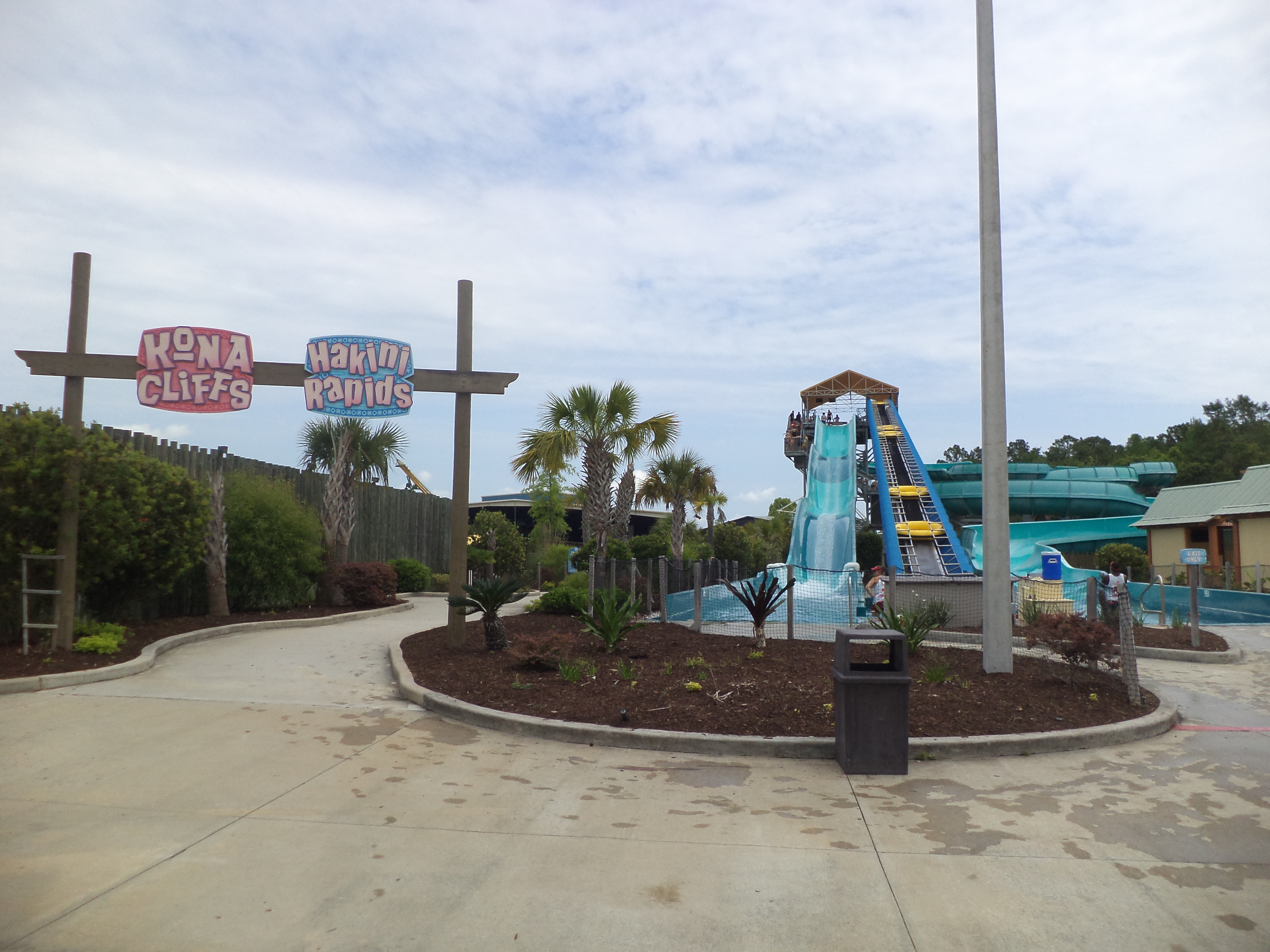
Kona Cliffs and Hakini Rapids

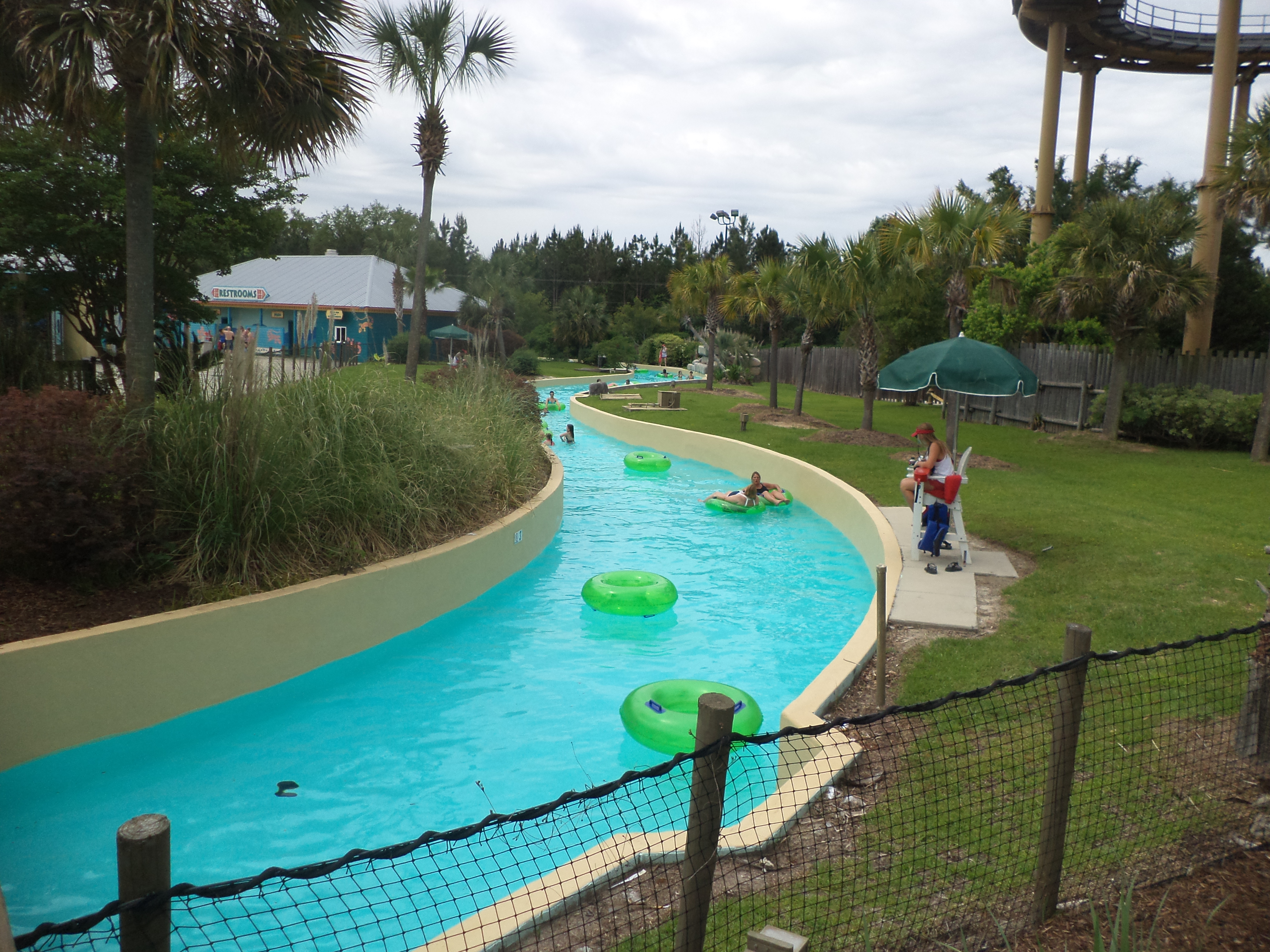
Paradise River

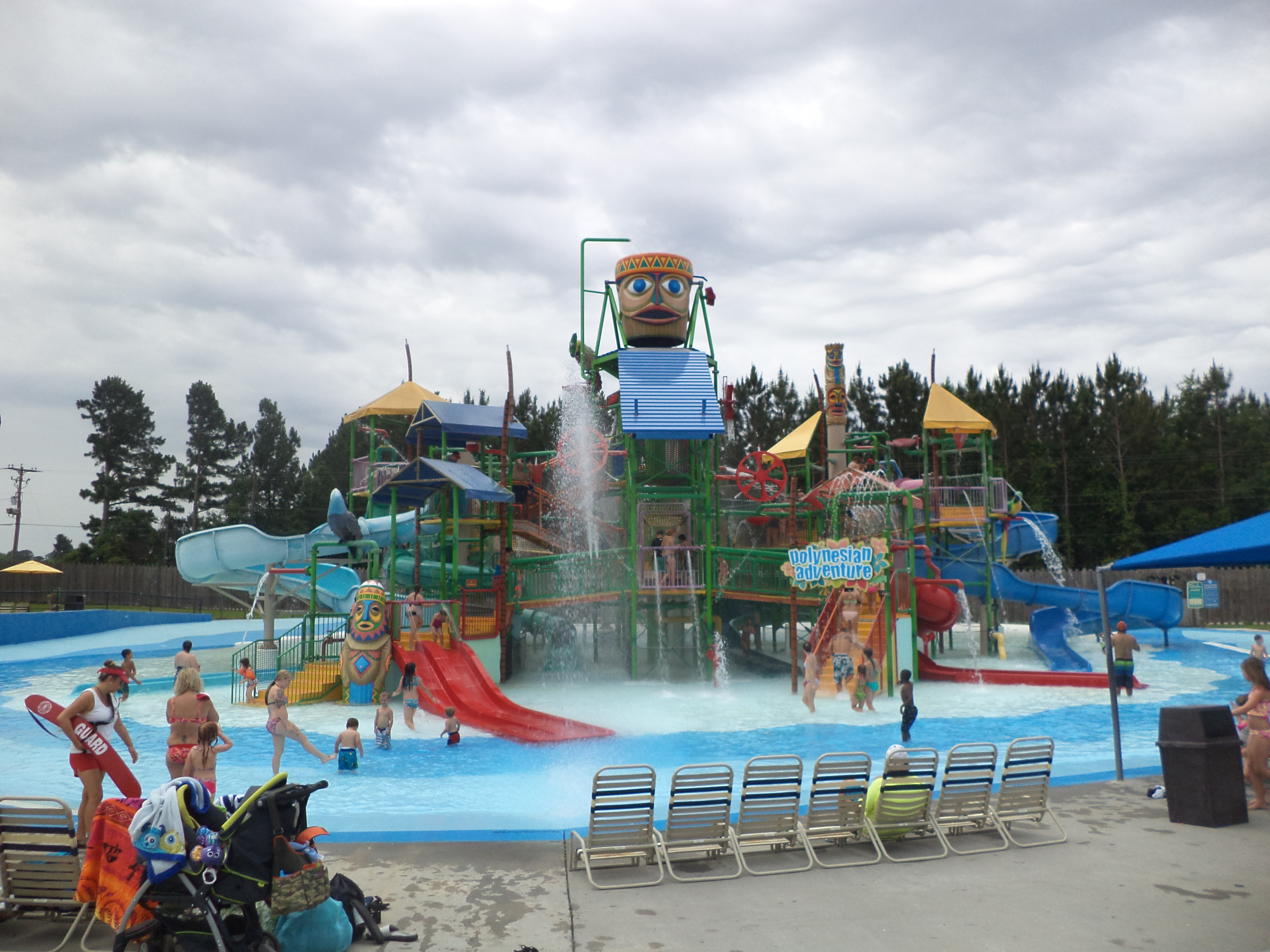
Polynesian Adventure

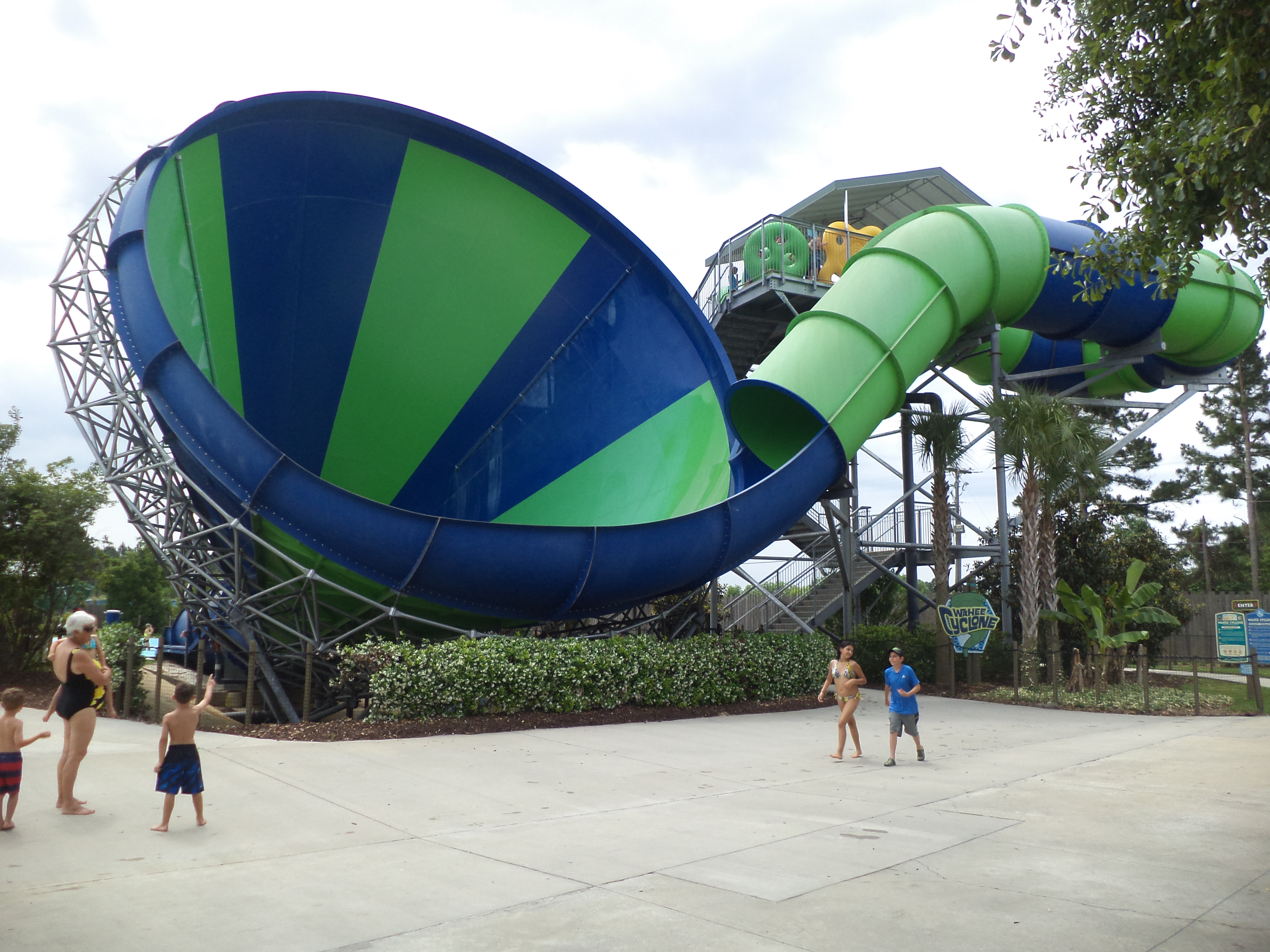
Wahee Cyclone

== Former rides ==
Ride	Year opened	Year closed	Manufacturer	Description
Chaos	1998	2009	Chance Rides	A Chaos flat ride.
Cheetah	2001	2020	Custom Coasters International	A custom, wooden roller coaster with steel supports (except for the figure eight which was rebuilt with wood when the entire coaster was retracted by Great Coasters International in 2010). It was also the largest roller coaster at the park. It last operated in March 2020 and stood idle for the 2020 season; in January 2021 the park confirmed its retirement.
Gauntlet	2005	2007	S&S – Sansei Technologies	A Screamin' Swing with two arms that sat four riders each. Following Herschend's acquisition of the park, the attraction was removed and sold to Fun Spot America.
Gold Rush	1999	2009	Chance Rides	A "Big Dipper" kiddy coaster located near Safari Train. It was removed following the 2009 season and replaced in 2010 with the Whirling Wildcats Scrambler from Celebration City.
Mystery Maze	1999	2009	—N/a	A Maze attraction located near Safari Train. It was dismantled and replaced in 2010 by Viking Voyage from Celebration City.
Shaka Zula River Adventure	—N/a	—N/a	Arrow Dynamics or Hopkins Rides	Purchased from the defunct Miracle Strip Amusement Park after it closed in 2004. Wild Adventures touted plans to refurbish and build it for their 10th anniversary in 2006, but it never came to fruition. Following Herschend's acquisition of the park, plans to install the ride were scrapped from the agenda.
The Inverter	1999	2009	Chance Rides	An Inverter flat ride, located near Safari Train.
Tiger Terror	1998	2008	Wisdom Rides	A ride for children with a single helix and a tiger-themed train. The coaster was sold to ZooTampa at Lowry Park, where it received a refurbishment and opened in December 2008.
Viking Voyage	2010	2018	E&F Miler Industries	A steel family coaster that operated at Celebration City from 2003 up until the park's closure in 2008, where it was then sold to Wild Adventures. Following a repaint from red to blue track during the 2016-2017 offseason, the coaster was closed in 2018 and sold to Fun Spot America Theme Parks, where after a brief storage time at their Atlanta location, it was set up and opened at Fun Spot America Kissimmee in December 2019 as Hurricane.
Power Surge	—N/a	—N/a	Zamperla	Six fixed arms are connected in an asterisk pattern, with two sets of two seats attached at right angles to the arms. The arm assembly is connected to a main arm. Twenty-four riders at a time can be loaded onto the ride. Riders are restrained by an over-the-shoulder harness, with their legs dangling free for excitement.
The Plunge	1998/1999	2006	WhiteWater West	A pair of dinghy slides situated in the dry park, where the boats were delivered to the top of the starting tower via a conveyor belt. Removed following the 2006 season to accommodate the concert venue building.
Yo-Yo	1996	2022	Chance Rides	A swing ride.
Jungle Rumble	2015		Zierer	An Aladdin's Ride-type attraction.
Kite Flyer	2005	2025	Zamperla	A Kite Flyer ride.
