= Cheetah (Wild Adventures) =

Former roller coaster at Wild Adventures

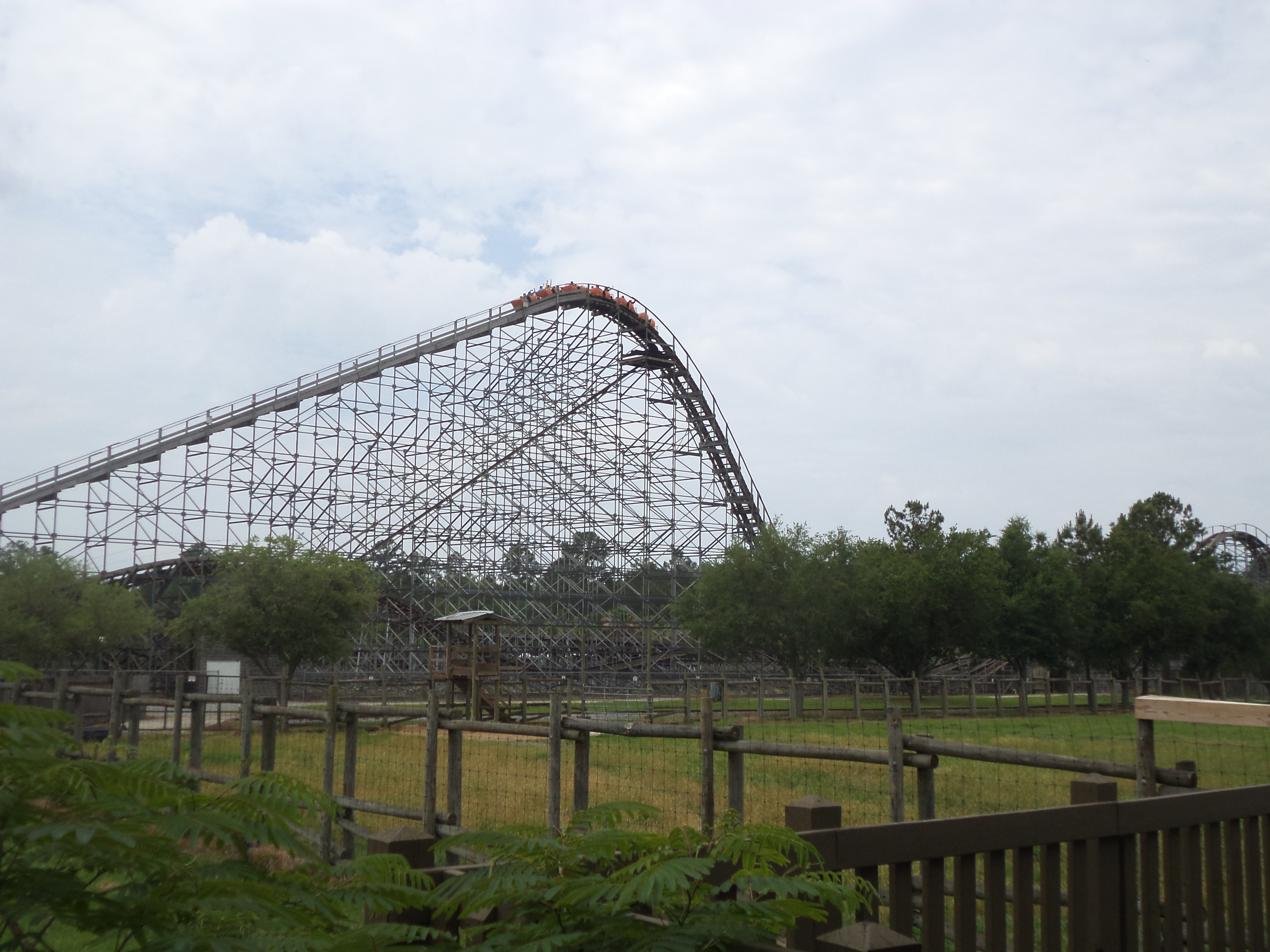
- Cheetah (roller coaster)

Wild Adventures
- Location: Wild Adventures
- Coordinates: 30.719592°N 83.325681°W
- Status: Removed
- Opening date: June 16, 2001
- Closing date: March 15, 2020

General statistics
- Type: Wood
- Manufacturer: Custom Coasters International
- Track layout: Out and back
- Lift/launch system: Chain lift hill
- Height: 92 ft (28 m)
- Drop: 90 ft (27 m)
- Length: 2,680 ft (820 m)
- Speed: 52 mph (84 km/h)
- Trains: 2 trains with 6 cars. Riders are arranged 2 across in 2 rows for a total of 24 riders per train.
- Cheetah at RCDB

Cheetah was a hybrid wooden roller coaster at the Wild Adventures amusement park, in Valdosta, Georgia. Located in the African Pridelands section of the park, it opened in 2001 and was built by Custom Coasters International. Its trains were built by Gerstlauer.

The coaster was named after the cheetah, the fastest land animal. Cheetah was the largest roller coaster at Wild Adventures. Following the 2009 season, Cheetah was subject to a $1.3 million renovation headed by Martin & Vleminckx, replacing track on the figure-eight section and smoothing out other sections.

In March 2020, Cheetah closed along with the rest of the park due to the COVID-19 pandemic. In June 2020, the park reopened without Cheetah operating, Wild Adventures citing being unable to achieve "adequate physical distancing" on the ride. In January 2021, the park stated "The Cheetah roller coaster has been retired to make room for new and exciting changes in the coming years."

== Ride experience ==
Cheetah began with a 95-foot (29 m)-tall drop into a 20-foot (6.1 m) airtime hill, followed by a larger 55-foot (17 m) hill. It continued into a 35-degree decline, entering a helix. Exiting the helix, the return journey followed a 62-foot (19 m) drop and two more 35-foot (11 m) airtime hills. These led into a right-turning helix, before ending with a figure eight into the brake run.
