= Cliffhanger (Colorado roller coaster) =

Roller coaster

- Previously known as Thunderbolt (2003–2008); Firestorm (1999–2002)

Glenwood Caverns Adventure Park
- Coordinates: 39.5602°N 107.3188°W
- Status: Operating
- Opening date: June 15, 2012
- Cost: $800,000 (USD)
- Cliffhanger at Glenwood Caverns Adventure Park at RCDB

Celebration City
- Name: Thunderbolt
- Coordinates: 36.6506°N 93.2956°W
- Status: Removed
- Opening date: 1999
- Closing date: October 25, 2008
- Thunderbolt at Celebration City at RCDB

General statistics
- Type: Steel
- Manufacturer: S&MC
- Model: Hurricane
- Height: 56 ft (17 m)
- Speed: 34 mph (55 km/h)
- Inversions: 0
- Duration: 1:20
- Height restriction: 48 in (122 cm)

Cliffhanger is a steel roller coaster at Glenwood Caverns Adventure Park in Glenwood Springs, Colorado. Originally located at Celebration City in Branson, Missouri, the ride was moved to its present location in 2012. It officially reopened on June 15, 2012.

== History ==
=== Celebration City (1999–2008) ===
The roller coaster opened in 1999 as Firestorm at Celebration City in Branson, Missouri. After the 2001 season, Firestorm went into storage briefly before being reassembled and renamed Thunderbolt. It reopened in 2003. The ride was closed on October 25, 2008, due to financial reasons –Herschend Family Entertainment Corporation announced they were closing the park – and was later put up for sale.

=== Glenwood Caverns Adventure Park (2012–present) ===
Competing against Elitch Gardens in Denver and Six Flags Darien Lake in Buffalo, Glenwood Caverns Adventure Park secured the winning bid to purchase Thunderbolt for $375,000. The cost to refurbish and ship the roller coaster was estimated at $425,000. An estimated 1,400 bolts were used during reconstruction of which 700 were special 14-inch (360 mm) bolts for holding sections of track together. On February 20, 2012, park administration went before the Garfield Board of County Commissioners to discuss plans of adding several new attractions. They announced on February 29, 2012, that Cliffhanger would be among the new attractions and would open in late spring 2012.

Cliffhanger opened on June 15, 2012, and became the highest-elevation roller coaster in the U.S., sitting 7,160 feet (2,180 m) above sea level on Iron Mountain. The coaster is situated on a hillside overlooking Glenwood Canyon with views of the Colorado River more than 1,400 feet (430 m) below.

== See also ==
- 2012 in amusement parks
