= Glenwood Caverns Adventure Park =

U.S. mountaintop adventure park

Coordinates: 39°33′38″N 107°19′13″W

- Previously known as Glenwood Caverns (1999-2002)
- Interactive map of Glenwood Caverns Adventure Park
- Location: Glenwood Springs, Colorado, United States
- Status: Operating
- Opened: 1999
- Owner: Steve and Jeanne Beckley
- Slogan: America's only mountain-top theme park!
- Operating season: Year-round

Attractions
- Total: 10 (as of 2026)
- Roller coasters: 3
- Website: https://www.glenwoodcaverns.com/

Glenwood Caverns Adventure Park is a summer-themed adventure park located near Glenwood Springs, Colorado. It is located approximately 160 miles (260 km) west of Denver at an altitude of 7,132 ft (2,174 m) and is within the Mountain Standard Time Zone (GMT-7).

In December 2023, Secretary of the Interior Deb Haaland designated Glenwood Caverns and Iron Mountain Hot Springs as a national landmark.

== History ==
=== Creation ===
While hiking on Iron Mountain in the late 1800s, Charles W. Darrow followed a whistling sound created by natural air currents and discovered the entrance to a cave system. In 1895, Darrow opened the caves to the public. Originally only accessible by foot or horseback, Darrow installed electric lights in the cave with the help of the city's hydro-electric plant in 1887 (becoming one of the first caves to do so). In 1917, coinciding with the onset of World War I, the caves were closed to the public.

=== New ownership ===
By 1998, Steve and Jeanne Beckley obtained the land on which the cave is located. That year saw the beginning of the Fairy Caves Project, a volunteer organization coordinating caver access as well as science and conservation projects utilizing the land. This project allowed for the reopening of the cave to the public in 1999 after one year of restoration work. The caverns were accessible by bus via a station next to the Hotel Colorado. In 2002, the park was expanded, adding a pulse gondola, a visitor center with a restaurant, an aerial tramway, a sluice box, and a gift shop.

=== Development into Adventure Park ===
As wait time for cave tours increased, attractions were added to the park to provide patrons with entertainment while waiting. From 2005 to 2010, various attractions were added, such as a 4-D theater, an alpine coaster, a zip ride, a swing-style attraction, and a climbing wall. In 2010, the Giant Canyon Swing, a Screamin' Swing ride, was added. Around the same time, the zip ride was relocated, sharing a joint tower structure with a bungee jump.

=== Further expansions ===
In 2012, the park undertook its largest expansion since 2005 with the addition of three rides. These included a Zierer children’s roller coaster and an SBF-Visa Ferris wheel, both relocated from Wild Zone Adventures in Canada. The flagship addition was the Cliffhanger roller coaster, relocated from the former Celebration City amusement park in Branson, Missouri. The coaster opened in June 2012. As of 2026, Cliffhanger is the highest elevation roller coaster in the United States, operating at an elevation of 7,160 feet (2,180 m) above sea level.

==== Cave and tramway improvements (2013) ====
In 2013, the park expanded the upper portion of its cave system. As part of this project, the original cave tour was divided into two separate tours, both being approximately 40 minutes. That same year, the aerial tramway was expanded by adding two additional pulse sequences, bringing the total to six pulses and eighteen cabins.

==== Additional rides (2014–2015) ====
In 2014, the park installed the Glenwood Canyon Flyer as an alternative to the Giant Canyon Swing. The ride was later featured on the television program Thrill Factor in 2015, in the episode "Kari Has No Sense".

==== Haunted Mine Drop / Crystal Tower (2017) ====
In early 2017, the park announced the addition of the Haunted Mine Drop, a drop tower that descends underground and features themed elements as well as a 110-foot (34 m) vertical drop. The ride opened in the summer of 2017. The Haunted Mine Drop was renamed as Crystal Tower in 2023.

== Rides and attractions ==
Rides
Name	Manufacturer	Type of ride	Year opened	Notes
Alpine Coaster	Wiegand	Alpine Coaster	2005	First alpine coaster in the United States. Formerly named Canyon Flyer.
Cliffhanger	S&MC	Windstorm	2012	Highest-elevation full-sized roller coaster in the U.S.A. Windstorm model, relocated from Celebration City.
Defiance	Gerstlauer	Custom Euro-Fighter	2022	
Wild West Express Coaster	Zierer	Small Tivolli	2012	Relocated from Ontario, Canada.
Giant Canyon Swing	S&S	Screamin' Swing	2010	Located about 1,300 feet above Colorado River.
Glenwood Canyon Flyer	SBF/Visa	Tree Swing	2014	Located on edge of Glenwood Canyon between Giant Canyon Swing and Cliffhanger.
Crystal Tower	Soaring Eagle	Daring Drop	2017	First drop tower in world to drop underground. Opened July 31. Originally named "Haunted Mine Drop" until its theme was changed.
Soaring Eagle Zip Ride	Soaring Eagle	Zip Line	2014	Relocated three times. Current boarding area is next to alpine coaster. Features two different lines.
4-D Motion Theater	Simtec Systems	4-D Theater	2009	First 4-D theater in Colorado.
Giddy Up Ride	S&S	Frog Hopper	Unknown	Western themed frog hopper 7 seat model.
Mine Wheel	SBF/Visa	Ferris Wheel	2012	Relocated from Ontario, Canada.
Glenwood Gondola	Leitner-Poma	Gondola lift	2003 (as Iron Mountain Tramway); 2019 (as Glenwood Gondola)	Originally opened in 2003 as a pulse gondola, the first in North America, with six pulses of three cabins. Replaced with a detachable gondola in 2019.

== Incidents ==
=== Civil lawsuit and bankruptcy ===
On the evening of September 5, 2021, 6-year-old Wongel Estifanos died while riding the Haunted Mine Drop attraction after being separated from her seat and falling 110 feet (34 m). Investigators determined that Estifanos had been seated on top of the safety restraint rather than secured beneath it. A forensic pathologist identified the cause of death as blunt-force trauma. An official investigation by the Colorado Division of Oil and Public Safety cited inadequate procedures and insufficient training of two ride operators, who failed to ensure that Estifanos was properly restrained before the ride began. The Estifanos family was represented by attorney Dan Caplis in a subsequent civil lawsuit against the park, which ended in a landmark jury verdict awarding $205 million in damages for the death of Wongel Estifanos. Following the fatal accident in 2021, Glenwood Caverns Adventure Park temporarily closed. The Haunted Mine Drop remained closed until 2023, when it reopened as Crystal Tower.

In 2025, Glenwood Caverns Holding LLC, the park's parent company; Soaring Eagle, the designer of the ride; and the two operators of the ride were found liable for the death of Wongel Estifanos. On February 10, 2026 Glenwood Caverns filed for Chapter 11 bankruptcy on account of the $116 million dollar wrongful death judgement made in 2025. Court filings indicate the park carries roughly $5 million in liability insurance.

=== Ride injuries ===
Several injuries have been reported on the Alpine Coaster attraction. In 2007, a parent and child were hospitalized after being thrown from the ride into a fence. In 2010, a 10-year-old child was ejected from the coaster and landed on a pile of rocks, sustaining facial injuries. In 2011, a woman suffered a broken back after the car she was riding in failed to brake for a series of stalled cars on the track. A lawsuit filed in connection with the incident was later dismissed.

=== Security incident ===
On October 28, 2023, prior to the park opening for the day, a 20-year-old Colorado man identified as Diego Barajas Medina was found dead inside the park from an apparent suicide. Medina was wearing tactical gear and was armed with improvised explosive devices and two privately made firearms, including a semi-automatic rifle and a handgun. Officials with the Garfield County Sheriff's Office stated that the weapons and equipment could have enabled a mass-casualty attack. A note discovered near Medina’s body, written on the wall of a women’s restroom stall, read, "I am not a killer. I just wanted to get into the cave."
