= Mutton Hollow =

Valley in the American state of Missouri

Coordinates: 36°39′49″N 93°18′05″W

Mutton Hollow is a valley in western Taney County, Missouri. Mutton Hollow lies southwest of Missouri Route 76 west of Branson. It drains southwest and joins Fall Creek just east of the Taney-Stone County line. Mutton Hollow is approximately one mile in length. The head of Mutton Hollow is at about 1300 feet in elevation just below Route 76 and the elevation at the confluence with Fall Creek is 912 feet.

Mutton Hollow was named for the fact sheep were kept in the valley.
