= Iron Mountain Hot Springs =

Thermal springs in Colorado

Coordinates: 39.555425°N 107.336197°W

The Iron Mountain Hot Springs is a therapeutic, natural hot springs resort located on the banks of the Colorado River in Glenwood Springs, Colorado.

== History ==
The first commercial use of the hot springs began in 1896 with the opening of the West Glenwood Health Spa. The spa changed ownership several times over the next century, operating under different names. In 1996 the existing spa structure was torn down, and the property remained vacant until 2014 when a new facility was opened in July, 2015.

Iron Mountain Hot Springs contains several natural hot springs, which range in temperature from 105 to 108 degrees F. These springs are fed into seventeen soaking pools, which range from 98 to 108 degrees F. The thermal water also heats the sidewalks and the resort buildings. In November 2020, the owners of Iron Mountain Hot Springs proposed an expansion of the resort, subject to city approval. In December 2023, Interior Secretary Deb Haaland designated Glenwood Caverns and Iron Mountain Hot Springs a National Natural Landmark.
