= Parfet Prehistoric Preserve =

Dinosaur track site in Golden, Colorado

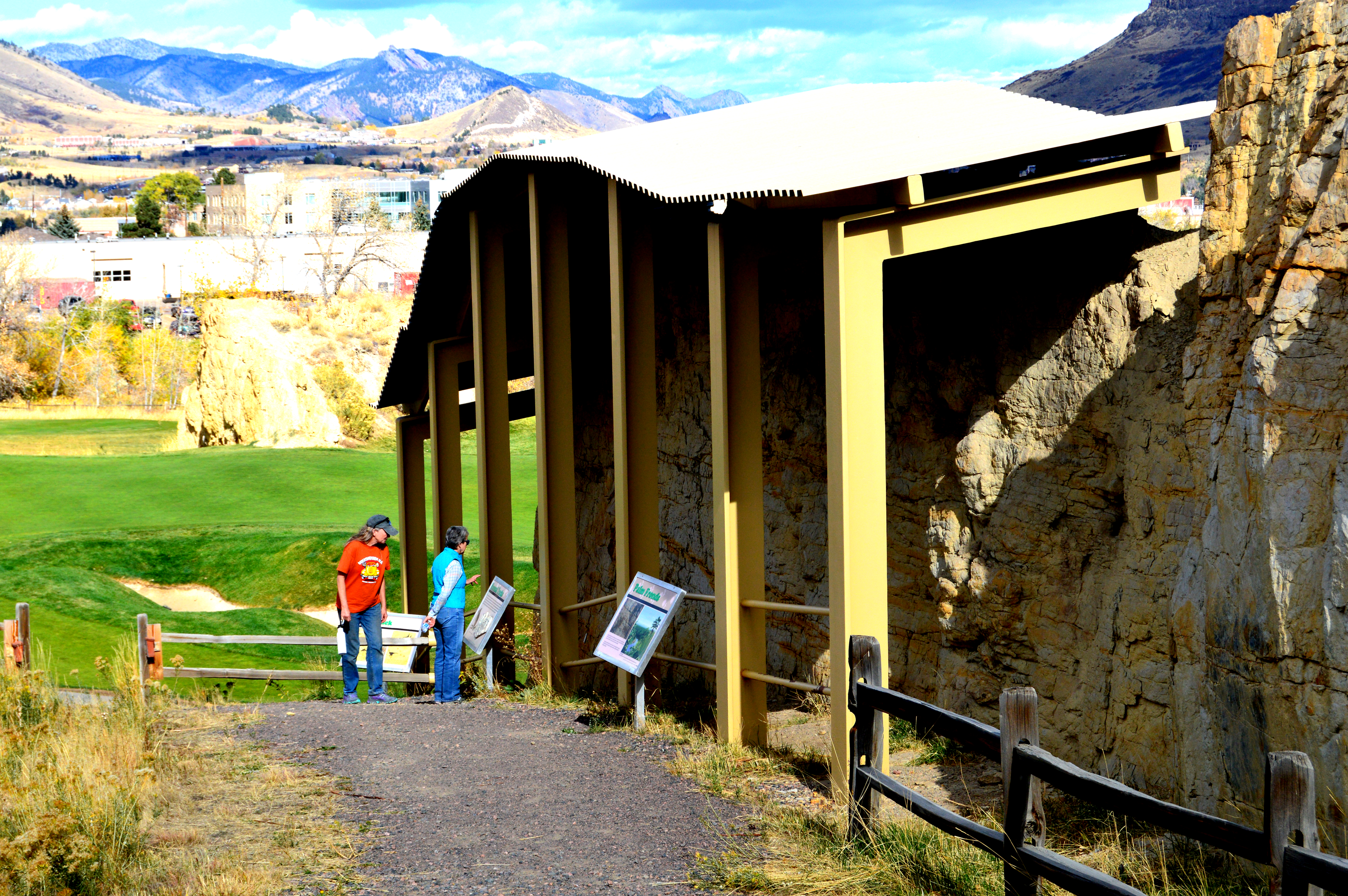
- Visitors examine the preserved tracks at the Parfet Prehistoric Preserve

- Location within Colorado
- Location: Golden, Colorado, USA
- Coordinates: 39.7433°N 105.2195°W

U.S. National Natural Landmark
- Designated: 2011

The Parfet Prehistoric Preserve is a dinosaur track site in Golden, Colorado. The site is accessible to the public via the Triceratops Trail, a 1.5-mile walking trail maintained by the Friends of Dinosaur Ridge.

Tracks include those of Triceratops, a possible Tyrannosaurus rex, and a possible Edmontosaurus. Non-dinosaur tracks include those of birds, small mammals, and beetles. Palm frond impressions are also preserved.

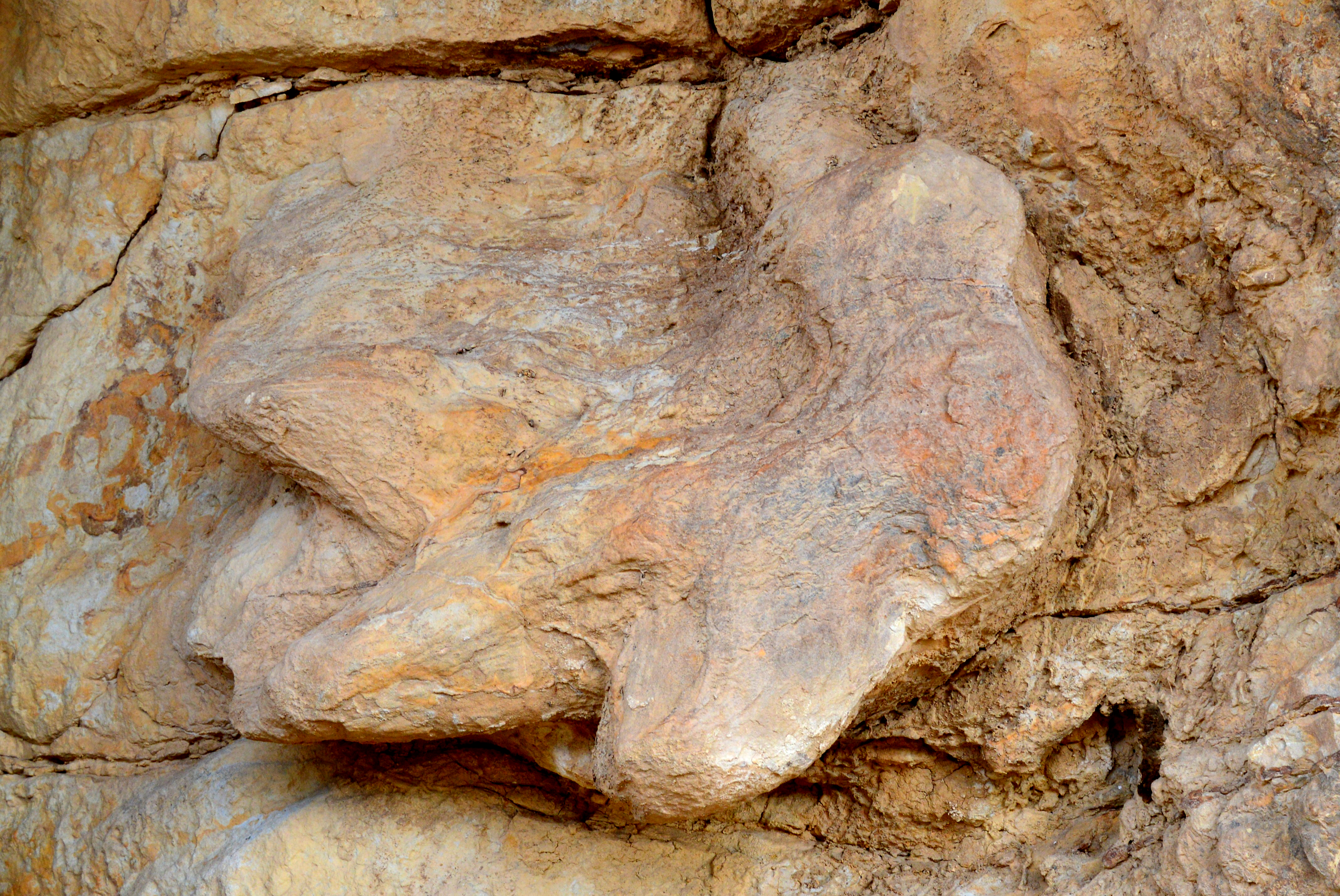
Triceratops footprint at Parfet Prehistoric Preserve

The tracks occur in the Upper Cretaceous Laramie Formation, deposited in a semi-tropical swamp about 68 million years ago. The tracks were exposed by a now-discontinued clay mining at the Parfet Clay Pits. The tracks were exposed when the clay layers were removed by the mining, revealing track impressions preserved in the overlying sandstone layers, which are now tilted into a vertical position.

The site was designated a National Natural Landmark in June 2011 by expansion of the Morrison Fossil Area, also known as Dinosaur Ridge, which is about three miles south of the Parfet Prehistoric Preserve. The combined National Natural Landmark is now the Morrisson-Golden Fossil Areas.
