= Krampus Expédition =

Water roller coaster at Nigloland

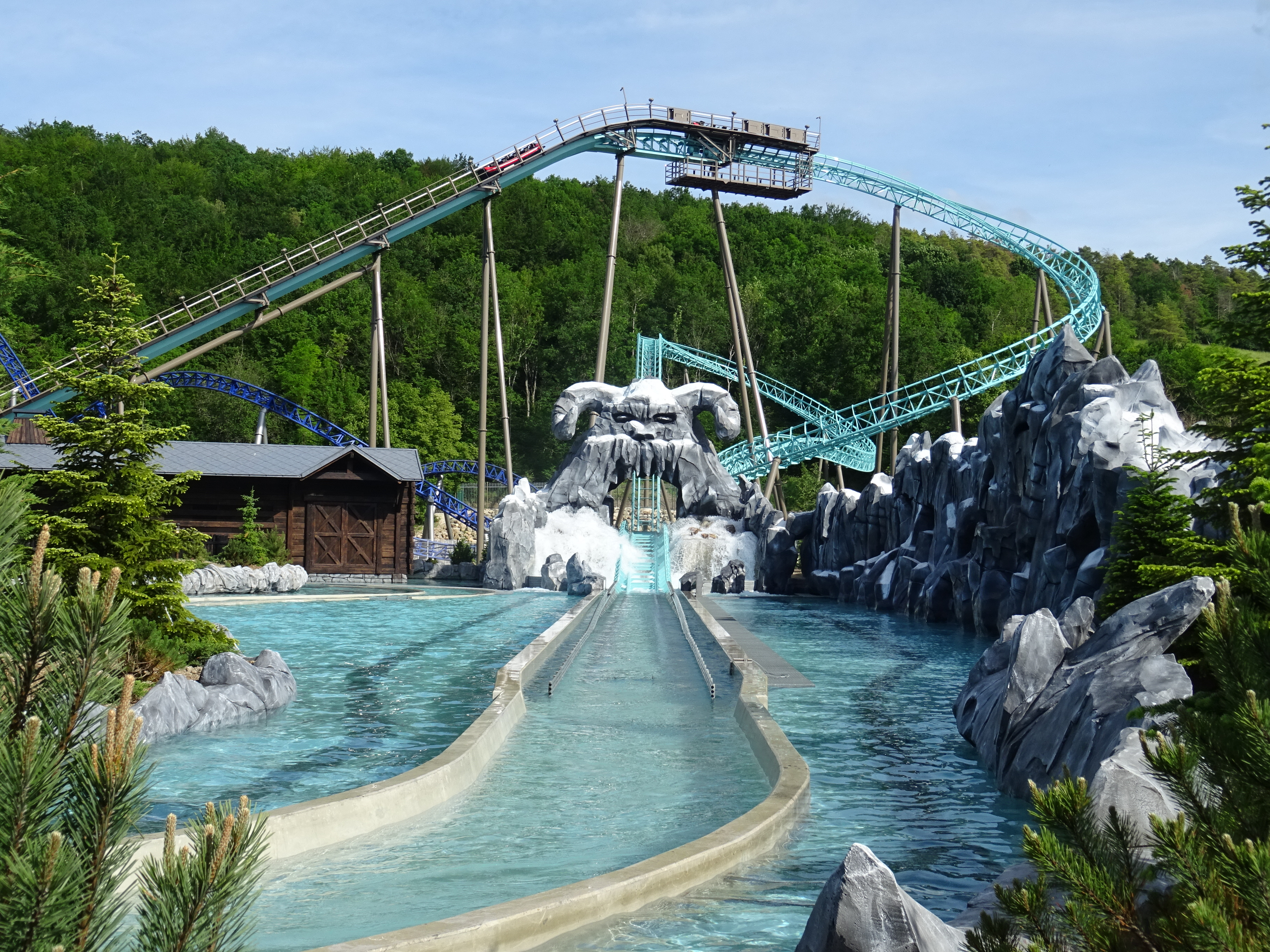

Nigloland
- Location: Nigloland
- Park section: The Swiss Village
- Coordinates: 48.261667°N 4.614167°E
- Status: Operating
- Opening date: June 12, 2021; 3 years ago
- Cost: €12,000,000
- Replaced: Grand Roue

General statistics
- Type: Steel
- Manufacturer: Mack Rides
- Model: Water Coaster
- Lift/launch system: Chain lift hill
- Height: 91.9 ft (28.0 m)
- Length: 1,968.5 ft (600.0 m)
- Speed: 49 mph (79 km/h)
- Inversions: 0
- Duration: 4:00
- Capacity: 850 riders per hour
- G-force: 3.5
- Height restriction: 110 cm (3 ft 7 in)
- Trains: 6 trains with a single car. Riders are arranged 2 across in 4 rows for a total of 8 riders per train.
- Theme: Krampus
- Website: Official website
- Krampus Expédition at RCDB

Krampus Expédition is a water coaster at Nigloland in Dolancourt, France. The coaster opened on June 12, 2021 after spending multiple years under development, and takes riders on an expedition to find the mythical, figurative Krampus. The ride was designed and manufactured by Mack Rides and Nigloland's creative team, and represents an €12 million investment; the park's largest since its inception in 1987.

== History ==
Nigloland's owners - the Gélis family - had wanted to build a water coaster for a long time, ever since Poseidon had debuted at Europa-Park in 2000. During interviews in 2014, following up on the debut of the Mack Rides creation Alpina Blitz, project manager Rodolphe Gélis once again expressed the park's interest in a major new water attraction if attendance figures stayed profitable.

The water coaster began development in 2017, following the opening of the Extreme Dungeon drop tower the year before. The attraction was developed over the course of two years, with park officials deciding on a patch of land in between Alpina Blitz and the adjacent hotel. A Mack Rides Supersplash - similar to Europa Park's Atlantica SuperSplash - was initially sought after, but was dropped after ride engineers were unable to fit the bulky attraction into the limited plot of land, and a smaller-scale variant entered development. In order to accommodate the new attraction, the park's Grand Roue ferris wheel was dismantled after the 2019 season and relocated within the park to the site of the former Bobsleigh coaster.

French forums Coastersworld.fr hosted a livestream on May 21, 2020, where they recapped a recent Planet Coaster competition; contestants had been tasked with designing a possible new coaster for Nigloland. During the stream, Rodolphe Gélis made an appearance to give the first official confirmation of a new coaster project, which would open for the 2021 season. A day earlier, on May 20, the park had trademarked the name Krampus Expédition with the National Institute of Industrial Property, which remained uncovered by the public until several months later. Construction of the ride progressed throughout the 2020 season, and the coaster track began to arrive in the fall. The first pieces of track were placed in October 2020, and the coaster portion was completed on November 27, 2020.

In a fall 2020 interview with local park fanbase Niglofans, Rodolphe Gélis confirmed the addition of Krampus Expédition and released various technical aspects and details about the attraction. Following a number of teasers, Krampus Expédition was formally announced by Nigloland on December 10, 2020, as France's first water coaster and the park's largest investment to date at €12,000,000. The coaster made its first test runs on February 20, 2021. Krampus Expédition officially opened to the public on June 12, 2021.

== Ride experience ==
=== Queue ===
Riders enter the queue, and after navigating a curved footpath, take a fight of stairs up on top of the station. Beside these stairs, various posters are plastered on the building's side referencing multiple well-known rapids rides around the world. These include Mystic River Falls at Silver Dollar City, Fjord-Rafting at Europa-Park, Popeye & Bluto's Bilge-Rat Barges at Universal's Islands of Adventure, River Quest at Phantasialand, Grizzly River Run at Disney California Adventure, and Waschgzuber Rafting at Erlebnispark Tripsdrill. Riders cross over the station platform and enter an attic, navigating their way around piles of furniture. A staircase leads back down to ground level, where riders encounter relics from previous voyages - including the skeleton of a young Krampus - and an outdoor overflow queue. Following this, riders enter the station platform and board the cars.

=== Onride ===
Riders dispatch from the station into a short flume section, which makes a 180° turnaround to the right, where the car engages with the coaster track. The cars then ascend the lift hill to a peak height of 91.9 feet (28.0 m). Upon reaching the top, the car descends into a helix outside of the park perimeter and into a twisted airtime hill over a maintenance road. Riders make a left-hand turnaround before descending into the coaster's finale; a final plunge below-ground, which is followed up by a speed hill through a rockwork structure of the Krampus's head, and into the climactic splashdown. Riders make a right-hand turn in the flume section and lazily meander back to the station building, where the cars re-embark the coaster track inside. The ride experience lasts an advertised 4 minutes.

== Characteristics ==
=== Statistics ===
Krampus Expédition stands 91.9 feet (28.0 m) tall and - coaster track and flume section combined - is 1,968.5 feet (600.0 m) long. The coaster runs six cars that seat 8 people each, in four rows of two, which allow the coaster to achieve a theoretical capacity of 850 rider per hour. The cars are also capable of reaching a top speed of 49 mph (79 km/h).

=== Theme ===
Krampus Expédition is themed as a journey through the Swiss Alps to find the mythical Krampus folklore beast; half-man and half-goat. Given the Krampus's fearsome stature, it is used figuratively by the park in order to appeal to a wider audience and not scare younger riders. The theming and rockwork was completed by Universal Rocks.

=== Design ===
Numerous design changes were made to the Mack Rides water coaster hardware for Krampus Expédition, chiefly the usage of a new tri-tube track on the coaster portion. Past water coasters didn't use such, but updated standards led to a reinforcement of the track design. A mid-course brake run was also planned to be installed just before the final drop, but Rodolphe Gélis - critical of the concept - convinced engineers at Mack Rides not to do so by proving that it would have no effect on the ride's hourly throughput.
