= Nigloland =

Theme park located in Dolancourt, France

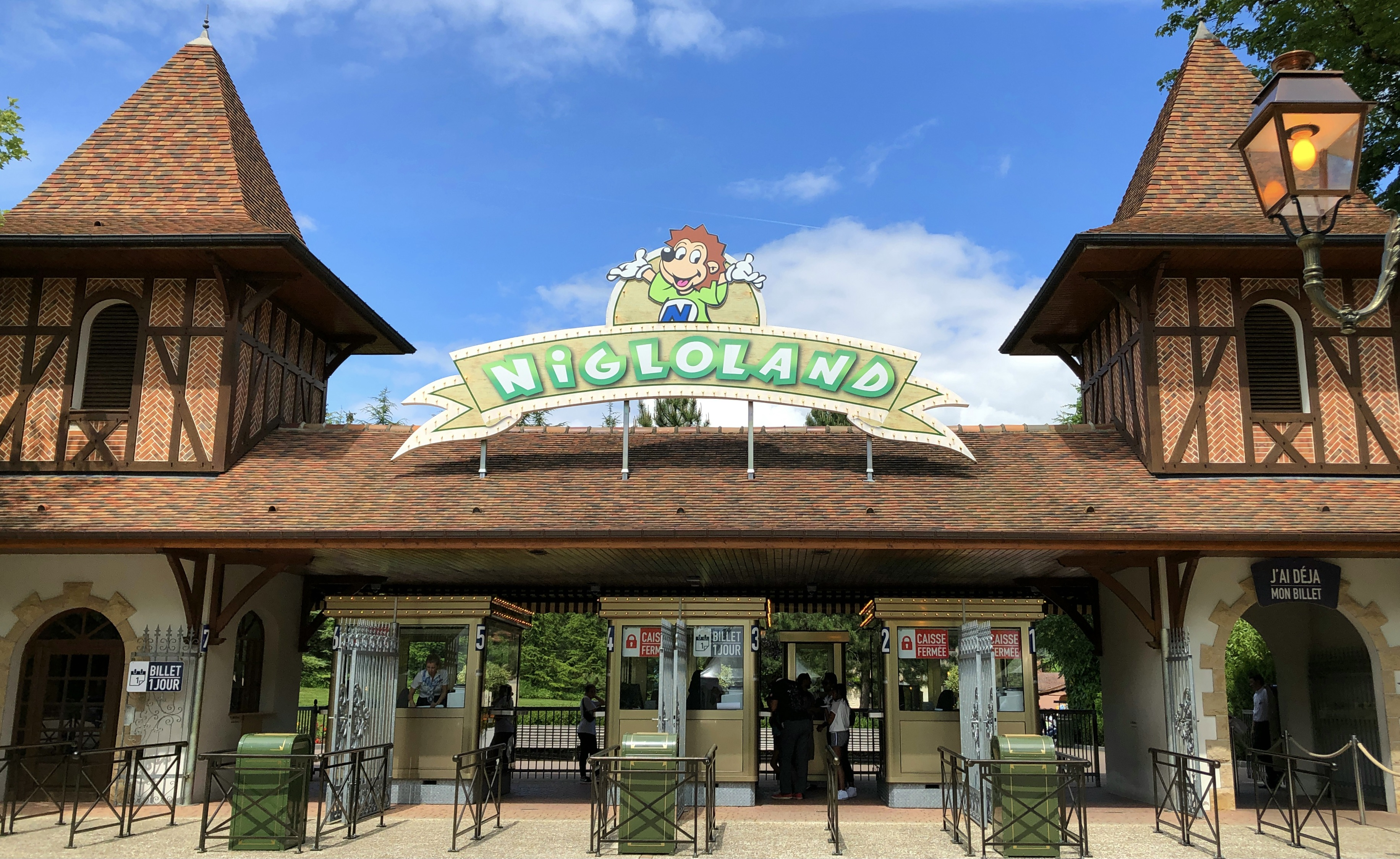
- Park entrance
- Interactive map of Nigloland
- Location: Dolancourt, Aube, France
- Coordinates: 48.2633°N 4.6070°E
- Opened: June 1, 1987; 39 years ago
- Owner: SARL Gélis frères
- Attendance: 763,000 (2022)
- Area: 40 ha (99 acres)

Attractions
- Total: 38
- Roller coasters: 6
- Water rides: 4
- Website: www.nigloland.fr

Nigloland is an amusement park in Dolancourt in the French department of Aube. It is one of the most visited parks in France after Disneyland Paris and Parc Astérix.

Nigloland was created by two brothers, Patrice and Philippe Gélis. The park opened June 1, 1987. The name "Nigloland" comes from its mascot, "Niglo", meaning hedgehog in Romani.

The park is divided into four areas: "The Canadian village", "The rock'n'roll village," "The magical village" and "The Swiss village".

== History ==
=== Beginnings ===
Nigloland opened on June 13, 1987, thanks to the initiative of the Gélis brothers Patrice and Philippe, who were inspired by their trip to the United States where they discovered amusement parks with a single entrance ticket The Gélis brothers visited the Walt Disney World Resort in the early 1980s.

The two brothers invested seven million francs to install a park in the family property of eighteen hectares in Dolancourt. Initially, the park was composed of a small creperie, a restaurant, and seven attractions and installations: "Train western", "Tacots 1900", "Aventure land", "Ciné show 180°", "Niglogolf", "Carrousel 1900", and "Château hanté". The number of visits was 100,000 per season, with the breakeven point being 50,000 annual visitors.

In 1988 Nigloland opened its first roller coaster, "Bayern Express" also known as the "Lost City of Gold," as well as the pirate ship ride, "Galion pirate." The following year, the "Rivière canadienne" made its appearance, followed in 1990 by the "Circuit de Nigloland," an attraction that allows visitors to drive guided race cars on rails and the "Caravelles de Jacques Cartier."

The park celebrated its one-millionth visitor on its fifth anniversary and inaugurated the "Niglo Show," a show of animatronics inspired by "Country Bear Jamboree" at some Disney parks.

=== 1990s ===
In 1991 Nigloland welcomed 350,000 visitors. The park offered its customers a Mine Train ride for the inauguration of the Canadian village in 1992. That year, the park's attendance increased to 350,000 entries. In 1993, the Toison d'Or Par went bankrupt and was taken over by the city of Dijon. The management of Nigloland bought the equipment from Toison d'Or Park at scrap prices from a subsidiary of Lyonnaise des Eaux. This acquisition and the relocation of some of the attractions cost nearly twenty million francs, or approximately three million euros.

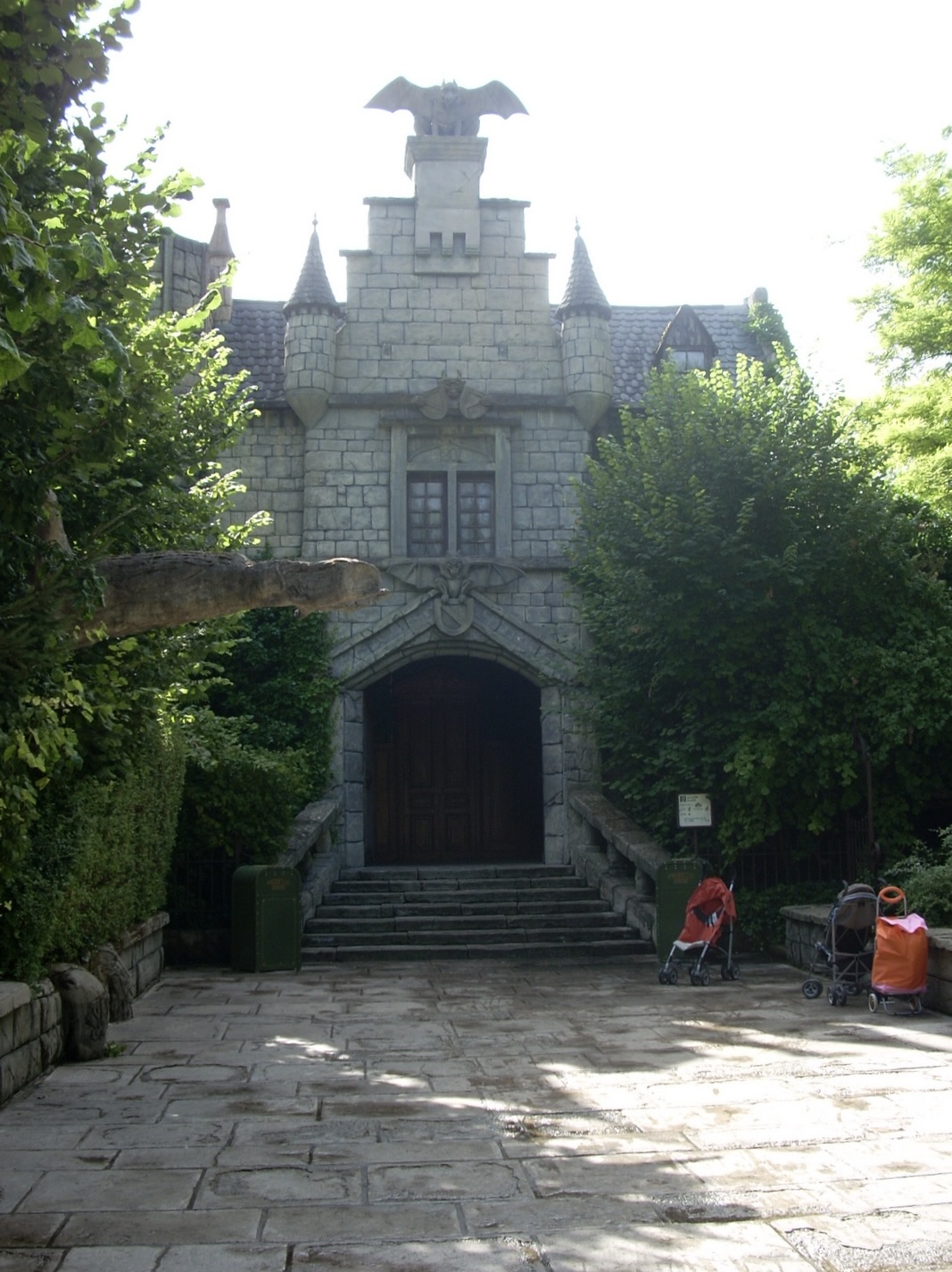
Manoir hanté (Haunted Manor).

Thus a new village, the village merveilleux, opened with new attractions including the Rivière enchantée (Enchanted River) and the Petit Poucet (Tom Thumb).

After spending six years at the park, Bayern Express left Nigloland in 1994 for Sunway Lagoon, a park in Malaysia, due to noise pollution problems and maintenance costs. To replace this attraction, the Haunted Manor arrived at the park. The roller coaster Train de la mine from the Toison d'Or park, now belonging to the Gélis brothers, was also transferred to a Malaysian park, Genting Theme Park, under the name Rolling Thunder Mine Train. (Note: The outdoor section of Genting Theme Park where the attraction is located closed on August 31, 2013. It is planned to reopen in the second quarter of 2021 under the name Genting SkyWorlds with a 20th Century Studios license; it was initially planned to reopen in 2016 under the name 20th Century Fox World before the studio was acquired by The Walt Disney Company.) In 1995: La Course de bobsleigh, roller coasters straight from German fairs, made their appearance after a brief stay in Sweden. That same year, attendance reached 470000 visitors.

The opening of the Flying Dragons in 1996 allowed the 450000 visitors to enjoy a panoramic view of the park. In 1997, the Chenille and the Hérissons dans la forêt magique were two novelties intended for the youngest visitors. 480000 visitors were accumulated this season.

In 1998, 450,000 visitors passed through the park gates and Nigloland inaugurated the Spatiale Experience in the spring, an indoor roller coaster immersed in a huge futuristic building, themed around a space journey, inspired by the Space Mountain attraction. With a length of eight hundred meters, it has a very dense course with descents and turns. The construction took almost a year.

=== 2000s ===
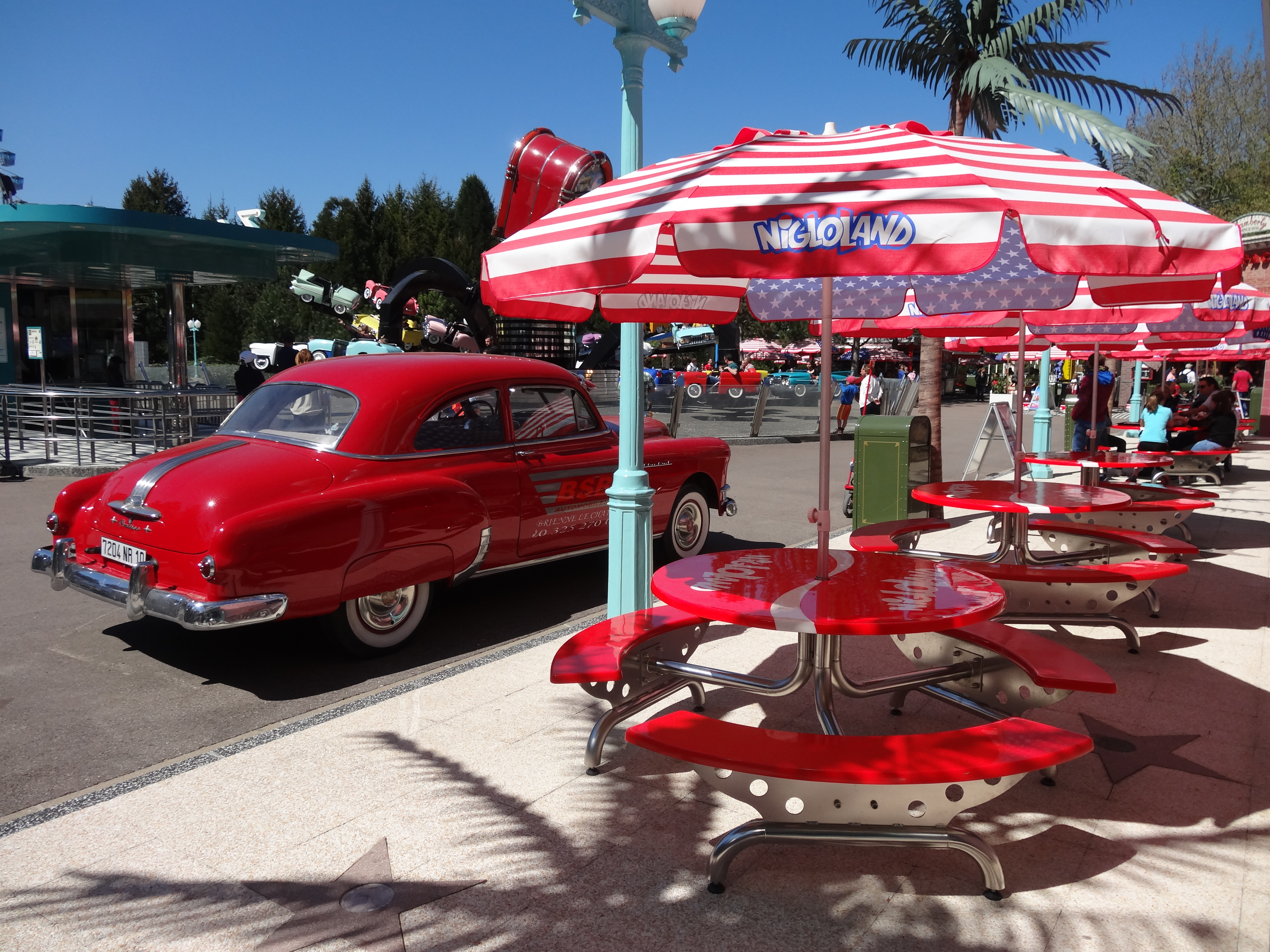
The rock 'n' roll village.

With the creation of the new rock 'n' roll zone, the park opened National 66 in 1999, Juke box in 2000 and Hollywood Boulevard in 2001. For 2002, Nigloland opened Bat Coaster, France's first inverted roller coaster built by Pinfari. 480,000 people walked the park's alleys in 2002.

In 2003 the park now offered around thirty attractions. The new attraction Dinosaurs Adventure enabled the park to attract 515,000 visitors. In 2004, Nigloland inaugurated King of Mississippi and received 496,547 customers. In 2005, the park opened the Pirates' Hotel, the park's first hotel, themed around piracy. This season ended with 430,408 visitors.

An accident occurred on April 9, 2005 on the Bat Coaster ride, injuring five people, one of them seriously due to a mechanical accident involving a lifting device. This attraction was sold in 2007 to Antibes Land.

The novelties accumulate from 2006 with the Grizzli, a Disk'O Coaster fifteen meters high on a nine-meter diameter disc, followed in 2007 by a Schlitt' Express Wild Mouse, the Ronde des canards, a ride for children and the Deudeuche Show, a new show. The years 2006, 2007 and 2008 saw 445,000, 467,000 and 473,000 visitors in the park. In 2008, the park opened a new attraction for children: the ferme d'Antonin. This ride allows the opening of the Swiss village, delimited by new chalets.

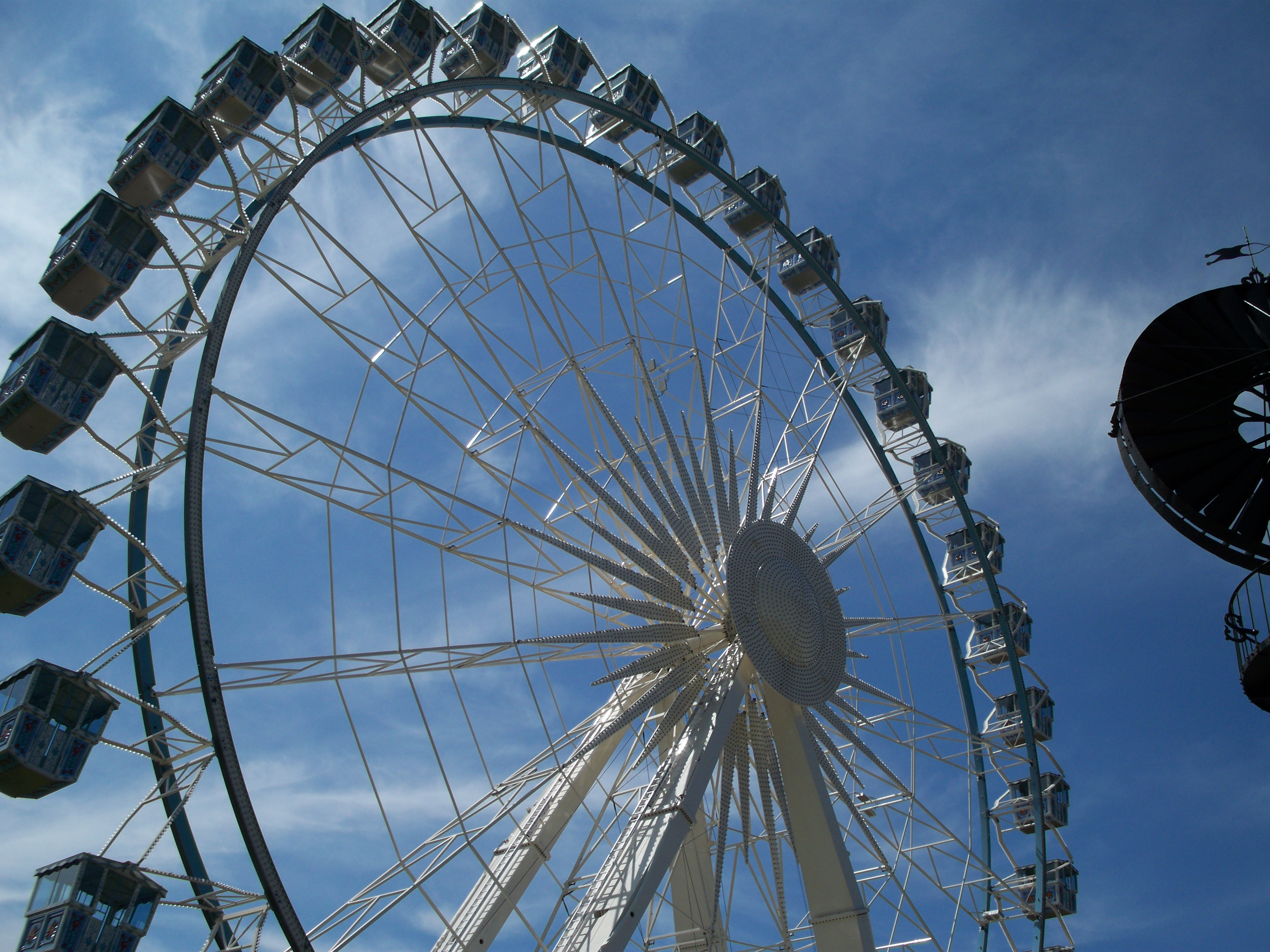
The Ferris wheel by Gerstlauer.

Since 2009 a ferris wheel by Gerstlauer of fifty meters high has been installed in the Swiss village. The 2009 season was the last for the cinema named Planète 180°. That same year, the leaders expressed their intention to develop its hotel complex by adding "cottages" on the theme of the Caribbean. This project will not materialize.

=== 2010s ===
In 2010 the novelties are the flying chair ride Apple Flight, a new show La Parade des caniches and a restaurant in the Swiss village, Lara Clette. In 2011, a new magic show named Las Vegas Show is installed in the park.

In September 2011 the park served as a shooting location for scenes from the film Comme des frères, renamed "Fifouland" for the occasion on the big screen.

Two attractions appeared in 2012. Air Meeting by Gerstlauer is a ride in which airplanes turn around an axis. The specificity of Air Meeting is that passengers control the movements of their plane on another axis, which allows for looping. Route de l'essence is a children's carousel. This ride temporarily left the park after the 2013 season.

One of the oldest attractions, Adventure Jungle, was renovated in 2013 and renamed Africa Cruise for the occasion. The track and station were modified and many animatronics were added to the ride. Additionally, the park invested in the construction of a Champagne-style house at the park entrance.

Nigloland opened the roller coaster circuit Alpina Blitz in 2014 and reached 560,000 visitors by the end of the season.

In 2016 the leisure site offered two drop towers. The first one is called Le Donjon de l'extrême. With a height of 100 meters, this rotating freefall tower from the manufacturer Funtime is announced by park management as the tallest in France. La Tour des petits fantômes is aimed at young children. This family tower of the Spring Ride type from Zierer is 11 meters high. The 2017 season was the last for La Course de bobsleigh which moved to Parc de la Vallée, in Poitou-Charentes, in 2018. In the same year, Nigloland opened Les Zabeilles, an airplane ride. The park reached an annual attendance of 655,000 visitors in 2018.

The novelty of 2019 is the 'Eden Palais', which recorded 635,000 entries.

=== 2020s ===
In 2020 the Chenille also leaves Nigloland to join the Parc de la Vallée. The junior roller coaster Noisette Express is added to the attractions. That same season, the Grande roue moves within the park. The start of the season is postponed to July 11, 2020, due to the COVID-19 pandemic. With a budget of 12 million euros, Krampus Expédition is inaugurated in 2021.

The park is increasingly aiming for attractiveness by becoming a themed park that tends to become a resort.

In 2022, for the park's 35th anniversary, Nigloland renovated 3 mythical attractions:

- Les montgolfières becoming Le voyage en Montgolfières (The Balloons becoming The Balloon Voyage)
- Le Niglo Show
- Les hérissons de la forêt magique (The hedgehogs of the magical forest)

That year, the park reached a record attendance of 763,000 visitors.

In 2023, Nigloland revamped the "Rivière Enchantée" (Enchanted River) into the "Rivière des Fées" (River of Fairies).

On 22 June 2026, Nigoland announced Supersonic 1887, its seventh roller coaster. Expected to open in 2027, it will become the second Mack Rides Stryker Coaster to be built after Voltron Nevera in 2024.

== Rides ==
The park is home to 39 rides, including:

- Le Donjon de l'Extrême, a 100 m (328 feet) drop tower, the highest in France (2016)
- Alpina Blitz, the first Megalite type Mega-coaster from Mack Rides (2014)
- Air Meeting, the first Gerstlauer sky-fly ride (2012)
- La Grande Roue, a 50 m high Ferris wheel (2009)
- Le Grizzli, the first European Disk'O Coaster (2006)
- Dinosaures Adventure, an original walk-through ride in a dinosaur park (2003)
- Spatiale Experience, an indoor steel roller coaster, a bit smaller than Eurosat in Europa-Park (1998)

=== Coasters ===
==== Current ====
Name	Type	Manufacturer	Year
Alpina Blitz	Steel roller coaster	Mack Rides	2014
Descente en Schlitt'	Wild mouse	Mack Rides	2007
Gold Mine Train	Powered roller coaster	Mack Rides	1992
Krampus Expédition	Steel water coaster	Mack Rides	2021
Spatiale Expérience	Steel roller coaster	Mack Rides	1998
Noisette Express	Steel roller coaster	ART Engineering	2020

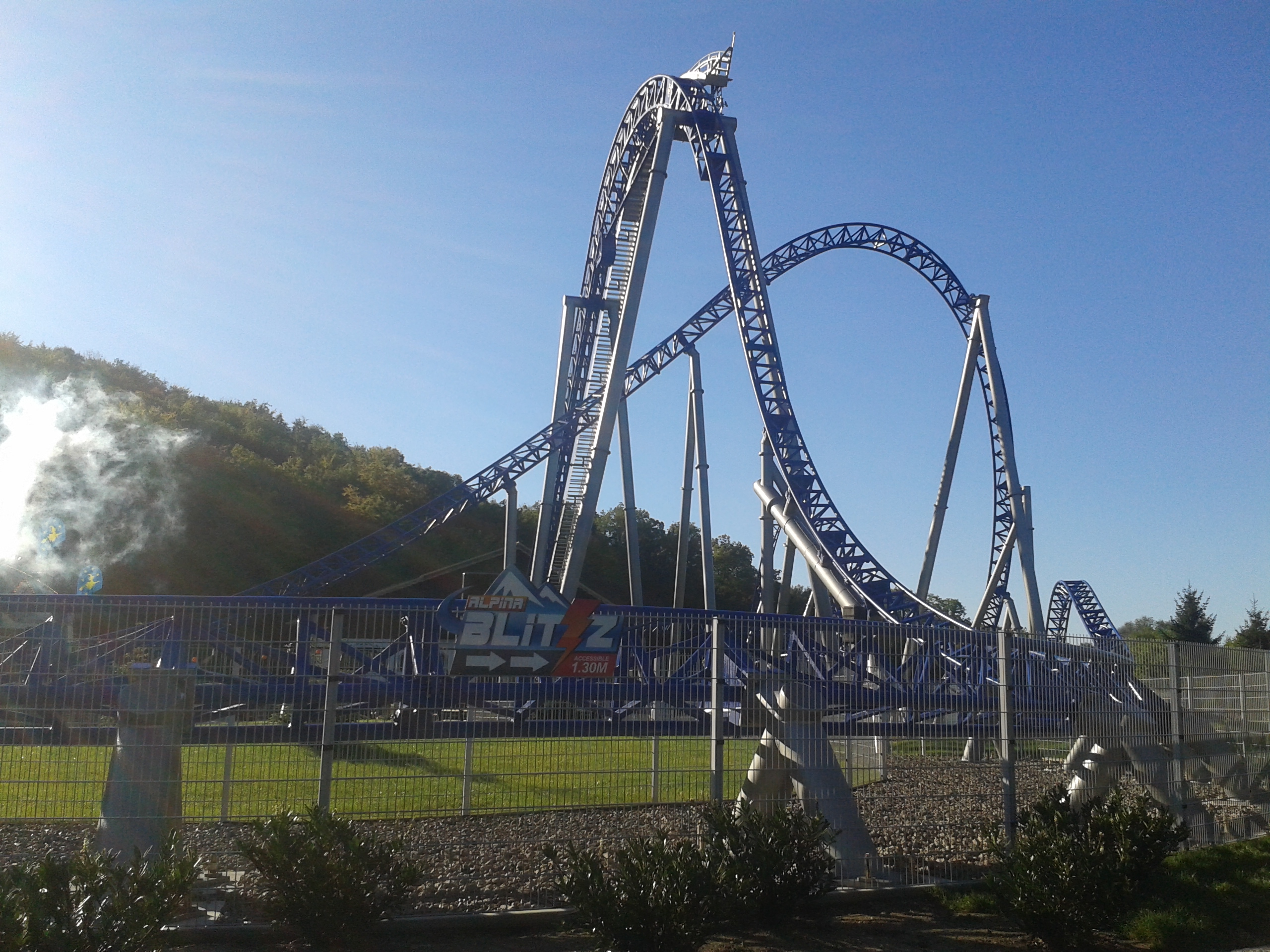
Alpina Blitz

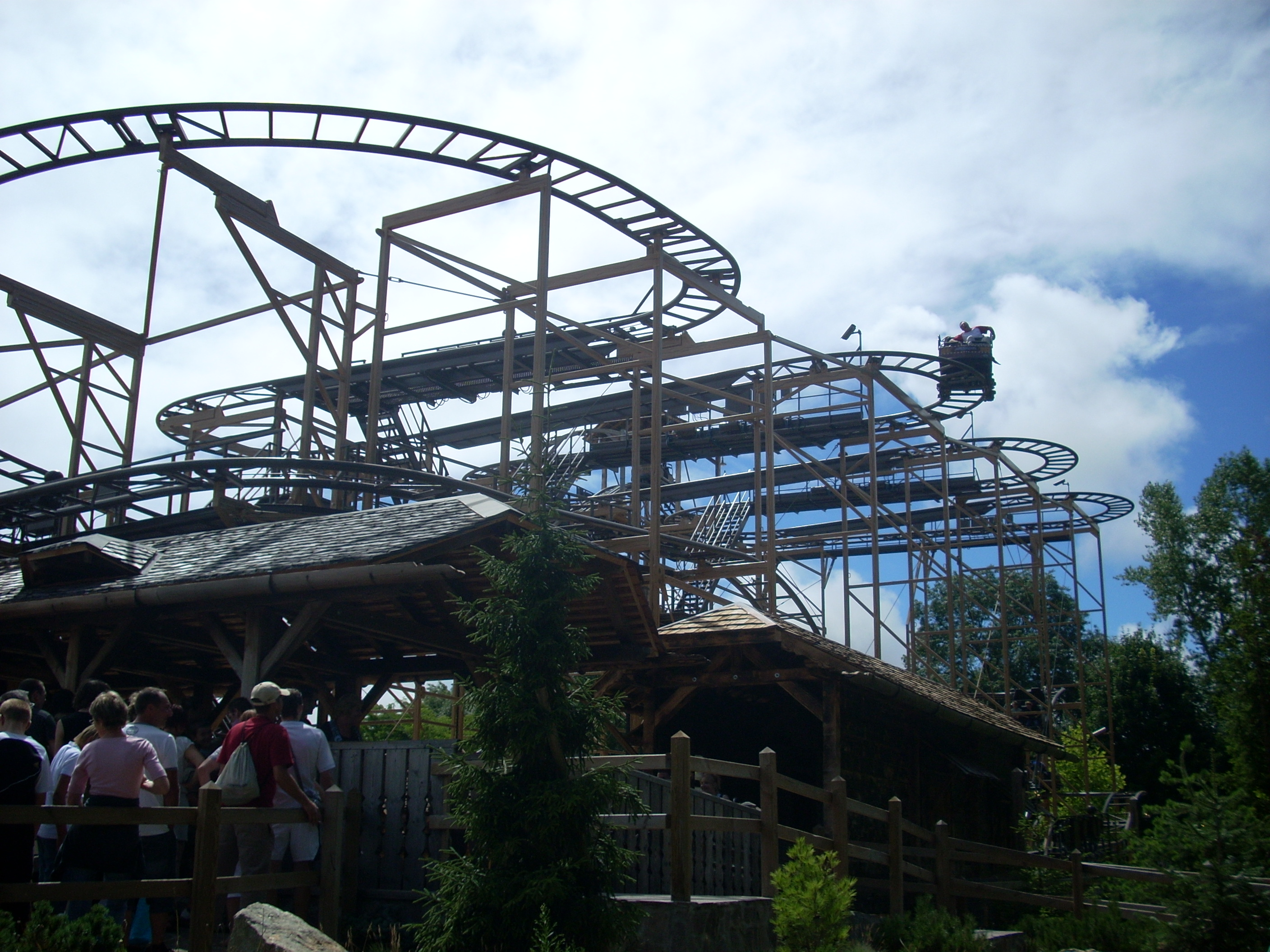
Descente en Schlitt'

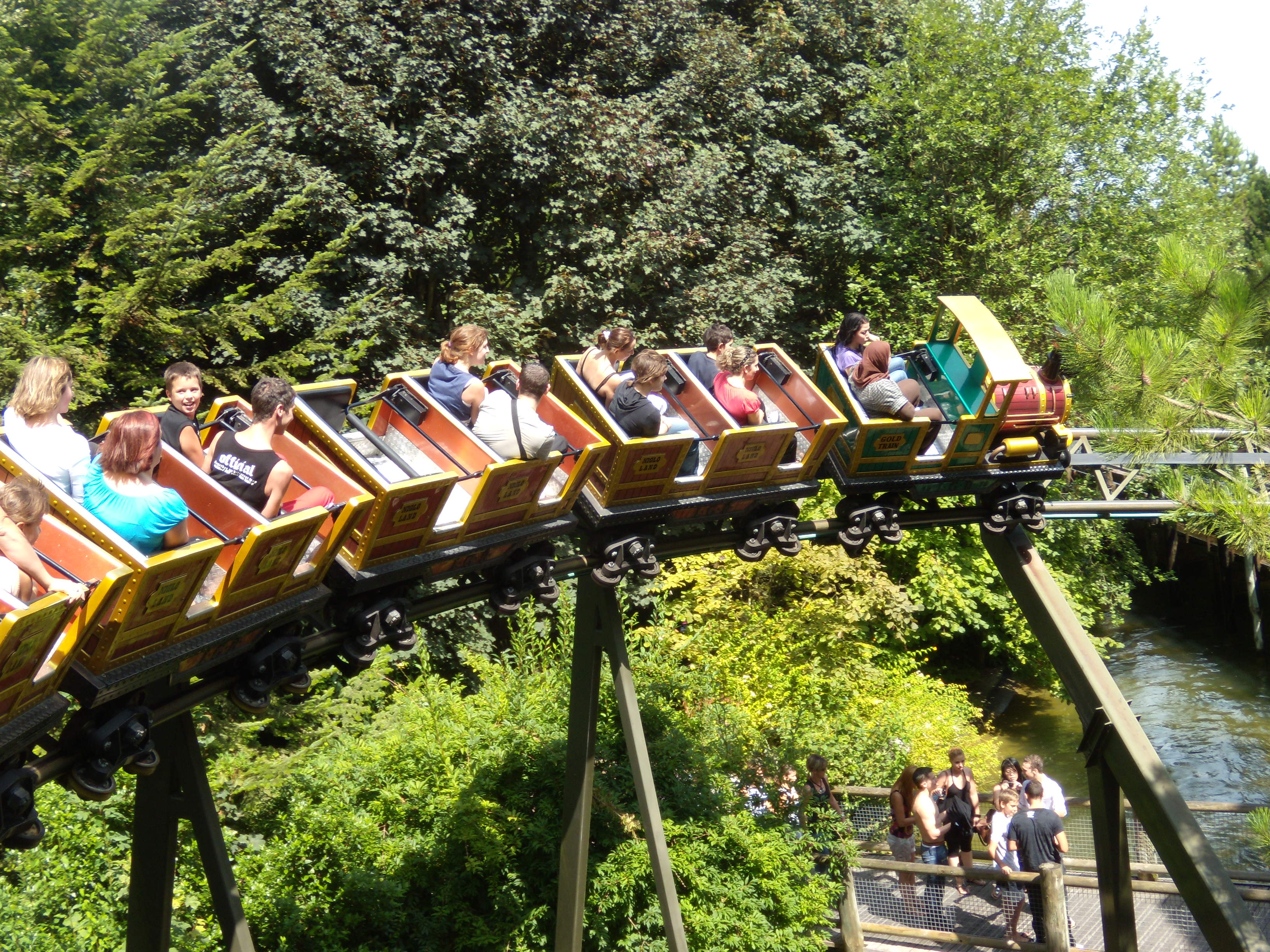
Gold Mine Train

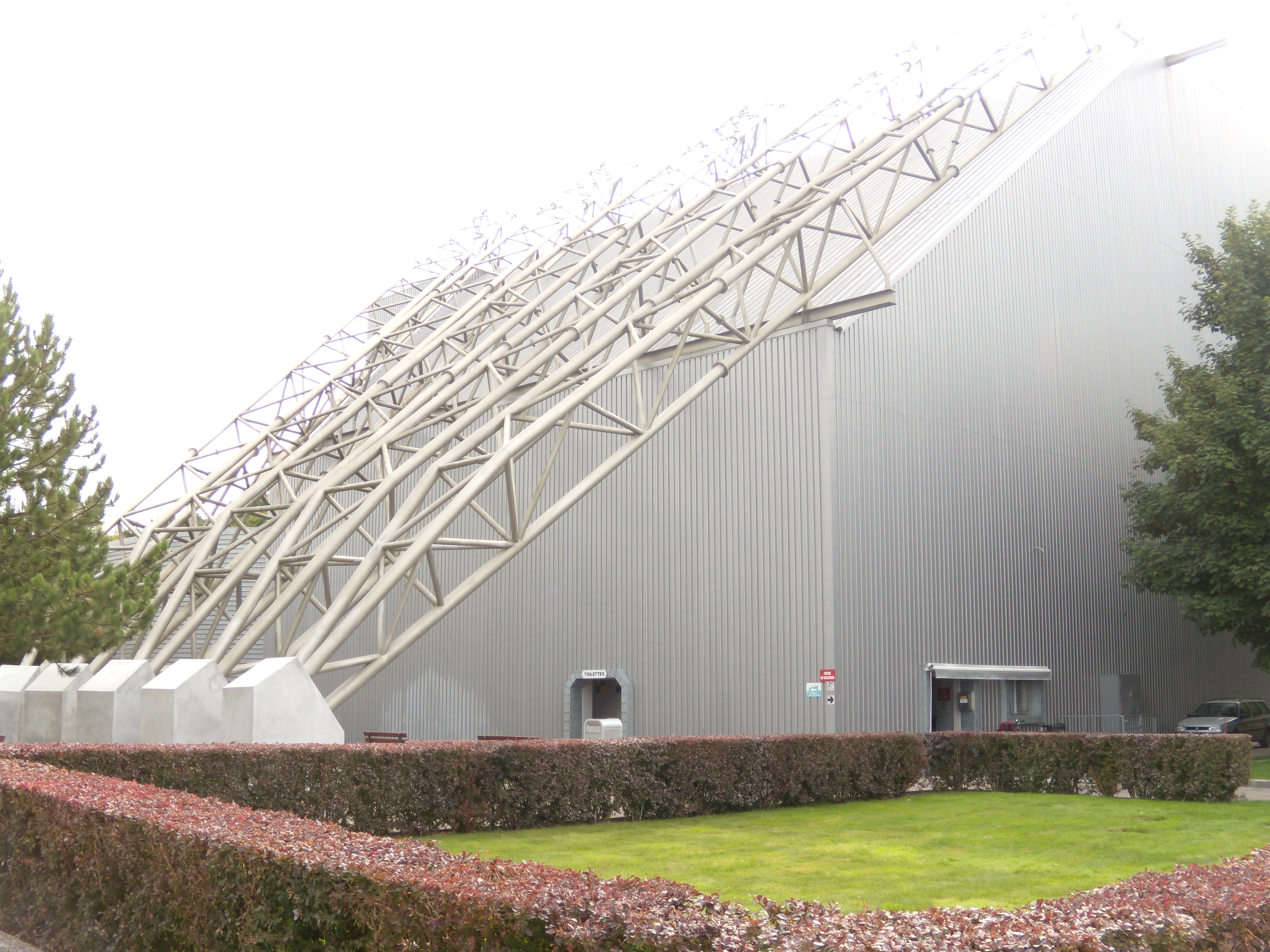
Spatiale Expérience

==== Former ====
Name	Type	Manufacturer	Year
Bat Coaster	Inverted roller coaster	Pinfari	2002–2006
Bayern Express	Steel roller coaster	Soquet	1988–1994
Chenille	Steel roller coaster	Pinfari	1997–2019
La course de Bobsleigh	Steel roller coaster	Anton Schwarzkopf	1995–2017

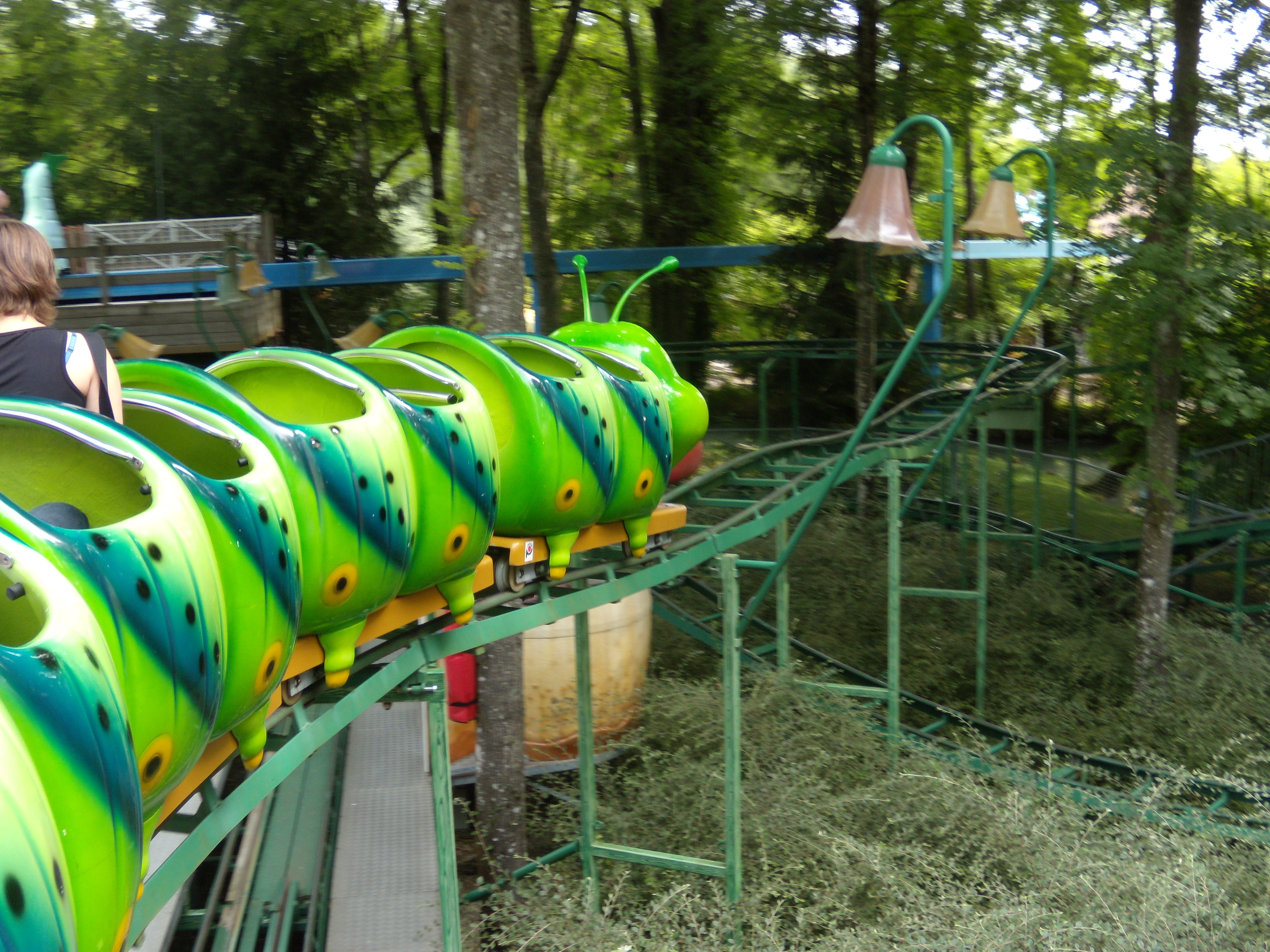
Chenille

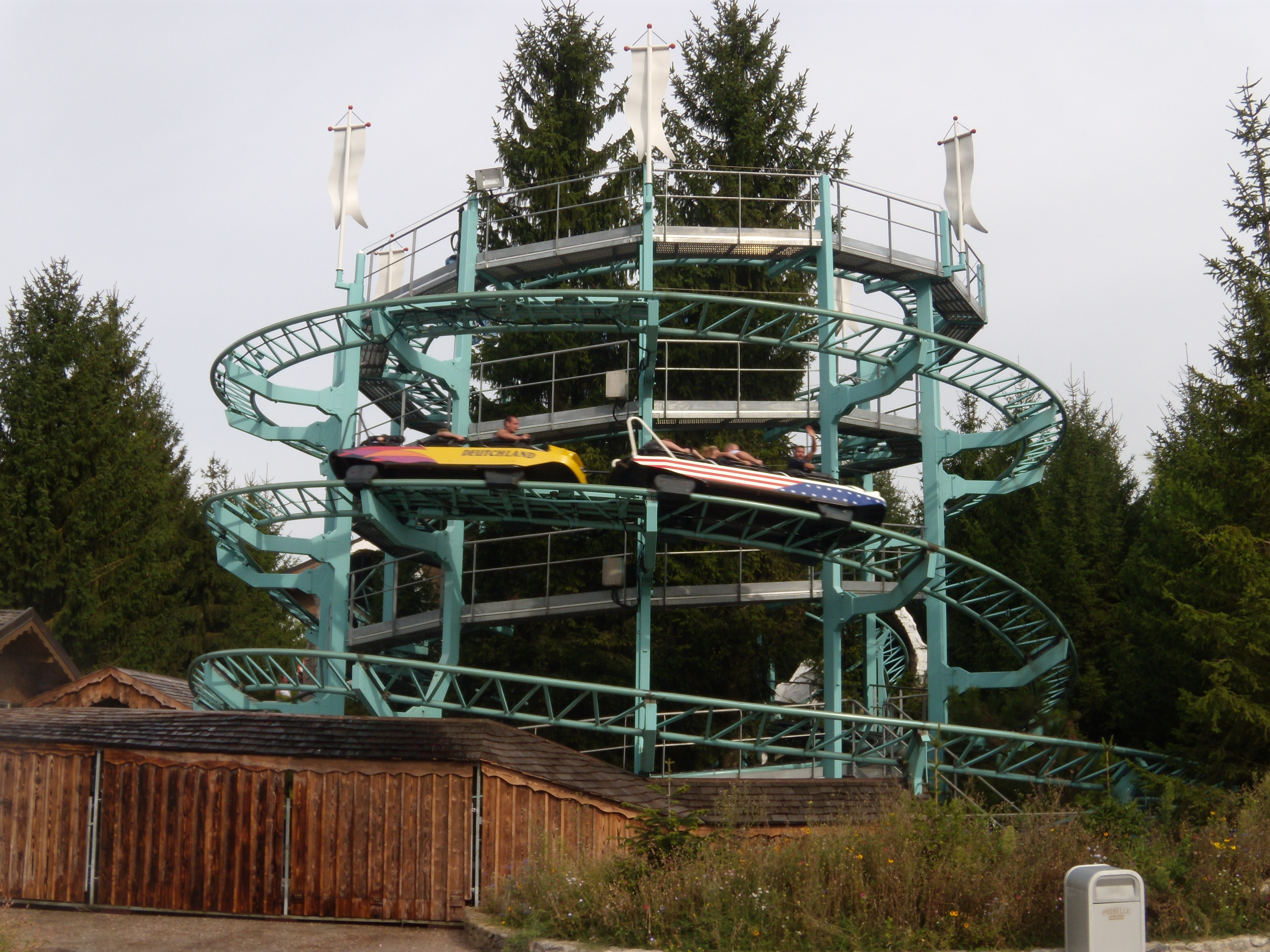
La course de Bobsleigh

=== Water rides ===
Name	Type	Manufacturer	Year
Africa Cruise (Note: Named Adventure Jungle until 2012.)	Tow boat ride	Mack Rides	1987
King of Mississippi	Boat ride	Mack Rides	2004
Rivière canadienne	Log flume	Mack Rides	1989
Rivière des Fées (la)	Boat ride	Mack Rides	1993 (updated in 2023)

=== Thrill rides ===
Name	Type	Manufacturer	Year
Air Meeting	Sky Fly	Gerstlauer	2012
Apple Flight	Wave Swinger	Zierer	2010
Donjon de l'extrême	Drop tower	Funtime	2016
Galion Pirate (le)	Swinging Ship	Zamperla	1988
Grizzli (le)	Disk'O Coaster	Zamperla	2006
Juke Box	Octopus	Anton Schwarzkopf	2000

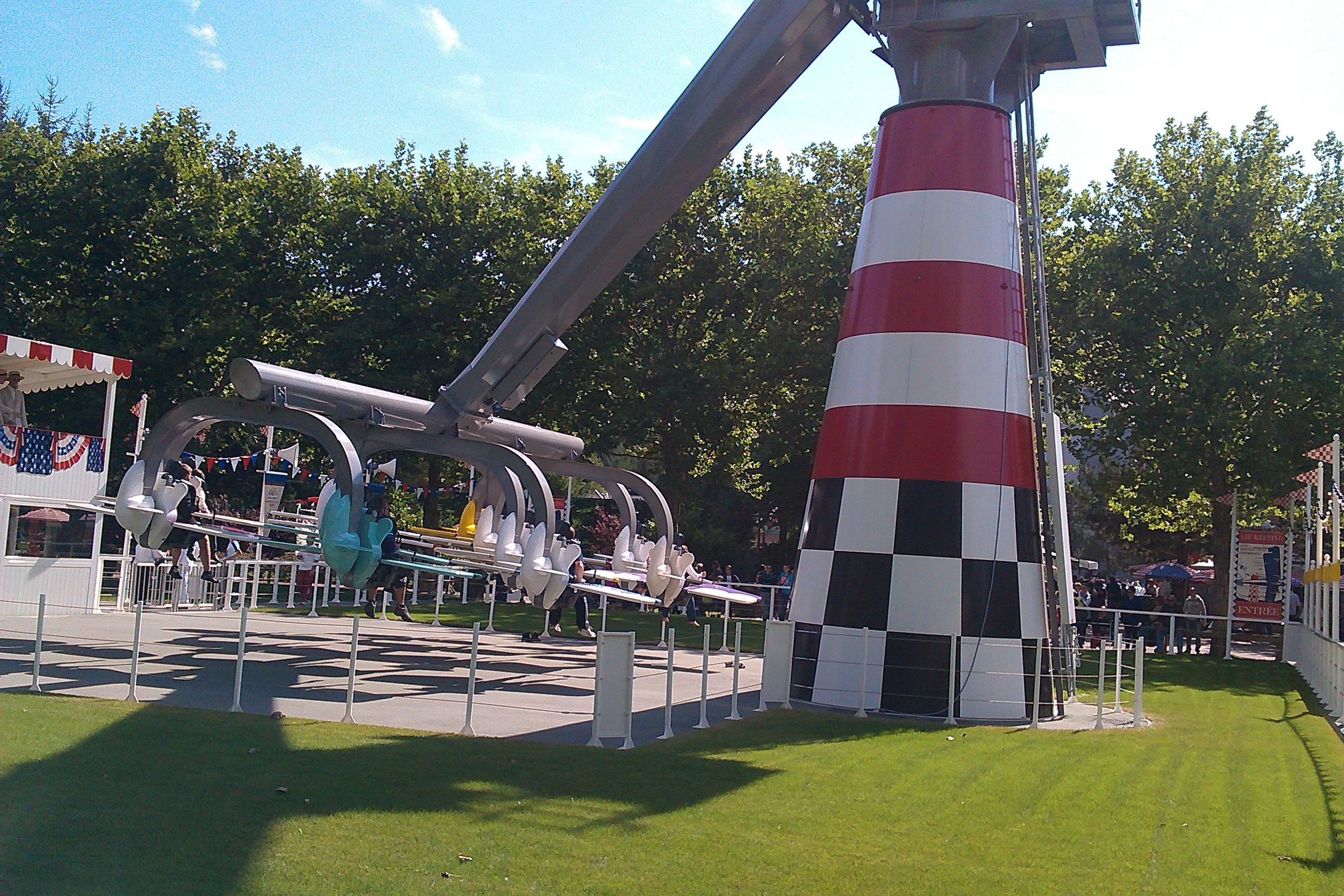
Air Meeting

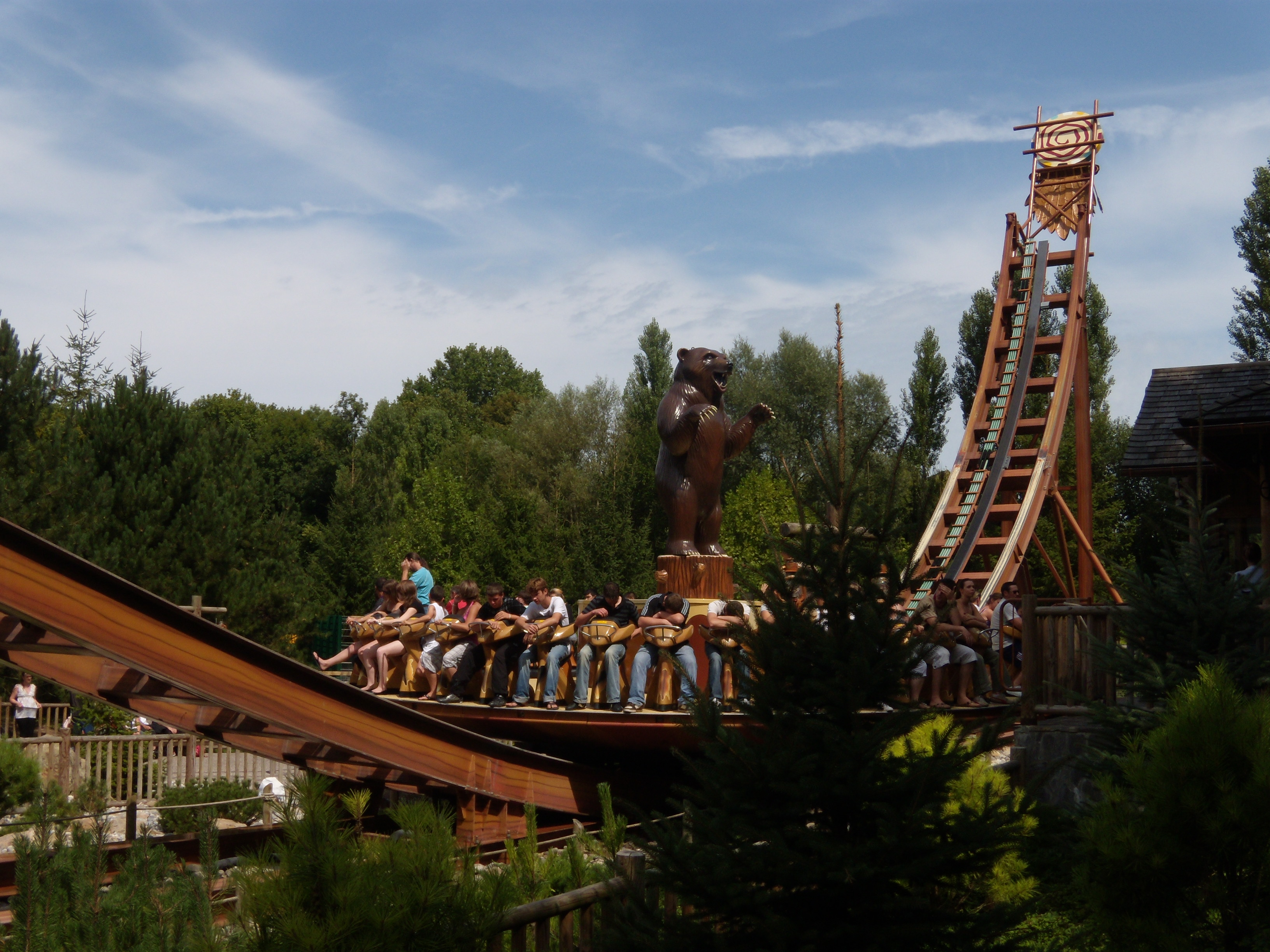
Grizzli

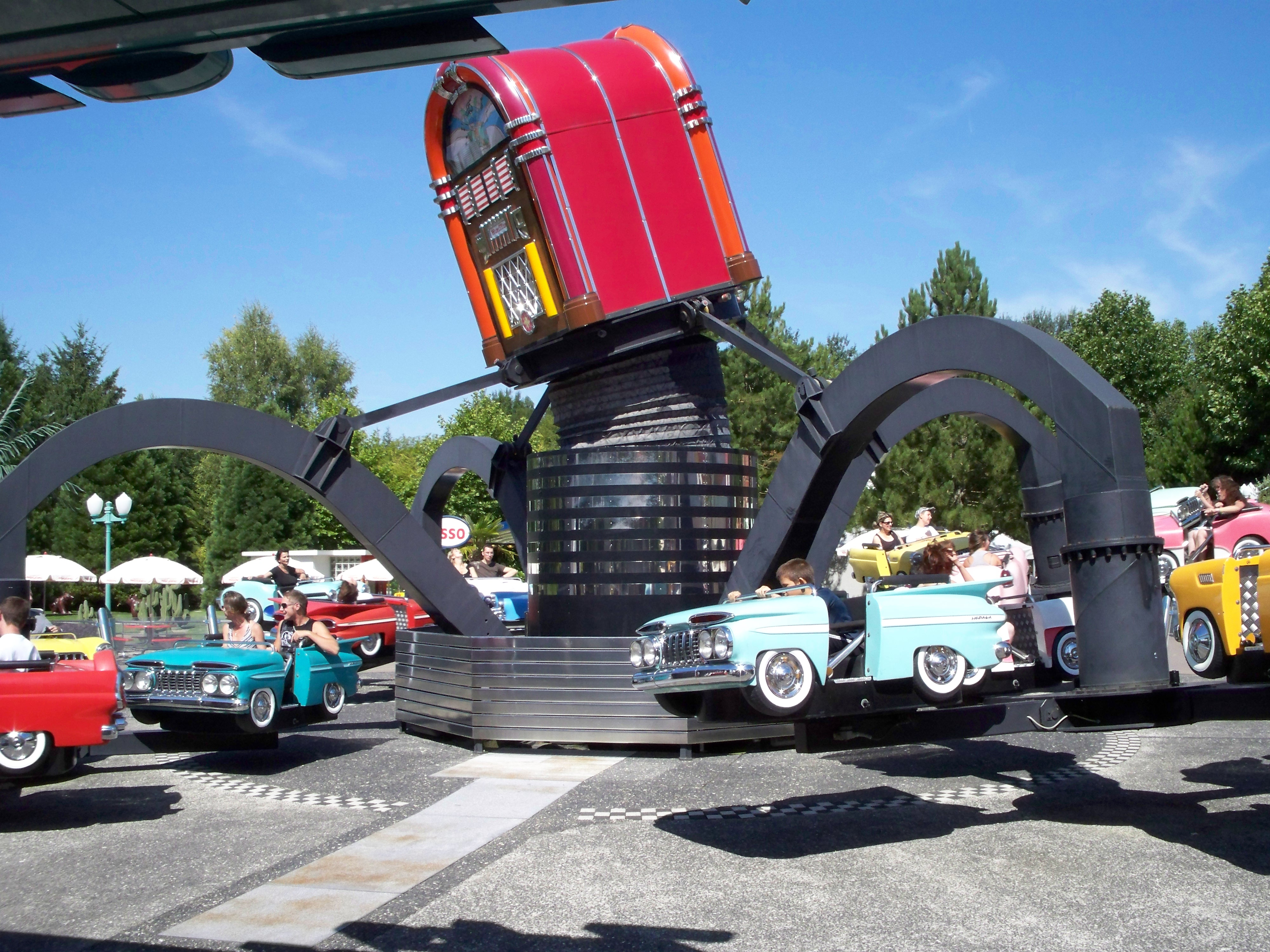
Juke Box

=== Other attractions ===
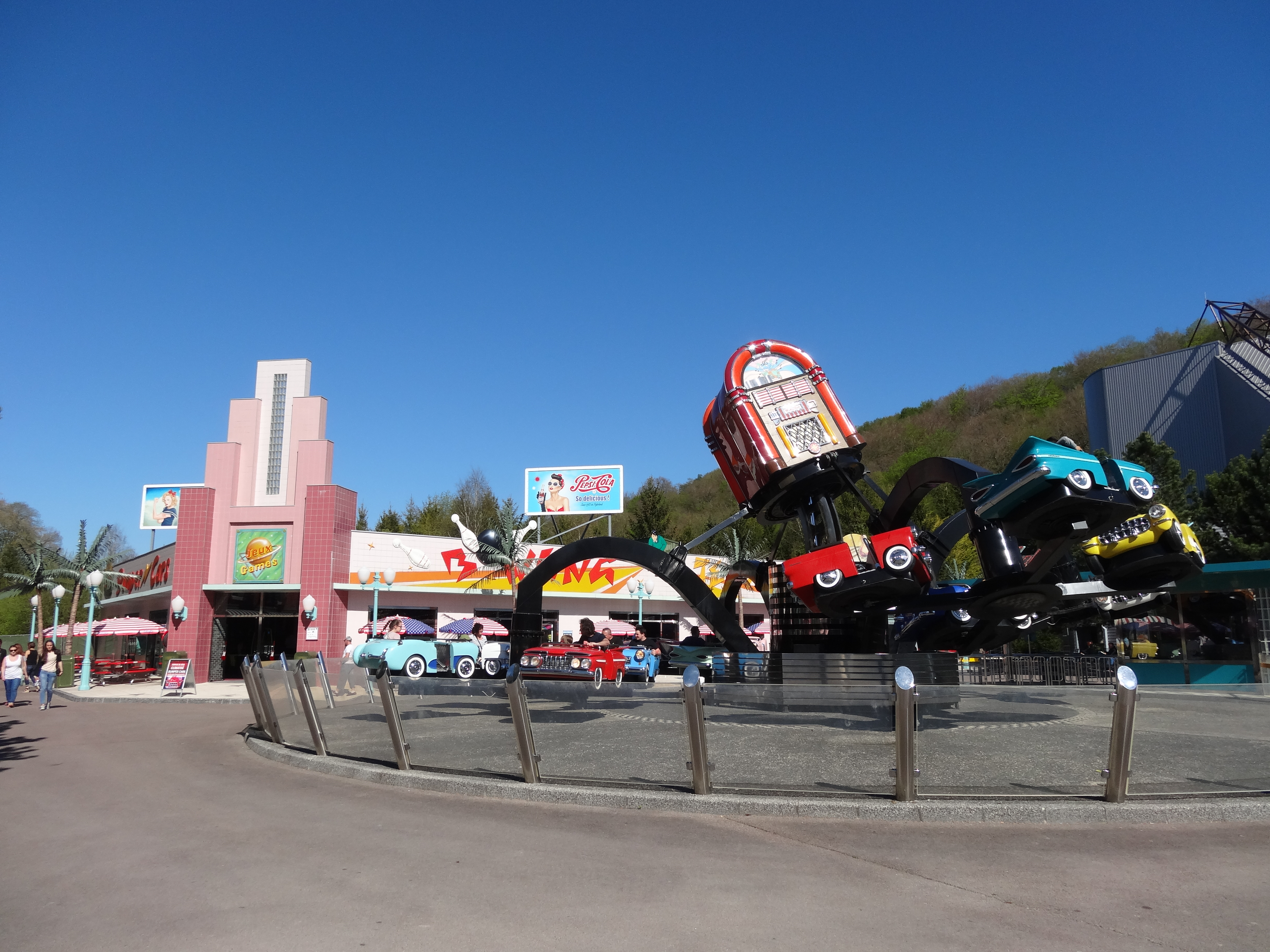
Juke Box and Hollywood Boulevard.

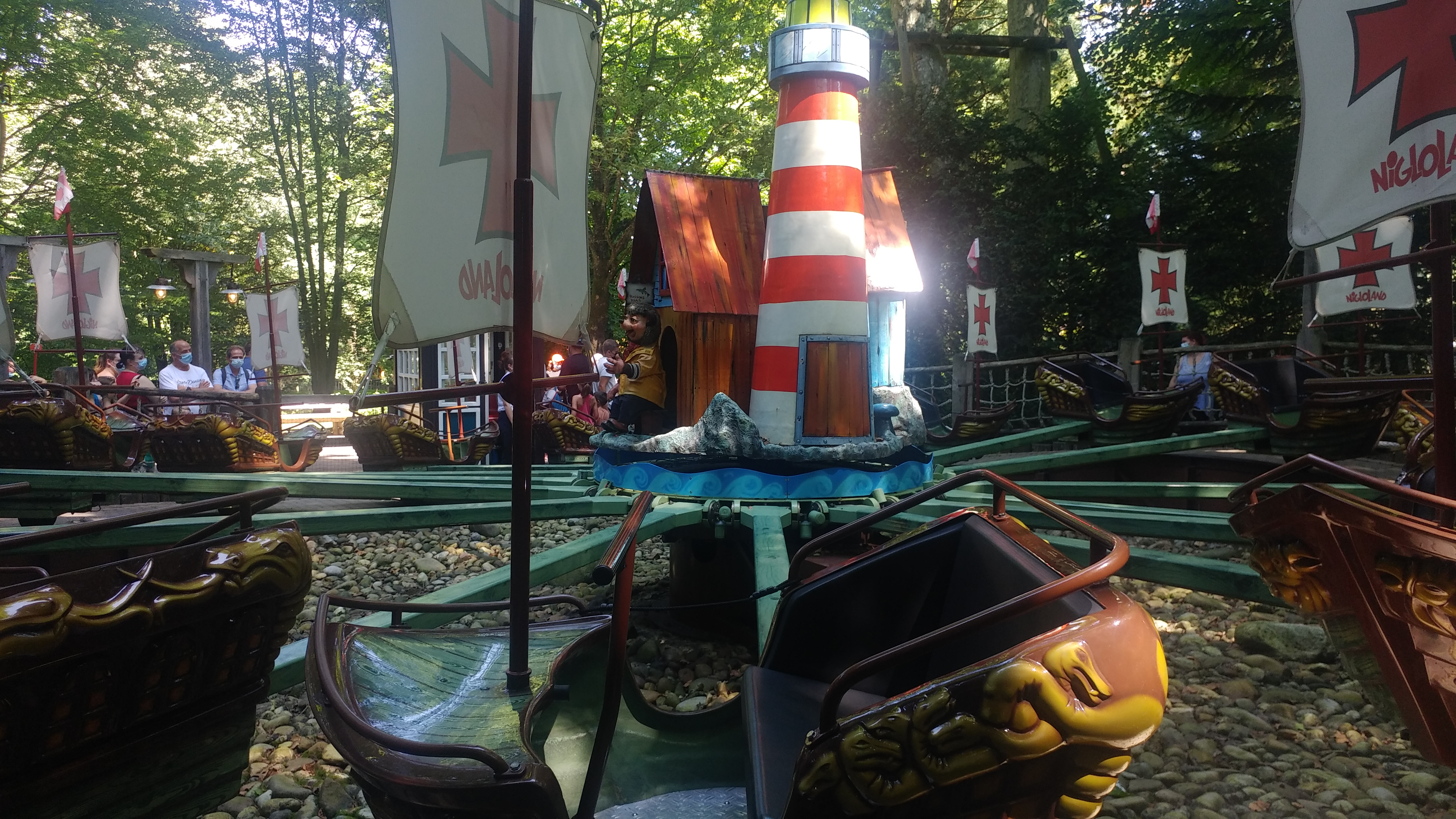
Caravelles de Jacques Cartier.

- Bumper's Cars: bumper cars (2001)
- Caravelles de Jacques Cartier: a Music Express-type ride built by Mack Rides (1990)
- Chevauchée fantastique: galloping horse ride by Soquet (1987)
- Circuit de Nigloland: go-kart circuit themed as a Formula 1 track (1990)
- Dinosaures Aventure: dinosaur-themed ride (2003)
- Dragons volants: dragon-shaped monorail by Severn Lamb (1996)
- Eden Palais: a carousel-salon offering museum, tea room, and cinema space (2019). It includes two attractions: La Route de l'essence (2012) and Le Carrousel (1987)
- Ferme d'Antonin: tractor ride (2008)
- Grande roue: Ferris wheel by Gerstlauer (2009)
- Hérissons de la forêt magique: scenic ride for children (1997)
- Manoir hanté: dark ride, the ride system was built by Mack Rides and the facade by the Belgian company Giant (1994)
- Le voyage en montgolfières: balloon-themed ride by Zamperla (1994). The attraction was bought after the closure of the Toison d'or park. (Renovated in 2022)
- Oil Company and Hollywood Boulevard: games
- P'tit Poucet: tea cup ride (1994). The attraction was bought after the closure of the Toison d'or park.
- Ronde des canards: children's ride by Metallbau Emmeln (2007)
- Route 66: American truck ride for children, Zamperla (1999)
- Tacots 1900: antique car ride by Mack Rides (1987)
- Tour des petits fantômes: junior drop tower by Zierer (2016)
- Train: train ride by Soquet (1987)
- Zabeilles: bee-themed airplane ride by Zierer (2018)

=== Defunct attractions ===
- Planète 180°: planetarium cinema (1987–2009).
- Le Château hanté: walkthrough attraction in the dark punctuated by scenes with mannequins and automatons (1987–2013). The attraction, built since the park's opening in the "wonderful village" near the old entrance and made obsolete by the arrival of the *Manoir hanté in 1994, nevertheless remained in operation for a few years (under the name Le Château médiéval), before seeing its windows redesigned for Halloween and becoming the lair of Jack-o'-lantern.
- Niglogolf: golf (1987–2019)

== Accommodations ==
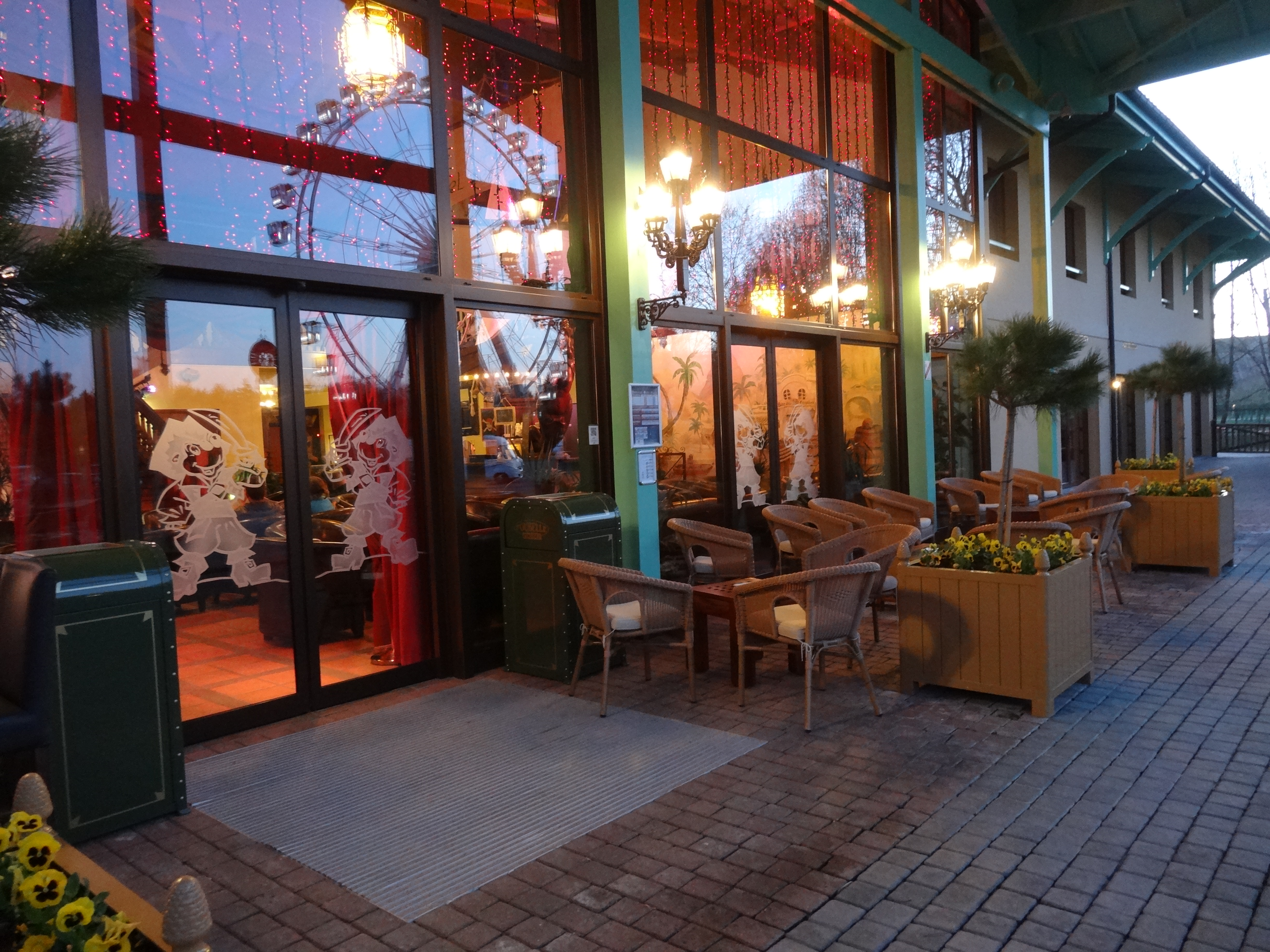
Entrance of the Hôtel des Pirates.

=== The Pirates' Hotel ===
In 2005, Nigloland opened an accommodation, Hôtel des Pirates. Set in an exotic decor, it consists of thirty family rooms that can accommodate up to five adults, a buffet restaurant, a bar, and a performance hall. During the summer, magic shows and face painting stands for children are added as evening entertainment at the hotel. In 2013, the hotel was awarded its fourth star.

== Shows ==
Nigloland offers a show for children, the animatronic show Niglo Show (renovated in 2022).

During the summer, additional animations are added. For Halloween, there are also shows in the park.

In 2022, Nigloland unveiled a new show called Imageen, a sound and light show with fireworks, featuring the voice of Benoît Allemane, and also the Scary Circus.

In 2023, Le printemps de Niglo celebrates Spring and the Easter holiday with its new show Surprise!.

=== Discontinued shows ===
Niglo Circus, a show featuring seals and poodles, took place where Air Meeting now stands.

L'ours and le loup, were educational and playful shows.

Las Vegas Show (2011–2014), a magic show took place in the rock 'n' roll village, hosted by the Kamyléons troupe (awarded with a Mandrake d'or and a Mandrake de cristal).

== Events ==
=== Easter – Le printemps de Niglo ===
At the beginning of the season and during the month of April, Nigloland is decorated with Easter-themed decorations such as rabbits and large chocolate eggs.

In 2023, Nigloland unveils its new event, Le printemps de Niglo celebrating Spring and Easter, featuring an Easter egg hunt for children.

=== Halloween – Nigloween ===
The park celebrates Halloween every year with Nigloween on weekends in October and every day during the All Saints' Day holiday with a magic show, the Metamorphosis of the Werewolf animation, and the Jack-o'-Lantern's Lair course (formerly known as the Haunted Castle), which disappeared in 2013. The park is decorated with thousands of pumpkins, straw boots, flowers, and skeletons.

In 2022, Nigloland unveils a new show Imageen, a sound and light show with fireworks featuring the voice of Benoît Allemane.

== Logos ==
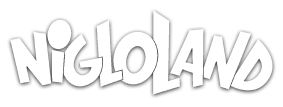
Current logo of the park.
