= Mack Rides =

German manufacturer of amusement rides

Mack Rides GmbH & Co KG
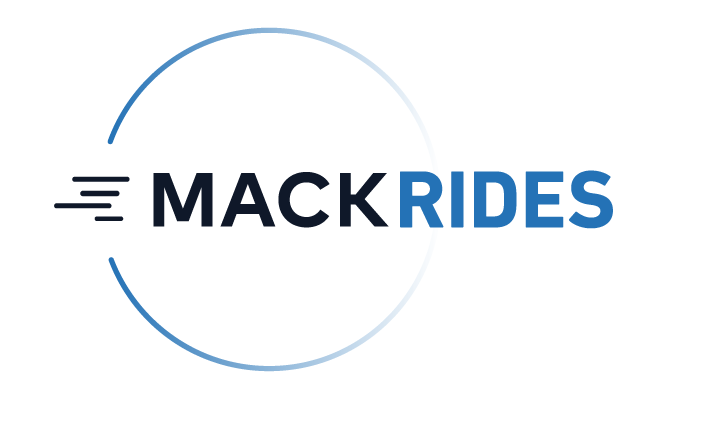
- Type: Private, family-owned
- Industry: Amusement park
- Founded: 1780; 246 years ago
- Founder: Paul Mack
- Headquarters: Waldkirch, Baden-Württemberg, Germany
- Area served: Worldwide
- Products: Roller coasters, water rides and other amusement rides
- Owner: Mack family
- Subsidiaries: Europa-Park
- Website: www.mack-rides.com

Mack Rides GmbH & Co KG, also known simply as Mack Rides, is a German company that designs and constructs amusement rides, based in Waldkirch, Baden-Württemberg. It is one of the world's oldest amusement industry suppliers, and builds many types of rides, including flat rides, dark rides, log flumes, tow boat rides and roller coasters. The family that owns Mack Rides also owns Europa-Park.

== History ==
=== Early history ===
Mack Rides traces its roots back to 1780 when Paul Mack, a young entrepreneur, started building carriages and stagecoaches, as well as other engineering undertakings including managing the town of Waldkirch's water supply. The company was taken over in 1833 by Paul's son Johann, who continued business interests in both carriages and upgrades to water systems.

The third generation was Heinrich Mack I (d.1886), who introduced special transport vehicles including - from 1880 - building organ wagons and caravans for travelling showmen in 1880, commencing the company's involvement in the amusement industry. On Heinrich's death, the business passed in 1886 to his son, Heinrich II.

A workshop fire destroyed the entire business in 1893, and Heinrich II rebuilt a new factory, and grew the market for fairground wagons, becoming a leading manufacturer.

==== Transition to amusement ride construction ====
The fifth generation of the Mack family, Heinrich III, took over the business in 1908, and concentrated on the travelling show business, mostly in residential and transport wagons for the travelling showmen, and then starting to expand into transportable rides for the shows.

In 1921, Heinrich III built the first, transportable, wooden roller coaster. This was followed by other rides, including the "Avus-Bahn" go-kart attraction in 1936. The first wooden bobsled ride followed in 1951 and by 1952 Mack Rides had started increasing its exports of rides to the U.S. market.

=== 1950s–present ===
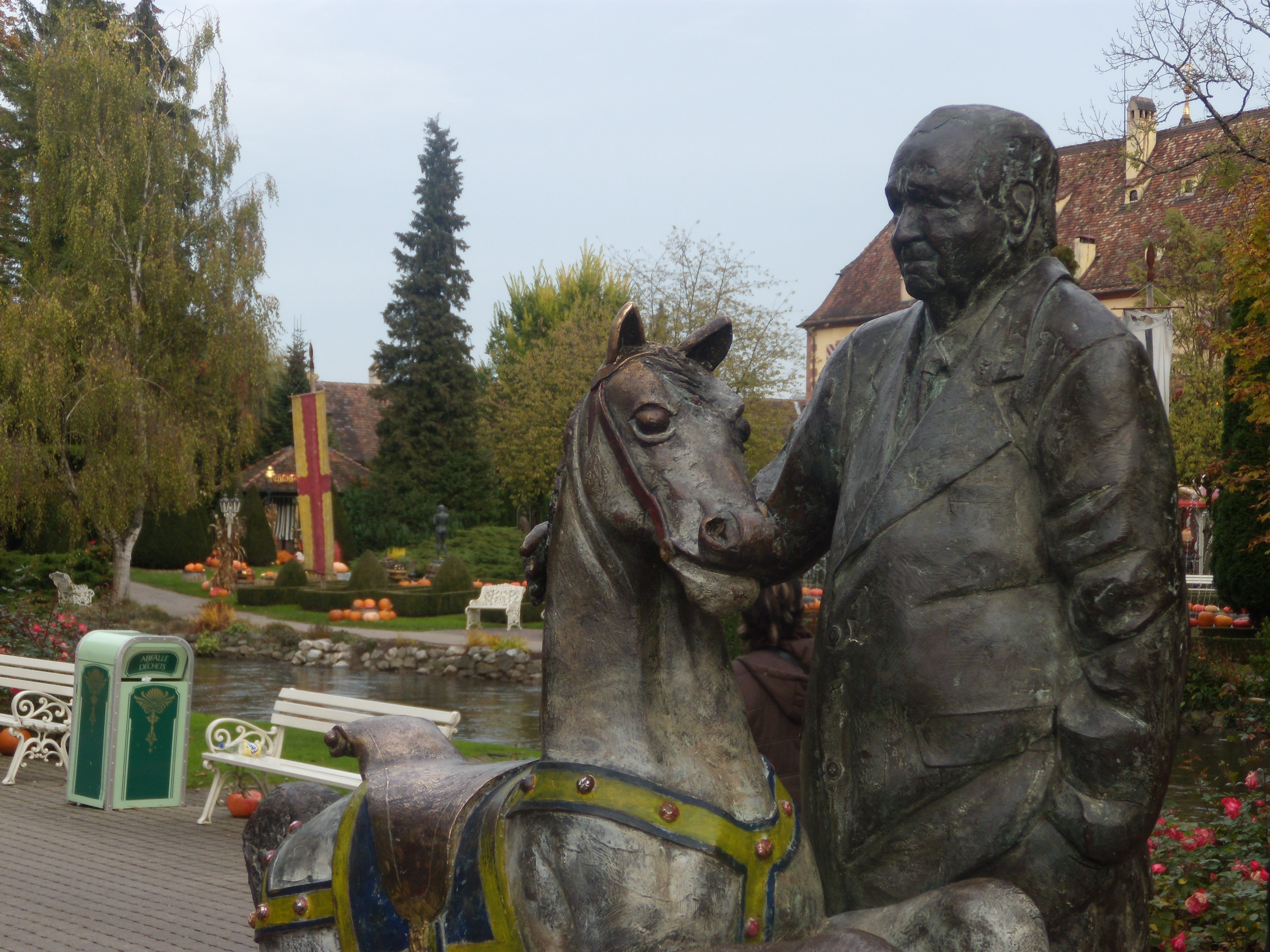
Franz Mack

Franz Mack (1921–2010) took over the family firm in 1958 together with his brothers. In 1972, he and his son Roland (b. 1949), visited the United States, where they were inspired to open a theme park in Germany to serve as an exhibition site for the company's products.

The park, Europa-Park, opened in 1975. It was named after the nearby Europaweiher, a small artificial lake commemorating a 1950 pilot poll in Breisach, in which 95.6% of voters supported European unification.

Mack Rides received consecutive Golden Ticket Awards for Best New Roller Coaster with two of its installations: Voltron Nevera, a multi-launch roller coaster at Europa-Park in Rust, Germany, in 2024, and Stardust Racers, a steel dual-launched roller coaster at Universal Epic Universe in Orlando, Florida, in 2025.

== List of roller coasters ==
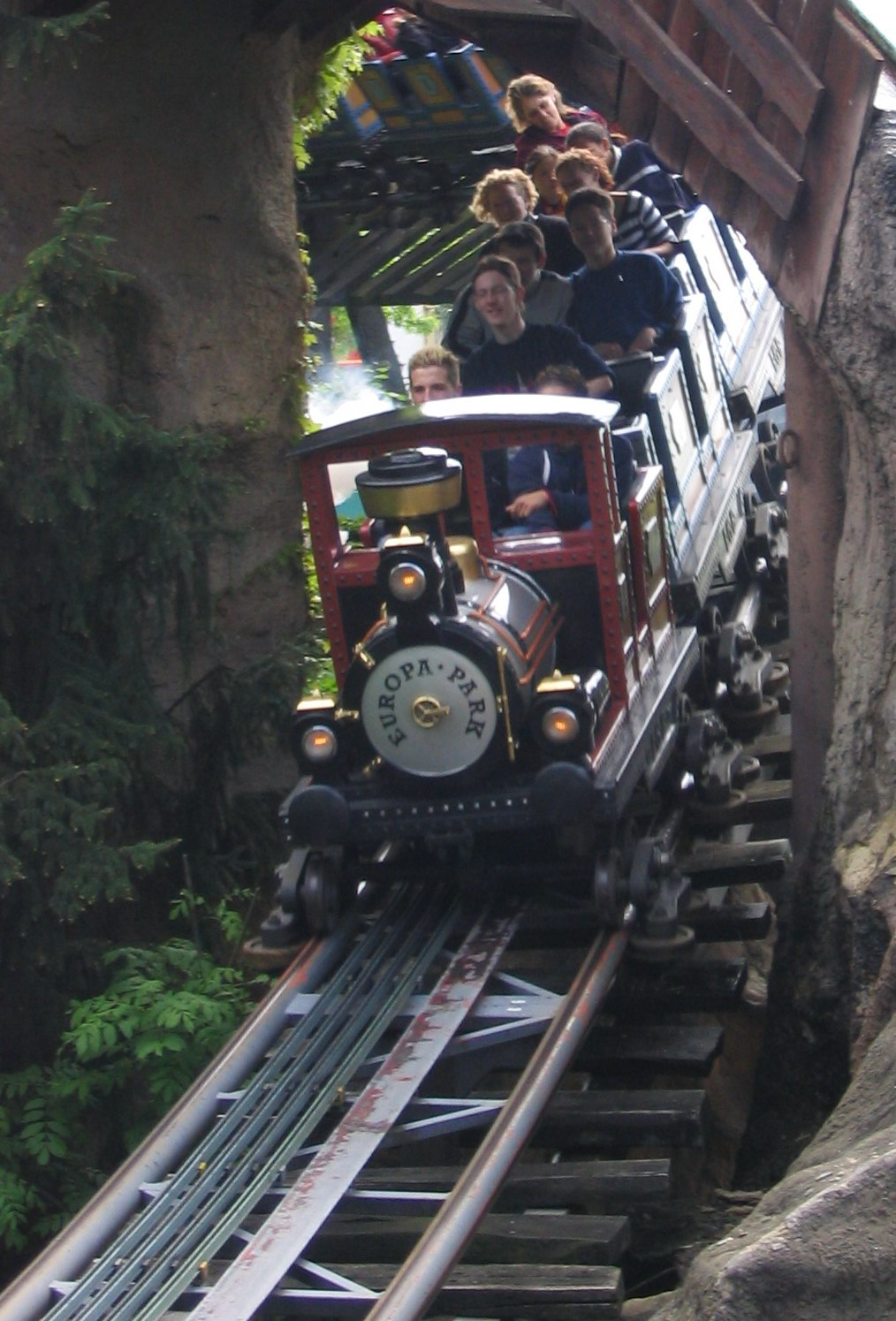
Blauer Enzian roller coaster

As of September 2024, Mack Rides has built 174 roller coasters around the world.

Name	Model	Park	Country	Opened	Status	Ref.
Turmbahn	Unknown	Tivoli Gardens	Denmark	1938	Removed	
Meteor	Unknown	Sportland Pier; Freedom Land USA; Sportland Pier	United States	1966; 1963 to 1965; 1960 to 1961	Removed	
Apache Whirlwind	Powered Coaster	Frontier Village Amusement Park	United States	1976	Removed	
Wizard's Cavern; Formerly Love Bugs; Formerly Broadway Trip	Unknown	Casino Pier; Canadian National Exhibition; Palisades Amusement Park; Cedar Point; Fun Forest Amusement Park	United States	1979; 1972 to 1978; 1966 to 1971; 1964 to 1965; 1962 to 1962	Removed	&
Blauer Enzian	Powered Coaster	Gröna Lund	Sweden	1980	Removed	
Tokaido	Powered Coaster	Ankara Luna Park	Turkey	1980	Operating	
Thunder Run; Formerly Blauer Enzian	Powered Coaster	Canada's Wonderland	Canada	1981	Operating	
Flying Fish; Formerly Space Station Zero	Powered Coaster	Thorpe Park	United Kingdom	1983	Operating	&
Alpenexpress Enzian; Formerly Grottenblitz	Powered Coaster	Europa-Park	Germany	1984	Operating	
Schweizer Bobbahn	Bobsled	Europa-Park	Germany	1985	Operating	
Grottenblitz	Powered Coaster	Heide Park	Germany	1985	Operating	
Odinexpressen	Powered Coaster	Tivoli Gardens	Denmark	1985	Removed	
Little Eagle	Unknown	Broadway Grand Prix; Myrtle Beach Pavilion	United States	Unknown; 1986 to 2006	Removed	
Scorpion Express; Formerly Runaway Train	Powered Coaster	Chessington World of Adventures	United Kingdom	1987	Removed	
Gruvbanan; Formerly Berg-o-dal-banan	Powered Coaster	Skara Sommarland	Sweden	1987	Operating	
Reptilian; Formerly Avalanche	Bobsled	Kings Dominion	United States	1988	Operating	
Electro; Formerly Capitale Express	Unknown	Méga Parc	Canada	1988	Operating	
Avalanche	Bobsled	Blackpool Pleasure Beach	United Kingdom	1988	Operating	
Eurosat - CanCan Coaster; Formerly Eurosat	Gravity Coaster	Europa-Park	Germany	1989	Operating	
Blauer Enzian	Powered Coaster	Freizeit-Land Geiselwind	Germany	1989	Operating	
Idän Pikajuna	Powered Coaster	Tykkimäki	Finland	1989	Removed	
Pikajuna; Formerly City Express	Powered Coaster	Linnanmäki	Finland	1990	Operating	
Munich Autobahn	Bobsled	Kobe Portopialand	Japan	1991	Removed	
Rexplorer; Formerly Explorer	Powered Coaster	Mirabilandia	Italy	1992	Operating	
Runaway Mine Train	Powered Coaster	Alton Towers	United Kingdom	1992	Operating	
Gold Mine Train	Powered Coaster	Nigloland	France	1992	Operating	
Spreeblitz; Formerly Le Dragon des Sortilèges	Powered Coaster	Spreepark; Mirapolis	Germany	1992	Closed	
Kansas City-Express; Formerly Blauer Enzian	Powered Coaster	Fränkisches Wunderland; Movie Park Germany; Tivoli Karolinelund	Germany	1993; 1987 to 1991; Unknown	Removed	
Bobbahn; Formerly Schweizer Bobbahn	Bobsled	Heide Park	Germany	1994	Operating	
Gran Montserrat	Unknown	Parque Espana-Shima Spain Village	Japan	1994	Operating	
Wild Mouse	Wilde Maus	Nagashima Spa Land	Japan	1996	Operating	&
Wild Mouse	Wilde Maus	Magic Land	Egypt	1996	Removed	
Runaway Train	Powered Coaster	Elitch Gardens	United States	1996	Removed	
Euro-Mir	Spinning Coaster	Europa-Park	Germany	1997	Operating	
Dragen	Powered Coaster	Legoland Billund	Denmark	1997	Operating	
Blauer Enzian	Powered Coaster	Toshimaen	Japan	1997	Removed	
Gletscherblitz	Powered Coaster	Steinwasen Park	Germany	1998	Operating	
Journey to Atlantis	Water Coaster	SeaWorld Orlando	United States	1998	Operating	
Speedy Bob	Wilde Maus	Bobbejaanland	Belgium	1998	Operating	&
Taunusblitz	Wilde Maus	Taunus Wunderland	Germany	1999	Operating	
Matterhorn Blitz	Wilde Maus	Europa-Park	Germany	1999	Operating	
The Fly	Wilde Maus	Canada's Wonderland	Canada	1999	Operating	
Wild Mouse	Wilde Maus	Hersheypark	United States	1999	Operating	
Ghost Chasers; Formerly Mad Manor; Formerly Tom and Jerry's Mouse in the House	Wilde Maus	Movie Park Germany	Germany	2000	Operating	
Spatiale Expérience	Gravity Coaster	Nigloland	France	1998	Operating	
Water Rollercoaster Poseidon	Water Coaster	Europa-Park	Germany	2000	Operating	
Bob Express	Powered Coaster	Bobbejaanland	Belgium	2000	Operating	
Goofy's Sky School; Formerly Mulholland Madness	Wilde Maus	Disney California Adventure	United States	2001	Operating	
Trace Du Hourra	Bobsled	Parc Astérix	France	2001	Operating	
Technic Coaster	Wilde Maus	Legoland California	United States	2001	Operating	
Das Große LEGO Rennen; Formerly Project X - Test Strecke	Wilde Maus	Legoland Deutschland	Germany	2002	Operating	
Ricochet	Wilde Maus	Carowinds	United States	2002	Operating	
Apple Zapple; Formerly Ricochet	Wilde Maus	Kings Dominion	United States	2002	Operating	
X-treme Racers	Wilde Maus	Legoland Billund	Denmark	2002	Operating	
Scooby-Doo Spooky Coaster	Wilde Maus	Warner Bros. Movie World	Australia	2002	Operating	
SuperSplash	SuperSplash	TusenFryd	Norway	2003	Operating	
Sand Serpent; Formerly Cheetah Chase; Formerly Wild Maus; Formerly Izzy	Wilde Maus	Busch Gardens Tampa; Busch Gardens Williamsburg	United States	2004; 1996 to 2003	Removed	
Draak	Powered Coaster	Plopsaland	Belgium	2004	Operating	
Tulireki	E-Motion Coaster	Linnanmäki	Finland	2004	Operating	
Journey to Atlantis	Water Coaster	SeaWorld San Diego	United States	2004	Operating	
Atlantica SuperSplash	SuperSplash	Europa-Park	Germany	2005	Operating	
Dynamite Express	Powered Coaster	Drievliet	Netherlands	2005	Operating	
Reaper, Drop ride to doom!	E-Motion Coaster	Amsterdam Dungeon	Netherlands	2005	Removed	
Run A Way Mine Train	Powered Coaster	Gold Reef City	South Africa	Estimated 2005	Operating	
Montanha Russa	Water Coaster	Aquashow Family Park	Portugal	2006	Operating	
Pegasus - The YoungStar Coaster	YoungSTAR Coaster	Europa-Park	Germany	2006	Operating	
Expreso Minero	Powered Coaster	Parque Plaza Sesamo	Mexico	2006	Operating	
Schlitt'Express	Wilde Maus	Nigloland	France	2007	Operating	
Journey to Atlantis	SuperSplash	SeaWorld San Antonio	United States	2007	Operating	
Sierra Sidewinder	Spinning Coaster	Knott's Berry Farm	United States	2007	Operating	
Armada Invencible; Formerly Caribbean Splash	SuperSplash	Formosan Aboriginal Culture Village	Taiwan	2008	Operating	
Götterblitz	YoungSTAR Coaster	Familypark	Austria	2008	Operating	
The Dark Knight	Wilde Maus	Six Flags Great Adventure	United States	2008	Operating	
The Dark Knight	Wilde Maus	Six Flags Great America	United States	2008	Operating	
The Dark Knight	Wilde Maus	Six Flags Mexico; Six Flags New England	Mexico	2009; 2008	Operating	
Eurospeed; Formerly Rothaarblitz	Powered Coaster	Europark; Panorama Park	France	2009; 1982 to 2007	Operating	
Blue Fire	Launch Coaster	Europa-Park	Germany	2009	Operating	
Vértigo; Formerly Speedy Bob	Wilde Maus	Parque de Atracciones de Madrid; Bobbejaanland	Spain	2009; 1998 to 2008	Operating	
Correcaminos Bip, Bip	YoungSTAR Coaster	Parque Warner Madrid	Spain	2009	Operating	
Young Star Coaster	YoungSTAR Coaster	Chimelong Paradise	China	2010	Operating	
Space Fantasy - The Ride; Formerly Kyary Pamyu Pamyu XR Ride	Spinning Coaster	Universal Studios Japan	Japan	2010	Operating	
Twist	Spinning Coaster	Le Pal	France	2011	Operating	
Wilde Maus; Formerly Zig Zag	Wilde Maus	Freizeit-Land Geiselwind; Sommerland Syd; Attractiepark Toverland; Walygator Parc	Germany	2011; 2010; 2004; 2003	Removed	
Skatteøen	Water Coaster	Djurs Sommerland	Denmark	2011	Operating	
Tiger Express; Formerly Flying Dutchman Gold Mine	Wilde Maus	La Mer de Sable; Walibi Holland	France	2011; 2000 to 2010	Operating	
Great Lego Race; Formerly Project X Formerly Jungle Coaster	Wilde Maus	Legoland Florida; Legoland Windsor	United States	2011; 2004 to 2009	Operating	
Vilde Mus	Wilde Maus	Bakken	Denmark	2012	Operating	
Manta	Launch Coaster	SeaWorld San Diego	United States	2012	Operating	
Arctic Blast	Powered Coaster	Ocean Park Hong Kong	Hong Kong	2012	Operating	
Great Lego Race; Formerly Project X	Wilde Maus	Legoland Malaysia	Malaysia	2012	Operating	
Dwervelwind; Formerly d'wervelwind	Spinning Coaster	Attractiepark Toverland	Netherlands	2012	Operating	
Storm	Mega Coaster	Etnaland	Italy	2013	Operating	
Coast Rider	Wilde Maus	Knott's Berry Farm	United States	2013	Operating	
Storm Coaster	Water Coaster	Sea World	Australia	2013	Operating	
Dragon	Launch Coaster	Sochi Park Adventureland	Russia	2014	Operating	
Sharolet	Wilde Maus	Sochi Park Adventureland	Russia	2014	Operating	
Wild Mouse	Wilde Maus	Antibes Land; Walygator Parc; Expoland	France	2014; 2008 to 2013; 1996 to 2007	Operating	
Walrus Splash	SuperSplash	Chimelong Ocean Kingdom	China	2014	Operating	
Polar Explorer	Water Coaster	Chimelong Ocean Kingdom	China	2014	Operating	
Alpina Blitz	Mega Coaster	Nigloland	France	2014	Operating	
Helix	Launch Coaster	Liseberg	Sweden	2014	Operating	
Battle of Blue Fire	Launch Coaster	Quancheng Euro Park	China	2014	Operating	
ARTHUR	Inverted Powered Coaster	Europa-Park	Germany	2014	Operating	
Velikoluksky Miasokombinat	Launch Coaster	Wonder Island	Russia	2015	Operating	
Turbulence	Spinning Coaster	Adventureland	United States	2015	Operating	
Miniwah	Powered Coaster	Freizeitpark Plohn	Germany	2015	Operating	
Flash; Formerly Lightning	Hyper Coaster	Lewa Adventure	China	2016	Operating	
Lost Gravity	BigDipper	Walibi Holland	Netherlands	2016	Operating	
Flight of the Hippogriff	YoungSTAR Coaster	Universal Studios Hollywood	United States	2016	Operating	
Dragon Express	Spinning Coaster	Oriental Neverland	China	2016	Operating	
Pulsar	PowerSplash	Walibi Belgium	Belgium	2016	Operating	
Cobra's Curse	Spinning Coaster	Busch Gardens Tampa	United States	2016	Operating	
Spider-Man: Doc Ock's Revenge	Spinning Coaster	IMG Worlds of Adventure	United Arab Emirates	2016	Operating	
Velociraptor	Launch Coaster	IMG Worlds of Adventure	United Arab Emirates	2016	Operating	
Capitol Bullet Train	Launch Coaster	Motiongate Dubai	United Arab Emirates	2017	Operating	
Dragon Gliders	Inverted Powered Coaster	Motiongate Dubai	United Arab Emirates	2017	Operating	
Star Trek: Operation Enterprise	Launch Coaster	Movie Park Germany	Germany	2017	Operating	
DC Rivals HyperCoaster	Hyper Coaster	Warner Bros. Movie World	Australia	2017	Operating	
Dancing Oscar	Spinning Coaster	Shinhwa Theme Park	South Korea	2017	Operating	
Slinky Dog Dash	Launch Coaster	Disney's Hollywood Studios	United States	2018	Operating	
Icon	Launch Coaster	Blackpool Pleasure Beach	United Kingdom	2018	Operating	
Time Traveler	Xtreme Spinning Coaster	Silver Dollar City	United States	2018	Operating	
Hyper Coaster	Hyper Coaster	Land of Legends Theme Park	Turkey	2018	Operating	
Launch Coaster	Launch Coaster	Colourful Yunnan Happy World	China	2018	Operating	
Tiger Leaping Gorge	SuperSplash	Colourful Yunnan Happy World	China	2018	Operating	
Kraken's Revenge	Water Coaster	Desaru Coast Adventure Waterpark	Malaysia	2018	Operating	
Power Splash	PowerSplash	Happy Valley Shenzhen	China	2019	Operating	
Dynamite	BigDipper	Freizeitpark Plohn	Germany	2019	Operating	
Copperhead Strike	Launch Coaster	Carowinds	United States	2019	Operating	
Steam Racers	Launch Coaster	Wuxi Sunac Land	China	2019	Operating	
Gods of Egypt - Battle for Eternity	Powered Coaster	Lionsgate Entertainment World	China	2019	Operating	
Mælkevejen	Powered Coaster	Tivoli Gardens	Denmark	2019	Operating	
Max & Moritz	Powered Coaster	Efteling	Netherlands	2020	Operating	
Storm Chaser	Spinning Coaster	Paultons Park	United Kingdom	2021	Operating	
Twin Spin	Spinning Coaster	Enchanted Kingdom	Philippines	2021	Operating	
Krampus Expédition	Water Coaster	Nigloland	France	2021	Operating	
The Ride to Happiness	Xtreme Spinning Coaster	Plopsaland	Belgium	2021	Operating	
Blu Power	PowerSplash	Tetysblu Theme Park	Kazakhstan	2021	Operating	
Rockin' Blu	Spinning Coaster	Tetysblu Theme Park	Kazakhstan	2021	Operating	
Flight of the Hippogriff	YoungSTAR Coaster	Universal Studios Beijing	China	2021	Operating	
Jurassic Flyers	Inverted Powered Coaster	Universal Studios Beijing	China	2021	Operating	
Steel Taipan	Launch Coaster	Dreamworld	Australia	2021	Operating	
Blue Fire	Launch Coaster	Xuzhou Paradise	China	2021	Operating	
Giant Digger	Launch Coaster	Lotte's Magic Forest	South Korea	2022	Operating	
Giant Splash	PowerSplash	Lotte's Magic Forest	South Korea	2022	Operating	
T-Rex Family Coaster	Powered Coaster	Djurs Sommerland	Denmark	2022	Operating	
Carrara	Powered Coaster	Mandoria	Poland	2022	Operating	
Beyond the Cloud	Launch Coaster	Suzhou Amusement Land Forest World	China	2022	Operating	
Aquaman: Power Wave	PowerSplash	Six Flags Over Texas	United States	2023	Operating	
Fjord Explorer	Water Coaster	Le Pal	France	2024	Operating	
Voltron Nevera	Stryker Coaster	Europa-Park	Germany	2024	Operating	
Alpenexpress Enzian	Powered Coaster	Europa-Park	Germany	2024	Operating	
Hyperia	Hyper Coaster	Thorpe Park Resort	United Kingdom	2024	Operating	
Gobbi Express; Formerly Galaxie Express	Powered Coaster	Taunus Wunderland; Space Center	Germany	2024; 2003 to 2004	Operating	
Helios	BigDipper	Fantasiana	Austria	2025	Operating	
Stardust Racers	Dueling Launch Coaster	Universal Epic Universe	United States	2025	Operating	
Curse of the Werewolf	Spinning Coaster	Universal Epic Universe	United States	2025	Operating	
Wiener Looping	BigDipper	Wiener Prater	Austria	2025	Operating	
Flash Coaster	Launch Coaster	Aquashow Family Park	Portugal	2025	Operating	
Saw Mill Falls	Water Coaster	Six Flags Qiddiya City	Saudi Arabia	2025	Operating	
Jurassic World: Cretaceous Coaster	YoungSTAR Coaster	Universal Kids Resort	United States	2026	Operating	
Unknown	Water Coaster	Happy Valley Xi'an	China	2026	Under construction	
Unknown	BigDipper	Sun World Bà Nà Hills	Vietnam	2026	Under construction	
Dønnerwind	Water Coaster	Freizeitpark Plohn	Germany	2026	Under construction	
Bakunawa	Xtreme Spinning Coaster	Six Flags Great Adventure	United States	2027	Under construction	
Miner's Mountain Express	Family Mine Train	Silver Dollar City	United States	2027	Under construction	
Cannonball!	Water Coaster	Holiday World	United States	2027	Under construction	
Serpent’s Curse	Water Coaster	Paultons Park	United Kingdom	2027	Under construction	
Unknown	Xtreme Spinning Coaster	Plopsaland Deutschland	Germany	2028	Under construction	
Unknown	PowerSplash	Real Madrid World	United Arab Emirates	Unknown	In storage	
Unknown	Hyper Coaster	Real Madrid World	United Arab Emirates	Unknown	In storage	
Unknown	PowerSplash	Sunac Cultural Tourism City	China	TBD	In Storage	
Unknown	Hyper Coaster	Sunac Cultural Tourism City	China	TBD	In Storage	

== List of other attractions ==
Name	Model	Park	Country	Opened	Status	Ref.
Blanche-Neige et les Sept Nains	Dark Ride	Disneyland Park	France	1992	Operating	
Whale Adventures – Northern Lights	Interactive Boat Ride	Europa-Park	Germany	2010	Operating	
Tiroler Log Flume	Log Flume	Europa-Park	Germany	1978	Operating	
Pirate Adventure	Free-Flow Boat Ride	Drayton Manor Theme Park	United Kingdom	1990	Closed	
Atlantis Submarine Voyage	Submarine Dark Ride	Legoland Windsor	United Kingdom	2011	Operating	
Around the World in 80 Days	Dark Ride	Alton Towers	United Kingdom	1981	Removed	
Battle Galleons	Interactive Boat Ride	Alton Towers	United Kingdom	2008	Operating	
Charlie and the Chocolate Factory: The Ride	Dark Ride	Alton Towers	United Kingdom	2006	Removed	
Duel - The Haunted House Strikes Back!	Dark Ride	Alton Towers	United Kingdom	2003	Removed	
Marauder's Mayhem	Tea Cups	Alton Towers	United Kingdom	1986	Operating	
In the Night Garden Magical Boat Ride	Free-Flow Boat Ride	Alton Towers	United Kingdom	2014	Operating	
The Flume	Log Flume	Alton Towers	United Kingdom	1981	Removed	
Battle Boats	Interactive Boat Ride	Sea World	Australia	2010	Operating	
Loggers Leap	Log Flume	Thorpe Park	United Kingdom	1989	Removed	
Rocky Express	Sea Storm Ride	Thorpe Park	United Kingdom	1989	Closed	
River Battle	Interactive Boat Ride	Dollywood	United States	2008	Removed	
Tiger Rock	Log Flume	Chessington World of Adventures	United Kingdom	1987	Operating	
Safari Skyway	Monorail	Chessington World of Adventures	United Kingdom	1986	Removed	
Seastorm	Sea Storm Ride	Chessington World of Adventures	United Kingdom	1995	Operating	
Sea Dragons	Spinning Boat Ride	Chessington World of Adventures	United Kingdom	2004	Operating	
Tomb Blaster	Interactive Dark Ride	Chessington World of Adventures	United Kingdom	2002	Operating	
Dudley Do-Right's Ripsaw Falls	Log Flume	Universal's Islands of Adventure	United States	1999	Operating	
Storm Force Accelatron	Tea Cups	Universal's Islands of Adventure	United States	2000	Operating	
Cannonball Express	Musik Express	Great Escape	United States	1974	Operating	
Musik Express	Superbob/Musik Express	Lagoon	United States	1982	Operating	
Aqua Twist	Twist 'n' Splash	La Ronde	Canada	2013	Operating	
Flash: Speed Force	Music Express	Six Flags Magic Mountain	United States	2014	Operating	
The Penguin	Twist 'n' Splash	Six Flags Discovery Kingdom	United States	2014	Operating	
Tsunami Soaker	Twist 'n' Splash	Six Flags St. Louis	United States	2014	Operating	
Buccaneer Battle	Interactive Boat Ride	Six Flags Great America	United States	2009	Removed	
Expreso Musical	Music Express	Six Flags México	Mexico	Unknown	Operating	
Carnaval Festival	Dark Ride	Efteling	Netherlands	1984	Operating	
Monsieur Cannibale	Tea Cups	Efteling	Netherlands	1988	Closed	
Sirocco	Tea Cups	Efteling	Netherlands	2022	Operating	
De Oude Tufferbaan	Tracked Ride	Efteling	Netherlands	1984	Operating	
Expedition Nautilus	Twist 'n' Splash	Attractiepark Slagharen	Netherlands	2013	Operating	
Wild West Adventure	Free-Flow Boat Ride	Attractiepark Slagharen	Netherlands	2001	Operating	
Wild Waterval	Log Flume	Avonturenpark Hellendoorn	Netherlands	1982	Operating	
Backstroke	Log Flume	Attractiepark Toverland	Netherlands	2004	Operating	
Crazy River	Log Flume	Walibi Holland	Netherlands	1994	Operating	
Rimbula River	Free-Flow Boat Ride	Wildlands Adventure Zoo Emmen	Netherlands	2016	Operating	
Koffietassen	Tea Cups	Bellewaerde	Belgium	1989	Operating	
De Boomstammetjes	Log Flume	Plopsaland	Belgium	1989	Operating	
Koffiekopjes	Tea Cups	Plopsaland	Belgium	2003	Operating	
Kaatje zoekt Eendje	Tow Boat Ride	Plopsaland	Belgium	2001	Operating	
Storm op Zee	Sea Storm Ride	Plopsaland	Belgium	2001	Operating	
De Tractors	Unknown	Plopsaland	Belgium	2002	Operating	
Wickie The Battle	Interactive Boat Ride	Plopsaland	Belgium	2013	Operating	
Flash Back	Log Flume	Walibi Belgium	Belgium	1995	Operating	
Angkor	Interactive Boat Ride	PortAventura Park	Spain	2014	Operating	
Alligator Baie	Interactive Boat Ride	Le Pal	France	2014	Operating	
The Quest for Chi	Interactive Boat Ride	Legoland Florida	United States	Unknown	Operating	
Käpt'n Nicks Piratenschlacht	Interactive Boat Ride	Legoland Deutschland	Germany	2007	Operating	
Pirate Splash Battle	Interactive Boat Ride	Legoland Billund	Denmark	Unknown	Operating	
Tom & Huck's River Blast	Interactive Boat Ride	Silver Dollar City	United States	2010	Operating	
ToPiLauLa-Schlacht	Interactive Boat Ride	Heide Park	Germany	2010	Operating	
The Pirate Revenge	Twist 'n' Splash	Fantasilandia	Chile	2014	Operating	
SpongeBob's Splash Bash	Twist 'n' Splash	Blackpool Pleasure Beach	United Kingdom	2011	Operating	
Battle of the Pirates	Twist 'n' Splash	Chimelong Ocean Kingdom	China	Unknown	Operating	
Pirates Attack	Interactive Boat Ride	Fraispertuis City	France	2011	Operating	
Wasserschlacht im Reich des T-Rex	Interactive Boat Ride	Rasti-Land	Germany	2007	Operating	
Storm in a Teacup	Tea Cups	Thorpe Park	United Kingdom	1986	Operating	
Tiger Rock	Log Flume	Chessington World of Adventures	United Kingdom	2018	Operating	
Alton Towers Dungeon	Dark Ride	Alton Towers	United Kingdom	2019	Operating	
Grampy Rabbit's Sailing Club	Spinning Boat Ride	Paultons Park	United Kingdom	2018	Operating	
Snoopy's Junction	Train Ride	Kings Island	United States	1982	Operating	
Abenteuer Atlantis	Interactive Dark Ride	Europa-Park	Germany	2007	Operating	
Geisterschloss	Dark Ride	Europa-Park	Germany	1982	Operating	
Madame Freudenreichs Curiosités	Dark Ride	Europa-Park	Germany	1994	Operating	
Piccolo Mondo	Dark Ride	Europa-Park	Germany	1982	Operating	
Schlittenfahrt Schneeflöckchen	Dark Ride	Europa-Park	Germany	1998	Operating	
Der fliegende Holländer	Spinning Boat Ride	Europa-Park	Germany	1982	Operating	
Feria Swing	Matterhorn	Europa-Park	Germany	1994	Operating	
Jungfrau-Gletscherflieger	Polyp	Europa-Park	Germany	1989	Operating	
Koffiekopjes	Tea Cups	Europa-Park	Germany	1985	Operating	
Roter Baron	Spinning Plane Ride	Europa-Park	Germany	1980	Operating	
Sheep Rock	Spinning Boat Ride	Europa-Park	Germany	2016	Operating	
Spinning Dragons	Spinning Ride	Europa-Park	Germany	2016	Operating	
Jim Knopf - Reise durch Lummerland	Tracked Ride	Europa-Park	Germany	1977	Operating	
Lada-Autodrom	Tracked Ride	Europa-Park	Germany	1987	Operating	
Silverstone-Piste	Tracked Ride	Europa-Park	Germany	1975	Operating	
Wichtelhausen	Tracked Ride	Europa-Park	Germany	1975	Operating	
Jolly Buccaneer	Spinning Boat Ride	Drayton Manor Theme Park	United Kingdom	1992	Operating	
Elfenfahrt	Free-Flow Boat Ride	Europa-Park	Germany	1979	Operating	
Euro-Tower	Observation Tower	Europa-Park	Germany	1983	Operating	
Phantom Fantasia	Dark Ride	Thorpe Park	United Kingdom	1983	Removed	
The Backyardians' Pirate Treasure	Spinning Boat Ride	Blackpool Pleasure Beach	United Kingdom	1999	Operating	
Marionetten-Bootsfahrt	Free-Flow Boat Ride	Europa-Park	Germany	1992	Operating	
Tales Of The Coast	Free-Flow Boat Ride	Pleasurewood Hills	United Kingdom	1983	Removed	
Fisketuren	Spinning Boat Ride	Liseberg	Sweden	1988	Operating	
Kaffekoppen	Tea Cups	Liseberg	Sweden	1985	Operating	
Kaninresan	Free-Flow Boat Ride	Liseberg	Sweden	2001	Operating	
Den Flyvende Kuffert	Dark Ride	Tivoli Gardens	Denmark	1993	Operating	
Minen	Free-Flow Boat Ride	Tivoli Gardens	Denmark	2003	Operating	
Tekopparna	Tea Cups	Gröna Lund	Sweden	2008	Operating	
Kahvikuppikaruselli	Tea Cups	Linnanmäki	Finland	2002	Operating	
Floßfahrt	Tow Boat Ride	Heide Park	Germany	1978	Operating	
Käpt'ns Törn	Free-Flow Boat Ride	Heide Park	Germany	1997	Operating	
Wildwasserbahn	Log Flume	Heide Park	Germany	1980	Operating	
Oldtimer	Tracked Ride	Heide Park	Germany	1978	Operating	
Koggenfahrt	Spinning Boat Ride	Heide Park	Germany	1982	Removed	
Sea Storm	SeaStorm	Fantasy Island	United Kingdom	2017	Operating	
Fyre Drill	Interactive Boat Ride	Universal Epic Universe	United States	2025	Operating	
