= Alpina Blitz =

Roller coaster in Dolancourt, France

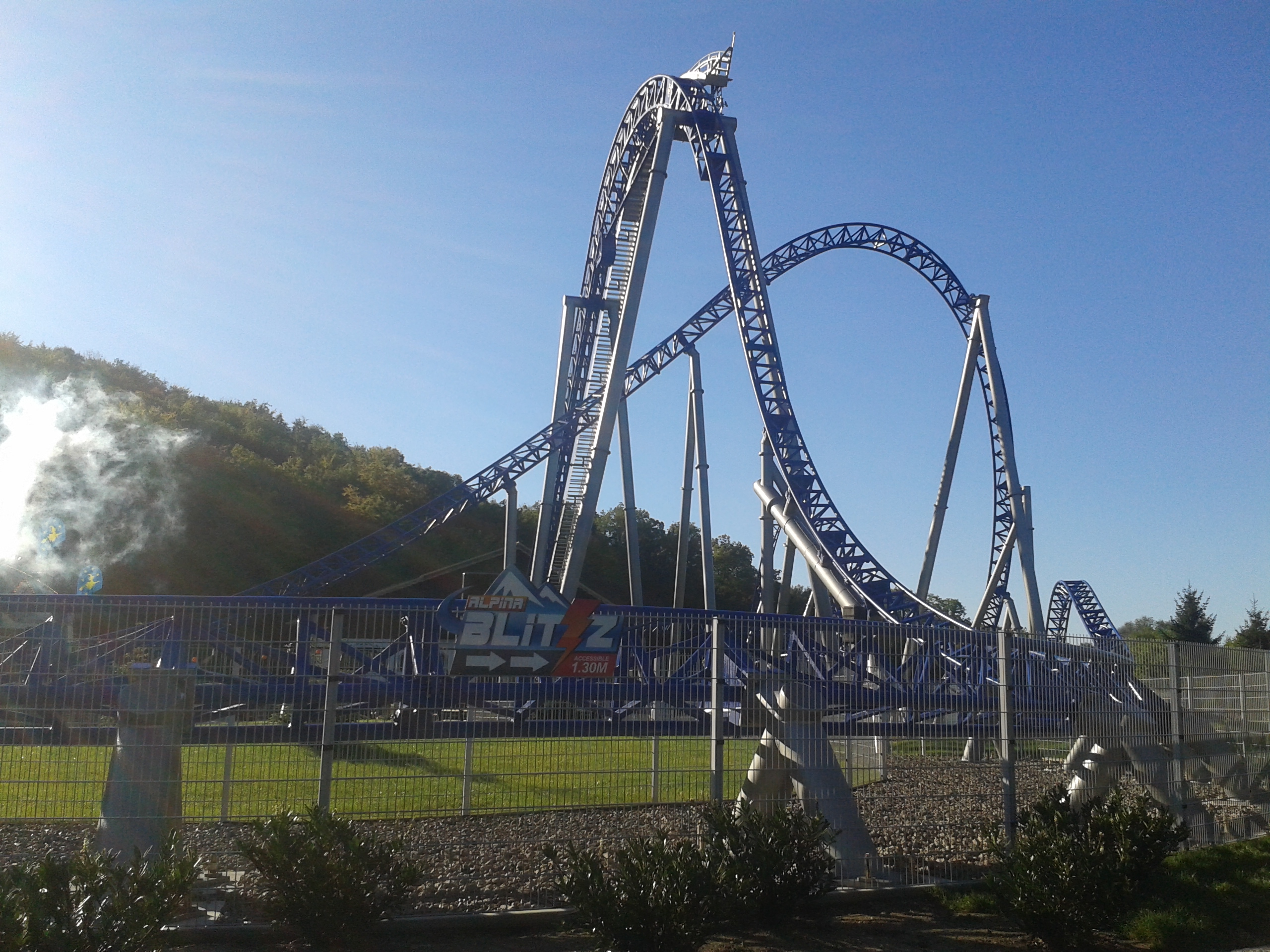

Nigloland
- Location: Nigloland
- Coordinates: 48.2617°N 4.6149°E
- Status: Operating
- Opening date: 12 April 2014
- Cost: €8,000,000

General statistics
- Type: Steel
- Manufacturer: Mack Rides
- Lift/launch system: Chain lift hill
- Height: 33 m (108 ft)
- Length: 719 m (2,359 ft)
- Speed: 83 km/h (52 mph)
- Inversions: 0
- G-force: 4.3
- Trains: 2 trains with 4 cars. Riders are arranged 2 across in 2 rows for a total of 16 riders per train.
- Alpina Blitz at RCDB

Alpina Blitz is a steel roller coaster located at Nigloland in Dolancourt, France. It was manufactured by German manufacturer Mack Rides and opened on 12 April 2014. The ride reaches a height of 33 metres (108 ft), reaches a maximum speed of 83 kilometres per hour (52 mph), and has a track length of 719 metres (2,359 ft).

== Characteristics ==
=== Ride experience ===
Immediately after departing the station, the train begins to ascend the 33-metre (108 ft) lift hill. Following the main drop, the train makes a banked turn to the right before ascending into a twisting hill that passes underneath the lift hill. The train then travels into a straight hill before travelling through another banked right-hand turn. The train then travels over a series of small twisting hills before entering a banked left turn. Following this turn, the train travels over three small hills before turning left into the brake run.

=== Trains ===
Alpina Blitz uses two trains, each with four cars that seat four riders each; this allows a total of 16 riders per train.

== Reception ==
Following the introduction of Alpina Blitz, Nigloland reported a 7% increase in attendance compared to the previous year.
