= Safari Skyway =

Defunct monorail ride

Coordinates: 51.34863°N 0.31728°W

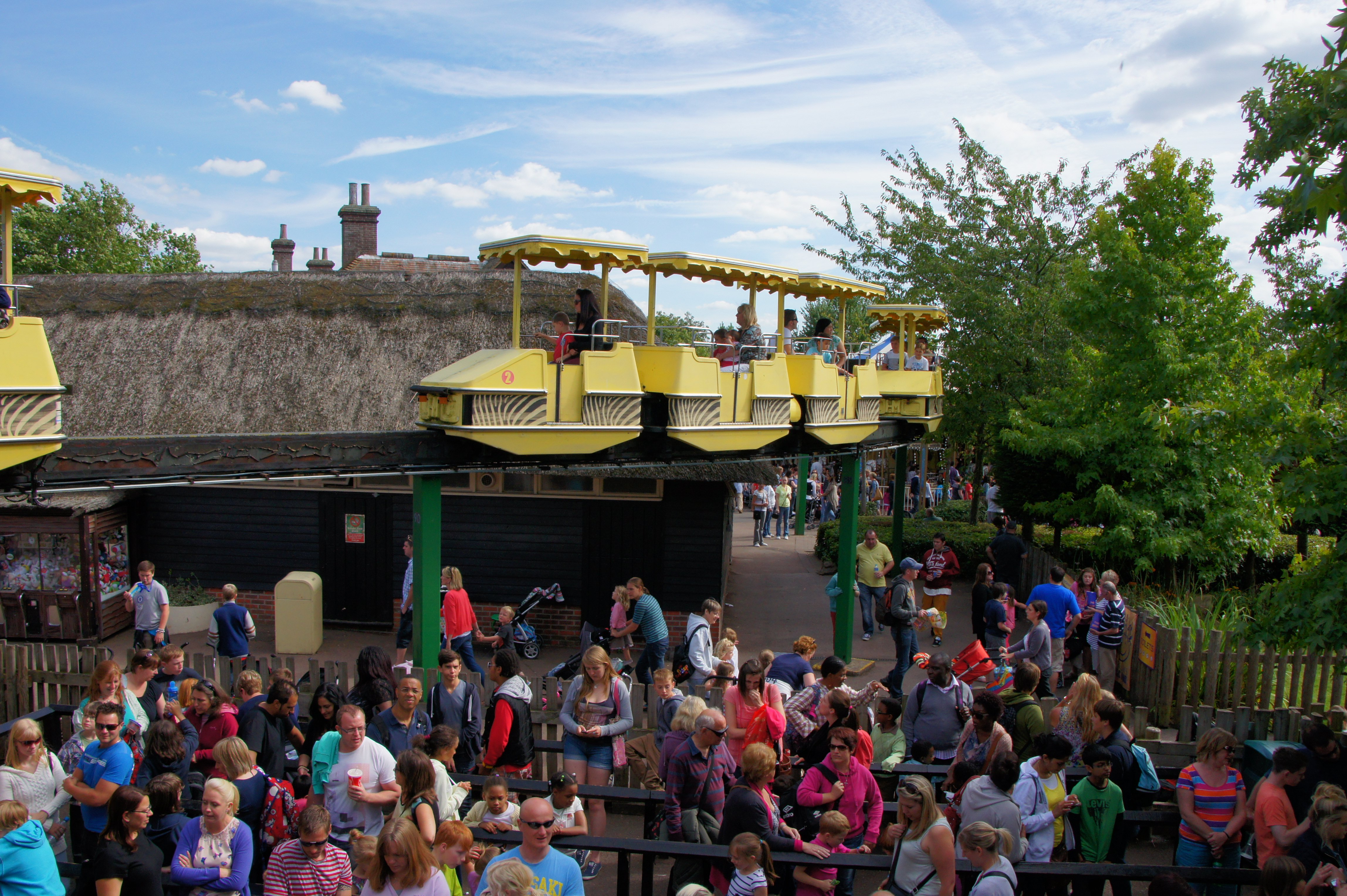
- Ride cars in 2012

Chessington World of Adventures
- Area: Market Square
- Status: Removed
- Opening date: 1986
- Closing date: 31 July 2015

Ride statistics
- Attraction type: Monorail
- Manufacturer: Mack Rides
- Music: The Call to Adventure
- Duration: 8:00
- Closure announced: January 2016

Safari Skyway was a ride that opened in 1986 at Chessington World of Adventures Resort, in the now called Adventure Point). Manufactured by Mack Rides, the ride gave guests a guided tour of Chessington Zoo, and in its first year, the construction of Chessington World of Adventures theme park. The ride ran for almost thirty years before closing abruptly in late July 2015. In early January 2016, the park announced that the ride would be retired due to continuous troubles with maintenance for the ride.

== History ==
Safari Skyway was opened in 1986, as one of the first rides to open at Chessington World of Adventures. Safari Skyway's entrance was towards the back of the Market Square area, and the monorail gave a guided tour of the zoo, lawn and mansion area. In later years of the ride's operation, maintenance of the aging monorail system became difficult, and it suffered frequent breakdowns, including an incident in 2009 when a park-wide power cut stranded the monorail cars mid-route, forcing those inside to be rescued by a cherry picker. Safari Skyway operated for the final time in July 2015 and was officially confirmed as permanently closed in January 2016.

== Description ==
The ride took approximately 8 minutes, and the maximum height restriction for riders was 1.96 meters. Riders under 1.1 meters had to be accompanied by someone 16 or over. The ride passed such features in Chessington Zoo, such as Sea Lion Bay, Amazu, Trail of the Kings and other areas. It first passed the smaller animals in the Children's Zoo, before going behind the Sea Life Centre and near to the Lodge Gate entrance. The ride continued passing nearby (but not directly above) the gorillas, lions and sea lions before returning to the station via the theme park.

== Gallery ==
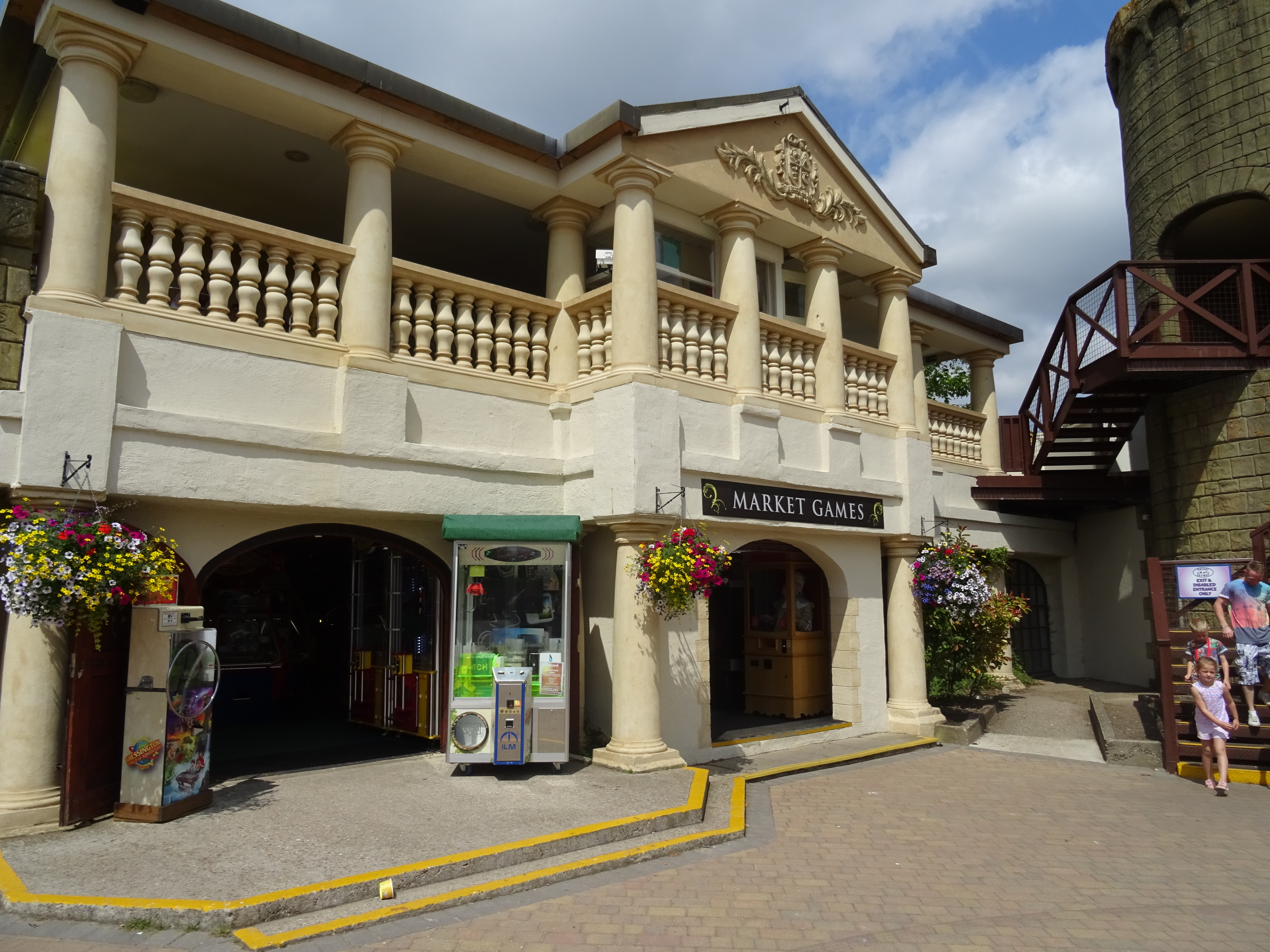
Station building in 2015

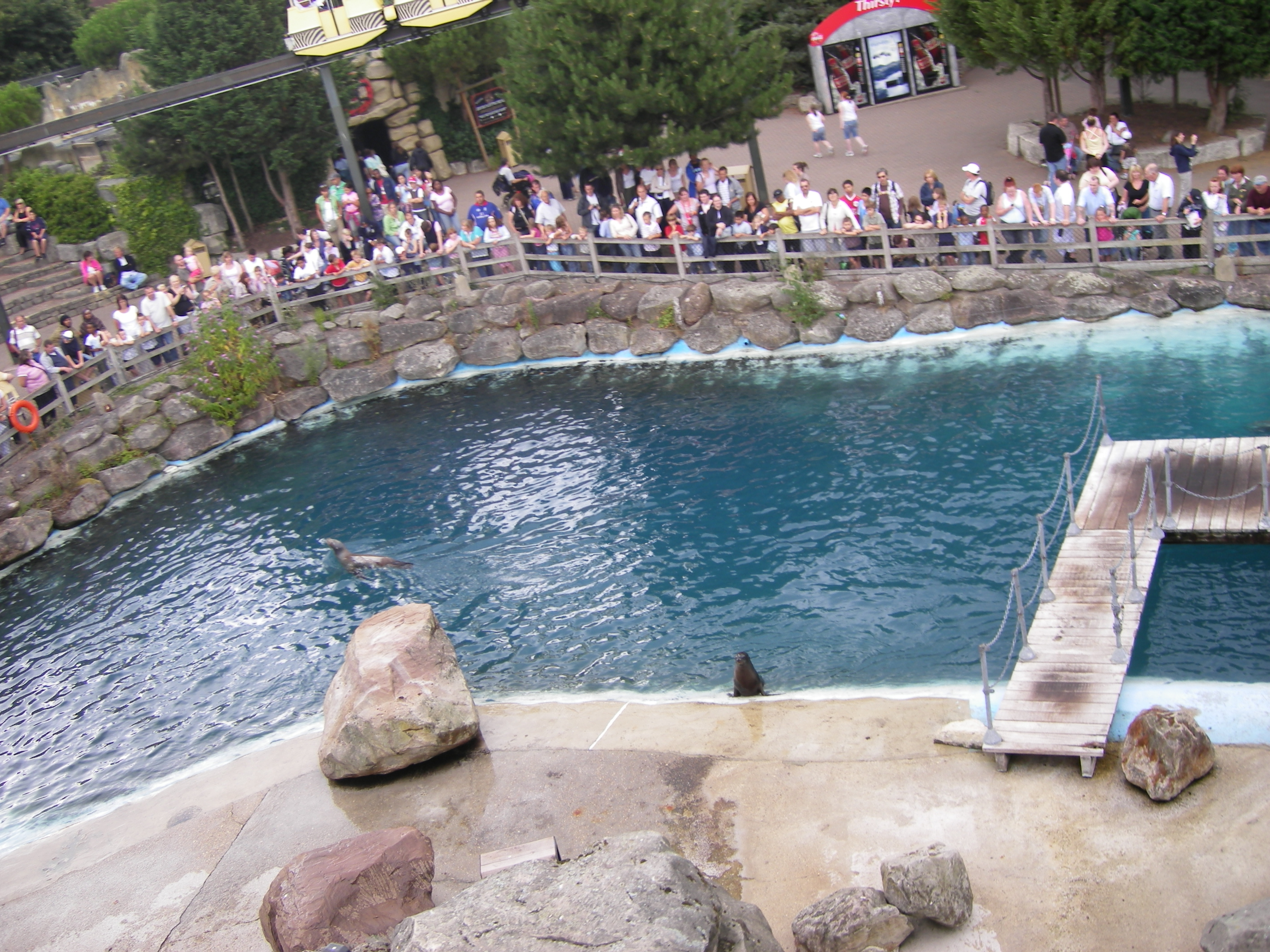
Sealion Bay from Safari Skyway in 2006

== See also ==
- Chessington World of Adventures
