= Dolancourt =

Commune in Grand Est, France

- Commune
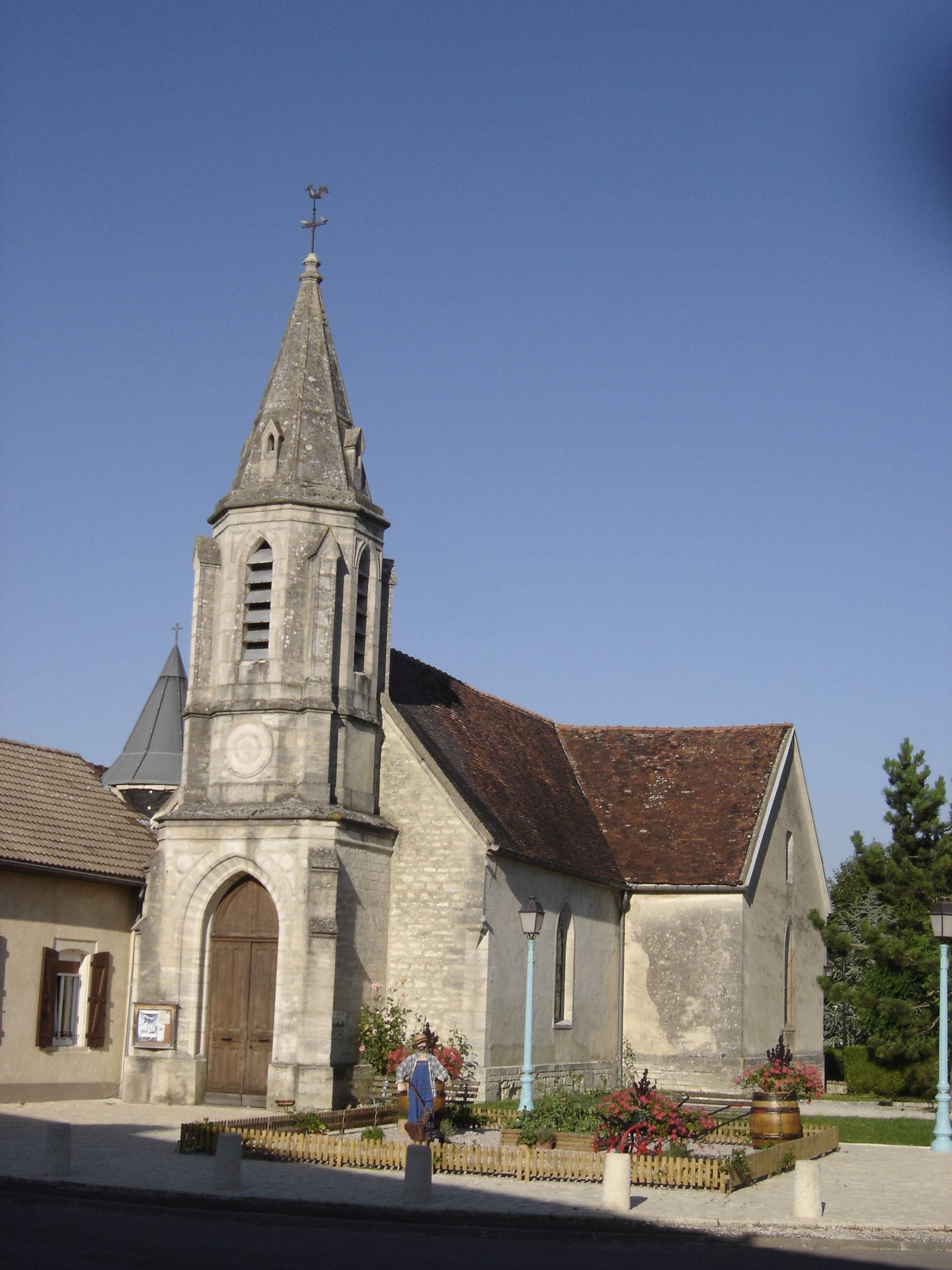
- The church in Dolancourt
- Location of Dolancourt
- Location within France Location within Grand Est
- Coordinates: 48°16′03″N 4°37′05″E
- Country: France
- Region: Grand Est
- Department: Aube
- Arrondissement: Bar-sur-Aube
- Canton: Vendeuvre-sur-Barse

Government
  - Mayor (2020–2026): Catherine Mandelli
- Area^{1}: 4.88 km^{2} (1.88 sq mi)
- Elevation: 112 m (367 ft)
- Population (2023): 124
  - Density: 25.4/km^{2} (65.8/sq mi)
- Time zone: UTC+01:00 (CET)
  - Summer (DST): UTC+02:00 (CEST)
- INSEE/Postal code: 10126 /10200
- ^{1} French Land Register data, which excludes lakes, ponds, glaciers > 1 km^{2} (0.386 sq mi or 247 acres) and river estuaries.

Dolancourt (French pronunciation: [dɔlɑ̃kuʁ]) is a commune in the Aube department in north-central France.

== Population ==
Historical population
Year	Pop.	±% p.a.
1968	146	—
1975	109	−4.09%
1982	165	+6.10%
1990	169	+0.30%
1999	145	−1.69%
2007	141	−0.35%
2012	140	−0.14%
2017	136	−0.58%
2023	124	−1.53%
Source: INSEE

== See also ==
- Communes of the Aube department
- Parc naturel régional de la Forêt d'Orient
