= Virtual reality roller coaster =

Type of roller coaster

A virtual reality roller coaster is a special kind of amusement park ride attraction, consisting of a roller coaster facility or ride that can be experienced with virtual reality headsets. The setup has been widely said to have been invented by Thomas Wagner, who has also produced most of the worldwide installations with his company VR Coaster GmbH & Co. KG since late 2015. The concept of a "virtual reality" coaster was tested first in 2004 with the Galaxie Express at Space Park Bremen in Bremen, Germany. Since then, several theme parks all over the world have been adapting this technology to extend their existing coaster facilities.

== Background and history ==
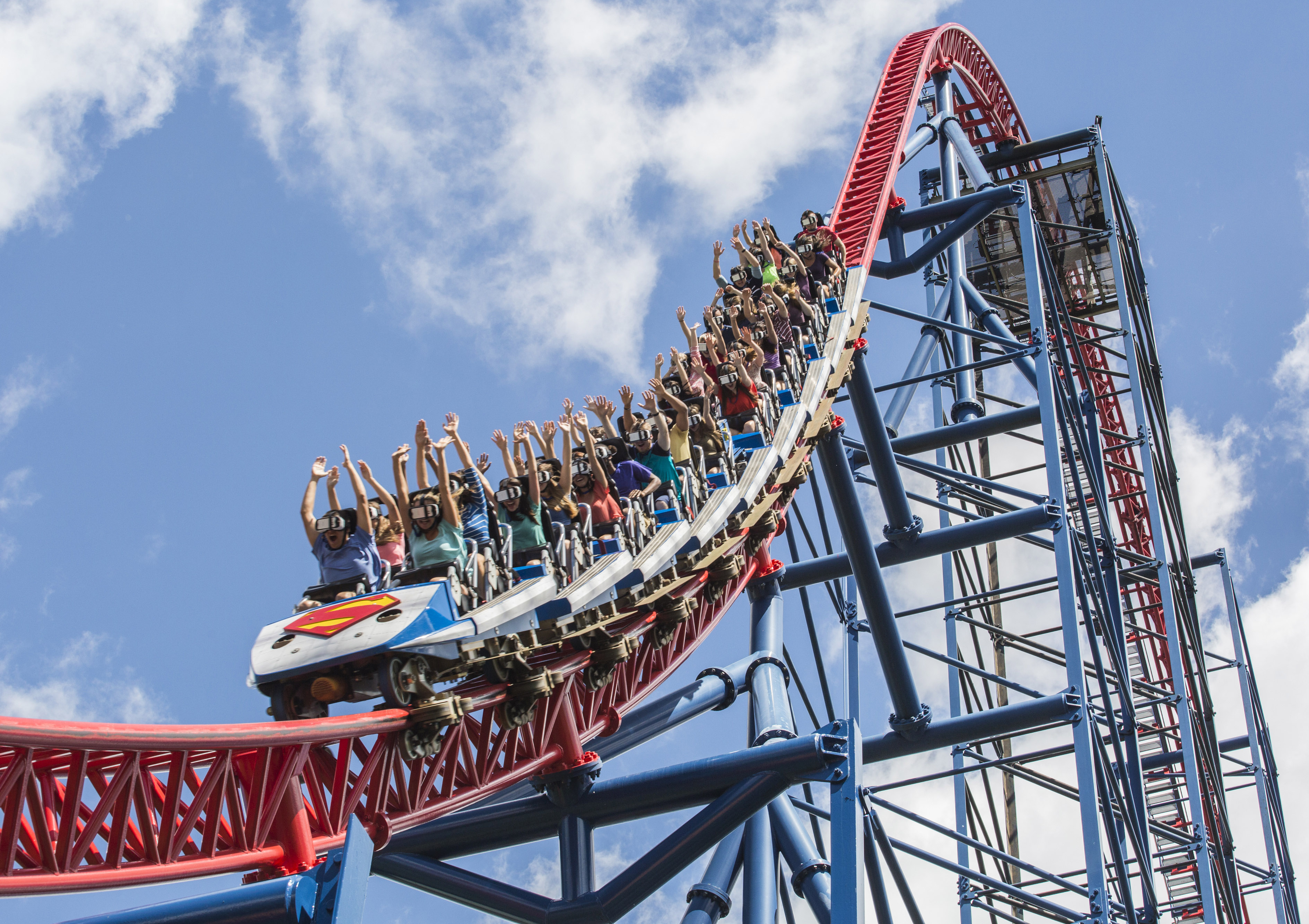
A train of the Superman – The Ride virtual reality roller coaster at the Six Flags New England theme park. Riders are wearing Gear VR virtual reality headsets.

While virtual reality roller coaster simulations quickly became quite popular after the appearance of the Oculus Rift, it showed that dizziness and motion sickness, known as virtual reality sickness, would be a major problem. This was caused by the offset between the simulated motion in virtual reality and the lack of real motion, as the inner sense of balance wouldn't feel the appropriate forces and turns. In order to test if this could be overcome by synchronizing virtual reality movement to real motion, a research group of the University of Applied Sciences, Kaiserslautern, led by Thomas Wagner, together with roller coaster manufacturer Mack Rides and Europa-Park, has been conducting experiments on actual roller coaster facilities since early 2014. It showed that, with a precise synchronization, not only the nausea would disappear, but also a new kind of attraction was created as, for the first time, this setup allowed for a simulation ride to feature continuous G forces, zero gravity and drops (or so-called air time).

Still, the technical setup of the 2014 experiments was not feasible yet for a permanent installation. Most of all, mounting a computer on a coaster train would not have worked due to the continuous heavy vibrations; also the usual cable connection of a classical virtual reality headset like the Oculus Rift would have meant a serious safety hazard. Wagner and his team could eventually overcome these problems by deploying so called mobile virtual reality headsets like the Samsung Gear VR, where the entire image generation happens directly inside of the actual headset. The very first virtual reality roller coaster installations have been opened to the public in late 2015, starting at Europa-Park, Germany, followed by Canada's Wonderland and Universal Studios Japan, all of them developed by the startup company VR Coaster, which originated from Wagners Research Group.

In 2014, another startup called Astral Vision presented a wearable technology prototype for theme park rides that uses mobile phone sensors and does not require additional sensors.

As of June 2016, 17 theme parks worldwide were operating virtual reality roller coasters.

== Technical solutions ==
Key to a comfortable virtual reality experience on an actual moving ride attraction is a precise synchronization of the virtual ride animation. To achieve this, the coaster train is equipped with special hardware that monitors the position of the train in the track layout and then wirelessly transmits this information to the headsets of the riders. This is also crucial, as the virtual reality experience needs to run in absolute tracking mode (unlike relative tracking when used at home, where the virtual reality view automatically rotates with a virtual vehicle), so without a precise tracking solution, curves and turns would not be in the right place. In other words, a virtual cockpit must always turn and travel in exactly the same direction as the real coaster car, which would not be possible without an automated synchronization. Still, as the human sense of balance can't detect absolute velocities but only acceleration and turns, speed and dimensions can be altered in virtual reality. Even curves can be bent to different angles, as long as the relative direction of the turn is preserved (clockwise or counterclockwise).

== Experience ==
As virtual reality allows for several modifications and extensions of the actual track layout, the size of the virtual reality track can be much larger than the real one. This of course means that speeds can be much faster and heights much taller, as these aspects also grow with the increased dimensions. Most of all, there is no need to show an actual track or rails (which would give away what element comes next), other than for dramaturgical reasons. As the rider is totally immersed in the virtual reality world, one can even be tricked by giving hints on a wrong track direction and then e.g. have a giant creature grabbing the virtual cockpit and carrying it into a different direction (which turns out to be the actual direction of the rails). Also, the effect of physical track elements like block brakes can be utilized in the virtual reality experience for dramatic elements like crashing through a virtual barrier or building. Riders report after their first virtual reality roller coaster ride that it is unlike anything they have ever experienced before.

== Operation ==
Riders are provided with virtual reality headsets to wear whilst on the ride. These headsets may be portable, or permanently attached to the ride itself and will display a synchronised video to the riders who experience the motions of the ride combined with the alternate reality provided through the headsets. After the ride, headsets are sanitised and (where applicable) recharged for future use.

In most cases, the virtual reality aspect of the ride is optional, and in some cases a supplement may be required for use.

== Appearances ==
In operation?	Name	Name of roller coaster	Type	Duration	Length (meters)	VR optional?	Opening	Roller coaster manufacturer	VR developer	Park	Country	City, region	Note
☒	Galaxie Express	Galaxie Express	Powered Coaster		499		February 2004	Mack Rides			Germany	Bremen, Bremen	Test concept of a "virtual reality" coaster.
check	Alpenexpress Coastiality	Alpenexpress Enzian	Powered Coaster	1:40	264	5/19 VR-Rows	September 17, 2015	Mack Rides	MackMedia and VR Coaster	Europa-Park	Germany	Rust, Baden-Württemberg	
check	Thunder Run VR	Thunder Run	Powered Coaster	1:24	330.1	check	October 3, 2015	Mack Rides	VR Coaster	Canada's Wonderland	Canada	Vaughan, Ontario	
check	VR Coaster	Freedom Flyer	Suspended Family Coaster	1:00	395	check	November 16, 2015	Vekoma	VR Coaster	Fun Spot America	United States	Orlando, Florida	VR Demonstration at IAAPA 2015
check	Universal Studios Japan XR Rides	Space Fantasy: The Ride	Spinning Coaster	2:35	585	check	January 14, 2016	Mack Rides	VR Coaster	Universal Studios Japan	Japan	Osaka, Osaka	Japan's first rollercoaster fully dedicated to Virtual Reality
☒	Galactic Attack Virtual Reality Coaster	Shock Wave	Sit-Down Coaster	2:00	1097.3	check	March 10, 2016	Schwarzkopf	VR Coaster	Six Flags Over Texas	United States	Arlington, Texas	
☒	Galactic Attack Virtual Reality Coaster	Dare Devil Dive	Sit-Down Coaster		639.8	check	March 12, 2016	Gerstlauer Amusement Rides	VR Coaster	Six Flags Over Georgia	United States	Austell, Georgia	
☒	Pegasus Coastiality	Pegasus	Youngstar Coaster	1:30	400	4/10 VR-Rows	March 17, 2016	Mack Rides	Ambient Entertainment, VR Coaster and MackMedia	Europa-Park	Germany	Rust, Baden-Württemberg	
check	Dinolino's VR-Ride	Familienachterbahn	Sit-Down Coaster	1:25	222	check	March 19, 2016	Zierer	VR Coaster	Erlebnispark Schloss Thurn	Germany	Heroldsbach, Bayern	
☒	Galactica	Air	Flying Coaster	1:40	840	check	March 24, 2016	Bolliger & Mabillard	Figment Productions	Alton Towers Resort	United Kingdom	Alton, Staffordshire Moorlands	
☒	Galactic Attack Virtual Reality Coaster	New Revolution	Sit-Down Coaster	2:12	1053.7	check	March 25, 2016	Schwarzkopf	VR Coaster	Six Flags Magic Mountain	United States	Valencia, California	
check	Mount Mara	Revolution	Sit-Down Coaster	2:20	720	check	March 26, 2016	Vekoma	VR Coaster	Bobbejaanland	Belgium	Lichtaart, Antwerp	
check	Linnunrata eXtra	Linnunrata	Sit-Down Coaster	0:50	360	check	May 1, 2016	Zierer	VR Coaster	Linnanmäki	Finland	Helsinki, Uusimaa, Finland	
☒	The New Revolution Virtual Reality Coaster	Goliath	Hyper Coaster		1231	check	May 19, 2016	Bolliger & Mabillard	VR Coaster	La Ronde	Canada	Montréal, Québec	
☒	Iron Dragon	Iron Dragon	Suspended Coaster	2:00	853	check	May 24, 2016	Arrow Dynamics	VR Coaster	Cedar Point	United States	Sandusky, Ohio	
☒	Galactic Attack Virtual Reality Coaster	Ninja	Sit-Down Coaster	2:00	740.7	check	May 24, 2016	Vekoma	VR Coaster	Six Flags St. Louis	United States	Eureka, Missouri	
☒	SUPERMAN Ride of Steel Virtual Reality Coaster	Superman - Ride of Steel	Mega Coaster	2:10	1630.7	check	June 8, 2016	Intamin Amusement Rides	VR Coaster	Six Flags America	United States	Upper Marlboro, Maryland	
☒	SUPERMAN Krypton Coaster Virtual Reality Coaster	Superman Krypton Coaster	Floorless Coaster	2:35	1226.8	check	June 8, 2016	Bolliger & Mabillard	VR Coaster	Six Flags Fiesta Texas	United States	San Antonio, Texas	
☒	SUPERMAN The Ride Virtual Reality Coaster	Superman the Ride	Mega Coaster	2:35	1645.9	check	June 9, 2016	Intamin Amusement Rides	VR Coaster	Six Flags New England	United States	Agawam, Massachusetts	
☒	The New Revolution Virtual Reality Coaster	Steamin' Demon	Sit-Down Coaster	0:37	477	check	June 20, 2016	Arrow Dynamics	VR Coaster	Great Escape	United States	Queensbury, New York	
check	Olandese Volante	Olandese Volante	Mine Train	2.30	681	check	June 25, 2016	Vekoma	Moviemex3D	Rainbow Magic Land	Italy	Valmontone (Rome)	First Italian VR Coaster
☒	Rage of the Gargoyles: Virtual Reality Coaster	Demon	Sit-Down Coaster	1:45	649	check	August 10, 2016	Arrow Dynamics	VR Coaster	Six Flags Great America	United States	Gurnee, Illinois	
☒	Rage of the Gargoyles: Virtual Reality Coaster	Skull Mountain	Sit-Down Coaster	1:24	420	check	September 20, 2016	Intamin Amusement Rides	VR Coaster	Six Flags Great Adventure	United States	Jackson, New Jersey	
☒	Rage of the Gargoyles: Virtual Reality Coaster	Kong	Suspended Looping Coaster	1:36	689	check	September 22, 2016	Vekoma	VR Coaster	Six Flags Discovery Kingdom	United States	Vallejo, California	
☒	Rage of the Gargoyles: Virtual Reality Coaster	Shock Wave	Sit-Down Coaster	2:00	1097.3	check		Schwarzkopf	VR Coaster	Six Flags Over Texas	United States	Arlington, Texas	
☒	Rage of the Gargoyles: Virtual Reality Coaster	Ninja	Sit-Down Coaster	2:00	740.7	check		Vekoma	VR Coaster	Six Flags St. Louis	United States	Eureka, Missouri	
☒	Rage of the Gargoyles: Virtual Reality Coaster	Dare Devil Dive	Sit-Down Coaster		639.8	check		Gerstlauer Amusement Rides	VR Coaster	Six Flags Over Georgia	United States	Austell, Georgia	
☒	Rage of the Gargoyles: Virtual Reality Coaster	Goliath	Hyper Coaster		1231	check		Bolliger & Mabillard	VR Coaster	La Ronde	Canada	Montréal, Québec	
check	Freedom Flyer 2.0	Freedom Flyer	Suspended Family Coaster	1:00	395	check	November 16, 2016	Vekoma	VR Coaster	Fun Spot America	United States	Orlando, Florida	
☒	Santa's Wild Sleigh Ride	The New Revolution	Sit-Down Coaster	2:12	1053.7	check	November 19, 2016	Schwarzkopf	VR Coaster	Six Flags Magic Mountain	United States	Valencia, California	Christmas Special
☒	SHAMAN	Magic Mountain (roller coaster)	Sit-Down Coaster	2:00	700	check	2017	Vekoma	Figment Productions	Gardaland	Italy	Castelnuovo del Garda, Veneto	
check	Arkham Asylum	Arkham Asylum – Shock Therapy	Suspended Looping Coaster	1:42	765	check	2016-17	Vekoma	VR Coaster	Warner Bros. Movie World	Australia	Gold Coast, Queensland	
check	Evangelion XR Ride	Space Fantasy - The Ride	Sit-Down Coaster		585	check	January 13, 2017	Mack Rides	VR Coaster	Universal Studios Japan	Japan	Osaka, Osaka	This ride is a part of the "Universal Cool Japan 2017" event, concluded on June 25, 2017.
check	Dæmonen Virtual Reality	Dæmonen	Floorless Coaster	1:46	564	check	April 6, 2017	Bolliger & Mabillard	VR Coaster	Tivoli Gardens	Denmark	Copenhagen	
check	Tren de la Mina VR Coaster	Tren de la Mina	Sit-Down Coaster	1:46	564	check	May 20, 2017	Gerstlauer Amusement Rides GmbH	VR Coaster	Parque de Atracciones de Madrid	Spain	Madrid	
check	Astral Vision	WindstarZ	Family Rides	2:01	480	check	March, 2017	Zamperla	Astral Vision	Luna Park	United States	New York	
☒	Master Thai VR Coaster	Master Thai	Sit-Down Coaster	2:10		check	May 20, 2017	Preston & Barbieri	VR Coaster	Mirabilandia	Italy	Savio	
check	Titan VR Coaster	Titan	Sit-Down Coaster	1:20	823	check	January 14, 2017	Sansei Technologies	VR Coaster	Selva Mágica	Mexico	Guadalajara	
☒	Galactic Attack: Mind Eraser Virtual Reality Coaster	Mind Eraser	Suspended Looping Coaster	1:36	689	check	May 20, 2017	Vekoma	VR Coaster	Six Flags New England	United States	Agawam	
☒	Galactic Attack: Mind Eraser Virtual Reality Coaster	Mind Eraser	Suspended Looping Coaster	1:36	689	check	May 20, 2017	Vekoma	VR Coaster	Six Flags America	United States	Upper Marlboro	
check	Joyride Virtual Reality Coaster	Joyride	Sit-Down Coaster	1:15	280	check	May 20, 2017	L&T Systems	VR Coaster	Powerland	Finland	Kauhava	
check	French Revolution 2.0 VR	French Revolution	Sit-Down Coaster	1:45		check	November 26, 2016	Vekoma	VR Coaster	Lotte World	South Korea	Seoul	
check	Batman: Arkham Asylum VR Coaster	Batman: Arkham Asylum	Inverted Coaster	1:20	823	check	May 20, 2017	Bolliger & Mabillard	VR Coaster	Parque Warner Madrid	Spain	Madrid	
check	Steampunk Hunters	Western-Expressen	Sit-Down Coaster	1:15	335	check	April 22, 2017	Vekoma	VR Coaster	Tusenfryd	Norway	Vinterbro, Akershus	
check	Gletscherblitz	Gletscherblitz	Powered Coaster			check	March 24, 2018	Mack Rides	VR Coaster	Steinwasen Park	Germany	Oberried, Baden-Württemberg	
check	Dream Catcher VR	Dream Catcher	Swinging Turns	2:44	600	check	June 23, 2018	Vekoma	VR Coaster	Bobbejaanland	Belgium	Lichtaart, Antwerp	
check	Eurosat Coastiality	Eurosat - CanCan Coaster	Indoor roller coaster	3:20	900	check	September 13, 2018	Mack Rides	MackMedia and VR Coaster	Europa-Park	Germany	Rust, Baden-Württemberg	Coaster features separate stations for VR and non VR ride on the same roller coaster. VR riders enter the coaster train with VR headset already on.
check	Den Hemmelige Verden	Viktor Vandorm	Sit-Down Coaster		750	check	2018	Zierer	VR Coaster	BonBon-Land	Denmark	Holme-Olstrup, Sjælland	
check	Virtual Express	Tibidabo Express	Powered Coaster			☒	2017	Zamperla	VR Coaster	Tibidabo	Spain	Barcelona	Similar film about "Schloss Balthasar" as at Europa-Park
check	Crazy Bats	Crazy Bats	Enclosed roller coaster	4:00	1300	check	June 25, 2019	Vekoma	Ambient Entertainment	Phantasialand	Germany	Brühl	Film about the three bats from the German film Monster Family
check	Wilde Maus	Wilde Maus XXL	Wild Mouse	2:30	585	check		Mack Rides	VR Coaster	Traveling	Germany		
check	VR Rollercoaster (高空VR过山车)	VR Rollercoaster (高空VR过山车)	Junior Coaster		320	check	1996	Vekoma		Oriental Pearl Tower	People's Republic of China	Shanghai	
check	Hurricane 360	Hurricane 360 VR	Youngstar Coaster	2:11	400	check		Mack Rides	Ambient Entertainment, DOF Robotics, VR Coaster and MackMedia	Chimelong Paradise	People's Republic of China	Guangzhou	The same film which has formerly been used at Pegasus at Europa-Park
