= Arvid Boecker =

German painter and curator

- Born: 1964 (age 61–62); Wuppertal, West Germany
- Known for: Concrete art, abstract art
- Movement: Color field painting
- Website: arvid-boecker.de

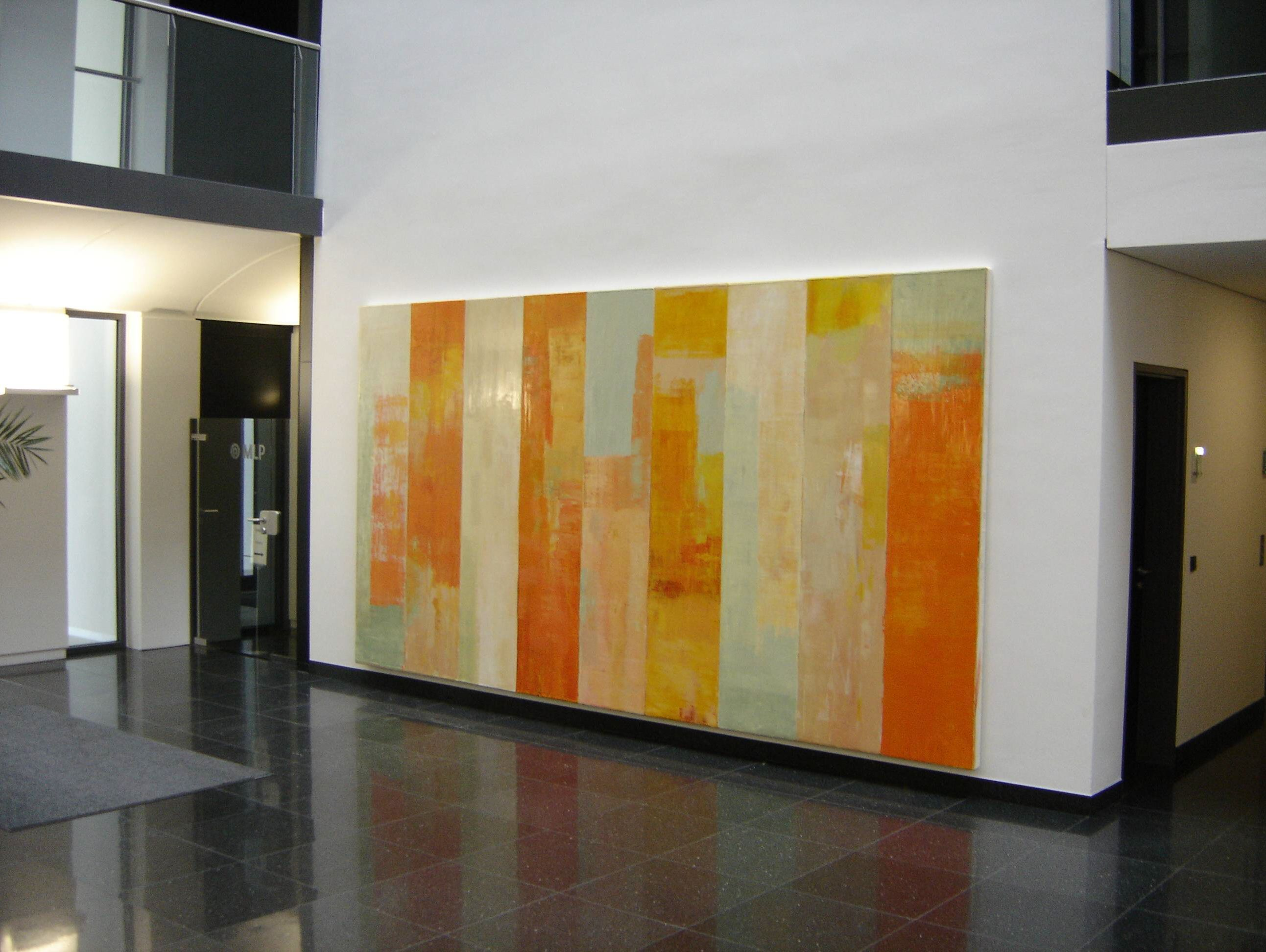
Title "#512", 2007, 98×197 inches, in the foyer of a law company in Mannheim, Germany

Arvid Boecker (born 1964 in Wuppertal) is a German painter and curator. He is a representative of concrete art and focuses on color field painting.

== Biography ==
Arvid Boecker studied from 1987 to 1989 at the University of Trier Art history, continuing his studies at the Hochschule der Bildenden Künste Saar in Saarbrücken. There he studied until 1994 with the professors Jochen Gerz, Bodo Baumgarten, and Ulrike Rosenbach. In the following years he was Artist-in-residence in London (Acme Studios, 1994-1995), in Katwijk aan Zee in the Netherlands (1995-1996), on the Isle of Skye (2005), in La Ciotat in southern France in 2006, and in 2018 he went to Paris for a residency at Factory49.

Since 1996 Boecker has been a member of the Saarländischer Künstlerbund and since 2019 he is also a member of the Künstlerbund Baden-Württemberg. He lives and works in Heidelberg, since 2018 he also has a studio in Frankfurt am Main.

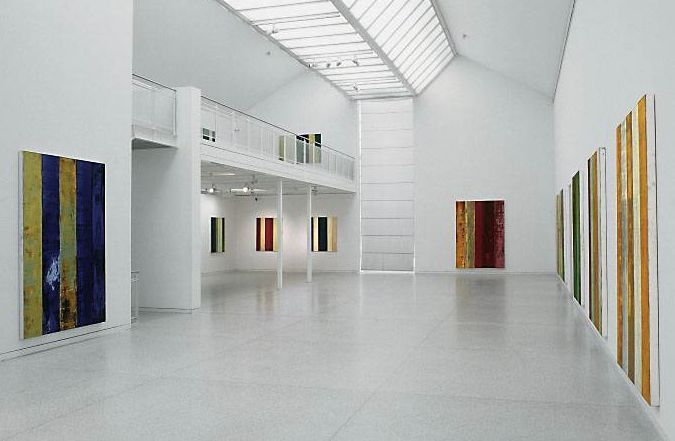
Large exhibition room Heidelberger Kunstverein Arvid Boecker Milk & Honey, 2005 Blue picture left: Title "#313", 2004, Oil on canvas, 95×67 inches Red picture in the background: Title "#314", 2004, Oil on canvas, 95×67 inches)

== Artistic work ==
Arvid Boecker's theme as an artist is color itself. He uses oil paint, which he manufactures himself from pigments and applies to canvas. Priming the canvases requires long drying times, so Boecker always creates entire rows of canvasses with the same dimensions, on which he works alternately. He numbers the images and adds a hash tag to them, for example: "#1103". He describes these series as "picture families". Arvid Boecker determines right at the beginning how he deals with the surface, dividing it up for certain color applications. His works are either rectangular or square. Since 2014 Boecker has concentrated on the format 20×16 inches, which he divides by a longitudinal line into two fields, which he then paints with different colors. The color is applied in up to 40 layers, partly wash, partly impasto. Arvid Boecker uses squeegees to remove older layers of paint or applies new layers of paint with the painting knife. This processing can take up to one year.

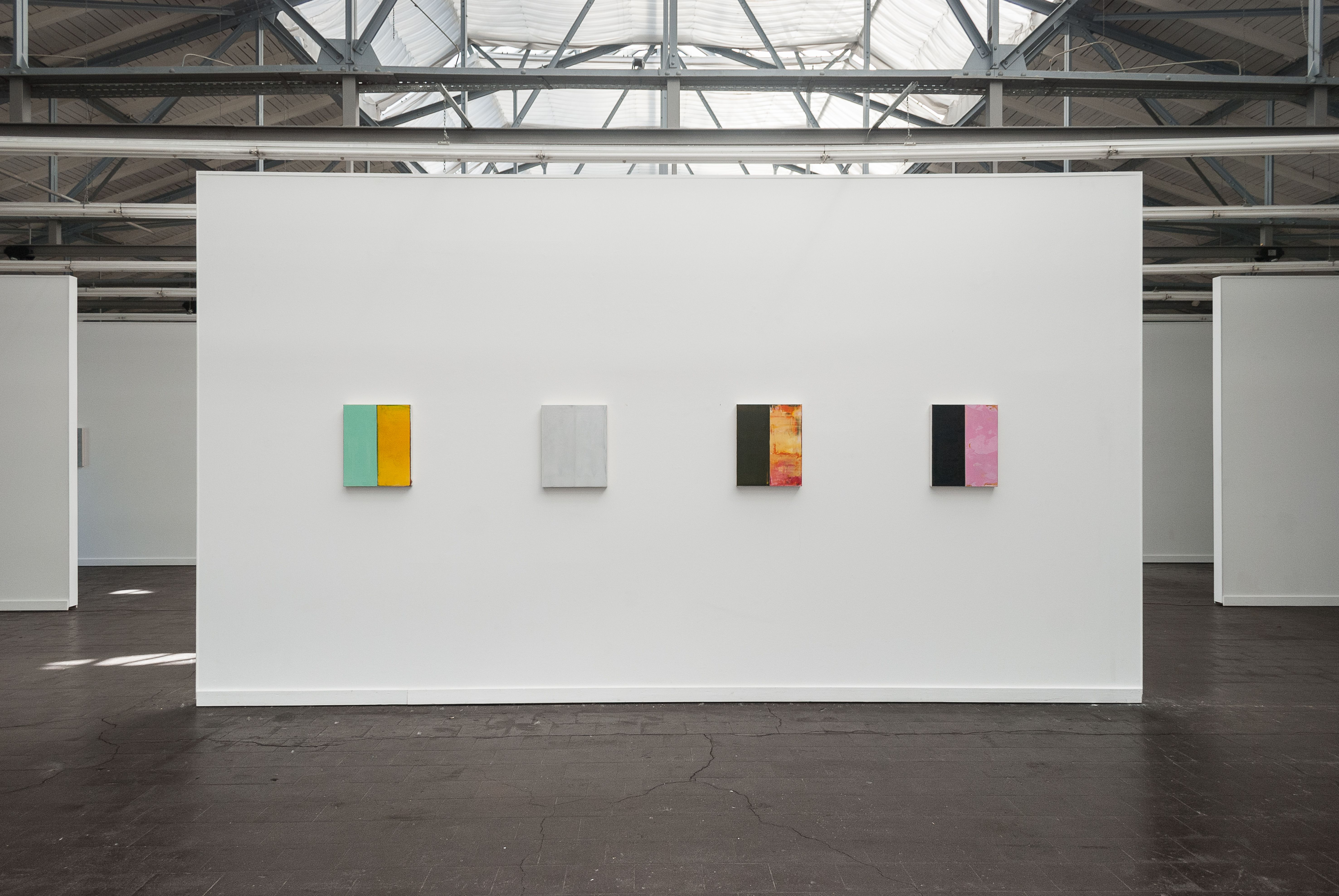
Exhibition view 2018 at the Verein für aktuelle Kunst Ruhrgebiet e.V., Oberhausen, Germany The photo shows the works titled "#1156", "#1167", "#1173", "#1176", all oil on canvas, 2018, 20×16×3 inches

During this long period, his pictures mature. He often stops working on a painting to give it time to dry. For Boecker the painting of a piece becomes a process of reflection on the function of color and its effects. The artist reflects upon, how which effect is produced in the viewer, how the colors do interact with each other and to which result: "So wird der Maler manchmal zum Forscher in seinem eigenen Werk, indem er wie ein Archäologe alte Schichten und Zustände sucht und wieder zum Vorschein bringt. Er ist Schöpfer und Zerstörer in einem, lässt entstehen und löscht wieder aus, kreiert und verwirft. Aber nicht aus einer Laune heraus, sondern immer im Hinblick auf das Gelingen des Bildes als Ganzes." (in English: "Thus the painter sometimes becomes a researcher in his own work, searching for and revealing old layers and states like an archaeologist. He is creator and destroyer in one, lets arise and extinguishes again, creates and rejects. But not on a whim, but always with a view to the succeeding of the picture as a whole.") The painting created in such a long working process clearly shows the traces of its creation, e.g. through shadows - darker layers of paint were painted over by light ones – or through scratches, which allow views of the older layers of paint.

Boecker also designs entire room concepts, e.g. 2012 for the Städtische Galerie Neunkirchen. For this exhibition he created 40 square works, which again were divided into smaller squares and painted with different colors. In addition, he structured the exhibition space with specially made colored tuffets and wall markings with colored adhesive tape that stretched from the wall to the floor and formed a rectangle. This three–dimensional installation was intended to enable the viewer to reflect on how he perceives the works of art in the room. In 2016 Boecker created a triptych for the Stiftskirche Sunnisheim in Sinsheim, consisting of three pictures of the same format, which were created especially for this room.

Boecker sees himself as a "travelling observer". His stays abroad, e.g. 1995 in Katwijk aan Zee in the Netherlands, 2005 on the Isle of Skye and 2006 to La Ciotat he perceives as research expeditions concerning light and colors. Katwijk has already had an international artists' colony in the 19th century. La Ciotat in southern France has also always attracted artists, because of the sharply defined contrasts in the southern light conditions by the sea, and the harbor atmosphere, which fascinated the artists already at the beginning of the 20th century. The Isle of Skye is famous for its foggy coastline, which often makes the light diffuse and shimmer.

Boecker assimilates all these impulses and experiences in his works: "Was ich auf meinen Bildern male, sind Erinnerungen" (in English: "What I paint in my canvases are memories") However, not memories in the sense of landscape pictures, but memories that every artist carries with him unconsciously or consciously and that influence his art. Arvid Boecker takes meditative approach due to the long time taken in creating his artworks. In the months until the completion of a work he can reflect extensively on the effects of the application of paint. He can put his piece away for a while and continue to work on another. Boecker can constantly look at and work on the canvases with squeegees and spatulas until they express exactly what he wants to achieve. Viewed from a distance they sometimes look like monochromes, but when viewed closely one sees the multitude of different layers in the paintings. Not only is the production of his art time consuming, but the viewer must take the time to perceive all aspects of the paintings: "Boeckers Werke strahlen Ruhe und Kraft aus – und auch wenn er bewusst jeden Anschein alles Bildhaften vermeidet, bieten sie dennoch eine Projektionsfläche für eine Vielzahl an Assoziationen." (in English: "Boeckers' works radiate calmness and strength – and even if he consciously avoids any appearance of anything pictorial, they nevertheless offer a projection screen for a multitude of associations.")

== Solo exhibitions (selection) ==
- 1996: unentwegt, Forum Kunst Rottweil, Rottweil, Germany
- 2005: Milch und Honig, Heidelberger Kunstverein, Heidelberg, Germany
- 2006: Kilmuir Walk, Villa Goecke, Krefeld, Germany
- 2007: Studio La Ciotat, Galerie Robert Drees, Hannover, Germany
- 2012: Take your time, Städtische Galerie Neunkirchen, Neunkirchen, Germany
- 2015: Surfaced from his dive, Galerie Ursula Grashey, Konstanz, Germany
- 2016: Insomnia, Stout Projects, New York City, United States
- 2016: On a clear Day, Factory 49, Sydney, Australia
- 2018: Watching paint dry, Kunstverein Brackenheim, Brackenheim, Germany
- 2019: Free, (This exhibition was divided into two parts, firstly a solo exhibition of the artist (Free), secondly a group exhibition curated by him as part of his project boeckercontemporary (Breathe).
- 2020: Arvid Boecker: Malerei, Forum Kunst Rottweil, Rottweil, Germany

== Group exhibitions (selection) ==
- 1990: Promotion award for young artists, Wilhelm-Hack-Museum, Ludwigshafen, Germany
- 1995: Work Art, Kunstmuseum Stuttgart, Stuttgart, Germany
- 1996 Artifizielle Natur, Städtische Galerie, Böblingen, Germany
- 1998: Zeichnung, Dominican museum Rottweil, Rottweil, Germany
- 2000: Expo 2000: Weltausstellung, Von der Heydt-Museum, Wuppertal, Germany
- 2003: Form und Struktur. Wege zur Abstraktion II, Kunstverein Schloss Plön, Plön, Germany
- 2005: Tangenten, Stadtgalerie Saarbrücken, Saarbrücken, Germany
- 2005: Amber Room Society, (The Amber Room Society consisted of Arvid Boecker, Jürgen Jansen and Uwe Esser), Augsburg, Germany
- 2007: Tysk Samtids Kunst, Galleri Tonne, Oslo
- 2008: Landeskunstausstellung Saar: Dein Land macht Kunst, Saarland Museum, Saarbrücken, Germany
- 2010: Geheimnisvolle Zwischenwelten, Museum Pfalzgalerie Kaiserslautern, Kaiserslautern, Germany
- 2015: Abstract Strategies, Galerie Mirta Demare, Rotterdam, The Netherlands
- 2016: An einem Tisch – Zeitgenössische Positionen geometrischer Abstraktion, Galerie Robert Drees, Hannover, Germany
- 2016: Sandwiches. Presented by the Talent Agency, Cartel Artspace, Bangkok, Thailand
- 2017: Trans, Raygun Projects, Toowoomba, Australia
- 2018: Arvid Boecker – Malerei; Boris Doempke – Installation; Christiane Gruber – Malerei, Verein für aktuelle Kunst/Ruhrgebiet e.V., Oberhausen, Germany
- 2018: 4ABSTRACT2NOT, Quadrart Dornbirn, Dornbirn, Austria
- 2018: Sydney Paris Sunrise, Galerie Abstract Project, Paris, France

== Awards ==
- 1990: 2nd prize, Young Artists Award, Saar Ferngas, Saarbrücken, Germany
- 1994: Art Award of the City of Landau, Germany
- 1994: Promotion award of the city of Groß-Gerau GG-Perspective

== Projectroom in Heidelberg ==
Since 2015 Arvid Boecker has a project room in Heidelberg - boeckercontemporary. Boecker's intention is to establish a "place of encounter with contemporary art" in Heidelberg. Each year, four to six exhibitions of "internationally established positions in non-objective painting" are to be organized. To this end, he collaborates with independent curators worldwide, but also curates several exhibitions himself. The goal of the project space also is to provide more networking in the region and thus to contribute to an active exhibition life. Since 2017, he also realizes exhibitions curated by him at various venues, such as the Galerie Oqbo in Berlin (2017, Better late than ugly) and the Museum St. Wendel (2019, Breathe).

=== Exhibitions ===
- 2016: Gruppenausstellung Systems of Compliance, (with Christoph Borowiak, Jin-Kyoung Huh, Yoon Jung Kim und Line Krom), 19. to 21. September, curated by Aline von der Asse
- 2016: Douglas Witmer (Philadelphia): Naranja, 22. July to 19. August, curated by Arvid Boecker
- 2017: Better late than ugly, OQBO Gallery, Berlin, Germany
- 2017: Black Box(es), Metz, France (This exhibition was also shown in April 2018 at the Künstlerhaus Saar as well as from 12 April to 4 June 2018 at the Casino Luxemburg Forum d'art contemporain. In 2019 the travelling exhibition was to be seen at La 'S' Grand Atelier, in Vielsalm in Belgium from 5 May to 21 June 2019.
- 2017: Groupexhibition In Good Shape, (with Michael Bause, Christian Bilger, Frank Eltner, Dirk Lebahn, Seraphina Lenz, Julia Ziegler), 4. March to 7. April, curated by Arvid Boecker
- 2017: Groupexhibition Timelines Non Objective Art from Australia, (with Emma Langridge, David Weir, Louise Blyton, Terri Brooks, Giles Ryder, Billy Gruner, Sarah Keighery, Richard van der Aa, Kyle Jenkins, Matthew Allen), 21. April bis 19. May, curated by Arvid Boecker
- 2018: Groupexhibition Absolute, (with Matthew Allan, Emma Langridge, Steven Baris, Stan Van Steendam, Nicholas Szymanski, Mary Bucci McCoy, Kenichi Fujiwara, Robert Dunne, John Tallman)
- 2019: Free, (This exhibition was divided into two parts, firstly a solo exhibition of the artist (Free), secondly a group exhibition curated by him as part of his project boeckercontemporary (Breathe).
