= Fun Spot =

Fun Spot or Funspot may refer to:

== Places ==
=== United States ===
- Fun Spot America Theme Parks, a group of amusement parks located in Florida:
  - Fun Spot America (Kissimmee) (formerly Fun Spot USA)
  - Fun Spot America (Orlando) (formerly Fun Spot Action Park)
- Fun Spot Amusement Park & Zoo, located in Angola, Indiana, closed in 2008
- Funspot (arcade), a video arcade and entertainment complex at Weirs Beach, Laconia, New Hampshire
