= Ingrid Mwangi =

Kenyan-German artist

- Born: 1975 (age 50–51); Nairobi, Kenya
- Education: Hochschule der Bildenden Künste Saar
- Spouse: Robert Hutter
- Children: 4
- Website: www.mwangihutter.com

Ingrid Mwangi (born 1975) is a German artist, of Kenyan-German descent. She works with photography, sculpture and in multimedia, performance, and installation art. In 2005, she co-founded Mwangi Hutter.

== Early life and education ==
Ingrid Njeri Mwangi was born in 1975 in Nairobi, Kenya to a German mother and a Kenyan father. She moved to Germany at the age of 15. She attended Hochschule der Bildenden Künste Saar in Saarbrücken, Germany, from 1996–2002 and studied Performance with Ulrike Rosenbach.

== Career ==
Mwangi works and lives in Berlin, Germany with her husband and collaborator Robert Hutter. They have four children.

Mwangi's work is concerned with social conventions and identity. She participated in the 2007 Brooklyn Museum exhibition Global Feminisms. Her 2001 series of photographs, Static Drift, was included. The work makes use of images evoking national and racial identities projected onto her body. Mwangi's 2000 work Neger Don't Call Me features photographs of her face covered with masks made from her dreadlocks.

=== Mwangi Hutter ===
In 2005, she and her husband Robert Hutter merged their biographies and names to form one artist, Mwangi Hutter. As a creative strategy to resist fixed notions of identity based upon gender, race, and cultural backgrounds, Mwangi Hutter strategically merged names and biographies to become one artist. They consciously use themselves as the sounding board to reflect on changing societal realities, creating an aesthetics of self-knowledge and interrelationship. Mwangi Hutter reflect on the subjects of border-crossing and finding identity, which both can be understood in a political, as well as a very personal, intimate sense. Their works can be seen as a vision of unification and the pacification of contrasts: female-male, African-European, black-white and the borders separating you and me.

== Exhibitions ==
=== Solo exhibitions ===
- 2002: Ingrid Mwangi - Stadtgalerie Saarbrücken, Saarbrücken, Germany
- 2006: Man of War - Video, Installation, Fotografie - Kunstverein Ingolstadt, Ingolstadt, Germany
- 2007: IngridMwangiRobertHutter: Select Videos, 2006-2007 - BRIC Rotunda Gallery, New York City, New York, United States
- 2007: MASK - James Cohan Gallery, New York City, New York, United States
- 2007: GOTH - Reality of the Departed World - Yokohama Museum of Art, Nishi-ku, Yokohama, Japan
- 2008: IngridMwangiRobertHutter - Along the Horizon - Galleria Il Trifoglio Nero, Genoa, Italy
- 2009: IngridMwangiRobertHutter: Masked - Emerson Gallery at Hamilton College, Clinton, New York, United States
- 2009: In the Eye of the Beholder - Darb 1718 Contemporary Art and Culture Center, Cairo, Egypt
- 2009: Intruders - Goethe-Institut Nairobi, Nairobi, Kenya
- 2009: Sleepers on the way - Goethe-Institut Tansania, Dar es Salaam, Tanzania
- 2011: Constant Triumph - Spelman College Museum of Fine Art, Atlanta, Georgia, United States
- 2013: Mwangi Hutter - Single Entities / @ Salon - ALEXANDER OCHS GALLERIES BERLIN | BEIJING, Berlin, China
