= Thomas Wagner (designer) =

German video game designer, entrepreneur and academic

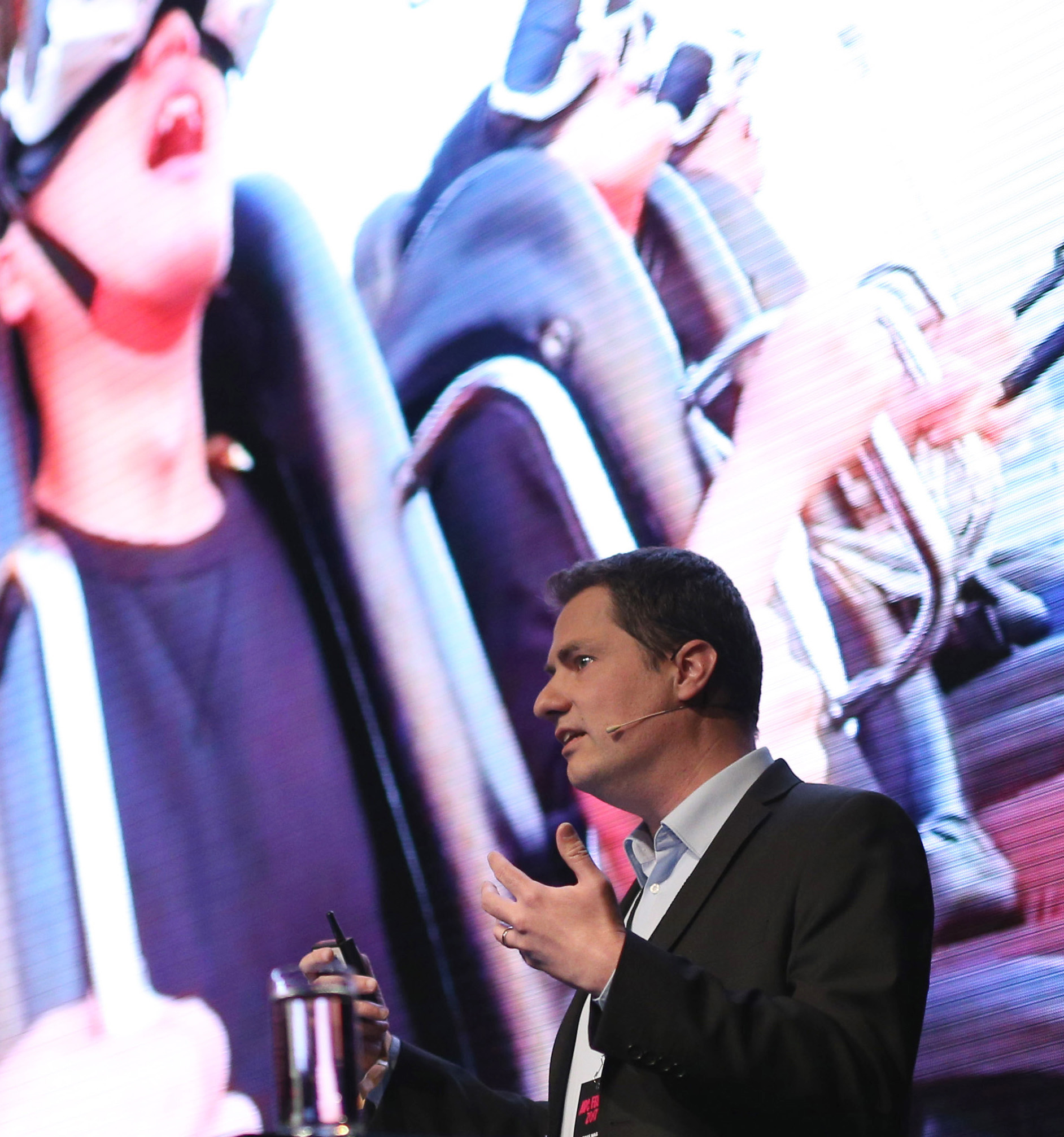
Thomas Wagner speaking at the Art Directors Club Festival 2017, Hamburg. Picture by Joern Pollex / Getty Images.

Thomas Wagner (born May 14, 1977) is a German video game designer, entrepreneur and professor. He is best known for his influence on the theme park industry as inventor of Virtual Reality equipped ride attractions like roller coasters. For his work in creating VR experiences on ride facilities, he is also considered a relevant personality of the VR Industry.

He is teaching as a professor in the study course of Virtual Design at the University of Applied Sciences, Kaiserslautern.

== Work ==
Wagner graduated in communication design at the Hochschule der Bildenden Künste Saar, Germany. In 2005, he was appointed Professor for Media- and Interaction Design at the University of Applied Sciences, Kaiserslautern. Until 2014, he focussed on video game design with his former company The Design Assembly GmbH and most recently with his games app label Gamesmold.

In early 2014, Wagner approached roller coaster manufacturer Mack Rides to investigate if Virtual Reality glasses would work on dynamic ride attractions. After initial test rides at Europa-Park, he conceived the solution of making a ride facility compatible to mobile VR headsets, which, at that time, had just been announced. Together with Mack Rides, he patented this process which solved common issues that would have prevented the use of PC-tethered headsets on a coaster train.

In May 2015, Wagner, Michael Mack and Mack Rides co-founded the company VR Coaster GmbH & Co. KG, owned in equal shares by the founders. Wagner is also CEO of the company, leading the creation of the VR media for these attractions.

In late 2015, their first public installation to use this technology opened at Europa-Park, which drew a lot of media attention. Subsequently, many installations followed worldwide, including drop towers, flat rides and bumper cars, with several of Wagners projects receiving critical acclaim in the industry. By 2020, his work was considered as having changed the entire attraction industry.

Wagner is a member of the Aurea Award Jury since the foundation of the Award in 2018.
