= Andrea Neumann (artist) =

German visual artist and educator (1969–2020)

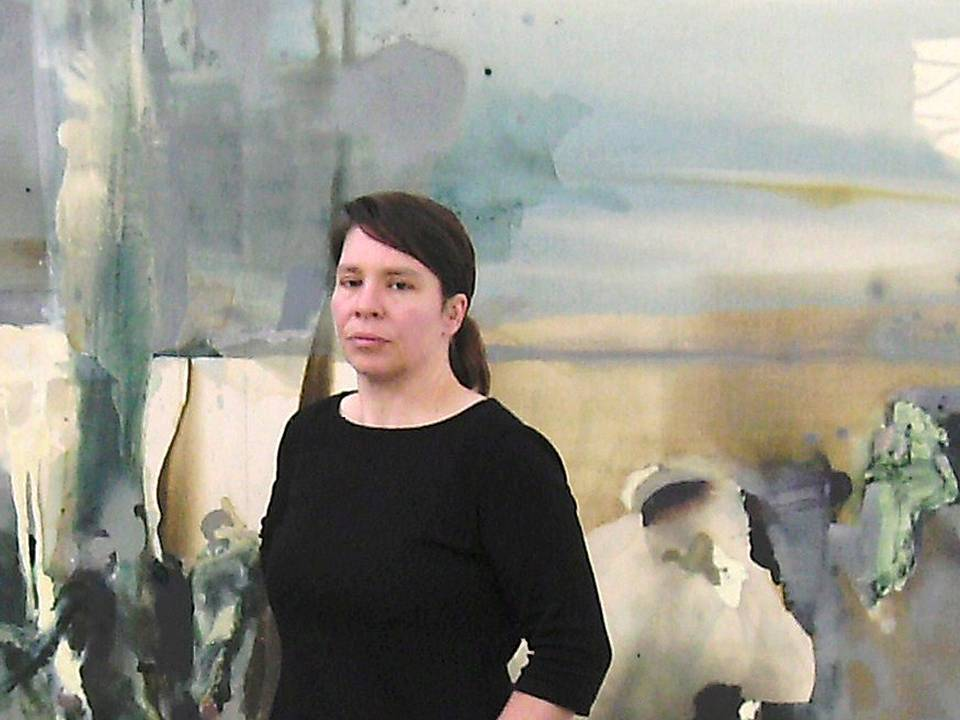
- Andrea Neumann (2012)
- Born: 5 June 1969; Stuttgart, Germany
- Died: 19 August 2020 (aged 51); Winnenden, Germany
- Education: Hochschule der Bildenden Künste Saar
- Website: www.andrea-neumann.de

Andrea Neumann (1969 – 2020) was a German visual artist and educator. She is one of the most important artists of the Saarland region. She is known for her abstract paintings.

== Biography ==
Andrea Neumann was born on 5 June 1969 in Stuttgart, Germany. She attended Hochschule der Bildenden Künste Saar (HBK) in Saarland from 1991 until 1996. At HBK, she studied under artists Bodo Baumgarten and Jo Enzweiler.

Neumann taught art classes periodically at HBK, after her graduation. In 1996, Neumann took over the leadership at ZiegenbART painting school in Saarbrücken. She was active in the Saarland Artists Association, and was on the Board for Saarland Artists House (German: Saarländischer Künstlerhaus).

Neumann often worked in egg tempera on canvas, creating portraits and works featuring groups of people.

She died on 19 August 2020 after a serious illness, at the age of 51. She was honored in 2021 with a posthumous exhibition at the Städtische Galerie Neunkirchen (English: Municipal Gallery Neunkirchen).

== Exhibitions ==
This is a select list of exhibitions for Neumann.

=== Solo exhibitions ===
- 2021 – Übergang, or Zeitspannen, (solo exhibition), Städtische Galerie Neunkirchen, Saar, Germany
- 2016 – abkommen, (solo exhibition), Städtische Galerie Neunkirchen, Saar, Germany
- 2012 – Vice Versa, (solo exhibition), Museum St. Wendel, Sankt Wendel, Germany

=== Group exhibitions ===
- 2017 – Histoires d’Art 1992, (group exhibition), Prix Pierre Werner, Cercle Cité, Luxembourg
- 2009 – Art Venture, (group exhibition), Galerię Miejską BWA, Bydgoszczy, Poland
