= White Lightning (roller coaster) =

Wooden roller coaster in Orlando, Florida, US

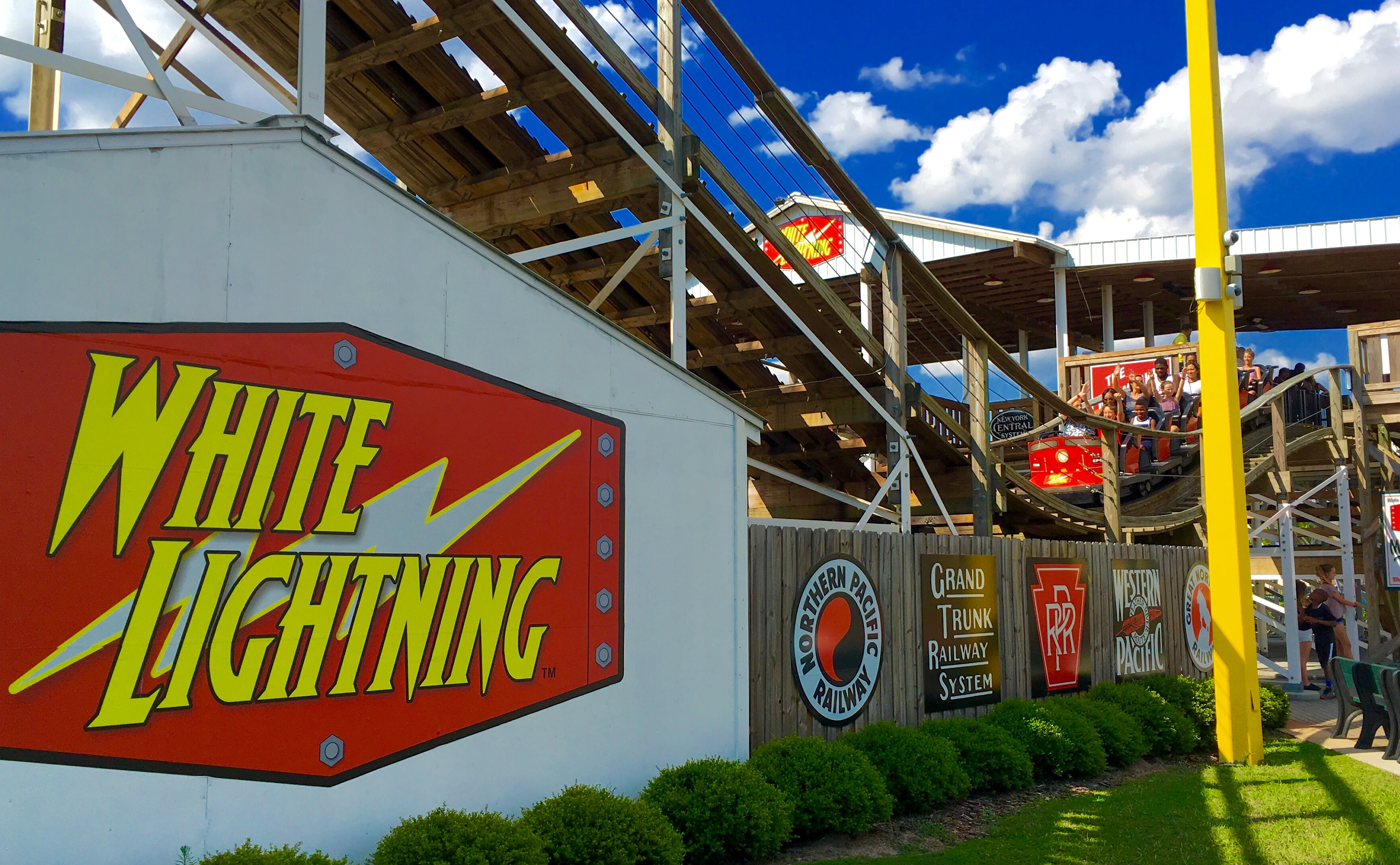
- White Lightning's Station

Fun Spot America
- Location: Fun Spot America
- Coordinates: 28.466155°N 81.456393°W
- Status: Operating
- Soft opening date: May 20, 2013
- Opening date: June 7, 2013
- Cost: $3.5 million

General statistics
- Type: Wood
- Manufacturer: Great Coasters International
- Model: Custom
- Track layout: Out and back
- Lift/launch system: Chain lift hill
- Height: 69.7 ft (21.2 m)
- Drop: 67.2 ft (20.5 m)
- Length: 2,032 ft (619 m)
- Speed: 44.3 mph (71.3 km/h)
- Inversions: 0
- Duration: 1:15
- Max vertical angle: 58°
- Height restriction: 46 in (117 cm)
- Trains: 2 trains with 6 cars; riders arranged 2 across in a single row for a total of 12 riders per train
- White Lightning at RCDB

White Lightning is a wooden roller coaster located at Fun Spot America amusement park in Orlando, Florida. Manufactured by Great Coasters International (GCI), White Lightning opened to the public on June 8, 2013, as the first wooden coaster to be built in Orlando. Unlike traditional wood designs, the support structure is made of steel to reduce maintenance costs, and it was the first time GCI incorporated the design into one of their coasters. White Lightning has also been well-received, consistently ranking in the top 50 among wooden roller coasters in the annual Golden Ticket Awards from Amusement Today.

== History ==
Fun Spot of Florida, Inc. announced that they purchased 10 acres (4.0 ha) adjacent to the north of their Fun Spot Action Park on December 30, 2010, with plans to triple the size of the park adding a number of new rides. The land purchase was necessitated as Fun Spot of Florida faced local competition and to keep up development with its sister park, Fun Spot USA. In the early planning stages, the park explored a Skycoaster, splash pad, and roller coasters as possible additions to the expansion lot. In April 2011, Fun Spot Action Park surveyed park guests about what types of attractions they would like at the park. Consensus published by the park indicated guests wanted water rides and roller coasters.

The Orlando Sentinel reported that three roller coaster representatives met with Fun Spot of Florida's chief operating officer, John Arie Jr., in August 2011. The report further stated the company planned to break ground in 2012 on the land purchased previously, which would include "at least one new roller coaster" among other attractions. Fun Spot announced it would rebrand its Orlando location as "Fun Spot America" and confirmed plans for the $20 million expansion. The expansion planned to incorporate a variety of attractions, as well as a steel and wooden roller coaster. Fun Spot officials reasoned to build two roller coasters to better establish themselves as an amusement park and to attract more guests.

Mark Brisson, director of marketing at Fun Spot, described the wooden roller coaster in a December 2011 interview as having a height less than 100 feet (30 m), designed and built by Great Coasters International (GCI), and located next to a road in an "L shaped" configuration. In March 2012, the Orlando City Commission approved the project, and the park released concept art of the expansion; in addition to a computer animated video of the GCI-designed roller coaster. Fun Spot of Florida filed a trademark with the United States Patent and Trademark Office for the name "White Lightning" in May 2012. Funding of the wooden roller coaster and other attractions were approved in June 2012.

After a one-year period of construction, White Lightning soft opened to the public on May 20, 2013. The park's official reopening ceremony was held on June 8, 2013. The $3.5 million ride opened as Orlando's first wooden roller coaster.

In September 2020, a small part of White Lightning was retracked with new prototype steel Titan Track by Great Coasters International.

== Ride experience ==
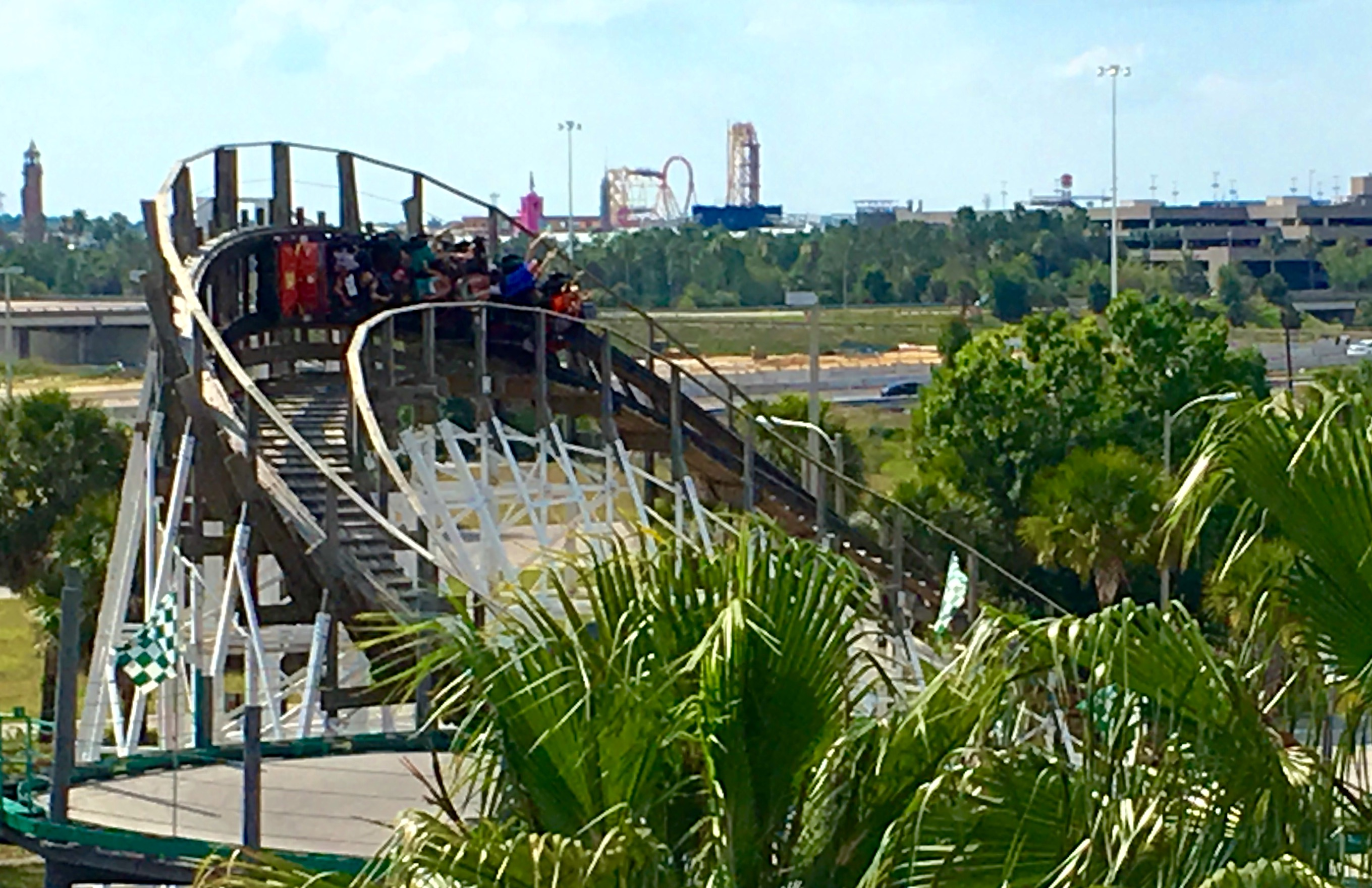
White Lightning's 90 degree bank turn back

White Lightning begins with a small dip out of the station and into the chain lift hill. Once at the top of the 69.7-foot (21.2 m) hill, the ride plunges 67.2 feet (20.5 m) to the left at an angle of 58°. The train then traverses a small high speed hill, before entering a double up followed by a double down. The train then inclines into a 90° banked curve that dives back to the ground, sending riders back in the direction they came. Several small hills lead the ride to the final brake run and subsequently the station.

== Characteristics ==
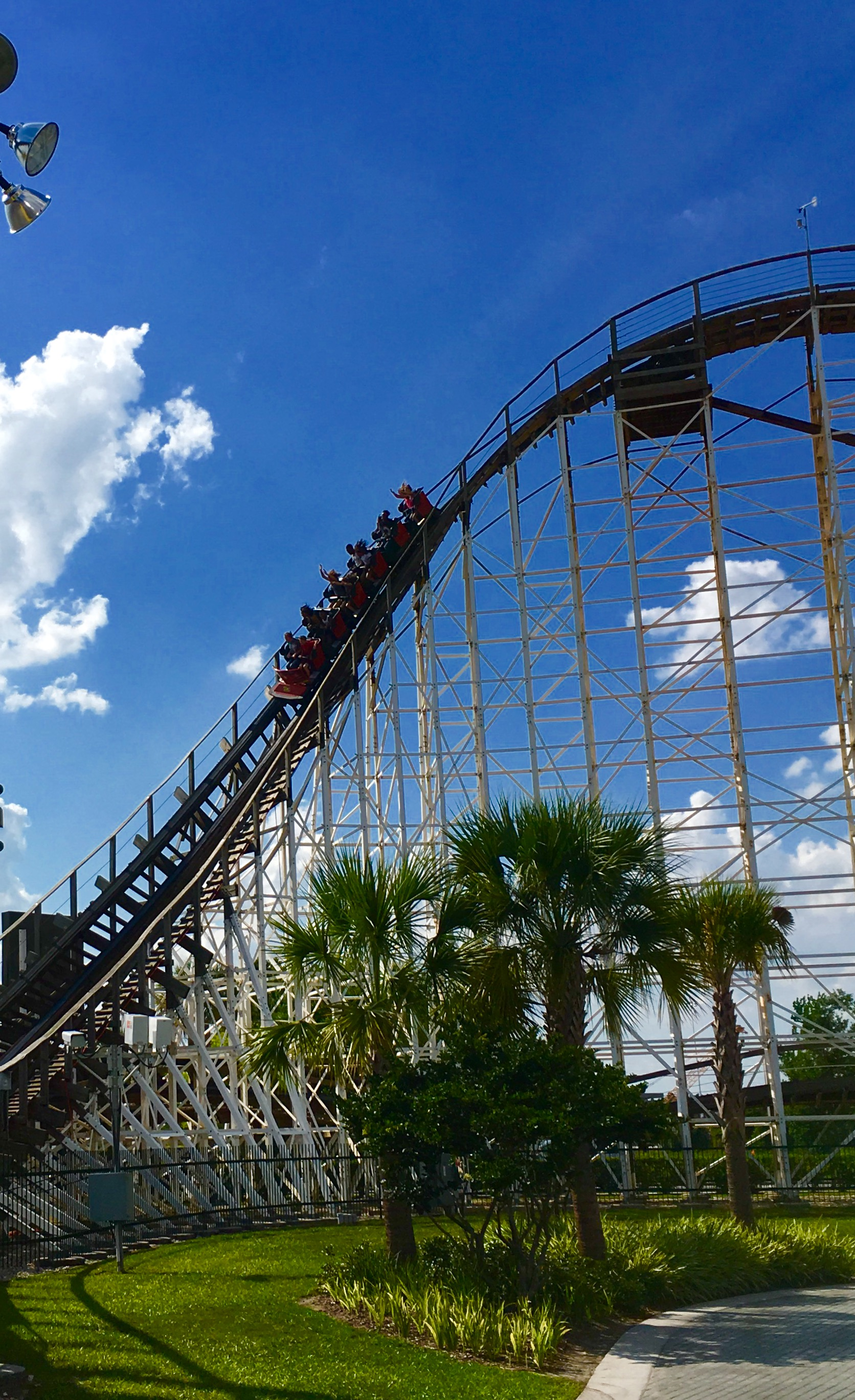
White Lightning's first drop

White Lightning is a wooden roller coaster designed by Pennsylvania-based manufacturer, Great Coasters International (GCI). The 2,032-foot-long (619 m) ride takes riders to a height of 69.7 feet (21.2 m) through the use of a chain lift hill. Riders reach a top speed of 44.3 miles per hour (71.3 km/h) on the 75-second ride. The ride operates with two Millennium Flyer trains. Each train is made up of six cars that seat pairs of riders. This is shorter than most GCI trains and allows for a faster paced ride. Riders, who must be over 46 inches (120 cm), are restrained in the padded seats via a lap bar.

The wooden-tracked ride features steel supports, a first for GCI. Wooden roller coasters ride differently to steel roller coasters, so it was necessary for GCI to design the track approximately 3 feet (0.91 m) above the steel support structure. Traditionally manufacturers would attach the track directly to steel supports. The steel support structure was requested by the park because it would require less maintenance than a wooden one, and it could be powder-coated to stand out in the park.

== Reception ==
White Lightning has been well received. Dewayne Bevil of the Orlando Sentinel stated the ride had "several 'Wow, this is fun' moments". Bevil described the ride as "smooth sailing" when compared to other wooden roller coasters, praising the ride for its many twists and air-time hills. Robb Alvey of Theme Park Review described the ride as "fast and fun" and that one shouldn't "judge it by its size". David Martin of WOFL stated he loved the ride and that the ride was a hit. Paul Ruben of Park World Magazine stated the ride is "not too big and it's not too small. It's just right." John Arie, the owner of Fun Spot, stated GCI delivered a ride that exceed his expectations, giving it an 11 out of 10.

Golden Ticket Awards: Top wood Roller Coasters
Year									1998	1999
Ranking									–	–
Year	2000	2001	2002	2003	2004	2005	2006	2007	2008	2009
Ranking	–	–	–	–	–	–	–	–	–	–
Year	2010	2011	2012	2013	2014	2015	2016	2017	2018	2019
Ranking	–	–	–	–	38 (tie)	40	34	18 (tie)	24	22
Year	2020	2021	2022	2023	2024	2025	2026			
Ranking	N/A	29	37	34	36	40	45 (tie)			

== See also ==
- Fun Spot America Theme Parks
- Freedom Flyer
- Mine Blower
