= Bahzad Sulaiman =

Kurdish visual artist in Syria

- Born: 23 January 1991 (age 35); Rmelan, Syria
- Education: Damascus University; Hochschule der Bildenden Künste Saar
- Known for: visual and performance artist
- Awards: 2022 Culture Prize of the Saarbrücken
- Website: https://bahzad.de/

Bahzad Sulaiman (born 23 January 1991) is a Kurdish visual artist and performance maker who worked as a lecturer at the Hochschule der Bildenden Künste Saar, in Saarbrücken, Germany. Born in Rmelan, in the northeast of Syria, Bahzad belongs to the Kurdish ethnic community. He is recipient of the 2022 Culture Prize of the Saarbrücken. His artwork was exhibited in numerous countries around the world including Austria, Canada, France, Germany, Netherlands, Serbia, Spain, Syria, Turkey and United Kingdom.

== Biography ==
Bahzad Sulaiman was born on 23 January 1991 in Rmelan, in the northeast of Syria in Kurdish family. His marginalized minority experience strongly influenced his artistic work. He studied scenography at the Higher Institute of Dramatic Arts, as well as Art at the Faculty of Fine Art of the Damascus University. He moved to Germany in 2016. His experience of relocation to Europe brought new contemporary influences into his artwork. From 2017 to 2019 he attended the Academy of Arts in Saarbrücken, where he completed a Master of Fine Art.

== Career ==
His interdisciplinary light installation at the Kunsthalle Mannheim in which he used old household appliances commented on the usage and disposal of electric appliances.

=== Exhibitions and Performances ===
- Civîn Performance, Regensburg, Germany (2023)
- International Forum, Berliner Festspiele, Germany (2022)
- Installation in public space, Lübeck, Germany (2021)
- Performance AnDeres, PLOPP Festival, Galerie der HBKsaar, Saarbrücken, Germany (2021)
- Performance ZWICHWN, Encore Festival, Theaterschiff Maria – Helena, Saarbrücken, Germany (2021)
- Solo exhibition ISO-BODY, AUTOMAT artspace, Saarbrücken, Germany (2021)
- You Are Not Alone: An International Mail Art Exhibition; Penticton Art Gallery, Canada (2020)
