= New Wave Rides =

American manufacturer

- Type: Private
- Industry: Manufacturing
- Founded: 1984
- Founder: Bill Crandall
- Headquarters: Grapevine, Texas, USA
- Area served: Worldwide
- Products: Water slides

New Wave Rides was an American manufacturer of water rides. They manufactured water slides and water slide complexes.

== History ==
From 1975 - 1981, Bill Crandall was the general manager of AstroWorld. In 1979, Crandall partnered with Intamin to create the first river rapids ride, Thunder River. After the ride's debut season, 1980, was complete, Crandall decided to start his own consulting business, Crandall & Associates. In January 1984, his company had been contracted to supervise Frontier City amusement park. They developed a water slide attraction called Riptide, which was installed in the park in the fall of 1984. In November 1984, Crandall & Associates founded New Wave Rides, with Riptide as its debut attraction. The company sold its second ride, called Thunder Falls, to Frontier City, which opened in 1985.

== Partial List of Attractions ==
=== Operating ===
Name	Location	Season opened	Season closed	Type	Ref(s)
Riptide	Frontier City	1984	1997	Water slide	
Riptide	Six Flags America	1998	Operating	Water slide	

=== Closed ===
Name	Location	Season opened	Season closed	Type	Ref(s)
Thunder Falls	Frontier City	1985	Unknown	Water slide	
Riptide	Fun 'N Wheels	1985	1988	Water slide	
Racing Rivers - Riptide	Kings Dominion	1987	1996	Water slide	
Frontier Chute-Out	Hersheypark	1988	1998	Slide complex	
The Python Plunge	Worlds of Fun	1988	1999	Slide complex	
Wild River Falls	Riverside Amusement Park	1989	1996	Slide complex	
Torpedo Rapids	Darien Lake	1990	1998	Water slide	
Racing Rivers	Six Flags AstroWorld	1991	Unknown	Water slide	
The African Tower	Six Flags Great Adventure	1991	1998	Slide complex	
The Asian Tower	Six Flags Great Adventure	1991	1998	Slide complex	
The North American Tower	Six Flags Great Adventure	1991	1998	Slide complex	
Adventure Rivers of Texas	Six Flags AstroWorld	1992	2005	River raft ride	
