= Mine Blower =

Wooden roller coaster in Orlando, Florida

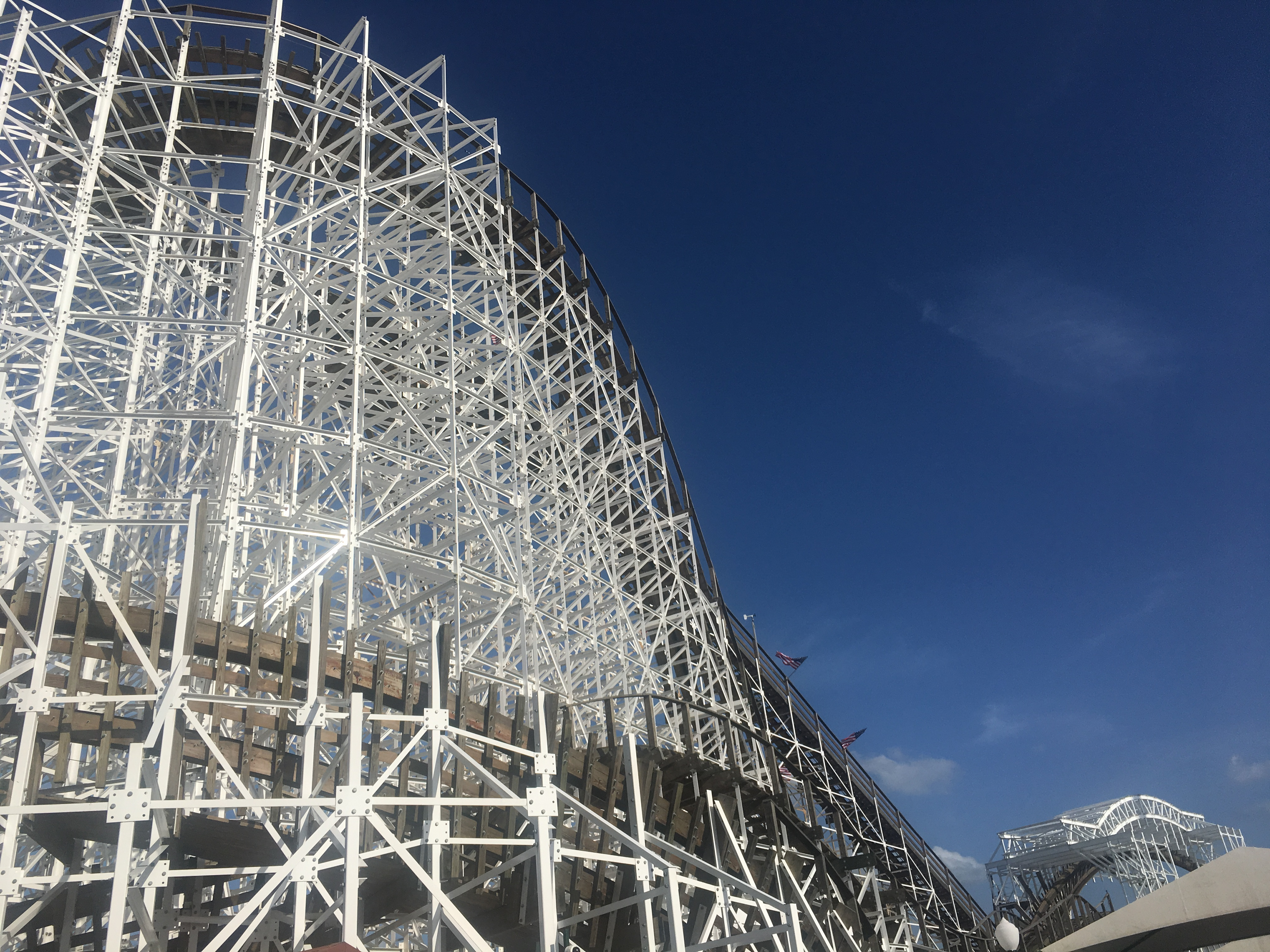
- Mine Blower

Fun Spot America (Kissimmee)
- Location: Fun Spot America (Kissimmee)
- Coordinates: 28.3303512°N 81.5146559°W
- Status: Operating
- Opening date: June 23, 2017
- Cost: $6,000,000
- Replaced: Go-Karts

General statistics
- Type: Wood
- Manufacturer: The Gravity Group
- Lift/launch system: Chain lift hill
- Height: 83 ft (25 m)
- Drop: 80.5 ft (24.5 m)
- Length: 2,290 ft (700 m)
- Speed: 48.5 mph (78.1 km/h)
- Inversions: 1
- Max vertical angle: 65°
- Height restriction: 48 in (122 cm)
- Trains: 2 trains with 6 cars. Riders are arranged 2 across in a single row for a total of 12 riders per train.
- Mine Blower at RCDB

Mine Blower is a wooden roller coaster located at Fun Spot America Kissimmee, in Kissimmee, Florida, United States. Manufactured by The Gravity Group, the compact hybrid coaster is one of only three wooden roller coasters in Florida, the others being White Lightning at Fun Spot America Orlando and Coastersaurus at Legoland Florida. Features of the ride include a zero-gravity roll above the station area, as well as a 115° overbanked turn.

== History ==
In December 2016, it was speculated that Fun Spot America Kissimmee was going to build a new roller coaster for $6 million. The name for the attraction was announced on February 5, 2017, during the 2017 Super Bowl. In May 2017, parts of the roller coaster were revealed during construction, including the 115° overbanked turn. On June 15, 2017, it was announced that Mine Blower would be opening later in the month. Mine Blower opened to the public eight days later, on June 23.

== Ride experience ==
The ride starts with a mild 180° turn to the left, taking it straight into the lift hill. It takes approximately 23 seconds to ascend before the ride hits another 180° turnaround to the left, and plunges just over 80 feet before going into the only inversion, a zero-gravity roll. Then, it goes into the first high speed turnaround of many to the left, leading straight up an airtime hill that's followed by a "double down", then passing another bunny hill, and into a right hand turnaround. Two more small hills follow, and then goes towards the 115° over-banked turn to the right. A few more curvy airtime hills sprint the train towards a low lying, left hand turnaround, up another two hills, and into the brake run.

Mine Blower is one of 8 wooden roller coasters with at least one inversion as of its construction.

== Characteristics ==
=== Support structure ===
Mine Blower is a Gravity Group wooden roller coaster that is built with a steel support structure.

=== Trains ===
Mine Blower utilizes two custom themed "Timberliner" trains that seat 12 passengers each. The train front consists of a firework and dynamite figurehead.

=== Statistics ===
Mine Blower is 2,290 feet (700 m) long, 83 feet (25 m) tall, and reaches a top speed of 48.5 mph (78 km/h). This is currently the longest, tallest, and fastest of the three operating wooden coasters in Florida.

== Reception ==
Golden Ticket Awards: Best New Ride for 2017
Ranking	3

Golden Ticket Awards: Top wood Roller Coasters
Year									1998	1999
Ranking									–	–
Year	2000	2001	2002	2003	2004	2005	2006	2007	2008	2009
Ranking	–	–	–	–	–	–	–	–	–	–
Year	2010	2011	2012	2013	2014	2015	2016	2017	2018	2019
Ranking	–	–	–	–	–	–	–	–	48	–
Year	2020	2021	2022	2023	2024	2025				
Ranking	N/A	–	–	–	–	–				

Note: Mine Blower has not charted in the Golden Ticket Awards since 2018.

== See also ==
- 2017 in amusement parks
