= Hochschule der Bildenden Künste Saar =

University in Saarland, Germany

Coordinates: 49°13′57″N 6°59′6″E

Saar College of Fine Arts
- Hochschule der Bildenden Künste Saar
- Other names: University of Art and Design Saarbrücken
- Type: Public university
- Established: 1989; 37 years ago
- President: Gabriele Langendorf
- Administrative staff: 50 (full professors/teacher for special tasks)
- Students: 500
- Location: Saarbrücken, Germany
- Campus: Urban
- Website: hbksaar.de

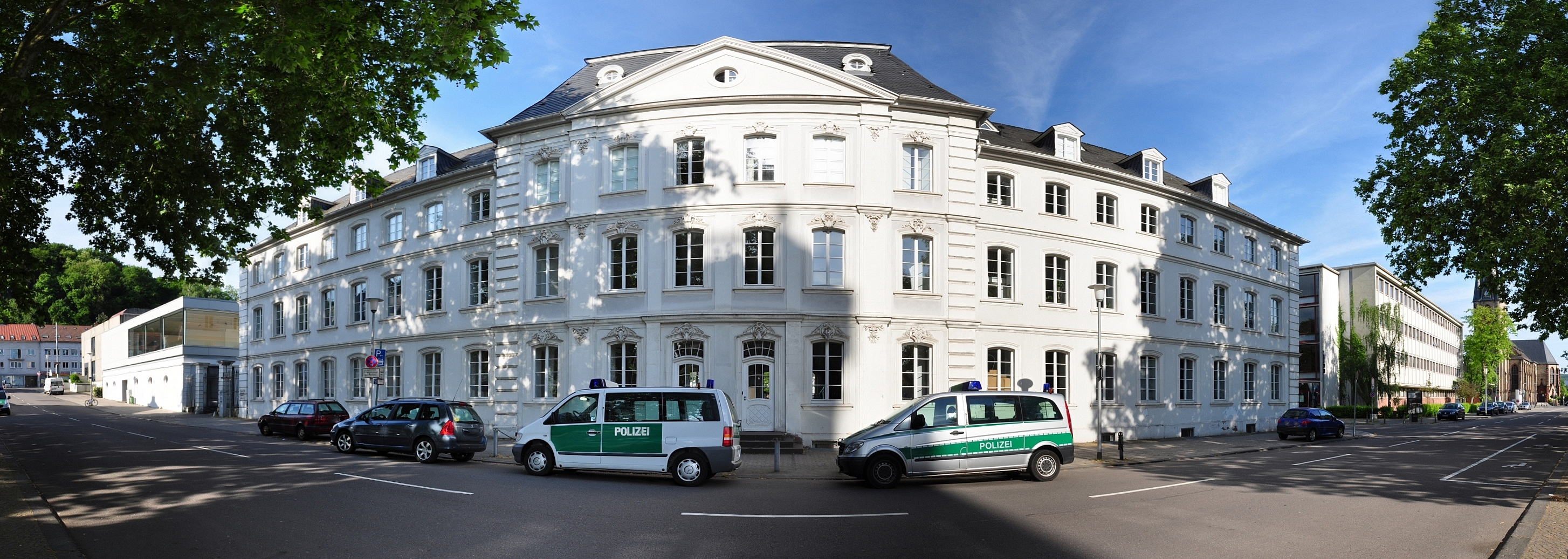
HBKsaar campus

The Hochschule der Bildenden Künste Saar or HBKsaar, (English: Saar College of Fine Arts) is an art and design university in the German State of Saarland.

The degree course offers a choice of different topics: Fine arts, communication design, media art & design and product design. There are also various master study programmes and teacher training programmes in art education.

== History ==
The Hochschule der Bildenden Künste Saar (HBKsaar) was formally established as an independent institution in 1989 through legislation enacted by the state of Saarland. Its foundation marked the continuation and restructuring of earlier art and design education in the region, particularly from the postwar Schule für Kunst und Handwerk, which had operated within the former Fachhochschule des Saarlandes since the 1970s.

The new institution was led by artist and educator Jo Enzweiler as its first rector. Under his leadership, HBKsaar adopted a project-oriented, interdisciplinary academic model that remains central to its curriculum. The university's main building, the Comeniushaus (named after John Amos Comenius), is located in central Saarbrücken. The baroque structure, originally constructed in the late 18th century and rebuilt after damage in World War II, has housed the art school since its founding.

In addition to its central campus, HBKsaar maintains studios and workshops in Völklingen, particularly for sculpture and spatial art. These facilities are located within the grounds of the former Völklingen Ironworks, a UNESCO World Heritage Site, with expanded infrastructure added in the early 2000s.

HBKsaar is also affiliated with the Institute for Contemporary Art in Saarland (Institut für aktuelle Kunst im Saarland), which operates under the university's institutional framework. As of 2021, Christian Bauer serves as the rector of the university.

== Study ==
HBKsaar offers undergraduate and graduate degree programs across artistic, design, and teaching disciplines, structured within a modular credit system.

=== Bachelor's and diploma programs ===
The following foundational (Bachelor or Diploma) programs are available after an initial common semester in visual arts fundamentals:

- Freie Kunst (Fine Arts) – B.A. or diploma, typically 8 semesters for B.A., 10 for diploma
- Kommunikationsdesign (Communication Design) – B.A. or diploma, 8–10 semesters
- Produktdesign (Product Design) – B.A. or diploma
- Media Art & Design – B.A. or diploma
- Kunsterziehung (Art Education) – state exam path over 8–10 semesters, covering art didactics and two teaching subjects

=== Master's programs ===
Several consecutive Master of Arts programs build on these undergraduate degrees:

- Freie Kunst
- Kommunikationsdesign
- Produktdesign
- Media Art & Design

Specialized master's programs (60 ECTS, typically one year) include:

- Experimental Media
- Kuratieren/Ausstellungswesen (Curating & Exhibition Management)
- Museumspädagogik (Museum Education)
- Quereinstieg Lehramt Bildende Kunst (M.Ed. for Art Education)
- Public Art/Public Design
- Kulturmanagement (in cooperation with HTW Saar and HfM Saar)

=== Postgraduate and doctoral study ===
- Meisterschüler*innen-Studium – a postgraduate "master student" program following completion of a bachelor, diploma, or master degree
- Promotion (PhD) – HBKsaar holds the right to award a Doctor of Philosophy (Dr. phil.)

=== Admission and structure ===
- All degree programs require successful completion of an entrance aptitude test (Eignungsprüfung)
- The bachelor's program typically spans eight semesters (diploma: ten semesters); master's programs are usually one to two semesters (max two years)
- The first semester for undergraduate entrants is common across all disciplines (Grundlagenstudium), after which students specialize

== Facilities ==
HBKsaar operates across several locations with dedicated spaces for artistic education:

- Comeniushaus, Saarbrücken – Housed in a baroque landmark reconstructed after WWII, this main campus includes administrative offices, libraries, archives, seminar rooms, and workshops for photography, wood, metal, model-making, printing, and digital media. It also features video and sound studios, faculty ateliers, a cafeteria, and an adjacent "E-Haus" extension for additional studios and media facilities.
- Völklingen Ironworks site (UNESCO World Heritage, ~10 km away) – Since 1989, students have used studios and workshops for sculpture, spatial arts, and experimental media within this former industrial complex. A programme of expansion in 2003 added seminar rooms, project spaces, guest ateliers, and specialized laboratories.
- Institute for Contemporary Art in Saarland, Saarlouis – This affiliated institution provides facilities for exhibitions, archiving, and research under the HBKsaar framework.
- HBKsaar Gallery (since 2010) – Located in Saarbrücken, the university gallery hosts student and external artist exhibitions, promoting contemporary curatorial practice.

These facilities support HBKsaar's interdisciplinary, project-based academic model across multiple artistic media.

== Noted alumni ==
- Arvid Boecker (born 1964), color field painter
- Wolfgang Kermer (born 1935), art historian and former rector of the State Academy of Fine Arts Stuttgart, studied in 1956/57 with Peter Raacke, Oskar Holweck and Otto Steinert
- Ingrid Mwangi (born 1975) also known as "Mwangi Hutter", multidisciplinary artist, known for performance art
- Andrea Neumann (1969–2020) painter
- Bahzad Sulaiman (born 1991) Kurdish performance maker and visual artist
- Thomas Wagner (born 1977) VR and video game designer, entrepreneur

== Noted faculty ==
- Bodo Baumgarten, painter
- Andreas Brandolini, architect and designer
- Jo Enzweiler, painter
- Christina Kubisch, composer, sound artist, performance artist
- Frans Masereel, Flemish painter and graphic artist, taught at HBK from 1949 to 1949.
- Cho Sung-hyung, film maker
- Georg Winter, visual artist
- Tamás Waliczky, multidisciplinary media artist, computer animator, cartoonist, illustrator.
- Barbara Yelin (born 1977), cartoonist
