= Freedom Flyer =

Roller coaster

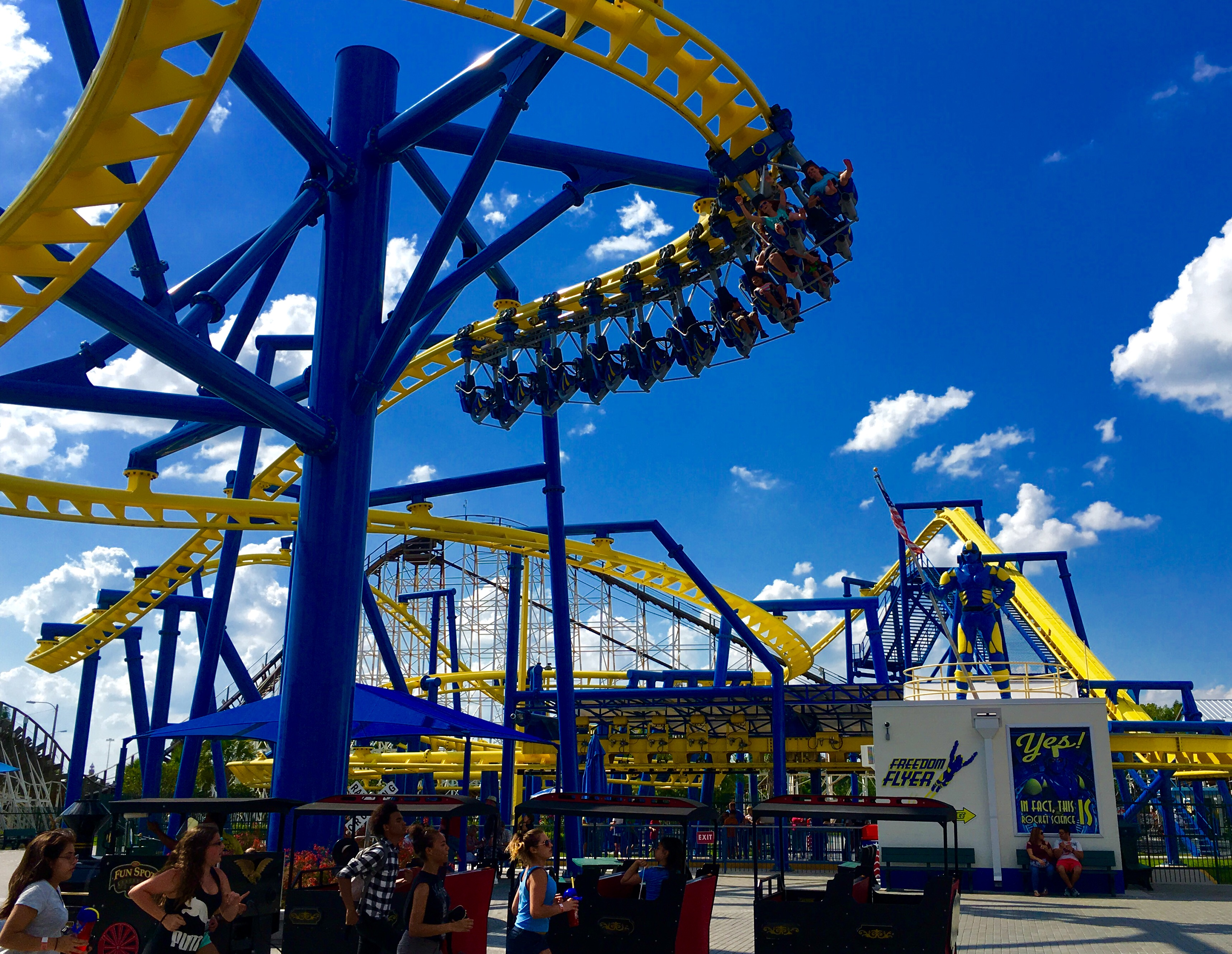
- Fun Spot America Orlando's Freedom Flyer Coaster

Fun Spot America
- Location: Fun Spot America
- Coordinates: 28.4661863°N 81.4560572°W
- Status: Operating
- Soft opening date: May 13, 2013
- Opening date: June 8, 2013
- Cost: USD$ 5.5 million

General statistics
- Type: Steel – Family – Suspended Family Coaster
- Manufacturer: Vekoma
- Model: Suspended Family Coaster (395m)
- Track layout: Twister
- Lift/launch system: Drive tire
- Height: 64.3 ft (19.6 m)
- Length: 1,295.9 ft (395.0 m)
- Speed: 34.2 mph (55.0 km/h)
- Inversions: 0
- Duration: 1:03
- Capacity: 758 riders per hour
- G-force: 2.5
- Height restriction: 36 in (91 cm)
- Trains: Single train with 10 cars. Riders are arranged 2 across in a single row for a total of 20 riders per train.
- Freedom Flyer at RCDB

Freedom Flyer is a Suspended Family Coaster at the Fun Spot America amusement park in Orlando, Florida. It has yellow track and blue supports. It was manufactured by Vekoma and opened in May 2013.

== History ==
On December 31, 2010, Fun Spot Action Park announced that they purchased an additional 10 acres (4.0 ha) adjacent to the park, with plans to triple the size of the park adding a number of new rides. In April 2011, Fun Spot Action Park surveyed park guests about what types of attractions they would like at the park. Consensus published by the park indicated they wanted water rides and roller coasters. In August 2011, the Orlando Sentinel revealed that the park had contacted at least three roller coaster manufacturers. In November 2011, it was confirmed that the park would receive two roller coasters: one wood and one steel. The coaster soft-opened in May 2013.

During the 2015 International Association of Amusement Parks and Attractions (IAAPA) Trade Show in Orlando, Freedom Flyer was used to demonstrate Virtual Reality Technology on roller coasters. By wearing a VR headset during the ride, speed, dimensions as well as theming can be vastly extended in the simulated environment, while still experiencing the real g-forces and air-time moments of the actual ride. As of the December 16, 2016, the Virtual Reality aspect was introduced permanently to the attraction.

== Ride experience ==
Freedom Flyer's layout starts with a 90 degree turn into a short, 64 foot (20 m) Lift hill. after ascending the lift hill, the ride transitions into a curved drop and an mild hill, then turning into a series of banked turns overlooking the entrance to the park. Afterwards, the ride proceeds into a double helix, concluding the ride and sending the ride vehicle to the station. Throughout the course of the ride, there are multiple "foot choppers" (support beams that draw near to the rider's feet, giving the illusion that the rider's legs are going to be chopped off, hence the name "foot chopper"). The ride is 1,295 feet (395 m) long.

== See also ==
- Fun Spot America Theme Parks
- White Lightning (roller coaster)
