= Bodo Baumgarten =

German painter

- Born: 25 November 1940; Gdynia, West Prussia, Nazi Germany
- Died: 13 September 2022 (aged 81); Hamburg, Germany
- Education: Muthesius Academy of Art, University of Fine Arts of Hamburg

Bodo Baumgarten (25 November 1940 – 13 September 2022) was a German painter, sculptor, graphic artist, and educator. He is a former professor at Hochschule der Bildenden Künste Saar (HBK) in Saarland.

== Biography ==
Bodo Baumgarten was born on 25 November 1940 in Gdynia, West Prussia (now Poland). He grew up in Schleswig-Holstein and Hamburg in Germany.

Baumgarten studied painting at the Muthesius Academy of Art (German: Muthesius Kunsthochschule Kiel) from 1962 to 1965; under Hans Domke and Gottfried Brockmann. Baumgarten continued his studies from 1965 to 1969 at the University of Fine Arts of Hamburg, where he started teaching while completing his studies.

In 1977, Baumgarten participated in documenta 6, a contemporary art exhibition. In 1981, Baumgarten moved to Cologne, Germany, where he maintains his present-day studio.

He taught painting at the Hochschule der Bildenden Künste Saar (HBK) from 1989 until 2006. Baumgarten had many notable students, including Andrea Neumann.

== See also ==
- List of German painters
