= Ulrike Rosenbach =

German artist

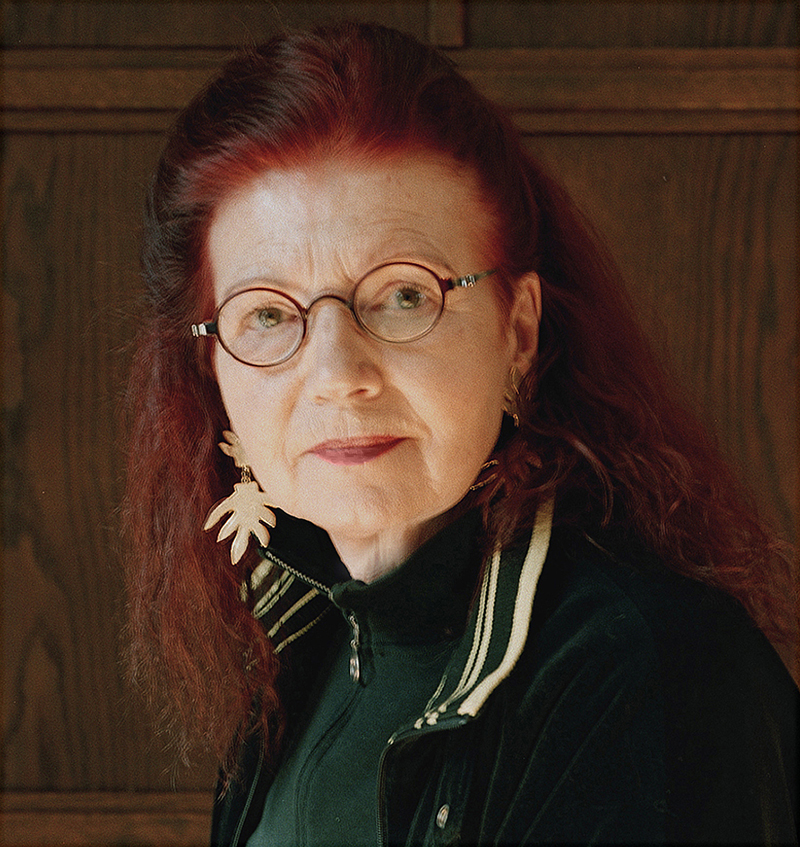
- Rosenbach (2013)
- Born: 1943 (age 82–83); Bad Salzdetfurth, Germany
- Education: Düsseldorf Academy of Fine Arts
- Website: ulrike-rosenbach.de

Ulrike Rosenbach (born 1943) is a video artist from Germany. Rose Bach works with videotapes, installations and performances. She was one of the first artists from Germany to use video for experiments with electronic images. Her videotapes critique the traditional representation of women and help formulate the identity of women from a feminist perspective.

== Biography ==
Rosenbach was born in 1943 in Bad Salzdetfurth in Hildesheim, Germany. She trained as a sculptor at the Düsseldorf Academy of Fine Arts from 1964 to 1969. Rosenbach began working professionally in 1971 when she created her first video work. She taught feminist art and media art at the California Institute of the Arts in Valencia, California. Rosenbach returned to Germany and founded the School for Creative Feminism in Cologne. In 1972, she started to use video to document her life. In her films she shows patterns of female identity and strategies of self-determination. Rosenbach also participated in the 1977 and 1987 editions of the exhibition documenta in the city of Kassel. In 1989 she became a professor of New Media Arts at the Academy of Fine Arts in Saarbruken, Germany. In July 2007 she retired from the university and began working as a freelance artist in the Cologne-Bonn area and in the Saarland. Since November 2012 Rosenbach has been the president and the first chairman of the German arts association GEDOK.

== Themes ==
Rosenbach's work has largely been concerned with the depiction of womanhood in art. Having joined the German women’s movement in the late 1960s, she travelled internationally to participate in feminist performance activities in association with the Woman’s Building in Los Angeles in the 1970s. Beginning to perform ritual actions in 1969, she experimented with using her body as a medium of expression and video as a recording and documenting device. In her work, she probes “the patriarchal basis of art history, its mythological presentations of women, the damage such stereotypes cause to women’s identity and creativity, and the strength of women to constitute the forms of their own visual representations and identity.”

Having studied Buddhism and other esoteric topics, Rosenbach valued intellectual depth and was interested in exploring the psychic and spiritual dimensions of experience.

== Awards and recognition ==
- 1977 Prize of North Rhine-Westphalia for young artists
- 2004 Gabriele Munter Prize
