= Fun Spot America Theme Parks =

Amusement parks in Florida

- Previously known as: Fun Spot Action Park (Orlando); Fun Spot USA (Kissimmee)
- Location: Orlando, Florida, US
- Status: Operating
- Owner: John Arie Sr. and family
- Theme: Americana
- Operating season: Year round
- Area: Orlando: 14 acres (5.7 ha); Kissimmee: 9 acres (3.6 ha)

Attractions
- Total: 27 (Orlando); 23 (Kissimmee)
- Roller coasters: 3 (Orlando); 4 (Kissimmee)
- Website: Official website

Fun Spot America Orlando
- Coordinates: 28.4653543°N 81.4556994°W
- Status: Operating
- Opened: December 24, 1997

Fun Spot America Kissimmee
- Coordinates: 28.3302485°N 81.5146852°W
- Status: Operating
- Opened: June 2, 2007

Fun Spot America Theme Parks is a company that owns 2 amusement parks in Florida, with locations in Orlando, Florida and Kissimmee, Florida. The company was founded by John Arie Sr. and traces its roots back to a Fun 'n Wheels location that opened in Orlando in 1979. Arie opened the first Fun Spot location in 1990, two years after selling the Fun 'n Wheels park franchise. He returned to Orlando in 1997 with the opening of the company's flagship park on International Drive. In 2013, the Orlando location underwent a $25 million expansion, increasing by 10 acres (4.0 ha) and adding two roller coasters. The company continued to grow with the addition of a third location outside of Atlanta in Fayetteville, Georgia, in 2017 (the park closed in 2026).

== History ==
In 1979, John Arie Sr. opened a family entertainment center (FEC) under the name Fun 'n Wheels near the I-Drive tourist corridor in Orlando, Florida. The flagship attraction of the 3-acre (1.2 ha) park was its go-kart track, and the name was inspired by the nearby Wet 'n Wild water park, from SeaWorld co-founder George Millay, which opened two years earlier in 1977. Although Fun 'n Wheels was situated a lot away from I-Drive on the corner of Sand Lake Road and lacked direct access to main roads, the business proved successful and rapidly expanded into what was billed as the "world’s first themed action park".

The park premiered new ride concepts, such as a 40-foot (12 m) water slide called Raging Riptide, manufactured by New Wave Rides. The wet/dry water slide design was a popular concept that quickly became a staple at water parks across the country in the 1980s. In addition to water slides and three go-kart tracks, the park also featured an arcade, a miniature golf course, bumper cars, bumper boats, and a 55-foot-tall (17 m) Ferris wheel.

A second Fun 'n Wheels location opened in Kissimmee, Florida in 1988. Shortly after the Kissimmee location's opening, both Fun 'n Wheels parks were sold to Pleasurama USA, a subsidiary of London-based Pleasurama PLC. Arie stated that he sold the parks to company president Robert Earl "under a promise that he would take my concept, my plan, and expand it". However, Pleasurama would instead heavily invest and divert its attention toward the Hard Rock Cafe brand it acquired two months later in July 1988. Under terms of the sale, Arie entered a three-year agreement to manage the Fun 'n Wheels locations through 1991, both of which permanently closed by 2002.

In 1990, Arie began a new amusement park chain under the brand Fun Spot America, with the opening of a location in Myrtle Beach, South Carolina. He opened a second location two years later in Virginia Beach, Virginia. Both ceased operations by 1998, as Arie turned his attention back to Orlando.

=== Return to Orlando ===
Once a non-compete clause from the 1988 sale expired, Arie returned to the Orlando area with the opening of Fun Spot America on December 24, 1997. The $4-million park was built on 4.7 acres (1.9 ha) on the north end of I-Drive, relatively close to the original Fun 'n Wheels location. It debuted a new, patented go-kart elevated track design featuring three levels – considered the second of its kind – that was inspired by elevated tracks at Big Chief Carts & Coasters, owned by Nick Laskaris, in Wisconsin Dells, Wisconsin. Laskaris and Arie became friends and shared ideas that led to four Fun Spot patents. The park also included a 102-foot-tall (31 m) Ferris wheel and a two-story video arcade among other attractions.

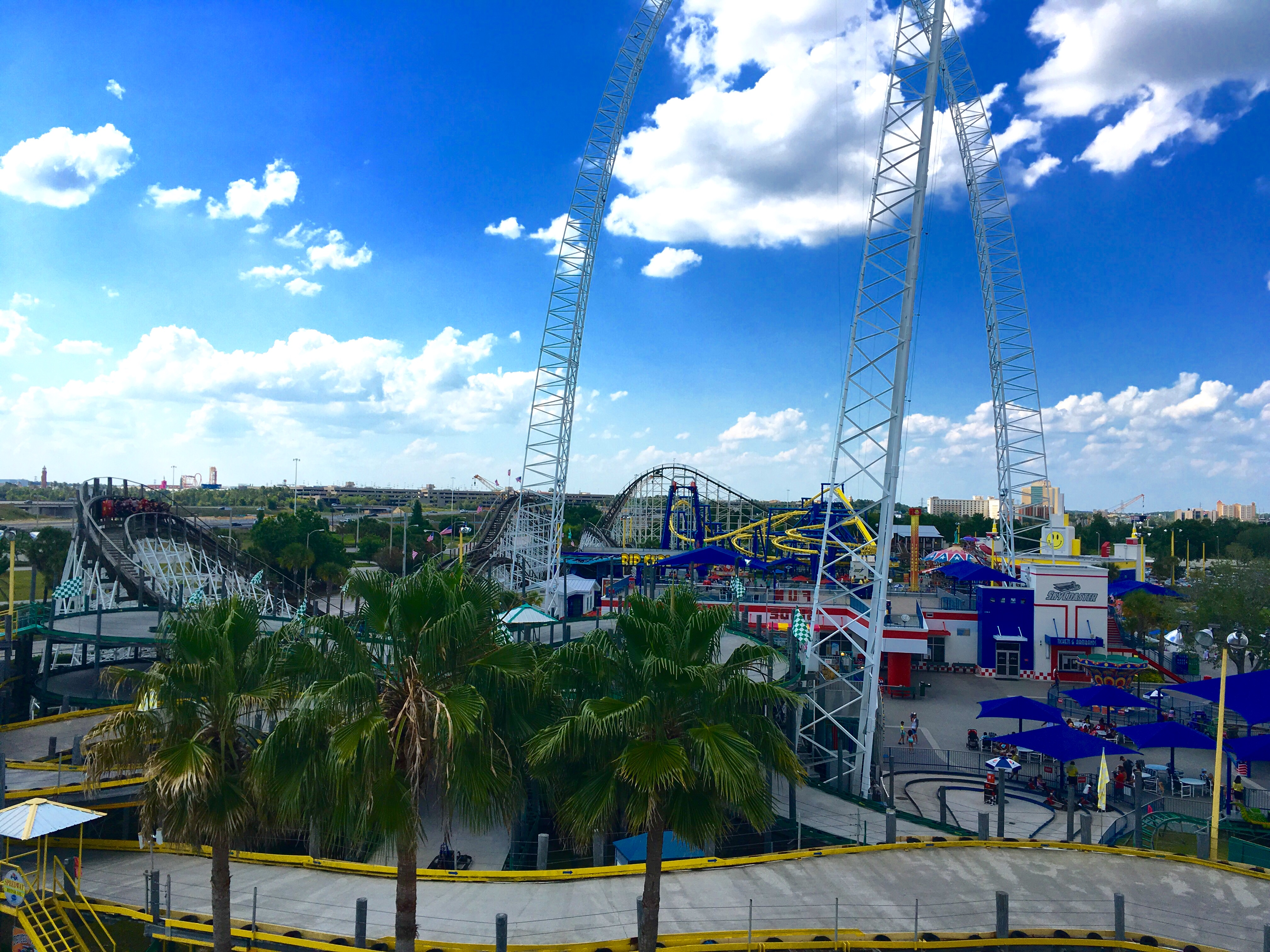
The 10-acre expansion to the renamed Fun Spot America Orlando park

In 2010, Fun Spot purchased an additional 10 acres (4.0 ha) of vacant land next to their Orlando location. 2011 was spent researching nearly 30 parks and 50 roller coasters across the country planning a major expansion of the park. Late in 2011, they met with three professional roller coaster salesmen. Ground was broken in 2012 for the expansion that tripled the size of Fun Spot Action Park, turning it into Fun Spot America – Orlando.

$25 million was spent on two new roller coasters, the world's second tallest Skycoaster (second only to their Kissimmee location), and numerous other attractions. The two coasters are the wooden out and back roller coaster White Lightning and the Suspended Family Coaster Freedom Flyer. The skycoaster came from MGM Grand Adventures in Las Vegas, where it had been disassembled in storage for eight years. It is now the centerpiece of the park. Additional improvements include three new thrill rides, a new multi-level go-kart track, a new food court, a new ticket booth, additional parking, and rest rooms. A grand re-opening was held on June 8, 2013, celebrating the tripling of size of the park, as well as its 15th anniversary.

=== 2015–present ===
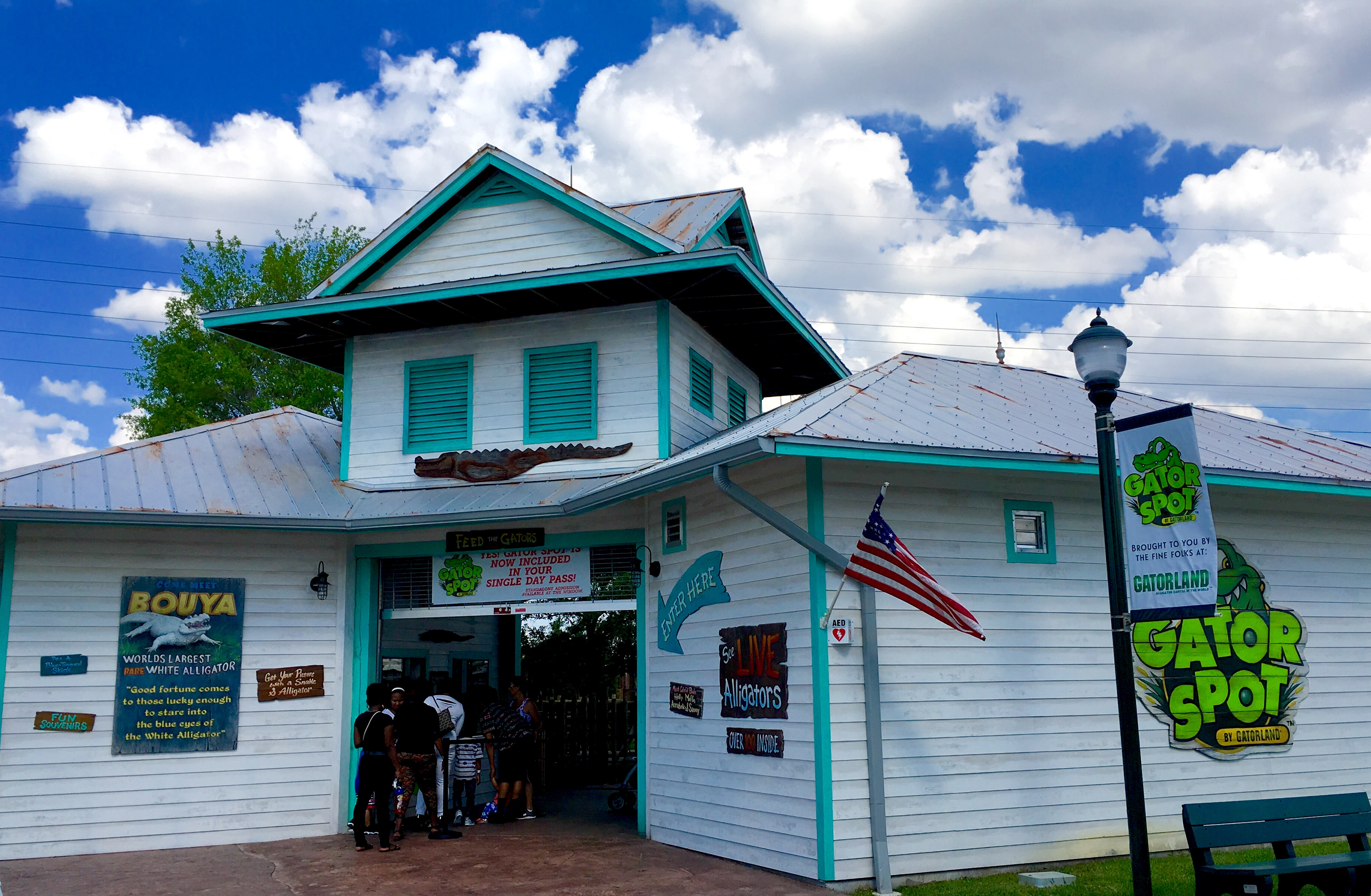
Gator Spot Entrance at Fun Spot America Orlando

Fun Spot, in collaboration with Gatorland, opened Gator Spot at the Orlando park on May 11, 2015. The $1 million attraction allows Gatorland to extend their brand to the I-Drive tourist area, with visitors able to hold, take photos with, and feed alligators. The star of the attraction is a leucistic alligator named Bouya, a white gator with blue eyes.

Fun Spot America opened a new location in 2017 on Highway 85 outside of Atlanta in Fayetteville, Georgia. The site was previously a Fun Junction USA park purchased by Fun Spot America. In June 2026, it was announced that Fun Spot America Atlanta would close permanently on August 2, 2026.

== Attractions ==
=== Orlando location ===
Fun Spot America – Orlando is an amusement park in Orlando, Florida, near Universal Orlando and I-Drive. It has four go-kart tracks and three roller coasters: An E&F Miler Industries family roller coaster named The Sea Serpent, a Great Coasters International wooden roller coaster named White Lightning, and a Vekoma Suspended Family Coaster named Freedom Flyer.

Roller coasters
| Name | Manufacturer | Model name | Opened | Notes |
|---|---|---|---|---|
| Freedom Flyer | Vekoma | 395m Suspended Family Coaster | 2013 | |
| Sea Serpent | E&F Miler Industries | Family Coasters / Oval | 2013 | Purchased from Playland's Castaway Cove |
| White Lightning | Great Coasters International | Custom Out and back wooden roller coaster | 2013 | Only wooden roller coaster in Orlando, Florida |

Go-kart tracks
| Name | Description | Color | Opened | Notes |
|---|---|---|---|---|
| Conquest | Multi-level double corkscrew Florida Ski Jump figure 8 track | Blue | 1998 | |
| Commander | Road Course Style multi-level track | Green | 1998 | Extensively reconfigured in 2013 |
| Quad Helix | Multi-level quad corkscrew track | Yellow | 1998 | |
| Thrasher | Single rider, flat ‘road course’ sprint track | Red | 1998 | |

Thrill rides
| Name | Manufacturer | Model name | Opened | Notes |
|---|---|---|---|---|
| Rip Curl | Wisdom Rides, Inc. | Himalaya (ride) | 2013 | Brand new with a taller than normal ride base |
| Skycoaster | F3 Amusements, Inc. | Skycoaster | 2013 | Purchased from MGM Grand Adventures Theme Park |
| Hot Seat | S&S - Sansei Technologies | Screamin' Swing | | |
| Headrush 360 | SBF Visa Group | Midi Dance Party 360 | 2016 | |
| Liberty swing | ARM Rides | Sky Hawk | 2021 | The first of its kind, opening in May 2021. |

Former rides
| Name | Manufacturer | Model name | Opened | Closed | Notes |
|---|---|---|---|---|---|
| Air Race | Zamperla | Air Race | 2014 | | |
| Enterprise | Schwarzkopf | Enterprise | 2013 | 2024 | Purchased from Six Flags Over Georgia where it was called Wheelie |

=== Kissimmee location ===
Fun Spot America in Kissimmee, Florida, is located adjacent to the Old Town entertainment and shopping complex. The park is designed as a circular walkway around the lagoon featuring the world's tallest skycoaster, the entrance of which is on the west side of the lagoon. The south end of loop features the signature multi-level go-kart tracks, the east side the flat slick tracks. In the north east side of the loop is the Arcade and Kiddie Area and the Rockstar Coaster is at the north end of the loop.

In 2004, Fun Spot purchased the site of the world's tallest Skycoaster located in Kissimmee, adjacent to the Old Town entertainment and shopping complex. The site was purchased from Bill Kitchen, the inventor of the Skycoaster and owner of Skyventure. The site also included a recently opened G-Force dragster ride. Fun Spot developed the 9 acres around the skycoaster into another amusement park call Fun Spot USA in 2007 (now Fun Spot America - Kissimmee). They added 2 multi-level go-kart tracks, family/thrill rides and an arcade. Summer of 2011 saw the arrival of Fun Spot's first major roller coaster, the Power Trip Coaster at the Kissimmee park (now Rockstar Coaster). The Wild Mouse roller coaster, manufactured by Zamperla, was relocated from Cypress Gardens, where it was known as Galaxy Spin, when Cypress Gardens closed and became Legoland Florida.

Roller coasters
| Name | Manufacturer | Model name | Opened | Notes |
|---|---|---|---|---|
| Sea Serpent | E&F Miler Industries | Family Coasters / 11.5 ft Single Helix Center - CCW | 2012 | Purchased from Enchanted Forest Amusement Park in Illinois, where it was known as Boa Squeeze |
| Galaxy Spin | Zamperla | Wild Mouse roller coaster | 2011 | Purchased from Legoland Florida, where it was known as Galaxy Spin when Legoland was Cypress Gardens |
| Mine Blower | The Gravity Group | Wooden roller coaster | 2017 | This roller coaster is 82 feet tall, reaching 48.5 mph and features a 360-degree barrel roll inversion. It is the first inverting wooden roller coaster in Southeast America. It is also only one of 3 wooden coasters in operation in the state of Florida, with the other two being Coastersaurus at Legoland Florida, and White Lightning at Fun Spot Orlando. |
| Hurricane | E&F Miler Industries | Steel roller coaster | 2019 | Hurricane is 52 feet (16 m) tall and 1,300 feet (400 m) long. It was formerly known as Jack Rabbit at Celebration City (2003–2008) and Viking Voyage at Wild Adventures (2010–2018). |

Go-kart tracks
| Name | Description | Color | Opened | Notes |
|---|---|---|---|---|
| Vortex | 4 stories (40-ft high) Helix track with 32 degree banks | Yellow | 2007 | |
| Chaos | Multi-level track | Blue | 2007 | |
| Road Course | Hairpin Turn Track | Green | | Removed in 2016 and replaced with MineBlower |
| Slick Track | Fastest slickest track | Red | | Removed in 2016 and replaced with MineBlower |

Thrill rides
| Name | Manufacturer | Model name | Opened | Notes |
|---|---|---|---|---|
| Skycoaster | F3 Amusements, Inc. | Skycoaster | 1997 | World's tallest |
| Headrush 360 | SBF Visa Group | | 2016 | |
| Hot Seat | S&S – Sansei Technologies | Screamin' Swing | | <2011 |
| Flying Bobs | Chance Rides | Matterhorn | | |
| Yo-Yo | Chance Rides | | | |

== Former parks ==
- Myrtle Beach, South Carolina (opened in 1990, closed in 1998)
- Virginia Beach, Virginia (opened in 1992, closed in 1998)
- Fayetteville, Georgia (opened in 1990 as Dixieland Fun Park, acquired in 2017, closed in 2026)

== Awards ==
Fun Spot was awarded the 2012 Brass Ring for "Top Family Entertainment Center (FEC) - North America" by the International Association of Amusement Parks and Attractions (IAAPA).
