= University of Applied Sciences, Kaiserslautern =

German university

Coordinates: 49°27′06″N 7°45′50″E

Kaiserslautern University of Applied Sciences
- Hochschule Kaiserslautern
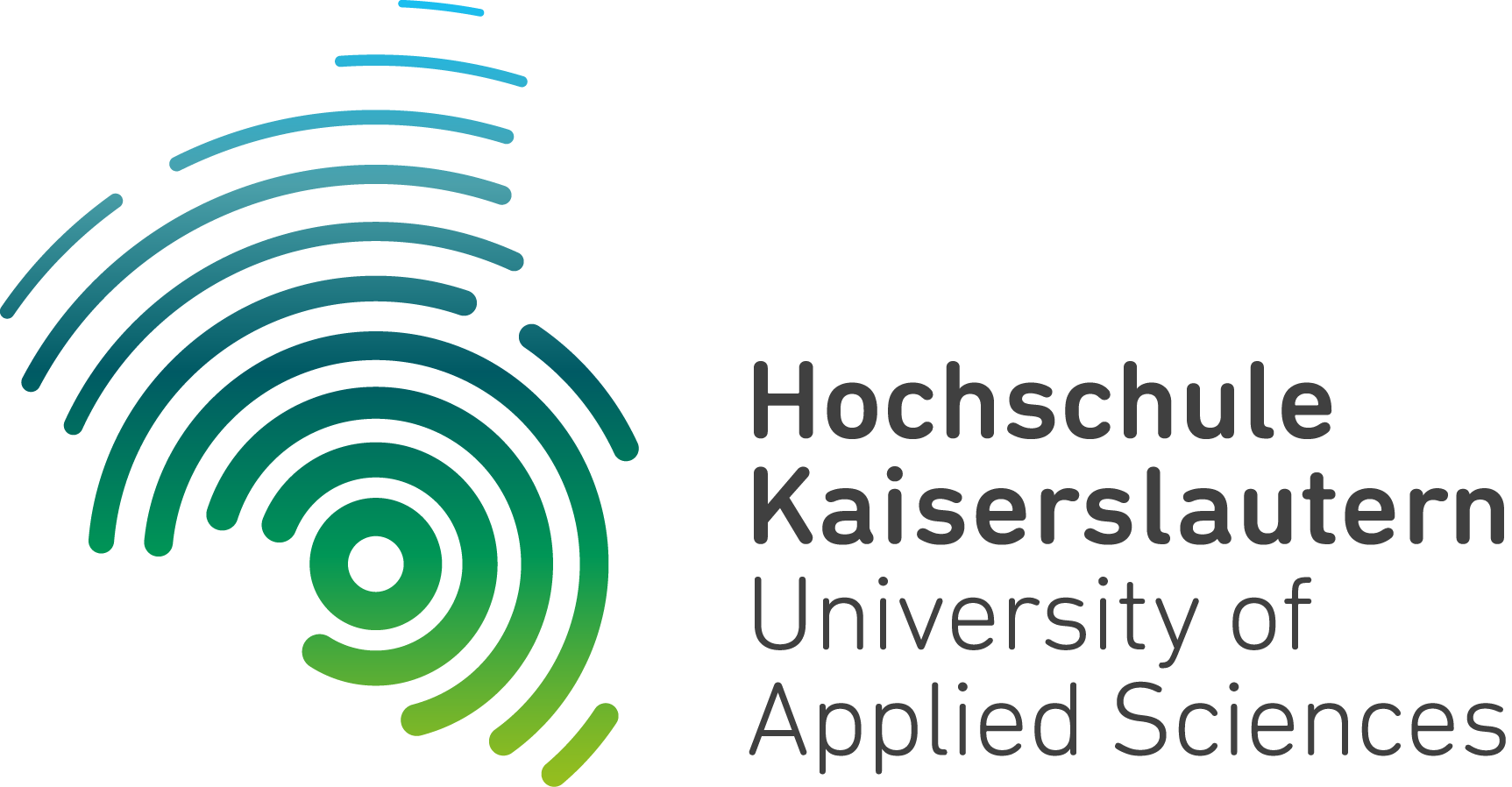
- Type: Public University of Applied Sciences
- Established: 1996
- President: Hans-Joachim Schmidt
- Location: Kaiserslautern, Pirmasens, and Zweibrücken, Rhineland-Palatinate, Germany
- Website: www.hs-kl.de/en/university/

The Kaiserslautern University of Applied Sciences (German: Hochschule Kaiserslautern, HS Kaiserslautern) is a Hochschule (University of Applied Sciences) with three campuses in Germany: in Kaiserslautern, Pirmasens, and Zweibrücken.

== History ==
The Hochschule Kaiserslautern, also known as the University of Applied Sciences Kaiserslautern or HS Kaiserslautern, was founded in its present form in 1996 as a new university formed out of a department of the Rhineland-Palatinate University of Applied Sciences, which was founded in 1971.

In June 2023, the university was hit by a cyber attack, causing its whole IT system to be out of action.

In July 2026, architectural students from the university designed a timber pavilion for the Gabonsa Festival in Innsbruck, Austria, which was widely reported.

== Description and organisation ==
With about 6400 students (as of 2019/20), it is one of the largest Universities of Applied Sciences in the state of Rhineland-Palatinate. It offers around 50 higher education degrees such as bachelor's degrees and master's degrees.

As of August 2026 the president of the university is Hans-Joachim Schmidt

=== Departments ===
- Applied Logistics and Polymer Sciences
- Building and Design
- Business Administration
- Engineering
- Computer Sciences / Microsystems Technology

== Locations ==
=== Kaiserslautern ===
The headquarters of the university are on the campus at Kaiserslautern, which also contains the department of Building and Design and Engineering. The campus has been split into two sites, one on Morlauter Street and the other on Schoenstraße, but it is planned that they will be combined on the old site of the Kammgarnspinnerei.

=== Pirmasens ===
The Campus of Pirmasens campus is the smallest, and comprises the departments of Applied Logistics and Polymer Sciences.

=== Zweibrücken ===
The Zweibrücken campus was founded in 1994 on an old US military base, and contains the departments of Business Administration and Computer Sciences/Microsystem Technology.

== International focus ==
The university engages in student and professor exchanges with over 150 universities around the world. The proportion of foreign students is around 14 per cent.

== See also ==
- Hochschule
- Fachhochschule
