= Wodan Timbur Coaster =

Wooden roller coaster at Europa-Park

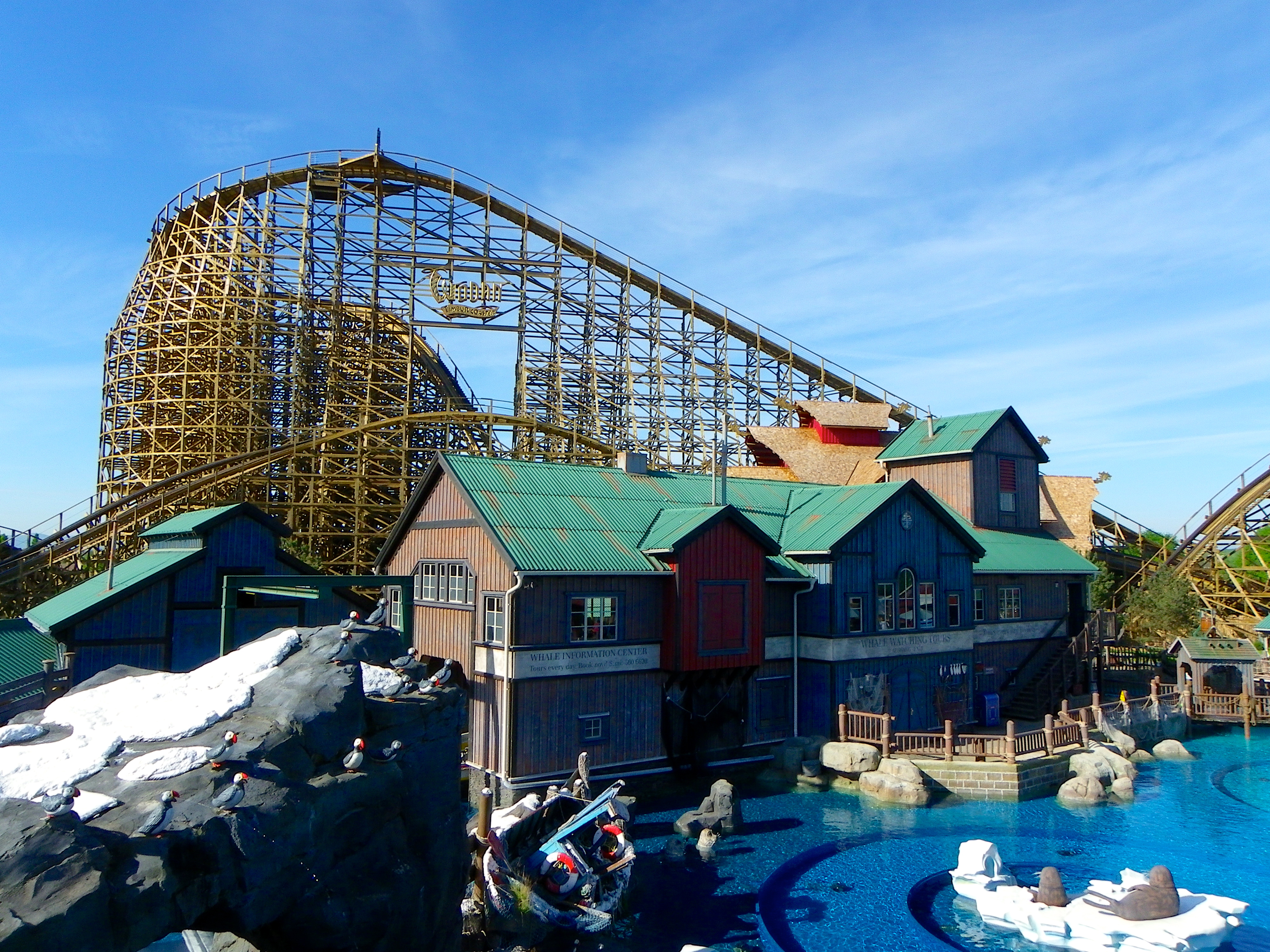
- Wodan's logo(top), view of Wodan from another location in the park(bottom)

Europa-Park
- Location: Europa-Park
- Park section: Iceland
- Coordinates: 48°15′41″N 7°43′09″E
- Status: Operating
- Opening date: 31 March 2012
- Cost: ca. 10 Mio€

General statistics
- Type: Wood
- Manufacturer: Great Coasters International
- Lift/launch system: Chain lift hill
- Height: 131 ft (40 m)
- Length: 3,444 ft (1,050 m)
- Speed: 62.1 mph (99.9 km/h)
- Inversions: 0
- Duration: 3:25
- Max vertical angle: 52°
- Capacity: 1250 riders per hour
- G-force: 3.5
- Height restriction: 120 cm (3 ft 11 in)
- Trains: 3 trains with 12 cars; riders arranged 2 across in a single row for a total of 24 riders per train
- Website: Official website
- Restraints: Lap bar
- Single rider line available
- Wodan Timbur Coaster at RCDB

Wodan Timbur Coaster is a wooden roller coaster, located in the Europa-Park in Rust, Baden-Württemberg. The coaster opened on March 31, 2012.

== Ride ==
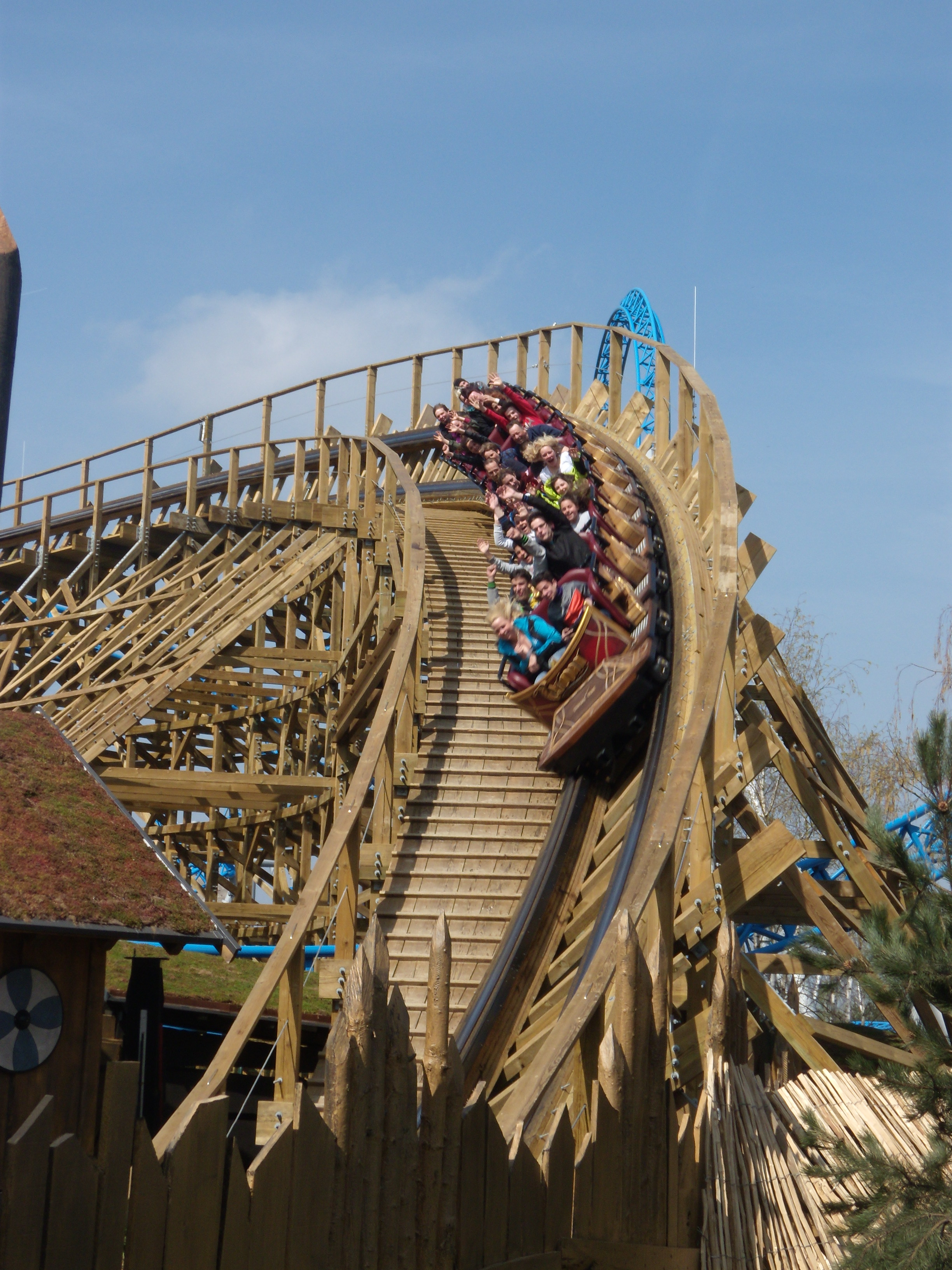
Wodan Timbur Coaster in action

Wodan Timbur Coaster is located in the Iceland section of the park that opened in 2009. The coaster intertwines with two attractions: Atlantica SuperSplash and Blue Fire. The coaster is the park's first wooden coaster and was built by Great Coasters International. Wodan Timbur Coaster is equipped with three GCI Millennium Flyer trains that feature polyurethane wheels instead of steel wheels.

== Theme ==
Wodan Timbur Coaster is based on Norse mythology. The queue features several heavily detailed elements, including fire, mist and water effects. The goddess of death, Hel, is also featured and has a turning sand timer. Projection mapping, smoke screens and moving ceilings are used in the indoor sections, which immerse guests in mythology. In the ride station, statues watch the train leave and turn to watch the train arrive. Two wooden wolves are placed at the top of the lifhill. The ride also has several dives into tunnels and heavy interaction with surrounding areas.

== Rankings ==
Golden Ticket Awards: Top wood Roller Coasters
Year									1998	1999
Ranking									–	–
Year	2000	2001	2002	2003	2004	2005	2006	2007	2008	2009
Ranking	–	–	–	–	–	–	–	–	–	–
Year	2010	2011	2012	2013	2014	2015	2016	2017	2018	2019
Ranking	–	–	–	31	21	29	23	15	16	23
Year	2020	2021	2022	2023	2024	2025	2026			
Ranking	N/A	23	13	14	9	10	11			

Mitch Hawker's Best Roller Coaster Poll: Best wood-Tracked Roller Coaster
Year	2012	2013
Ranking	22	18

== See also ==
- 2012 in amusement parks
