= Europa-Park =

Amusement park in Germany

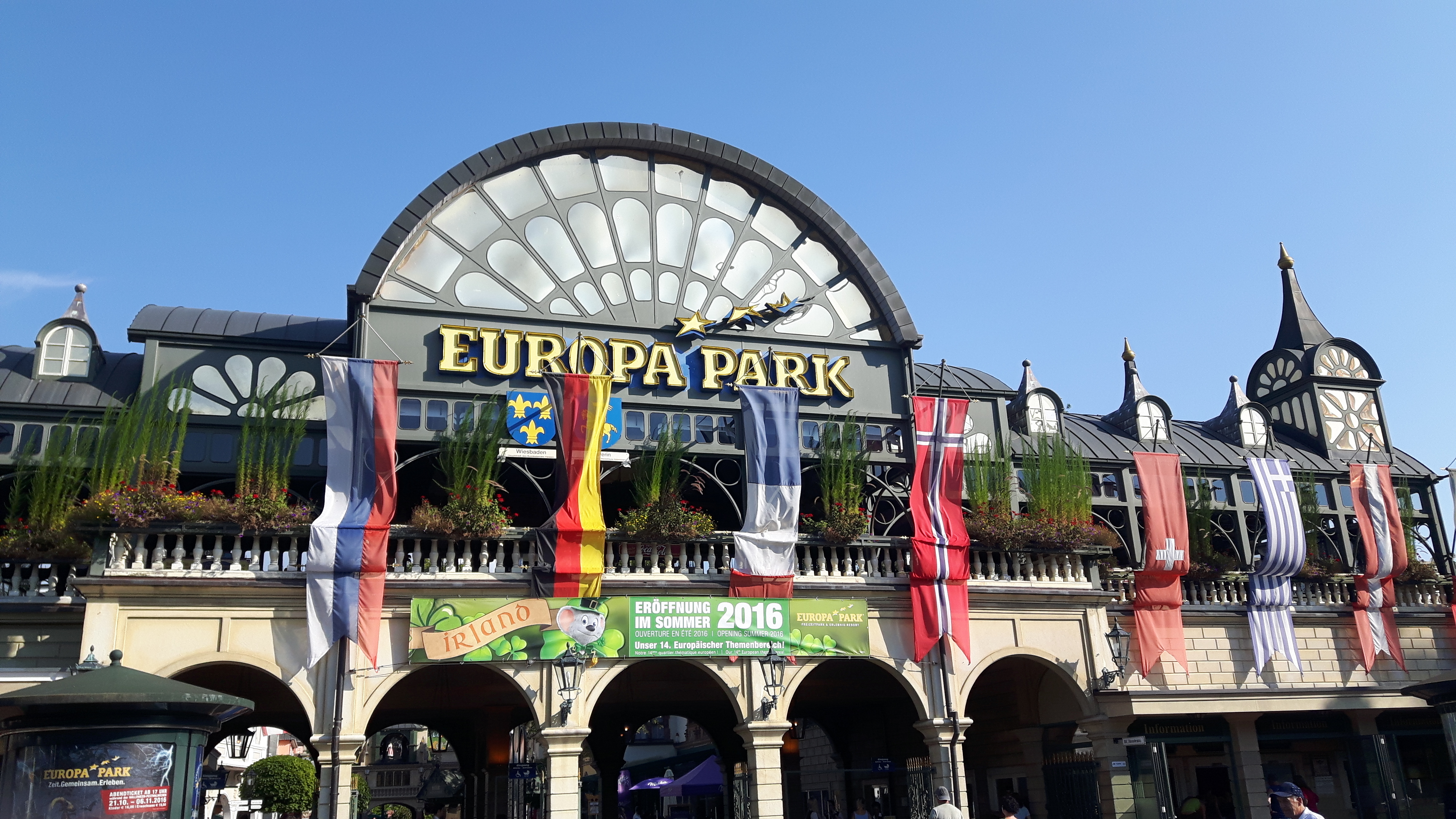
- Europa-Park's main entrance in 2016
- Interactive map of Europa-Park
- Location: Europa-Park-Straße 2; 77977 Rust, Baden-Württemberg, Germany
- Coordinates: 48°16′06″N 7°43′15″E
- Status: Operating
- Opened: 12 July 1975; 51 years ago
- Owner: Mack family
- Operating season: April to early January
- Attendance: 5,4 million (6 million with Rulantica) (2022)
- Area: 950,000 m^{2} (10,225,715 sq ft) (parks, hotels, parking lots, backstage)

Attractions
- Total: 100
- Roller coasters: 14
- Water rides: 12
- Website: www.europapark.de

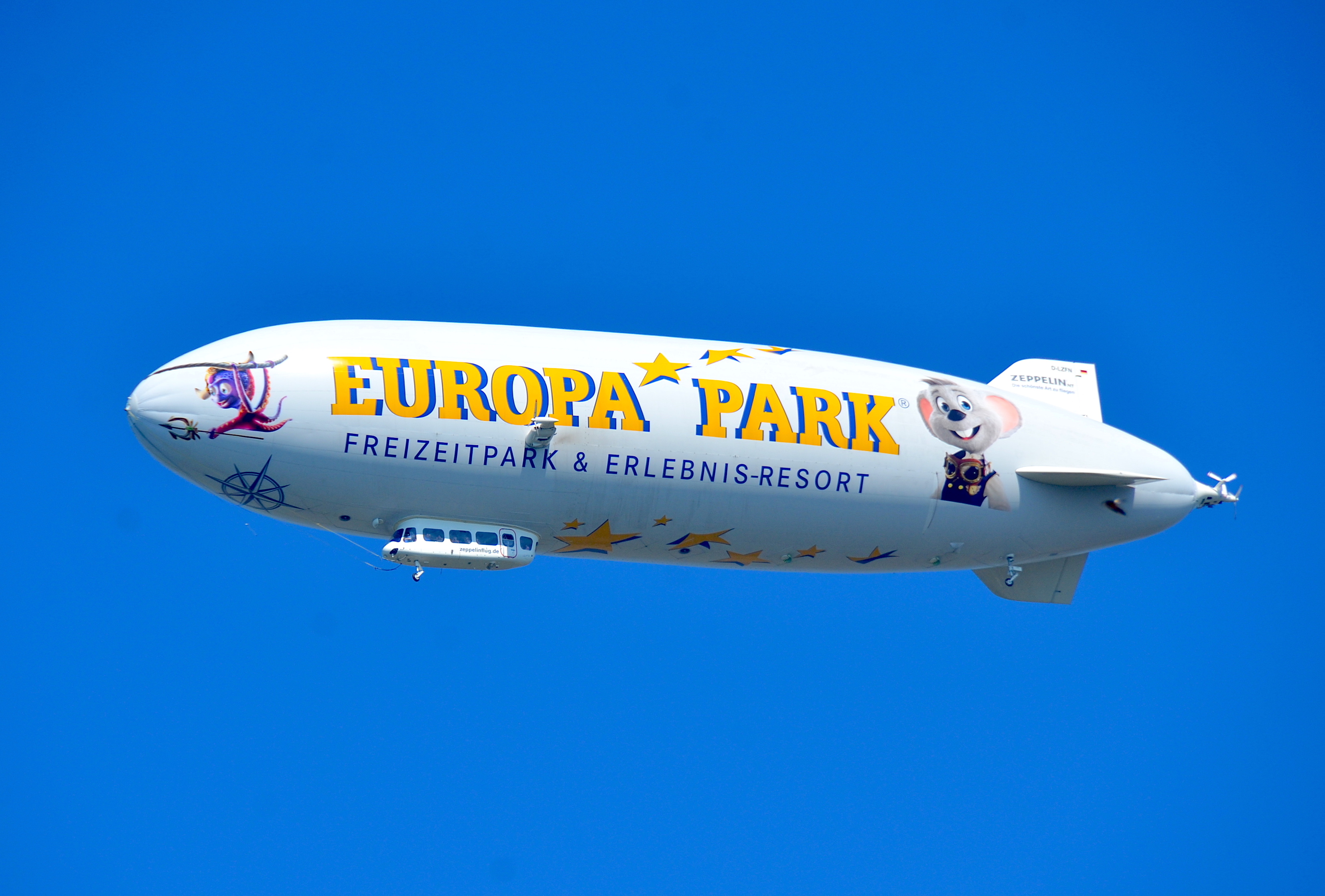
A Zeppelin NT (D-LZFN) of Friedrichshafen used for advertisement

Europa-Park is a theme park and resort in Rust, Baden-Württemberg, Germany. Covering a total area of 95 hectares (235 acres), the park features twenty themed areas and around a hundred attractions, including shows and fourteen roller coasters. The resort also includes six hotels, a camping site, a tepee village, a cinema and a conference center.

According to the AECOM Theme Index 2020, Europa-Park is ranked 19th out of the 25 most visited theme parks in the world and is the third most visited theme park in Europe after Disneyland Paris and Efteling, as well as the most visited seasonal theme park in the world.

The park received 5.4 million visitors in 2022. Alongside Rulantica, the resort had over six million visitors. Also that year, the Golden Ticket Award jury of the US magazine Amusement Today voted Europa-Park the "best theme park in the world" for the eighth year in a row.

== History ==
=== Background and founding ===
In 1958, Franz Mack (1921–2010) took over the family firm, Mack GmbH & Co. KG (now Mack Rides), together with his brothers. Along with his son Roland Mack (born 1949), he visited the US in 1972 and was inspired to open a theme park in Germany as an exhibition site for his company's built amusement rides, including flat rides, dark rides, log flumes, tow boat rides and roller coasters. At first, the park was planned to be located in Breisach. It was named "Europa-Park" after Breisach's nearby Europaweiher, a small artificial lake which commemorates a historical pilot poll held in Breisach in 1950, in which 95.6% of voters were in favor of European unification. The Breisach site was deemed unsuitable because of flooding hazard, and the project moved some 30 kilometres (19 mi) further north, where the Macks bought the park of the Balthasar castle in Rust. An adjacent fairy-tale park was acquired as an additional site.

The park opened on 12 July 1975 with an area of 16 hectares. Initially, the park was managed by Franz Mack. Later his sons Roland and Jürgen Mack joined the management. It counted 250,000 visitors in the first year; 700,000 in the second; and passed the million mark in 1978.

=== Themed areas and growth (1980s–2012) ===
Overview of parts of the park in 2026

In 1982, the first country-themed section opened featuring Italy. Like most of the original themed areas at Europa-Park, it was designed by Ulrich Damrau. Later, the Alpenexpress "Enzian" and Schweizer Bobbahn rides opened in 1984 and 1985, respectively. The European theme was pursued further with the opening of the sections Holland (1984), England (1988), France (1990), Scandinavia (1992), Spain (1994) and the German Alley (1996). In 1991, for the first time the park counted over 2 million visitors. With El Andaluz in 1995, the first hotel in a German theme park was opened. An increase in the length of stay resulting from growing number of attractions in the park led to an increase in the demand for overnight accommodation. In its first year, the hotel was booked to 87% of its capacity. In 1999, it was followed by the construction of the hotel Castillo Alcazar. By 2001, the number of visitors had risen to 3.1 million. The same year, Europa-Park was the first theme park in Germany operating in winter as well, with 180,000 visitors in that season. In order to strengthen its own brand and initiate the park's business activities in digital formats, Michael Mack founded MackMedia in 2002. The company shoots image and advertising films, produces music videos, games and special films. After a continuous increase of visitors the following years, in 2011, the park counted 4.5 million visitors, and by 2012 the park encompassed an area of 90 hectares (220 acres), featuring eleven roller-coasters, five themed hotels with a turnover of close to EUR 300 million and more than 3,000 employees.

=== Further expansion and fire incident (2012–2018) ===
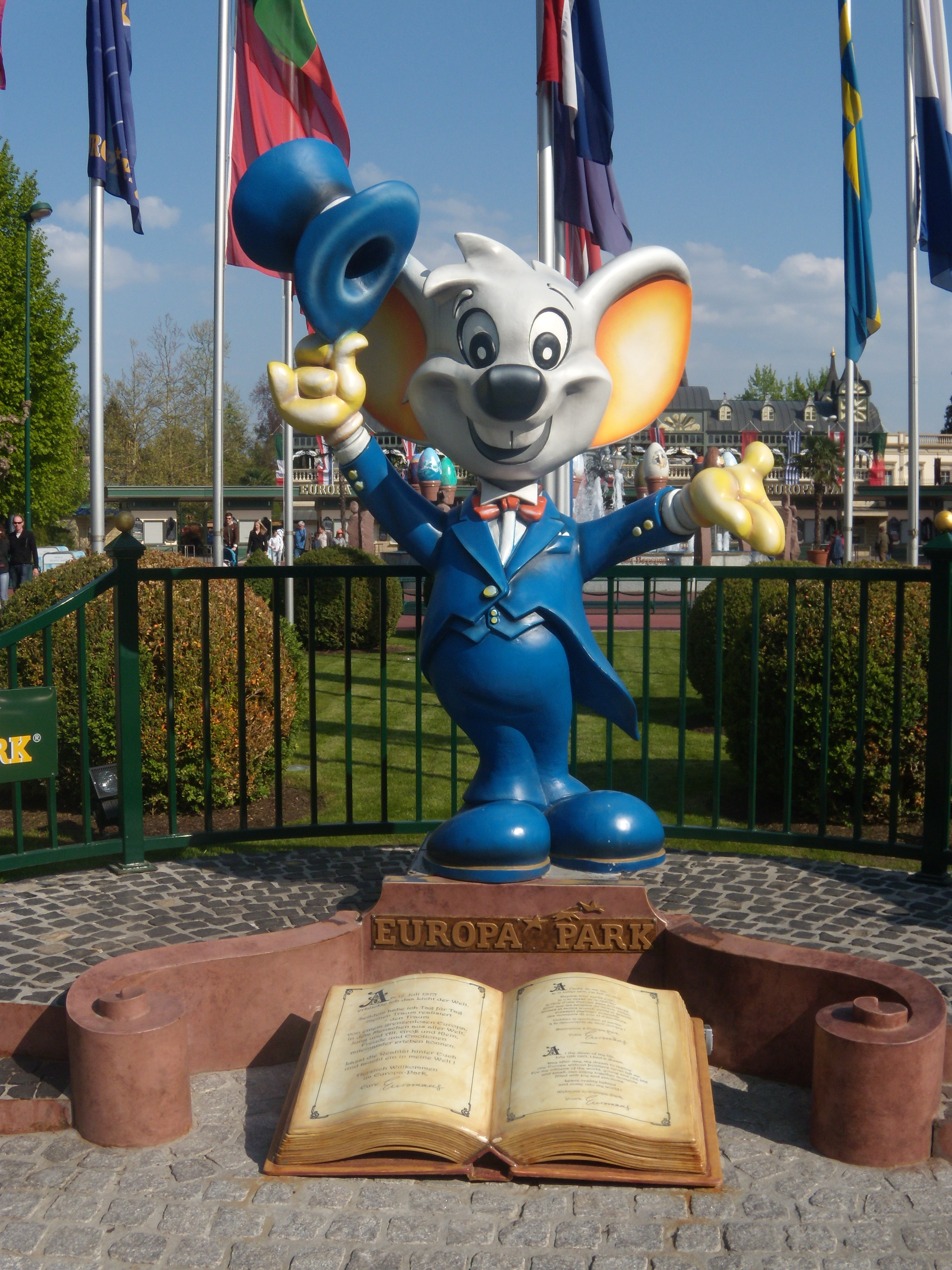
Ed Euromaus, the park mascot developed by MackMedia (pictured in 2011)

In 2012, the water park project Rulantica was initiated. Two years later, the Rulantica brand was registered by Europa-Park GmbH & Co Mack KG. In 2017, Europa-Park opened the attraction Voletarium, the biggest flight motion simulator theater in Europe. The flying theater features a queue line with multiple pre-show elements culminating in the main ride section: a film showcasing European landmarks which lasts for 4 minutes and 30 seconds.

On 26 May 2018, a fire broke out in a building complex near to the park's Holland and Scandinavia areas. Despite the efforts of the fire department, the building was destroyed, along with parts of the neighboring Scandinavia section. According to the operators, the incident resulted in tens of millions of Euros in property damage. No visitors or employees were injured, but seven firefighters suffered minor injuries during firefighting operations. With the exception of a few hot spots, the fire was mostly extinguished and the park reopened the very next morning. Only the destroyed Pirates in Batavia ride, a restaurant, a theatre, a few shops, the fjørd ride, as well as the neighboring attraction Koffiekopjes, remained closed for refurbishment. On 6 June 2018, the Offenburg police stated that the fire broke out due to a technical failure in the fjørd water ride. The Scandinavian village area and Pirates Batavia ride were both rebuilt based on their original designs with certain additions and modernizations, and reopened in July 2020.

Further, in 2019 the new dark ride Snorri Tours was established in this area, which has taken the water world of Rulantica and its mascot Snorri as its theme. Snorri Tours was the prototype of a media dark ride by Tacumeon Rides, a newly founded sister company of Mack Rides that specializes in marketing media-based attractions.

=== Opening of Rulantica and COVID-19 pandemic (2019–2021) ===
After several years of construction, Europa-Park's water park Rulantica was completed in October 2019, and was opened on 28 November 2019. Until then, the total cost was estimated at EUR 180 million. After initial speculations, the park is located near the Europa-Park, but operates separately from the latter. Rulantica contains the actual water park with more than 30 slides and attractions, the Krønasår hotel, the Hyggedal sauna and relax area, as well as car parks. The park includes 13 themed areas with a total square footage of 4 hectares (9.9 acres) of which more than 3.26 hectares (8.1 acres) are indoors.

In 2019, before the COVID-19-pandemic, the Europa-Park had over 5.7 million people visiting. Due to the pandemic the park had to shut down operations temporarily. As a result, the park registered significant declines in visitors in 2020 and 2021. On average, in 2020 and 2021, around 2.75 million visitors were counted. In addition, the pandemic strained the staff situation. As a result, the park had to cap the number of daily visitors temporarily in 2022.

=== Recent development (2022 onwards) ===
In 2017, Europa-Park acknowledged allegations of racial and cultural insensitivities; some attractions in the Adventure Land featured potentially offensive portrayals of African people as "tribal" (with white characters featured as colonial rulers and safari hunters). However, no major changes were made to the attraction until 2021, only minor changes such as changing the name of the Colonial Food Station to Adventure Food Station. The reason given for the delay was the Covid pandemic. In January 2022, it was announced that the Jungle Rafts ride would be closed until the start of the 2023 season, to be completely renovated and rethemed as a new part of the Austria area. In March 2022, the Jungle Rafts ride reopened under the new name Josefina’s Magical Imperial Journey (now themed to the adjacent Austrian-themed area), with all references to colonial Africa removed. The final reconstruction will take place in several phases in the next years.

In 2022, the resort, including Rulantica, surpassed the threshold of 6 million visitors for the first time. In November of the same year, the new restaurant experience Eatrenalin opened. Further, construction work began on the new Croatia themed area. Its main attraction, Voltron Nevera, was announced be a further development of the Big Dipper ride model from Mack Rides, dubbed a "Stryker Coaster" - a roller coaster that allows direction changes in a tight radius - set to be arranged around a replica of the Wardenclyffe Tower. Initially scheduled to open in 2023, it was postponed to 2024 due to supply difficulties.

On 19 June 2023, a fire broke out in a control room. It was believed to be caused by corroded wiring. The fire caused the park to be evacuated and drew 450 firefighters and emergency personnel to the scene. The blaze was brought under control with only two firefighters lightly injured, and the park reopened the next day.

On 26 April 2024, Voltron Nevera powered by Rimac opened to the public. This roller coaster, inspired by the Croatian electric super car Rimac Nevera, is located in the Croatian area, which is the 17th themed zone of the park.

== Operator ==
Europa-Park is operated by Europa-Park GmbH & Co Mack KG. The Mack family has been producing roller coasters and attractions for eight generations since 1880. The managing directors of the park are Roland Mack, his brother Jürgen Mack and Roland Mack's sons Thomas Mack and Michael Mack. In the fiscal year 2020/2021, the operating company generated revenues of €149,665,000 and employed around 4,500 people (2022).

Further, with the subsidiary Mack Media & Brands GmbH & Co KG Europa-Park ventures beyond the theme park business and produces films, video games and operates a music label.

== Attendance ==
Number of visitors to Europa-Park from 2009 to 2023 (in millions)
2009	2010	2011	2012	2013	2014	2015	2016	2017	2018	2019	2020	2021	2022	2023
4.25	4.25	4.5	4.6	4.9	5.	5.5	5.6	5.7	5.72	5.75	2.5	3	5.4	6

== Infrastructure ==
The park is divided into 21 thematic areas, 18 of which are European countries/regions and are designed to be authentically featuring the respective region (2026). They are intended to give visitors the feeling of being able to discover several European countries within one day. The first themed area was Italy in 1982. The Swiss mountain village of Grimentz served as the structural model for area Switzerland. From 1990 until 2010 the Lilac Chocoland was a themed area with no direct connection to the country, but to Milka instead. Its attractions were first added to the English area, then used to create Luxembourg. The 3 remaining themed areas with no connection to a country are Adventure Land, Grimm's Fairytale Forest and Kingdom of the Minimoys.

Areas representing european countries / regions
Area	Opened	Comment
Italy	1982	
Netherlands	1984, 2020	The village opened in 1984 as Holländisches Dorf ("Dutch village") and was expanded later. In 2018 a fire destroyed parts of the area and it was subsequently rebuilt.
England	1988	Created by retheming attractions in the former center of the park. Initially called Victoria Square.
France	1990	Initially named Quartier Français.
Scandinavia	1992, 2019	Fjord Rafts were opened in 1991 and the village in 1992. The 2018 fire destroyed the village completely (except for the stave church) and it was subsequently rebuilt.
Austria	1992	Created by retheming rides previously belonging to Adventure Land. Expanded later.
Switzerland	1993	Schweizer Bobbahn opened in 1985 without the village, which opened in 1993.
Spain	1994	
Germany	1996	The German Allee opened in 1996 and was later merged with the Castle's Garden area (older attractions close to the Balthasar Castle) into a single german section.
Russia	1998	
Greece	2000	Expanded in 2007 by retheming the (formerly Swiss) Ice Stadium.
Portugal	2005	
Iceland	2009	
Luxembourg	2016	Created by retheming the area previously named Lilac Chocolate Land.
Ireland	2016	Created by retheming the World of Children.
Liechtenstein	2023	Created by moving the Balloon Ride and retheming it.
Croatia	2024	
Monaco	2026	Created by retheming the station building and plaza in front of Silver Star (previously French).

Areas not representing specific countries
Area	Opened	Comment
Adventure Land	1990	Created by grouping all attractions around the park's lake into one area on the map in 1990. The area was made smaller through the years by retheming most of the attractions to become Austrian or to belong to the Grimm's Fairytale Forest. It currently only consists of a self-service restaurant, a snack shop and a water playground on the west side of the lake.
Grimm's Fairytale Forest	2011	Redesign and reconstruction of the 1975 Fairytale Avenue. Consists of attractions based on the German Grimm brothers fairytales.
The Minimoys Kingdom	2014	Themed after Arthur and the Minimoys, by French director Luc Besson.

== Attractions ==
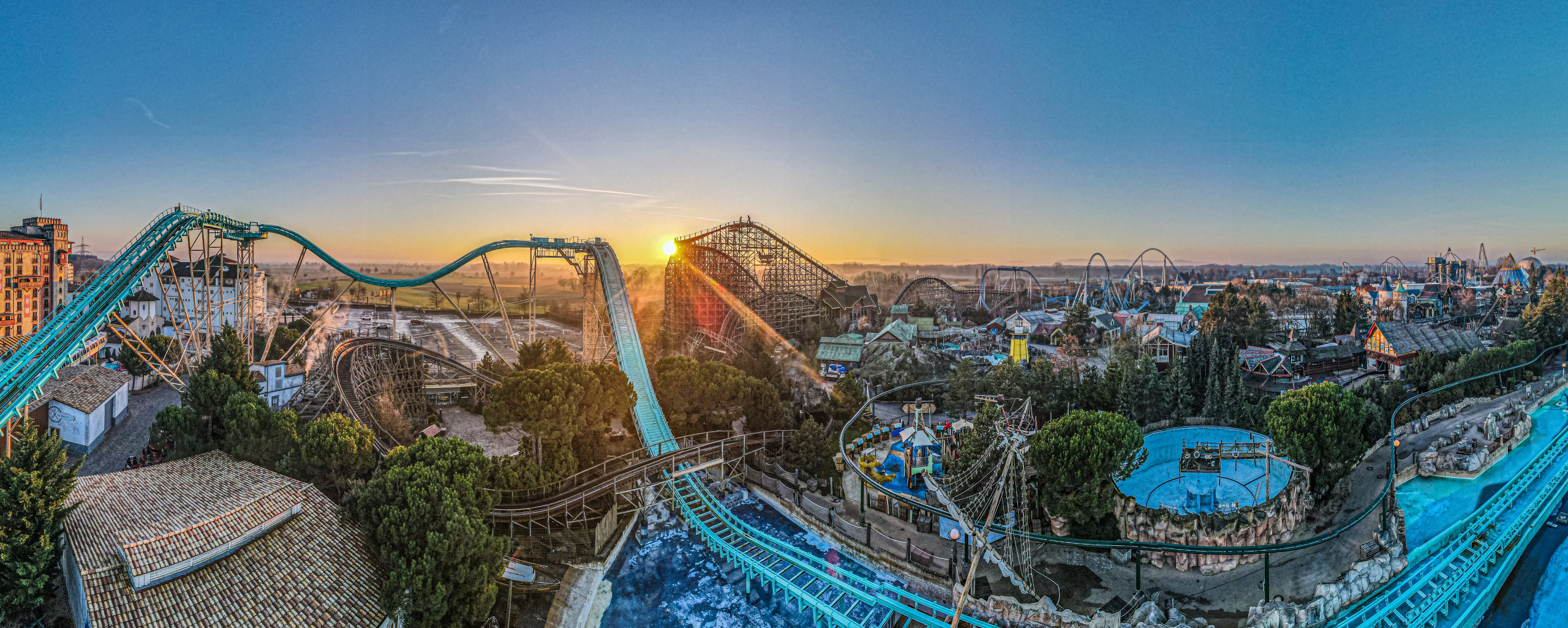
Panorama of Europa-Park, 2023

The theme park offers a mixture of rides, themed areas and parks. One of the main attractions is the hypercoaster Silver Star, which was planned by the Swiss engineering office Bolliger & Mabillard and constructed in cooperation with Mercedes-Benz.

The roller coaster Euro-Mir has rotatable gondolas, so the ride is temporarily backwards. The ride in Eurosat CanCan Coaster takes place in a big sphere which is designed with special effects that create the illusion of a night flight over Paris; it was inspired by the style of Moulin Rouge. Euro-Mir and Eurosat are among the few roller coasters in the world that have a drum lift to move the coaster cars upwards. The ascent in a drum lift runs on spirally laid rails, in the middle of which there is a rotating body. At the bottom of the ride, the rotating body connects itself with a gripper arm to the coaster car, transports it upwards, and disconnects again.

The Blue Fire Megacoaster is the first launched roller coaster in the Europa-Park, including a linear motor start and rollover elements, namely one looping, two corkscrews and one heartline roll. This roller coaster accelerates from 0 to 100 km/h (62 mph) in 2.5 seconds, reaches a maximum velocity of 110 km/h (68 mph), is 38 metres (125 ft) high and 1,056 metres (3,465 ft) long. In 2012, the first wooden rollercoaster Wodan - Timburcoaster opened. A special feature of this roller coaster is that it crosses paths with the Blue Fire Megacoaster and the Atlantic Supersplash water coaster.

=== Roller coasters ===
Name	Image	Year opened	Manufacturer	Location	Description/Type	Height	Length	max. Speed	max. G-Force	Capacity (in pers/h)	Ride Duration (in min.)	min. Age	min. Size
Alpenexpress Enzian (formerly Grottenblitz)		1984/2024	Mack Rides	Austria	Mine train, powered coaster	6 m	264 m	45 km/h (28 mph)	2	1100	1:40	4	100 cm
Schweizer Bobbahn		1985	Mack Rides	Switzerland	Bobsled coaster	19 m	487 m	50 km/h (31 mph)	3	1100	1:45	6	120 cm
Eurosat - CanCan Coaster (formerly Eurosat)		1989 / 2018	Mack Rides	France	Indoor coaster	25,5 m	922 m	60 km/h (37 mph)	4	1600	3:18	6	120 cm
Euro-Mir		1997	Mack Rides	Russia	Spinning coaster	28 m	980 m	80 km/h (50 mph)	4	1600	4:33	8	130 cm
Matterhorn Blitz		1999	Mack Rides	Switzerland	Wild mouse	16 m	383 m	56 km/h (35 mph)	2	960	3:05	6	120 cm
Water roller coaster Poseidon		2000	Mack Rides	Greece	Water coaster	23 m	836 m	70 km/h (43 mph)	3	1690	4:00	6	120 cm
Silver Star		2002	Bolliger & Mabillard	France	Hypercoaster	73 m	1620 m	127 km/h (79 mph)	4	1750	5:50	11	140 cm
Atlantica SuperSplash		2005	Mack Rides	Portugal	Water coaster	30 m	390 m	80 km/h (50 mph)	4	1400	3:35	4	100 cm
Pegasus - The YoungStar Coaster		2006	Mack Rides	Greece	Family coaster	13 m	400 m	65 km/h (40 mph)	3	1000	2:11	4	100 cm
Blue Fire Megacoaster		2009	Mack Rides	Iceland	Launched coaster	38 m	1056 m	100 km/h (62 mph)	3,8	1720	2:30	7	130 cm
Wodan Timbur Coaster		2012	Great Coasters International	Iceland	Wooden coaster	40 m	1050 m	100 km/h (62 mph)	3,5	1250	3:25	6	120 cm
ARTHUR		2014	Mack Rides	ARTHUR - In the Minimoys Kingdom	Inverted, spinning, powered coaster	13,5 m	505 m	31 km/h (19 mph)	1,5	1400	4:30	4	100 cm
Ba-a-a Express		2016	ART Engineering	Ireland – Children's World	Kiddie coaster	3 m	67 m	20 km/h (12 mph)	1,5	400	1:30	3	95 cm
Voltron Nevera		2024	Mack Rides	Croatia	Stryker coaster	32.5 m	1385 m	90 km/h (56 mph)	4	1600	3:00	8	130 cm

=== Other attractions ===
The range of rides is supplemented by several water rides, carousels, and themed rides. The latter are rides with a boat in a water channel or a wagon on a track, which transport the visitors into strange worlds and sceneries with the help of computer-controlled animated puppets (so-called animatronics) or media based content. In detail, the park offers:

Name	Type	Max. Height	Manufacturer	Location	Year opened
Atlantis Adventure	interactive dark ride	–	Mack Rides	Greece	2007
Danube Steamer	boat tour	–	Mack Rides	Austria	1975 (reconstruction in 2007 and 2022, before: "Mississippi Steamer" and "African Queen")
Arena of Football	dodgems ride	–	Mack Rides (flooring), Bertazzon (vehicles)	England	2006
Crazy Taxi	demolition derby carousel ride	–	Zamperla	England	2008
Casa da Aventura	indoor-playground	–	–	Portugal	2003
Dancing Dingie	spinning boat	–	Zierer	Ireland – Children's World	2016
Josefina's Magical Imperial Ride	tow boat/dark ride	–	Mack Rides	Austria	1978 (reconstruction in 2022, before: "Finnish Raft Ride" and "Djungle Raft Ride")
Ed and Edda's Grand Prix EDventure	Mack Rides Interactive Gameplay Theater	–	Mack Rides	Germany	2025
Elf Ride	boat ride	–	Mack Rides	Germany	1979 (before: "Channel Flower Ride")
EP-Express	monorail	6 m	AEG/Von Roll	Germany, Greece, Spain	1995
Euro-Tower	observation tower	75 m	Intamin	France	1983 (reconstruction in 2015)
Feria Swing	Music Express	3 m	Mack Rides	Spain	1994
Fjord-Rafting	River rapids ride	8 m	Intamin	Scandinavia	1991
Flying Dutchman	carousel ride	0,5 m	Mack Rides	Netherlands	1982
Cassandra's Curse	Madhouse	4 m	Mack Rides	Greece	2000
Castello dei Medici	Dark Ride	6 m	Mack Rides	Italy	1982 (reconstruction in 2024, before: "Ghost Castle" and "Catello Leone")
Jim Knopf	tracked ride	–	Mack Rides	Germany	1977 (reconstruction in 2018, before: "Old 99")
Jungfrau Glacier Flight	plane ride	14 m	Mack Rides	Swiss	1989
Koffiekopjes	spinning tea cup ride	–	Mack Rides	Netherlands	1985
Kolumbusjolle	Music Express	3 m	Mack Rides	Spain	1994 (reconstruction in 2015)
Lada Autodrom	car ride	–	Mack Rides	Russia	1987 (before: "Bugatti Race Track")
Limerick Castle	indoor-playground	–	–	Ireland – Children's World	2016
Lítill Island – Hansgrohe Water Playground	water playground	–	–	Iceland	2010
London Bus	Flying Bus	7 m	Zamperla	England	2008
Madame Freudenreich Curiosités	Dark Ride	5 m	Mack Rides	France	1994 (reconstruction in 2018, before: "Universe of Energy")
Puppet Boat Ride	boat ride	–	Mack Rides	Germany	1992
Mini Scooters	kiddie bumper car ride	–	Mack Rides (flooring), Ihle (vehicles)	Netherlands	1977
Monorail	monorail	6 m	Mack Rides	Iceland, Luxembourg	1990 (extended in 2009)
Mul-Muls Carousel	jump around	–	Zamperla	Minimoys Kingdom	2014
Old Mac Donald's Tractor Fun	tractor ride	–	Metallbau Emmeln	Ireland – Children's World	2016
Vintage Cars	car ride	–	Mack Rides (track), Ihle (vehicles)	Germany	1976
Panorama Train	Ridable miniature railway	–	Chance Morgan/Chance Rides (rebuilt by SEW Eurodrive)	Germany, England, Spain, Russia	1975
Paul's Playboat	playground	–	–	Ireland – Children's World	2016
Piccolo Mondo	Dark Ride	–	Mack Rides	Italy	1982 (reconstruction in 2011, before: "Ciao Bambini" and "Fairytale Ride")
Pirates of Batavia	Water Dark Ride	6 m	Mack Rides	Netherlands	1987 (reconstruction due to fire in 2018)
Poppy Towers	family free fall tower	–	Zierer	Minimoys Kingdom	2014
Quipse Paddle Boats	children's rowing boat ride	–	Klarer Freizeitanlagen	Ireland – Children's World	2001 (reconstruction in 2016, before: "Paddletour")
Red Baron	carousel ride	7 m	Mack Rides	Netherlands	1980
Snowflake Sleigh Ride	Dark Ride	4 m	Mack Rides	Russia	1998
Sheep Rock	water carousel	–	Mack Rides	Ireland – Children's World	1990 (reconstruction in 2016, before: "Wikinger Boat Ride")
Silverstone Race Track	go-kart ride	–	Mack Rides (track), Ihle (vehicles)	England	1975 (before: "Monza Race Track")
Snorri Touren	Dark Ride	–	Mack Rides	Scandinavia	2019
Spinning Dragons	carousel ride	–	Mack Rides	Ireland – Children's World	1993 (reconstruction in 2016, before: "Dino-Carousel")
The British Carousel	antique carousel	–	Mack Rides	England	1981 (before: "Antiquated Horse-Carousel")
Tirol Log Flume	log flume ride	18 m	Mack Rides	Austria	1978 (partial reconstruction after fire in 2023, reopened 2024)
Tower Tow	tower ride	9 m	Heege	Ireland – Children's World	2002 (reconstruction in 2016, before: "Light House Fun")
Vindjammer	Swing boat	20 m	Huss Park Attractions	Scandinavia	1993
Voletarium	flying theatre	15 m	Brogent Technologies / Kraftwerk Living Technologies	Germany	2017
Volo da Vinci	suspended pedal-monorail	–	ETF Ride Systems	Italy	2011
Whale Adventures – Northern Lights	Splash Battle	–	Mack Rides	Iceland	2010 (reconstruction in 2015, before: "Whale Adventures – Splash Tours")
Dwarf City	kiddie fairytale ride	–	Mack Rides	Grimm's Enchanted Forest	1975
Vienna Wave Swing	Swing ride	14 m	Zierer	Austria	2006
Würmchen Wies’n	playground	–	–	Austria	2014
Root Slides	Playground	–	–	Minimoys Kingdom	2014

== Business operations and events ==
=== Events ===
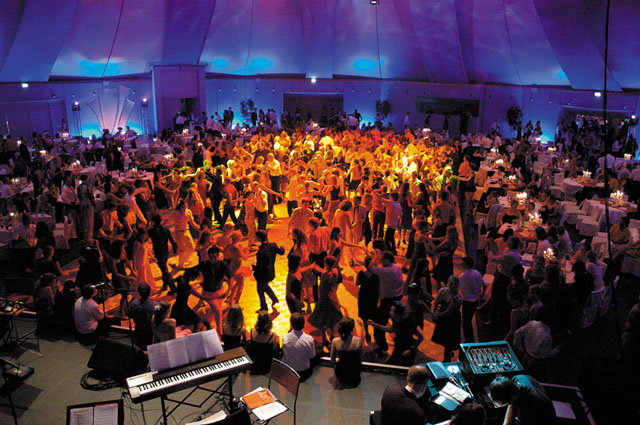
Euro Dance Festival in 2007

Europa-Park hosts dozens of events throughout the summer season and several events during the winter season.

Midsommar event: During this event, the park organizes activities to celebrate the summer solstice, which take place around the lake of the Nordic-themed water world Rulantica and the hotel Krønasår.

Euro Dance Festival: Since 2008, between February and March, the Euro Dance Festival takes place for several days. Participants attend a combination of dancing classes and shows and a trade fair caters for the needs of both beginners and professionals, including dance instructors and choreographers.

Ladies Only Festival: Since 2014 the Ladies Only Festival takes place on one weekend between the months of January and March, when the park is closed for a winter break. On this occasion, the festival connects elements of fitness, dance, health, beauty and wellness. Every year, around 1,400 participants from German-speaking countries attend more than 150 workshops.

Miss Germany Pageant: Since 2002, the official election of Miss Germany has taken place every spring in the Europa-Park Dome.

Dinner Theater: The Europa-Park offers a variety of dinner events on several nights of the year after the amusement park closes. For example, the Dinner Show, the Baden Medieval Banquet as well as the Dinner & Movie.

Science Days: Every year the Europa-Park hosts the Science Days. The Science Days are mainly aimed at schoolchildren and teachers, but also at anyone between the ages of 9 and 99 who is interested in discovering the world of STEM.

CloudFest: Formerly known as WebHostingDays, CloudFest is an annual conference in March about cloud computing aimed at commercial organizations. CloudFest 2022 had 150 exhibitors, 250 speakers, and was attended by 7,200 visitors.

==== Halloween ====
Europa-Park regularly hosts events on special occasions. Since 1998, especially Halloween has been celebrated, with the Halloween season lasting all October. In the last week of the season, the park organizes a Halloween festival, with fireworks every evening and a special Halloween show program. Specials are the daily Halloween parade with over several dozen artists at noon and the evening parade of night ghosts and goblins. Numerous attractions, shows, and food and beverage facilities adopt a Halloween theme as well. In the 2014 season, Europa-Park premiered their independently produced Halloween musical, Spook Me!. The show was performed in the Teatro baroque theatre, several times during the Halloween celebrations between 2014 and 2017.

From 2007 onwards, the park together with Marc Terenzi hosted the Horror Nights for the first time. The project started with the Hell's Inn hotel. The horror house stood in the middle of Europa-Park's French themed area next to the Magic Cinema 4D. At the time, 60 monsters were roaming the hotel and the streets of the area. The Horror Nights have been replaced by the Traumatica - Festival of Fear. It takes place in the evenings, partly in the Greek-themed area and partly outside of the theme park's territory. Visitors are taken into a post-apocalyptic world in which five different groups fight for dominance. The group members are played by live actors and are set up in haunted houses with special effects as their main quarters, which can be attended by visitors. The show includes 5 horror mazes with over 200 performers. Whereas in 2007, under 30 litres (6.6 imp gal; 7.9 US gal) of film blood were used, today it is over 100 litres (22 imp gal; 26 US gal). Also a free show was added over the years which is shown twice every evening; since 2022 it includes The Traumatica Circus: Dystopia, and the Vampire's Club. In 2022, Traumatica received a Scare Award for the best European event from the Dutch Scare Network for the second time.

Located in the Greek themed area in 2006 and from 2007 to 2011 in the Scandinavian themed area, in the show Tortuga - Forgotten Pirates, live scare actors awaited visitors in dark corridors. The show was replaced by The Villa. Designed as a Victorian dream house from the 19th century, the creepy maze in the Greek themed area awaited visitors with special effects in addition to numerous live scares.

Every other year from 2011 through 2016, the park's festival grounds were home to the Halloween show Mysteria, offering live music, artistic performances, pyrotechnics, and lighting effects. During off years, 30-minute concerts by the Swiss DJ BoBo took the place of the show. Starting in 2011, the show was set in a ghostly castle with the title Mysteria: Castillo Mystico. In 2017, the show was replaced by the fountain and fire show Hellfire Fountains, offered multiple times every evening in the last week of the season.

==== Other shows ====
Every day there are also numerous shows with more than 300 international artists.

Prominent shows take place in the revolving theatre multimedia show. Once introduced as "Das lila Geheimnis" (translated: The Purple Secret) about the creation of Milka chocolate, the attraction later showed "Wunder dieser Welt" (translated: Wonder of this World) and after that the show "Zeitreise" (translated: Time travel), which presented Europa-Park's past. In 2010, for the theme park's 35th anniversary, the revolving theatre was redesigned as the Historama with insights into the creation of Europa-Park. This theme was maintained until 2017, before the revolving theatre became part of the Journey to Rulantica as part of an exhibition on the new Europa-Park water park. In 2022, plans wer revealed to replace the current revolving theatre by a new type of Gameplay Theatre from the manufacturer Mack Rides.

In 2018 and 2019, Rulantica - The Musical was shown in the Teatro baroque theatre, located in the Italian themed area, where, previously, the Halloween musical Spook Me! took place. Both musicals were composed by Hendrik Schwarzer; the ensemble included Ornella De Santis, who played the female lead in each case. Since 1999, the annual dinner show "Cirque d'Europe", which changes theme every year, takes place here in winter as well. In 2020, Peter Valance presented his show It's Magic! in the theater.

Opened in 2000, the Globe Theater in Europa-Park's English themed area is a largely accurate smaller replica of the famous London Globe Theatre of William Shakespeare´s time. In the Globe Theatre in the English themed area, amongst others, the show Times Three - the Acrobatic Show attracts visitors during the summer season.

In addition, other productions are hosted in the Spanish Arena, like medieval knight games; and in the ice stadium, like Paddington on Ice. In 2022, the park presented the show ACE – The Adventure Begins in the ice stadium.

Since 2008, the park collaborated with DJ Bobo on different occasions.

=== Winter events ===
In 2001, Europa-Park opened for its first winter season. During the winter season, the rides at Europa-Park are in operation as usual. In addition to the rides, the focus is on the shows. In winter, the park opens an ice rink, a skibob track, the Big Wheel Bellevue and adds festive decor. The park is also home to an annual Christmas market. Since 2002, the park has been hosting an annual Weihnachtsmann-Treffen (translated: Santa Claus Convention). During winter, most outdoor and/or water rides are closed. The circus revue is the flagship of the theme park's winter season. It includes professional productions on the ground and in the air. In keeping with the cold season, there is an ice show as well, with figure skaters performing acrobatics and choreographies.

=== 4D cinema ===
The park's 4D cinema screens different 15-minute short films, the latest being Happy Family Next Level (2022). In the evenings after the park closes, current cinema films are shown, often complemented by the additional 4D effects.

=== TV production ===
Channels, such as BR, Sat.1, SWR, ZDF, Nickelodeon and Prosieben produce shows in the park. Each year since the summer of 1995, SWR has been airing its show called Immer wieder sonntags, which has been hosted by Stefan Mross since 2005. The production was moved to the nearby water park Rulantica in 2022.

== Accommodation ==
=== Europa-Park Resort ===
The six hotels and the Europa-Park Camp Resort are combined in the so-called Europa-Park Hotel-Resort. Hotel operations are taking on an increasingly important role in park operations. With its hotels and an expansion of the offers, the park has developed into a tourist destination for visitors who stay for several days. It is no longer - like other parks - solely dependent on day visitors and the weather or on individual target groups. Further, Europa-Park is also home to the restaurant Ammolite - The Lighthouse. Under Peter Hagen-Wiest, it has been awarded two Michelin stars.

==== Hotels ====
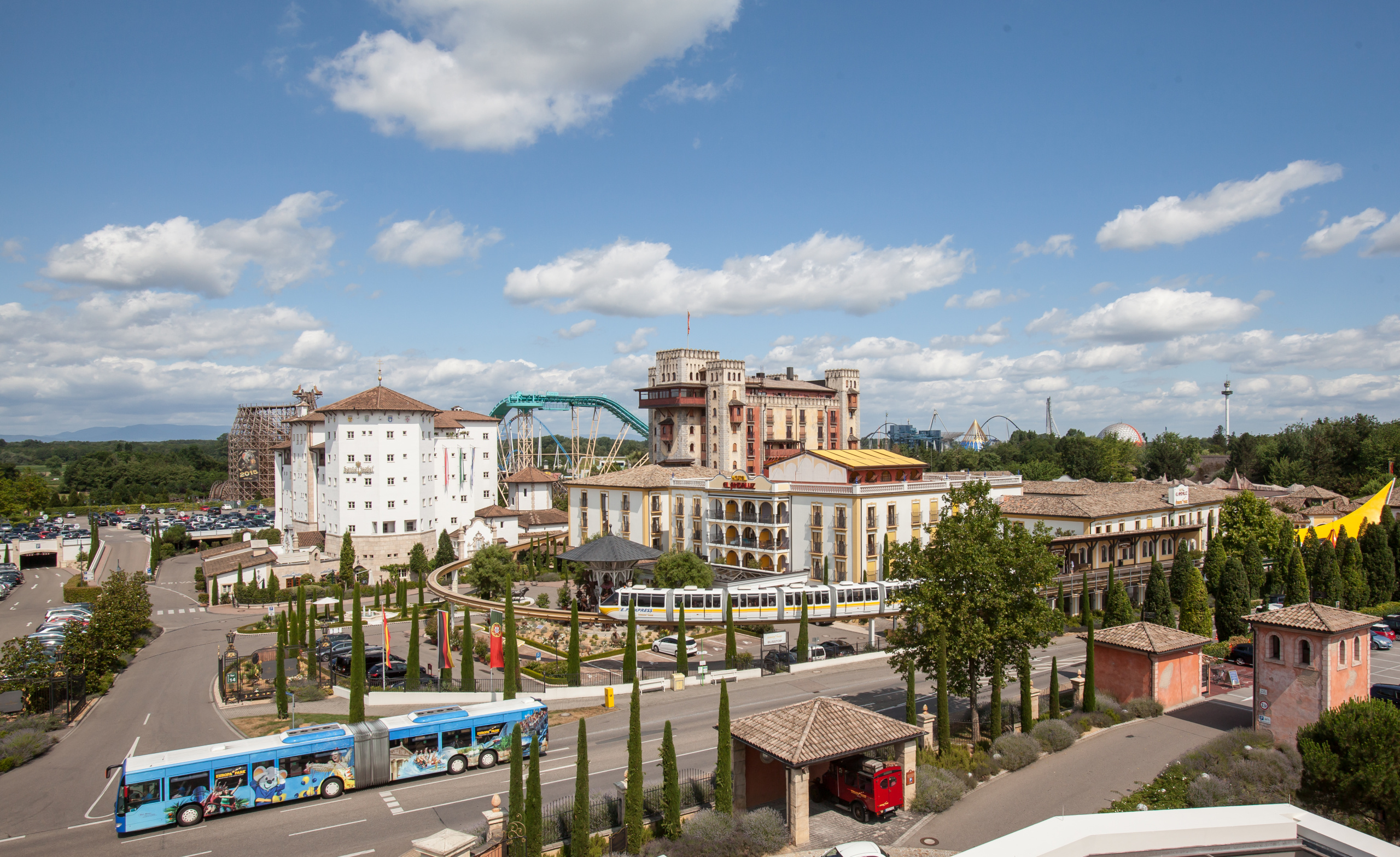
Hotels Santa Isabel, El Andaluz and Castillo Alcazar

- Hotel Colosseo (four star superior), Italian themed
- Hotel Santa Isabel (four star superior), themed around a Portuguese Monastery
- Hotel El Andaluz (four stars), themed as a Spanish Villa
- Hotel Castillo Alcazar (four stars), themed as a Spanish castle
- Hotel Bell Rock (four star superior), themed around New England and features a lighthouse
- Hotel Krønasår (four star superior), themed as a natural history museum that shows unique and historical objects collected by the Adventure Club of Europe

==== Europa-Park Camp-Resort ====
The Europa-Park Camp-Resort consists of a tipi village and caravanning. In the tipi village, there are tipi tents, log cabins and covered wagons as overnight accommodation. They are arranged in a small western village around a lake, where the "Silverlake Saloon" restaurant is located. At Europa-Park Caravanning, visitors have 200 pitches for caravans, motorhomes and tents at their disposal.

==== Confertainment Center ====
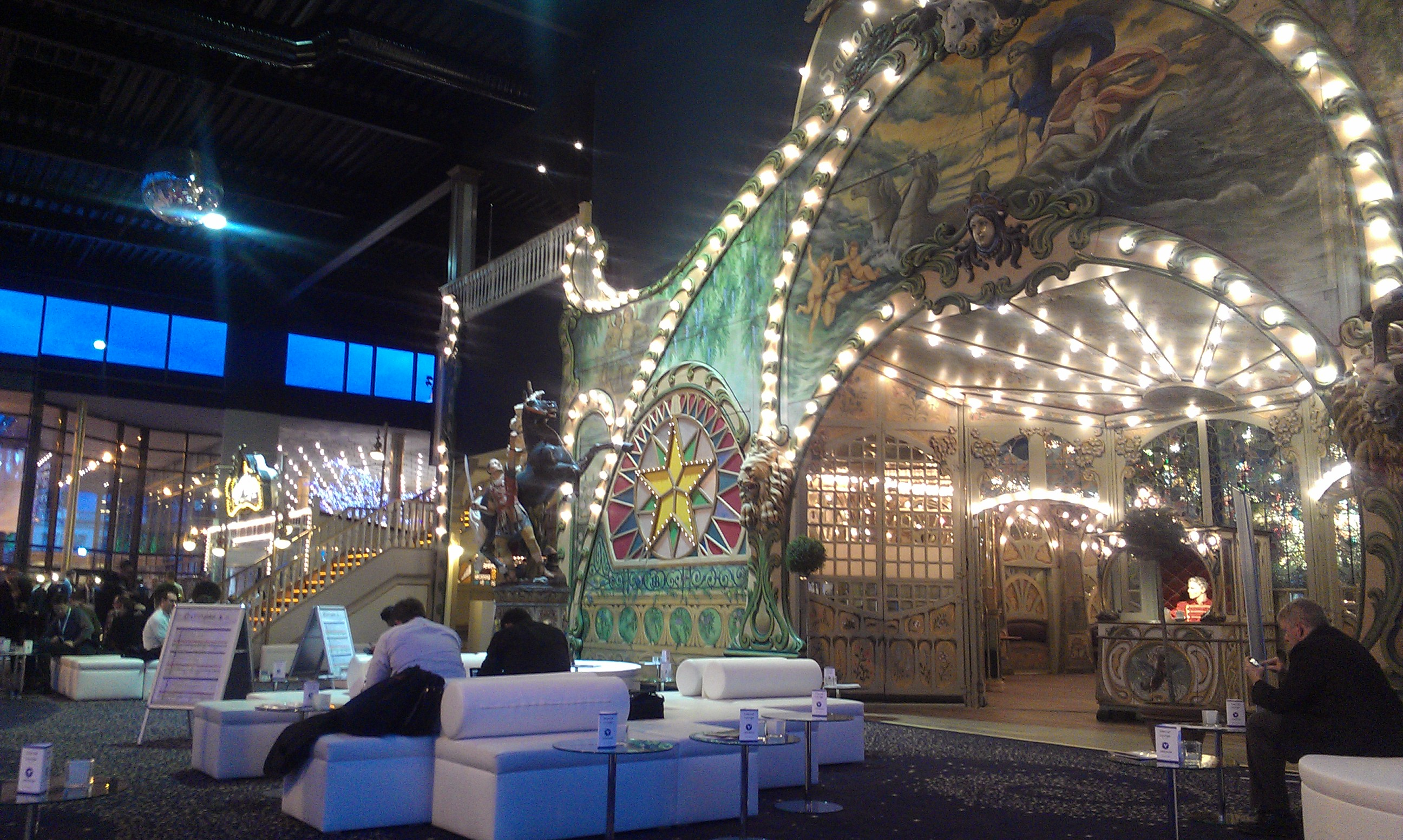
Interior of the Confertainment Center with the Eden Palladium entrance on the right

In addition to numerous smaller halls in the hotels and rooms that are otherwise used by the public, Europa-Park has its own event center next to the main entrance. In 2017, the Europa-Park Arena, a hall with three thousand square meters, was opened, which among other things has a gallery. The offer is complemented by smaller conference rooms, which are connected by a common foyer. The larger halls at the park are the Europa-Park Dome, a tent-shaped hall with a round floor plan and a size of 1,250 square metres (13,500 sq ft), and the Ballroom Berlin, a room that can be divided in the middle and has a total area of eight hundred square meters. Access is from outside the park to allow independent use. As a special feature, the Ballroom Berlin also has its own foyer, which can also be used as a conference room, as well as direct access from the park.

===== Eden Palladium salon carousel =====
The Eden Palladium is a historic carousel located within the Europa-Park Confertainment Center. It was originally built in 1909 by Gustave Bayol in Angers, France, and was opened at its current location in 2012. The carousel was installed in the Confertainment Center instead of inside Europa-Park due to its fragile state and its inability to accommodate large theme park crowds. It is one of only four salon carousels that still exist.

== Transportation ==
=== On-site transportation ===
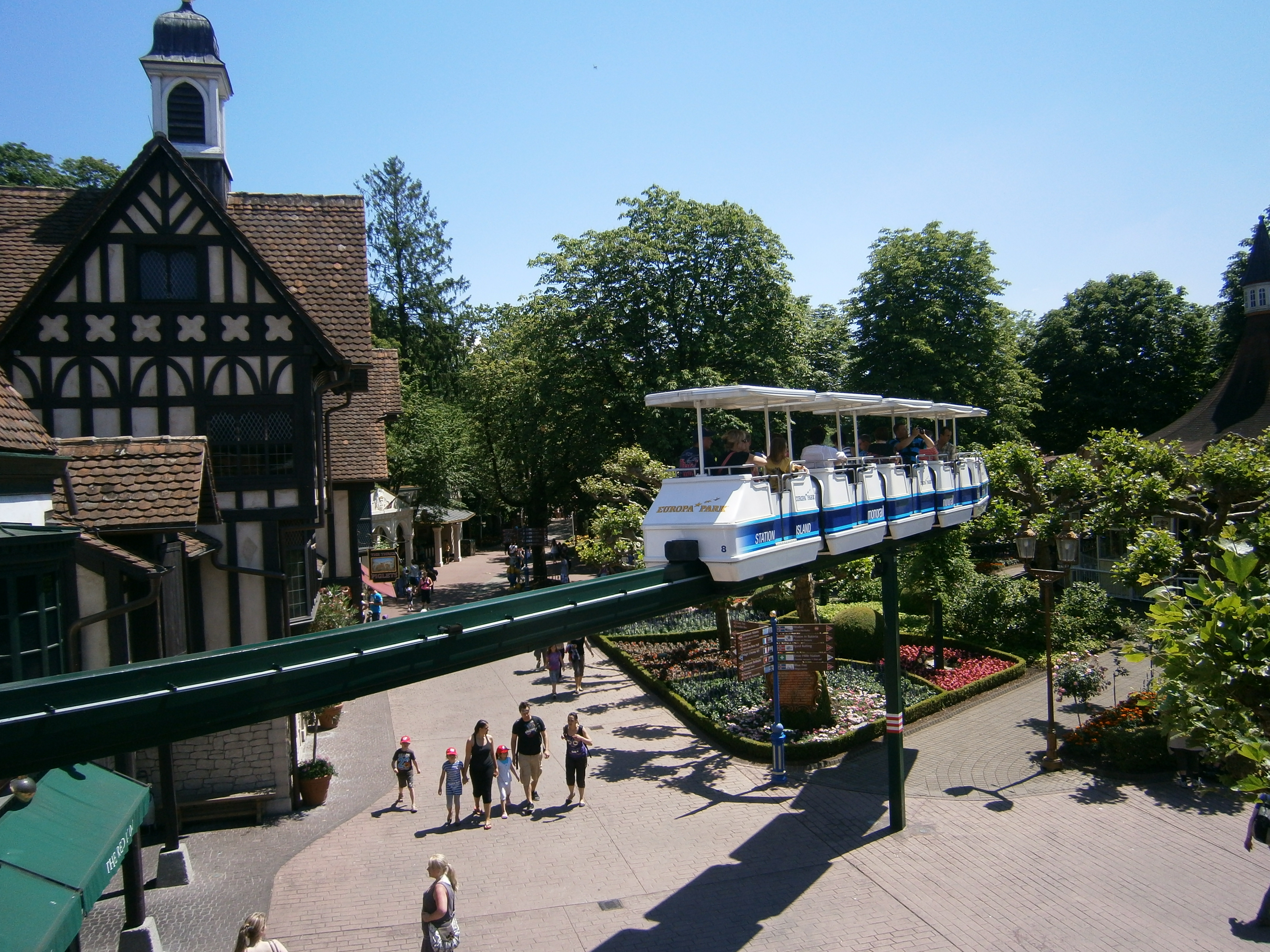
The monorail

Due to the size of the park, the three trains, EP-Express, Monorail-Bahn and Panoramabahn serve as a means of transport in addition to their function as rides.

The Panoramabahn - a miniature train ride - has been installed since the opening of the park in 1975. The trains are C. P. Huntington trains that were originally built by Chance Rides. At first, it served as a sightseeing train which departed and arrived near the entrance of the park in the area Germany. Today, the train also stops at train stations in the areas England, Spain, and Russia. The trains have since been rebuilt by SEW Eurodrive, removing the combustion engine and converting the locomotives to environmentally friendly electrification.

The Monorail-Bahn was put into operation in 1990 and was originally intended for sightseeing only, with its starting and finishing point inside the Historama in Luxembourg. In 2009, the monorail was extended by an additional stop in Iceland allowing passengers to use it as a means of transportation.

The EP-Express - another elevated monorail - operates in the park since 1995. Inaugurated together with the Hotel El Andaluz in 1995, one of the purposes of the EP-Express was to connect the hotel to the main entrance. Now, it runs a 2.5 kilometres (1.6 mi) circuit and also connects the hotel complex with other stations.

In 2021, the park operators got the permission to build an additional elevated railway system that will connect Europa-Park with its neighbouring park Rulantica. In addition, a moving walkway called Express Lane was put into operation in the park's parking lot park in 2015.

=== Connection to the park ===
Europa-Park is located in Rust, Baden, between Freiburg im Breisgau and Offenburg, west of the A5 motorway. Since 2002, the park has had its own junction and access road. The Rhine, which forms the border with France here, is 2.5 kilometres (1.6 mi) away. The nearest border crossing is the ferry between Kappel-Grafenhausen and Rhinau, 7 kilometres (4.3 mi) away. The nearest railway station is Ringsheim, from where regional trains run to Offenburg, among others. Since 1 June 2021, Ringsheim has also been a long-distance stop, on the way of the EuroCity Express from Frankfurt to Milan. Since then, the park has been also connected to the German high-speed rail system, and since 2022 Europa-Park has also been connected to the French high-speed rail system. The Südbadenbus (SBG) runs several times a day between Ringsheim station and the park's main entrance. Direct buses also run from Emmendingen and Herbolzheim. Lines 271 and 531 of Réseau 67, the public transport system of the Département Bas Rhin, connect the park with Strasbourg and Sélestat. Europa-Park can also be reached by long-distance buses operated by Flixbus. Services 007 (Zurich-Hamburg), 008 (Freiburg-Tübingen) and 011 (Constance-Saarbrücken) stop at Rheinweg, about 100 metres (330 ft) from the main entrance. Europa-Park can also be reached by scheduled flights via Karlsruhe/Baden-Baden airport, from where shuttle services are offered.

== Bibliography ==
- Borman, Regina (2000). "Event machinery experience park: system integration through performative institutions". Events: Soziologie des Außergewöhnlichen (Erlebniswelten) [Eventmaschinerie Erlebnispark: System integration through performative institutions]. Erlebniswelten (in German). Vol. 2. Leske + Budrich Verlag. ISBN 978-3-322-95155-7.
- Carlà-Uhink, Filippo (2020). Representations of Classical Greece in Theme Parks. IMAGINES – Classical Receptions in the Visual and Performing Arts (1st ed.). Bloomsbury Publishing. ISBN 978-1-4742-9786-8.
- Clavé, Salvador Anton (2007). The Global Theme Park Industry. Wallingford: CAB International. ISBN 978-1-84593-208-4.
- Müller, Siegfried (2016). Kultur in Deutschland: Vom Kaiserreich bis zur Wiedervereinigung [Culture in Germany: From the Empire to Reunification] (in German). Kohlhammer Verlag. ISBN 978-3-17-031846-5.
- Stieber, Benno (2014). Roland Mack: Herr der Achterbahnen [Roland Mack: King of fun] (in German) (1st ed.). Verlag Herder. ISBN 978-3-451-80215-7.

== See also ==
- List of amusement parks in Europe
- Mack Rides
