= Euro-Mir =

Spinning roller coaster at Europa-Park

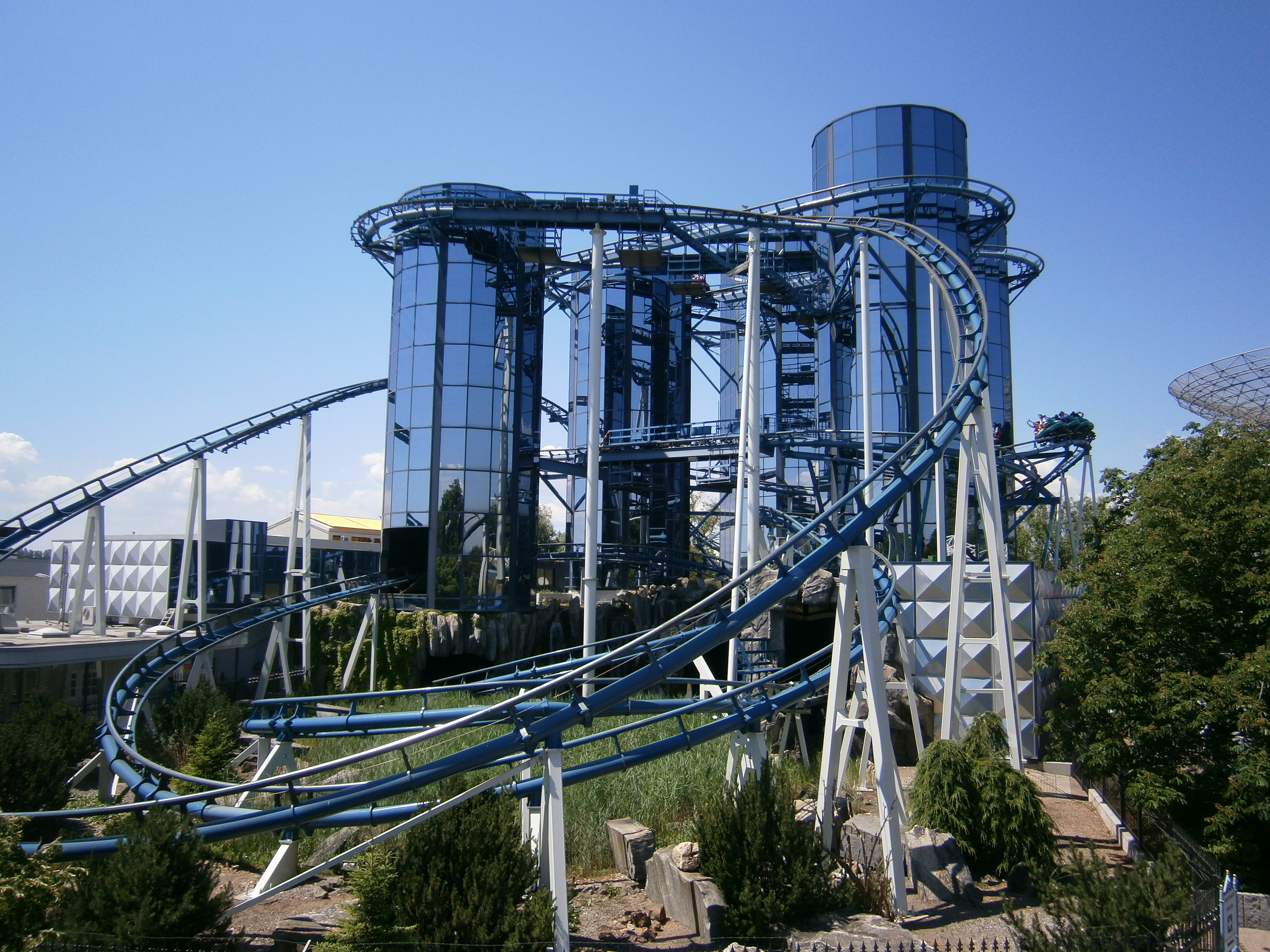

Europa-Park
- Location: Europa-Park
- Park section: Russia
- Coordinates: 48°15′53″N 7°43′11″E
- Status: Operating
- Opening date: June 12, 1997

General statistics
- Type: Steel – Spinning
- Manufacturer: Mack Rides
- Designer: Franz Mack
- Lift/launch system: Spiral lift
- Height: 92 ft (28 m)
- Length: 3,215.3 ft (980.0 m)
- Speed: 49.7 mph (80.0 km/h)
- Duration: 4:33
- Capacity: 1600 riders per hour
- G-force: 4
- Height restriction: 51 in (130 cm)
- Website: Official website
- Euro-Mir at RCDB

Euro-Mir is a space-themed spinning roller coaster located at Europa-Park in Rust, Germany. Unlike most spinning coasters, the cars do not spin freely, but are rotated by motors at set points during the ride. It was designed by Franz Mack and opened in 1997.

The ride is modeled on the Soviet/Russian space station Mir. It consists of five cylindrical towers, with the ride simulating a trip into space and re-entry into the Earth's atmosphere. The largest tower, which contains the helical lift hill, is a dodecagon, 25 feet (7.6 m) across and 92 feet (28 m) high while the maximum drop of the ride is 86 feet (26 m). The ride opened in 1997 and carries nine trains, each comprising four circular spinning cars. Riders are seated back to back in pairs, with a maximum of 16 riders per train.

The attraction's theming was designed by P&P Projects.

On March 25, 2026, Europa Park announced that the 2026 season would be the last season of operation for Euro-Mir and that it would close for redevelopment at the end of the season.

== Awards ==
Golden Ticket Awards: Top steel Roller Coasters
Year									1998	1999
Ranking									–	–
Year	2000	2001	2002	2003	2004	2005	2006	2007	2008	2009
Ranking	–	–	–	23	31	32	34	–	40 (tie)	43
Year	2010	2011	2012	2013	2014	2015	2016	2017	2018	2019
Ranking	45	–	50	–	42	–	40 (tie)	45	45	–
Year	2020	2021	2022	2023	2024	2025				
Ranking	N/A	–	–	–	–	–				
