= Pirates in Batavia =

Water dark ride at Europa-Park

Pirates in Batavia Piraten in Batavia
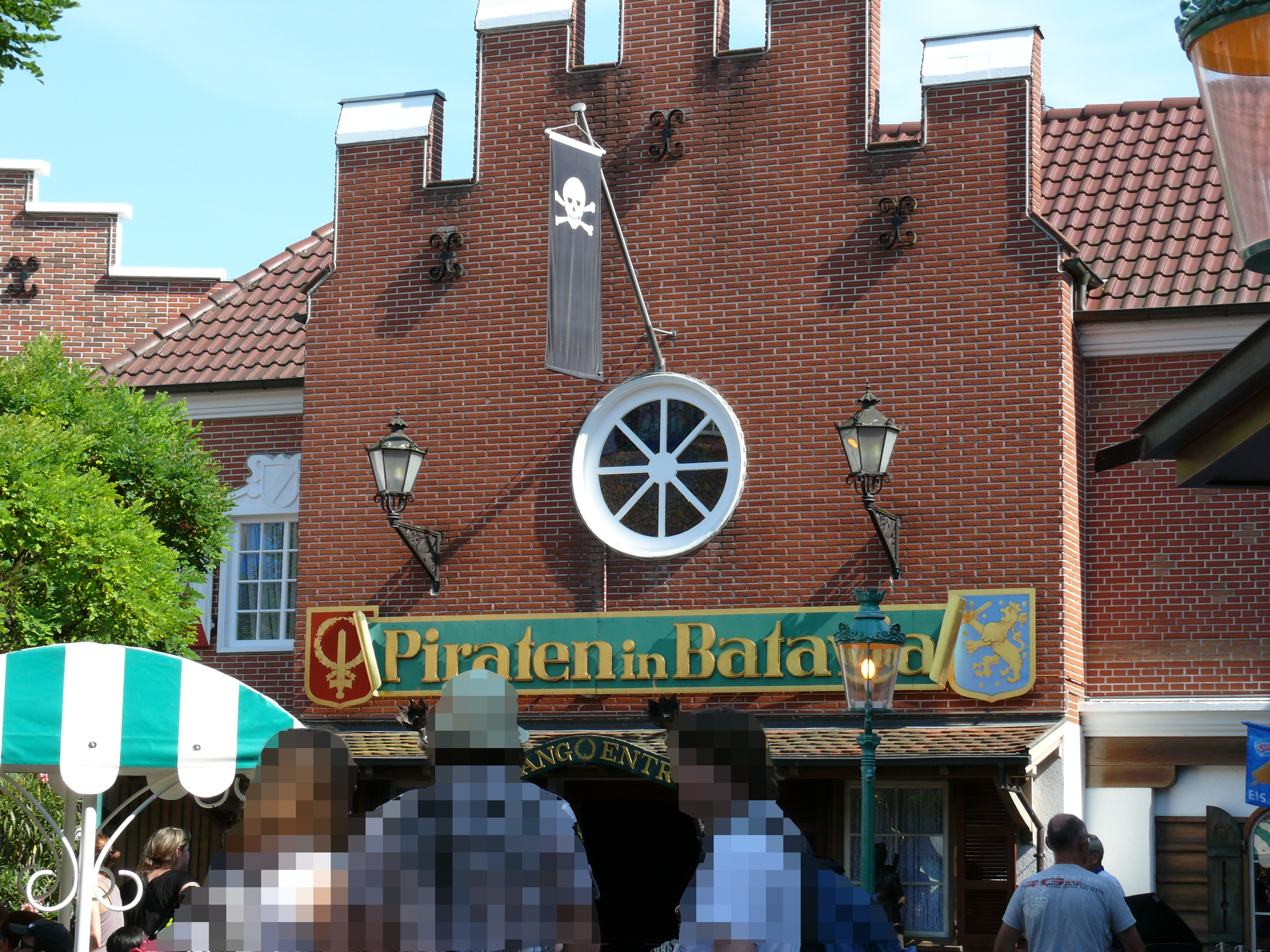
- The attraction entrance at Europa-Park

Europa-Park
- Area: Netherlands
- Coordinates: 48°15′49″N 7°43′11″E
- Status: Operating
- Opening date: 1987 (reopened 28 July 2020)
- Closing date: 26 May 2018

Ride statistics
- Manufacturer: Mack Rides
- Model: Dark ride
- Theme: Pirate raid on Jakarta
- Drop: 5 m (16 ft)
- Length: 400 m (1,300 ft)
- Speed: 2.9 km/h (1.8 mph)
- Site area: 3,800 m^{2} (41,000 sq ft)
- Capacity: max. 2000 riders per hour
- Vehicle type: Boat
- Vehicles: 22
- Riders per vehicle: 16
- Rows: 4
- Riders per row: 4
- Duration: 7:30 mins
- Handicapped persons: Not suitable for handicapped persons, according to TÜV-restricitions

Pirates in Batavia (2020) (German Piraten in Batavia) is a water dark ride at Europa-Park that opened originally in 1987 and reopened on July 28, 2020. It was rebuilt in place of the old ride by the same name, which burned down in a fire in 2018. The ride was built by Mack Rides and is situated in a large hall at the Dutch themed area, which was designed as a typical Dutch clinker brick building from the outside.

Its theming is based on Indonesia, which the Dutch colonized from 1596 to 1942.

== Theming ==
The ride is set during a pirate raid on Jakarta (known as Batavia until 1942) in the 17th century at the beginning of the Dutch colonization of Indonesia.

== Ride ==
The building of the ride was characterized with a banner labeled with "Piraten in Batavia" in golden letters and a Jolly Roger. The station was situated on the first floor. On their way to the station, visitors were introduced to the backstory, while learning about the history of the Dutch colonisation of Indonesia, shown in different animated scenes. Mural paintings showed the Java Sea, including the maps of Sumatra, Kalimantan and Java.

At the station the visitors got on one of the boats, each with a capacity of 16 riders. The first scene showed a cave in the Indonesian jungle, which was inhabited by different animals and humans. After a wide bend, the boat went down a waterfall and passed through a battle scene, in which a pirate ship attacked a nearby fort. The scene was dominated by screaming pirates and gunfire. Through a break in the fortification wall, the boat arrived in Batavia, which was full of marauding pirates. In the following scenes the visitor experienced how the pirates won over the native women, staving off their hunger by eating exotic animals and getting drunk. The ride carried on passing a hidden temple in the jungle, a burning fort, a fishermen's village and a jail.

Just before the end of the ride, the boats passed a show venue on the right, which was embedded into the setting, and the themed restaurant Bamboe Baai.

== Fire ==
On 26 May 2018, Pirates in Batavia burned to the ground in a fire that destroyed the main themed area of the Scandinavia portion of the park. The cause of the fire is unknown, but a fireball erupted in a storage hall and spread towards the ride building resulting in high flames and a smoke plume stretching for miles. At first, the area was evacuated, but this was later revised to include the whole park. The park re-opened on Sunday, albeit with the Scandinavia and Norwegian sections of the ride closed. Two attractions, the 'Fjord-Rafting' and the 'Dschungel-Floßfahrt' remained closed, as firefighters had used water from those attractions to battle the fire.
