= Eurosat - CanCan Coaster =

Enclosed roller coaster at Europa-Park

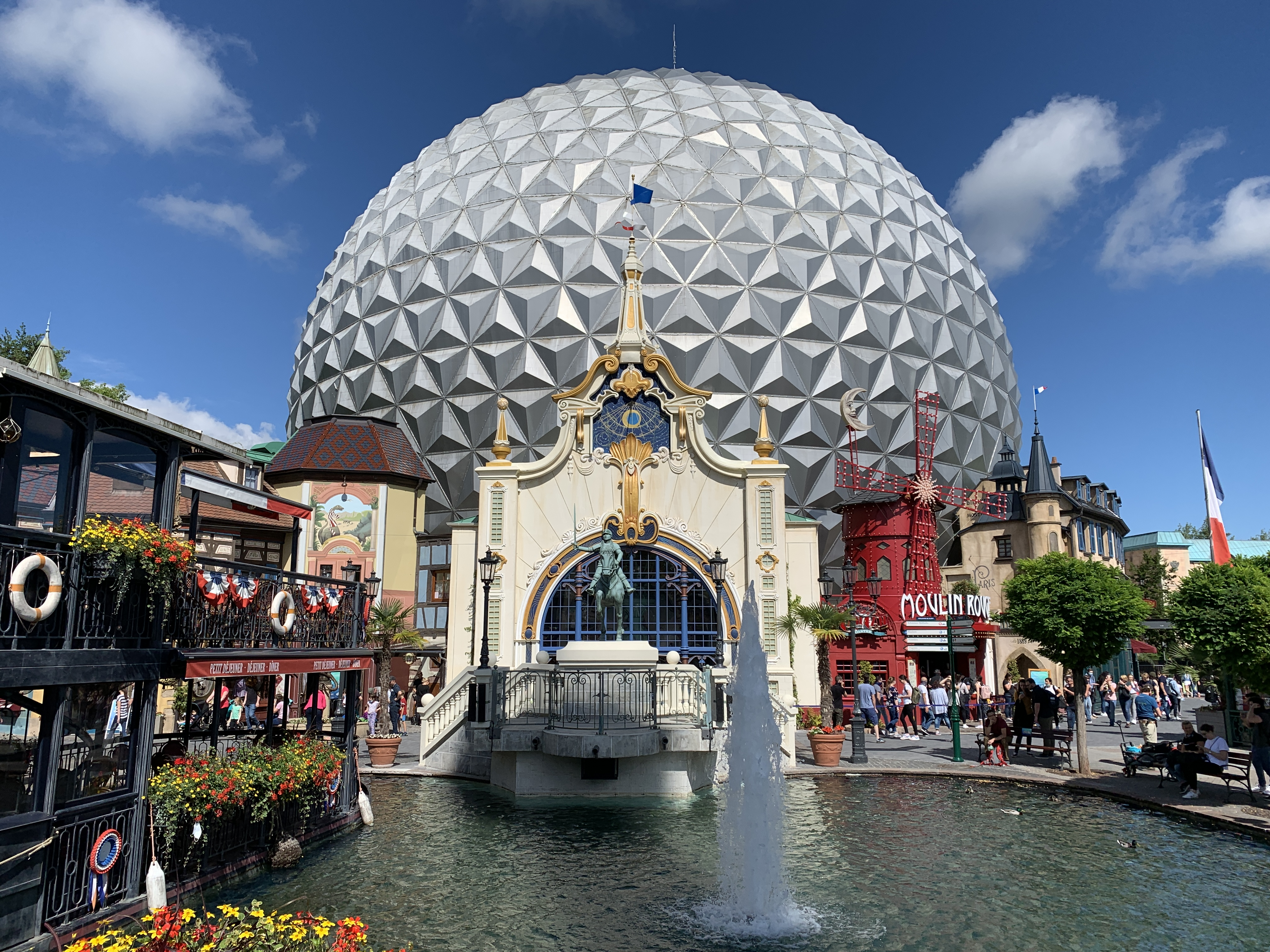
- Eurosat from outside in 2020

Europa-Park
- Location: Europa-Park
- Park section: France
- Coordinates: 48°16′2.66″N 7°43′14.75″E
- Status: Operating
- Opening date: 1989 (as Eurosat); September 2018 (as Eurosat - CanCan Coaster)
- Closing date: November 5, 2017 (as Eurosat)
- Replaced: Eurosat

General statistics
- Type: Steel – Enclosed
- Manufacturer: Mack Rides
- Lift/launch system: Spiral lift
- Height: 25.5 m (84 ft)
- Length: 900 m (3,000 ft)
- Speed: 60 km/h (37 mph)
- Inversions: 0
- Duration: 3:18
- Max vertical angle: 32°
- Capacity: 1280 riders per hour
- G-force: 4
- Height restriction: 120 cm (3 ft 11 in)
- Trains: 7 trains with 8 cars; riders arranged 2 across in a single row for a total of 16 riders per train
- Website: Official website
- Age restriction: min 6 years
- Handicapped persons: Not suitable for handicapped persons, according to TÜV-restrictions.
- Single rider line available
- Eurosat - CanCan Coaster at RCDB

Eurosat - CanCan Coaster is an enclosed roller coaster at Europa-Park in Rust, Germany. The ride is situated inside a 45-metre (148 ft) high geodesic dome, a notable landmark in the park. Originally opening in 1989, Eurosat was heavily refurbished between 2017 and 2018, which featured the addition of new track and some minor layout changes, as well as the construction of a virtual reality experience with its own separate station. Eurosat - CanCan Coaster opened in September 2018.

== History ==
=== Eurosat (1989–2017) ===
Eurosat originally opened in 1989 in the French area of the park, and was manufactured by Mack Rides. Its design is similar to the geosphere that had opened in Epcot seven years earlier. The original Eurosat opened on August 5, 1989, and was themed to spaceflight. Riders queue for the attraction in a covered waiting area at the front of the dome, before ascending up escalators to the station area. On leaving the station, the train climbs a spiral lift hill in the center of the dome, before continuing down a long course of drops and turns alongside lasers and light effects.

During special events, the exterior of the dome was decorated. During the winter season, the dome has been wrapped in a large ribbon, and during the 2006 FIFA World Cup the dome became a large soccer ball. Throughout the park's Halloween events, the dome was decorated as a giant pumpkin, and renamed as Pumpkin Coaster.

From 2000 to 2017, the Eurosat featured a techno soundtrack produced by the group Stark Fader, called In a 2nd Orbit. During Halloween and the winter season, the soundtrack was replaced with seasonal music.

=== Eurosat - CanCan Coaster (2018–present) ===
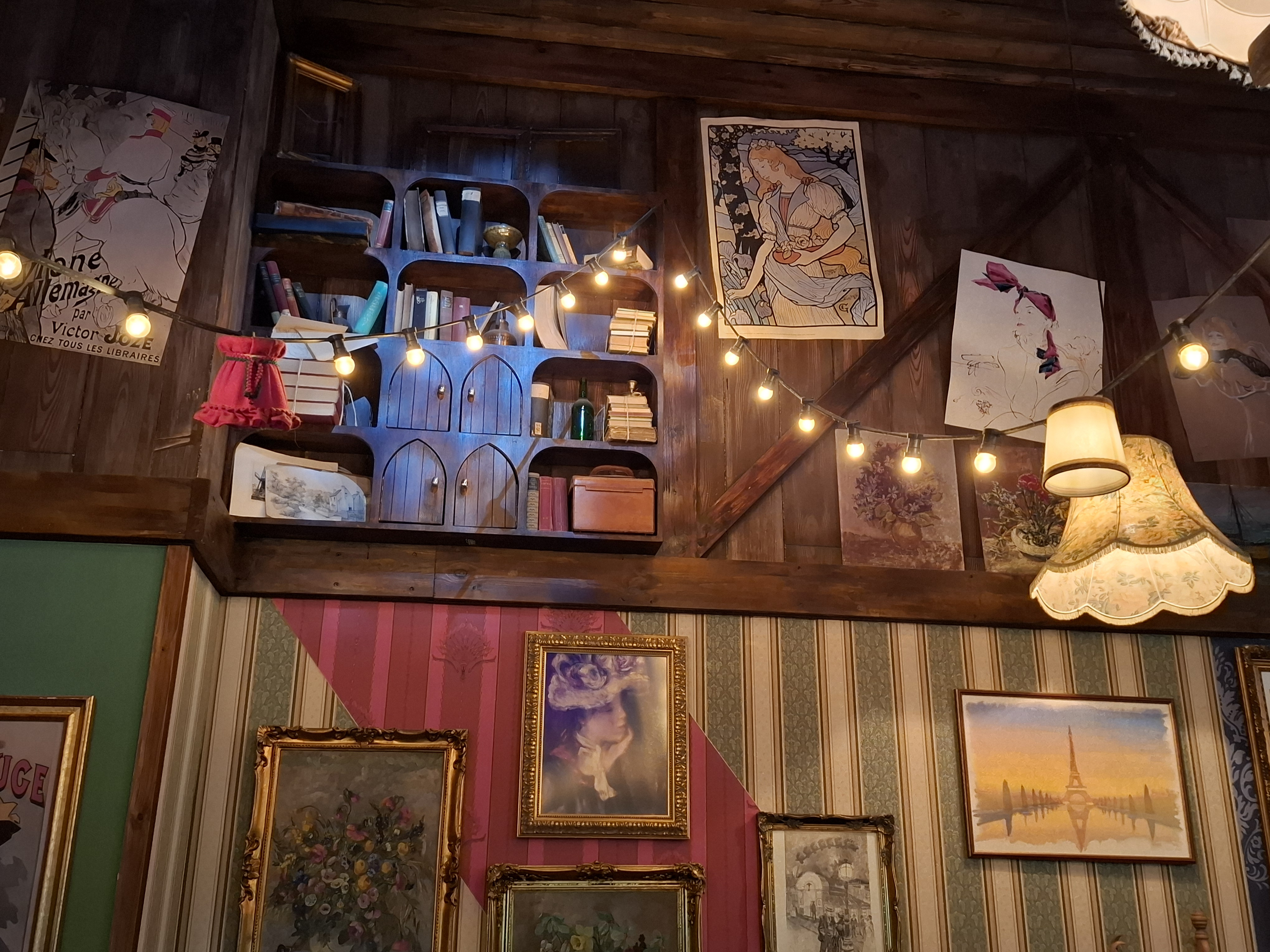
One of the waiting areas of Eurosat

In June 2017, Europa-Park announced that the ride would receive a major refurbishment entailing completely new track, some minor layout changes and a virtual reality experience that will have its own separate station and queue. The park code-named the refurbishment Eurosat 2.0. Work began on November 5, 2017, with much of the sphere dismantled in order to install the new ride. In January 2018 was known that the name would be Eurosat - CanCan Coaster and the coaster was themed after the Moulin Rouge. The soundtrack was composed and produced by Eric Babak. The VR experience was made by Coastiality and themed to the 2017 film, Valerian and the City of a Thousand Planets, before closing in 2024 and reopening as an experience themed to the musical, The Phantom of the Opera, that same year. The coastiality queue was re-themed with the new VR experience. Eurosat - CanCan Coaster officially reopened on September 12, 2018.

== Characteristics ==
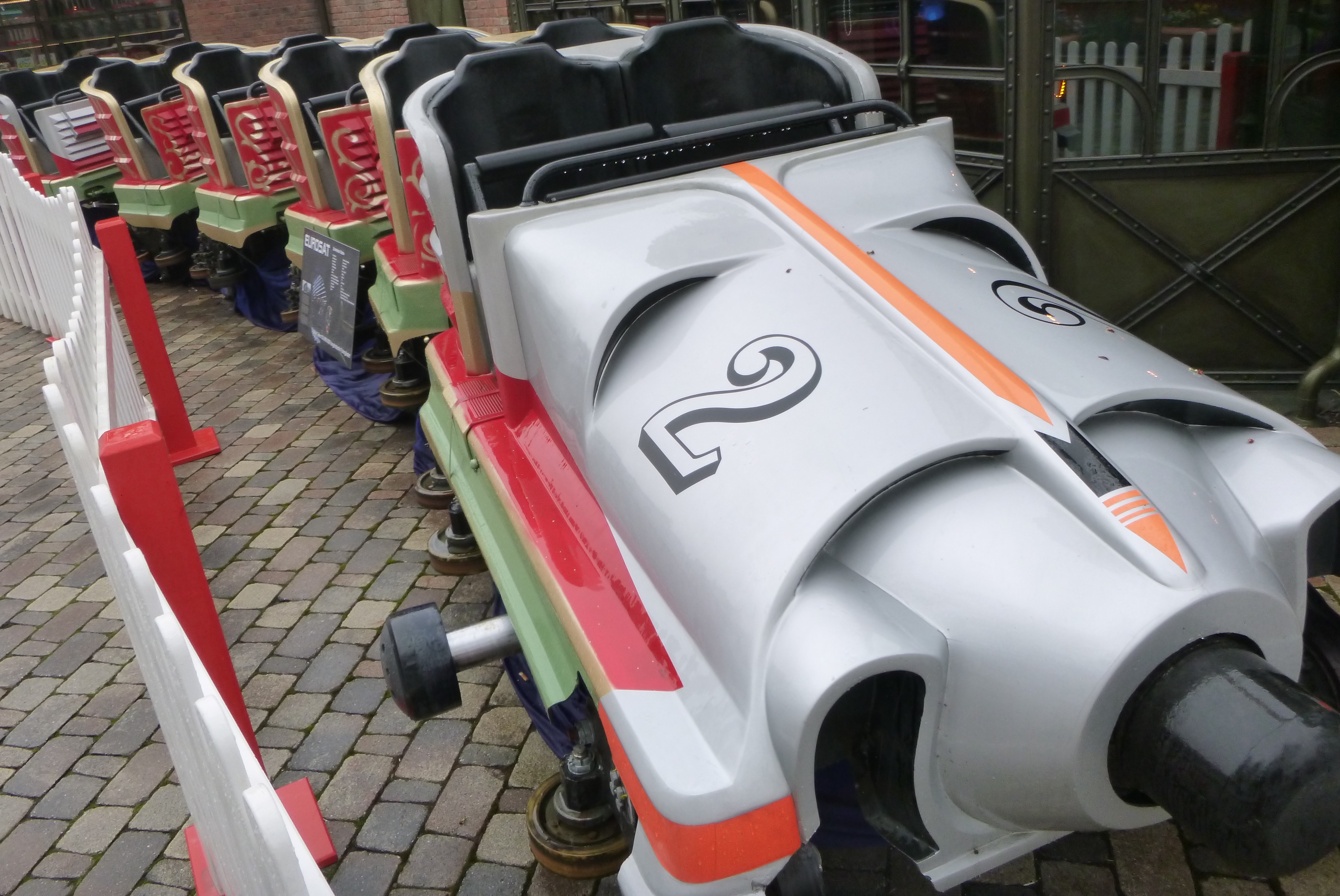
Former Eurosat's train

=== Statistics ===
Eurosat - CanCan Coaster is 83.7 feet (25.5 m) tall, 3,024.8 feet (922.0 m) long, and reaches a top speed of 37.3 mph (60.0 km/h) throughout the ride.

=== Trains ===
The ride has seven trains, although only six are operated at the same time. Each train can seat 16 people across eight rows. During regular operation, the ride can handle 1600 people per hour.

Since retiring, Eurosat's original trains have been repurposed elsewhere. A full train has since been on display at the park, located near the Euro Tower. In 2022, a full train was donated to the National Roller Coaster Museum and Archives in Plainview, Texas, while another car was installed on the roof of Europa Park's Ringsheim train station. Yet another ride car was auctioned off at the IAAPA Expo Europe in 2023.
