= Atlantica SuperSplash =

Water coaster at Europa-Park

Europa-Park
- Location: Europa-Park
- Park section: Portugal
- Coordinates: 48°15′44″N 7°43′16″E
- Opening date: 19 March 2005
- Cost: €5 million

General statistics
- Type: Steel
- Manufacturer: Mack Rides
- Model: SuperSplash
- Height: 30 m (98 ft)
- Drop: 30 m (98 ft)
- Length: 390 m (1,280 ft)
- Speed: 80 km/h (50 mph)
- Duration: 3:20
- Max vertical angle: 50°
- Capacity: 1,400 riders per hour
- G-force: 4
- Height restriction: 100 cm (3 ft 3 in)
- Website: Official website
- Atlantica SuperSplash at RCDB

Atlantica SuperSplash is a water coaster in Europa-Park, Germany. Built by Mack Rides, it opened on 19 March 2005. The ride is themed around the Conquistadors of the Portuguese Empire. It is the prototype for identical roller coasters at three other parks around the world. There are also two other SuperSplash coasters with custom layouts, including Journey to Atlantis at SeaWorld San Antonio.

== Characteristics ==
Atlantica SuperSplash was constructed by Mack Rides. It is a SuperSplash water coaster featuring two drops, the highest being 30 metres (98 ft). There is a 9 m (30 ft) drop between the lift hill and main drop. Two turntables enable boats to take this drop in reverse. There is a small airtime hill after the main drop before boats make their ultimate splashdown.

The roller coaster has six boats, each seating guests in four rows of four and restrained with lap bars. Each boat weighs 5 tonnes.

The lake surrounding the ride has an area of 4,400 m^{2} (47,000 sq ft). Under the surface of the water after the drop, a series of magnets can control the speed at which boats enter the water. In this way, the size of the splash can be controlled depending on how warm the weather is that day.

Roller coasters of identical design have been at Chimelong Ocean Kingdom, Colourful Yunnan Paradise and Formosan Aboriginal Culture Village. Journey to Atlantis at SeaWorld San Antonio is almost identical, but lacks the small airtime hill after the main drop.
