= Blue Fire =

Launched roller coaster at Europa-Park

Blue Fire Megacoaster
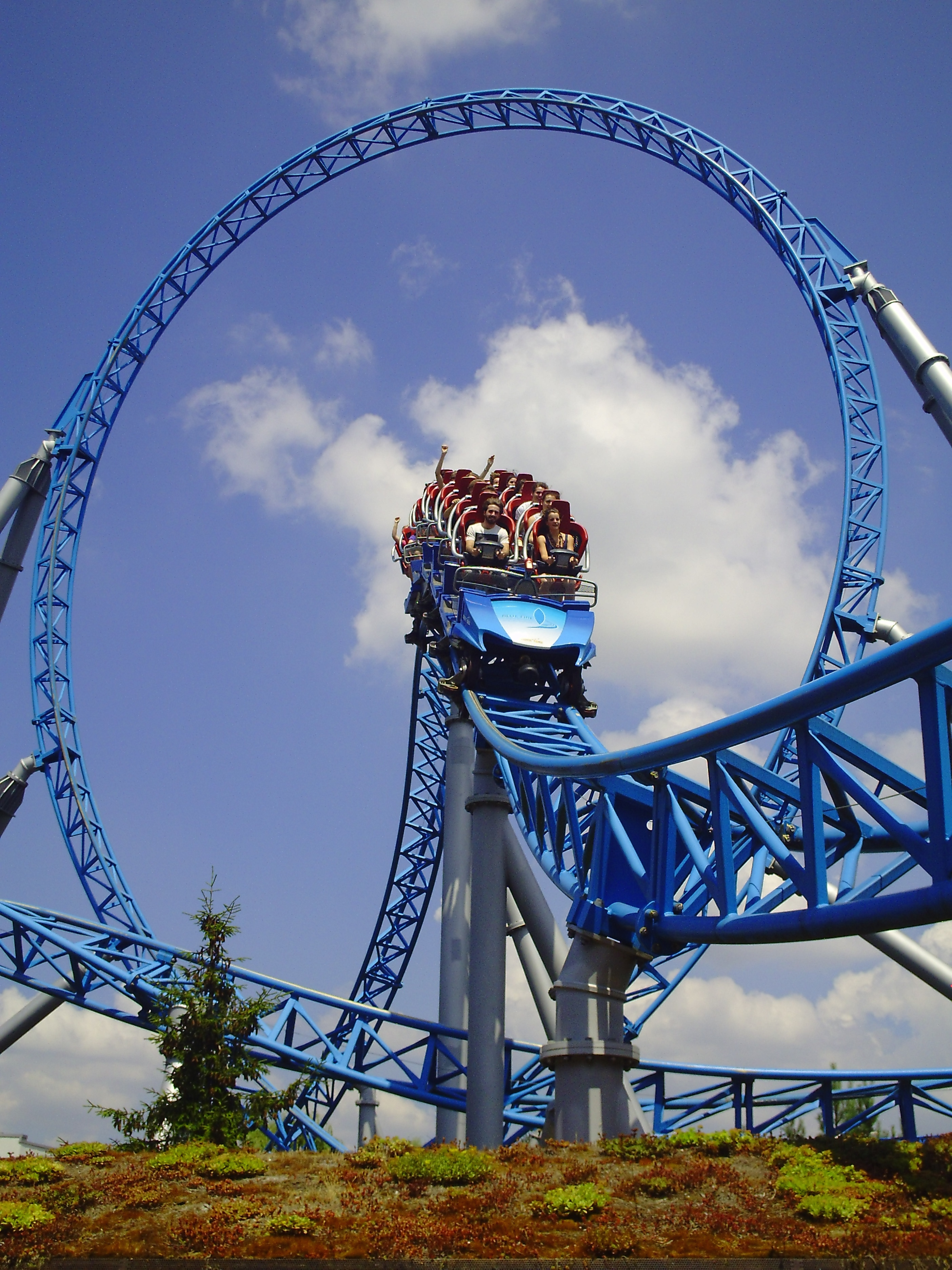

Europa-Park
- Location: Europa-Park
- Park section: Iceland
- Coordinates: 48.2624°N 7.71847°E
- Status: Operating
- Opening date: April 4, 2009

General statistics
- Type: Steel – Launched
- Manufacturer: Mack Rides
- Model: Launch Coaster
- Lift/launch system: LSM launch
- Height: 124 ft (38 m)
- Length: 3,464.6 ft (1,056.0 m)
- Speed: 62 mph (100 km/h)
- Inversions: 4
- Duration: 2:20
- Capacity: 1,450 riders per hour
- Acceleration: 0 to 62.1 mph in 2.5 seconds
- G-force: 3.8
- Height restriction: 51 in (130 cm)
- Trains: 5 trains with 5 cars; riders arranged 2 across in 2 rows for a total of 20 riders per train
- Website: Official website
- Single rider line available
- Blue Fire Megacoaster at RCDB

Video

Blue Fire megacoaster is a launched roller coaster at Europa-Park. The coaster opened in 2009 as part of a new Iceland-themed expansion to Europa-Park. As the first launched coaster built by Mack Rides, Blue Fire was the park's tenth roller coaster and the first to feature inversions. Originally, the ride was sponsored by Gazprom, but after the invasion of Ukraine launched by Russia on 24th February 2022, the sponsorship was dropped, due to Gazprom being owned by the Russian government. The ride's tagline is "Discover Pure Energy".

== Layout ==
Blue Fire is a combination of a dark ride and a launched roller coaster. The ride begins with a dark ride portion lasting roughly 45 seconds. The train is then accelerated to 100 km/h (62 mph) in 2.5 seconds using a linear synchronous motor launch, along an 80-metre (262 ft 6 in)-long launch track.

The launch propels the train over a turn that peaks at 38 metres (124 ft 8 in) high. Then, the turn leads into a vertical loop 32 metres (105 ft 0 in) high, which is the tallest loop on any launched roller coaster in Europe. One turn culminates in a mid-course brake run; and, exiting the brake run, the train completes a twisted horseshoe roll that partially passes over a lake. One airtime hill follows, and the ride ends with a heartline roll and final brake run.

Blue Fire's twisted horseshoe roll was the first on any roller coaster in Europe and the first on any Mack roller coaster. The element itself had only previously appeared on one other roller coaster, making its debut on Maverick at Cedar Point.

Mack Rides sells a modified version of Blue Fire's layout, which excludes the opening dark ride section. A rather egregious example is Battle for Blue Fire at Quancheng Euro Park, which also lifts the name from Blue Fire. Another notable example is Steel Taipan at Dreamworld, which adds a swing launch system and a spiral rollback in addition to Blue Fire's original layout.

== Construction ==
Blue Fire opened as part of the first phase in a new Iceland-themed area of Europa-Park, which expanded the park's overall area from 70 to 85 hectares. Europa-Park's directors, Roland and Jürgen Mack, broke ground on the new Iceland area in June 2008. Europa-Park started posting teasers for Blue Fire on their website in July 2008. The teasers made reference to the coaster's acceleration, inversions, energy, and Iceland theme. In August 2008, the park released an animated teaser, again showing the Iceland theme, along with the train traversing part of the ride's layout.

Construction of Blue Fire's track commenced in early September 2008, and the park issued a press release about the new ride on September 18. The press release confirmed that the park was expanding by 15 hectares and gave further details about Blue Fire's launch system and trains. It also mentioned that Blue Fire had the tallest loop of any roller coaster in Europe at 32 metres, which Screamscape blogger Lance Hart pointed out was incorrect because the first loop on Dragon Khan at PortAventura Park reaches a height of 36 metres. The park has since clarified that Blue Fire's loop is the tallest on any launched coaster in Europe.

The builders of Blue Fire topped off the ride on October 1, 2008, and completed the track's layout in mid-December 2008.

The construction effort required that Europa-Park cut the Fjord-Rafting river rapids ride in half to allow construction workers to access Blue Fire's site. The removed part of Fjord-Rafting was restored as a tunnel section and reopened before the 2009 season.

== Trains and colour scheme ==
Blue Fire has five trains with five cars each. These cars accommodate two rows of two riders, for a total of 20 riders per train. However, the ride can only operate 4 trains on the circuit at any given time, with the 5th acting as a spare. With a two-minute, 20-second ride and separate loading and unloading stations, 1,450 riders can ride Blue Fire per hour. The trains use lap bar restraints rather than the over-the-shoulder restraints employed on Maverick and other Intamin Accelerator coasters, and stadium-style seating like that of Millennium Force. As opposed to more conventional lap bars found on most wooden roller coasters, the lap bar on a seat on Blue Fire is above the seat when the train is not occupied. However, the restraint itself rests in the rider's lap instead of across the rider's chest.

Blue Fire has blue track and light gray supports. The attraction's theming was designed by P&P Projects.

== Sponsorships ==
From 2010 to 2019, Blue Fire was sponsored by the Russian energy corporation Gazprom. The sponsorship saw the construction of the 1,300 square meter GAZPROM Theme World - The Wonder of Energy exhibition hall. For the 2020 season, the sponsorship was switched to Nord Stream 2, the then-ongoing extension of the existing Nord Stream 1 natural gas pipelines. The sponsorship was suspended when the Russian Federation invaded Ukraine on the morning of February 24, 2022, and the Nord Stream 2 project was cancelled by Chancellor Olaf Scholz. All references to the sponsorship were quickly removed online and the Nord Stream exhibition hall was simply renamed to "Blue Fire Dome".

== Height restriction ==
Europa-Park has set height and age restrictions for Blue Fire. No one under 1.30 metres (51 inches, 4 feet 3 inches) or 7 years of age may ride.

== Awards ==
Golden Ticket Awards: Top steel Roller Coasters
Year									1998	1999
Ranking									–	–
Year	2000	2001	2002	2003	2004	2005	2006	2007	2008	2009
Ranking	–	–	–	–	–	–	–	–	–	–
Year	2010	2011	2012	2013	2014	2015	2016	2017	2018	2019
Ranking	–	34	32	21	17	17	14	18	19	23 (tie)
Year	2020	2021	2022	2023	2024	2025	2026			
Ranking	N/A	30	33	39	34 (tie)	–	–			

== Gallery ==
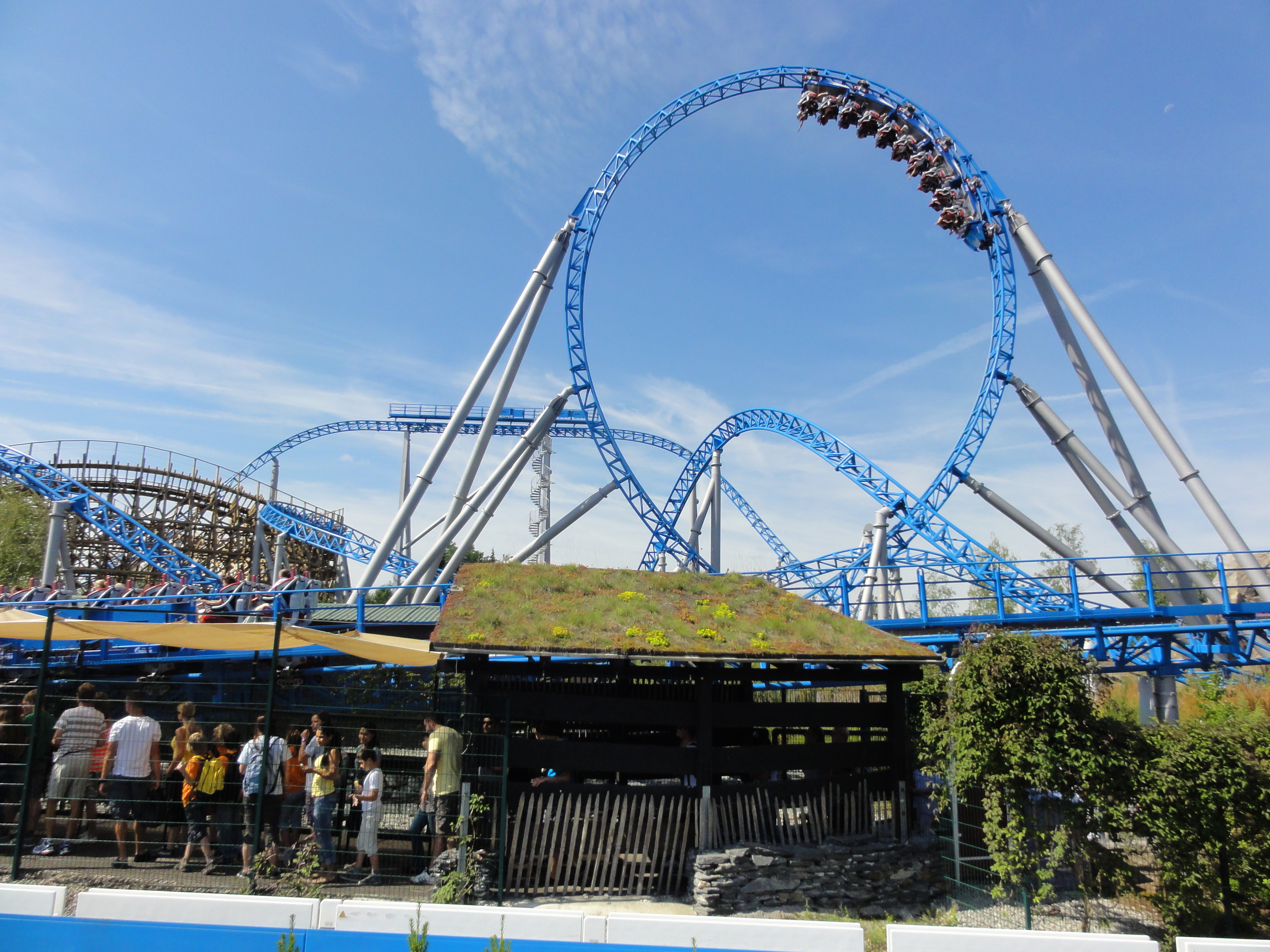
Train in vertical loop

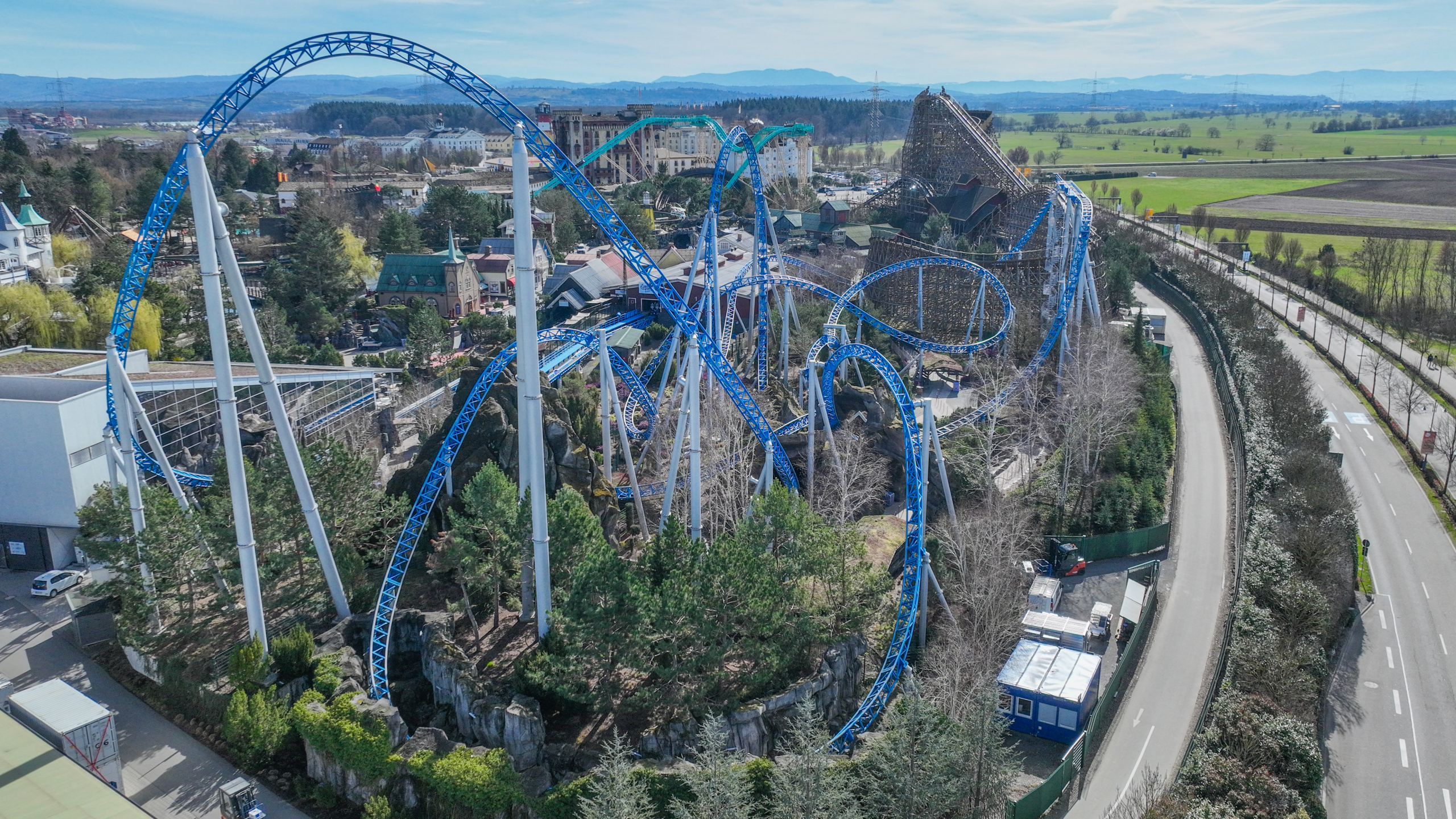
Track layout
