= Peter Valance =

German illusionist

Peter Valance (born June 4, 1980, in Riedlingen) is a German illusionist. He is the youngest recipient of the Merlin Award.

== Career ==
Valance was 15 years old, when he joined the Magic Circle. At 19 years, he became Germany's youngest professional magician. Valance produces up to 700 shows per year for cruise ships, casinos, theme parks, TV-productions and company events. In the last 5 years, more than 3 million people attended his shows.

In December 2012 he was part of the German TV-Show "Einfach Magisch", presented from Judith Rakers.

== Awards ==
- 2009: Merlin Awards: Best magic show

== TV shows ==
- 2012: Einfach Magisch (SF (24. November 2012, 20:10); ARD (17. Dezember 2012, 20:15 Uhr); BR (26. Dezember 2012)
- SAT1
- VOX "Deutschland sucht den Superstar - Das Magazin"
