= Franz Mack =

German entrepreneur (1921-2010)

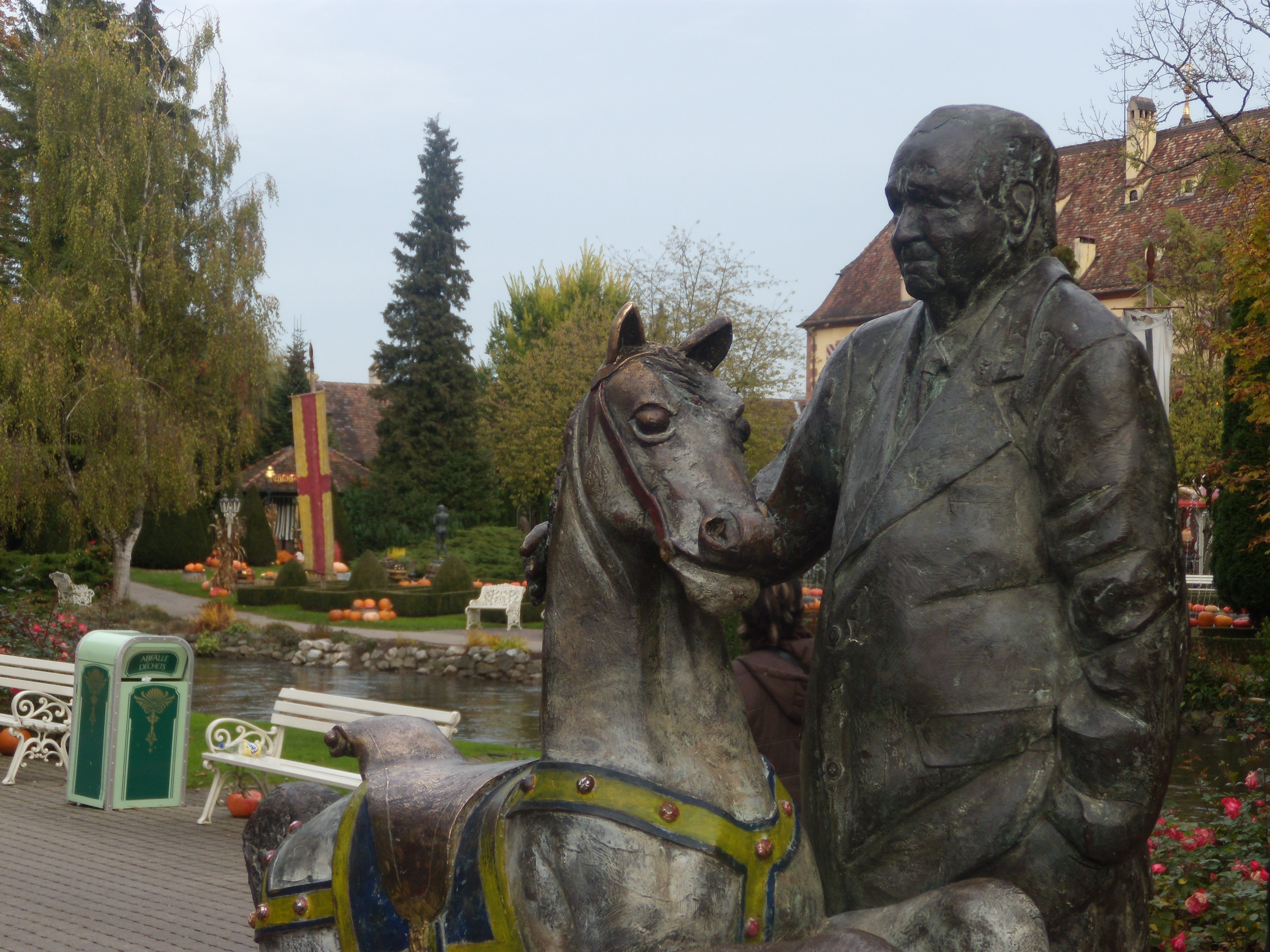
- Franz Mack statue in Europa-Park
- Born: March 7, 1921; Waldkirch, Baden-Württemberg, Weimar Republic
- Died: 3 October 2010 (aged 89); Rust, Baden-Württemberg, Germany
- Spouse: Liesel Mack
- Parents: Heinrich Mack (father); Theresia Mack (mother)
- Relatives: Roland Mack (son); Jürgen Mack (son); Michael Mack (grandson); Thomas Mack (grandson)

Franz Mack (7 March 1921 – 3 October 2010) was a German entrepreneur. He is the founder of Europa-Park.

== Personal life ==
Franz Mack was born in 1921 as the fourth son of Heinrich and Theresia Mack in Waldkirch, Weimar Republic. Franz Mack was married to Liesel Mack from 1948 until her death in 2004 and has two sons, Roland and Jürgen. He died in the night of October 3, 2010 in Rust at the age of 89.

== Career ==
After completing his compulsory education (Volksschule), Mack learned the profession of coachbuilding and later qualified as a certified master craftsman. At the age of 16, he started working as a design engineer in his parents' carriage and carousel factory in Waldkirch, Mack Rides, formerly known as Heinrich Mack GmbH & Co. KG. The origins of the factory date back to 1780.

His professional career was interrupted by the Second World War. Franz Mack spent several years as a prisoner of war. In August 1947, he and his brother fled from a camp in Alsace, France. After his father had hidden him for a year with a showman in the American Zone in Frankfurt, he returned to Germany. In Frankfurt, he returned to his native town of Waldkirch after the German currency reform in 1948.

In 1958, Mack and his brothers Hermann and Willi took over the carriage and carousel factory from his father.

=== Europa-Park ===
In July 1975, Mack opened Europa-Park with his son Roland. Originally, the purpose of the park was to showcase the products of the carousel factory. Mack developed several roller coasters, like Eurosat, built in 1989, as well as the high-speed roller coaster from 1997, Euro-Mir.

== Memberships and awards ==
Mack was a member of the DIN 4112 standards committee, responsible for the construction and operation of amusement rides. He also had a seat on the supervisory board of Volksbank Waldkirch and was involved in various honorary offices.

Mack received the following awards:

- 1984: Order of Merit of the Federal Republic of Germany (Bundesverdientkreuz).
- 1991: Lorenz Werthmann Medal of Caritas.
- 1997: Grand Cross 1st class (Order of Merit of the Federal Republic of Germany).
- 2001: Honorary Citizen of the Municipality of Rust.
- 2006: Medal of Merit in Gold of the town of Waldkirch.
- 2006: Hall of Fame of the IAAPA.
