= Kuraoka =

Kuraoka is a surname. Notable people with the surname include:

- David Kuraoka (born 1946), American ceramic artist
- Rubina Kuraoka (born 1987), Japanese German voice actress

== See also ==
- Kuraoka Shrine
