= Miriam Mack =

German model and entrepreneur (born 1982)

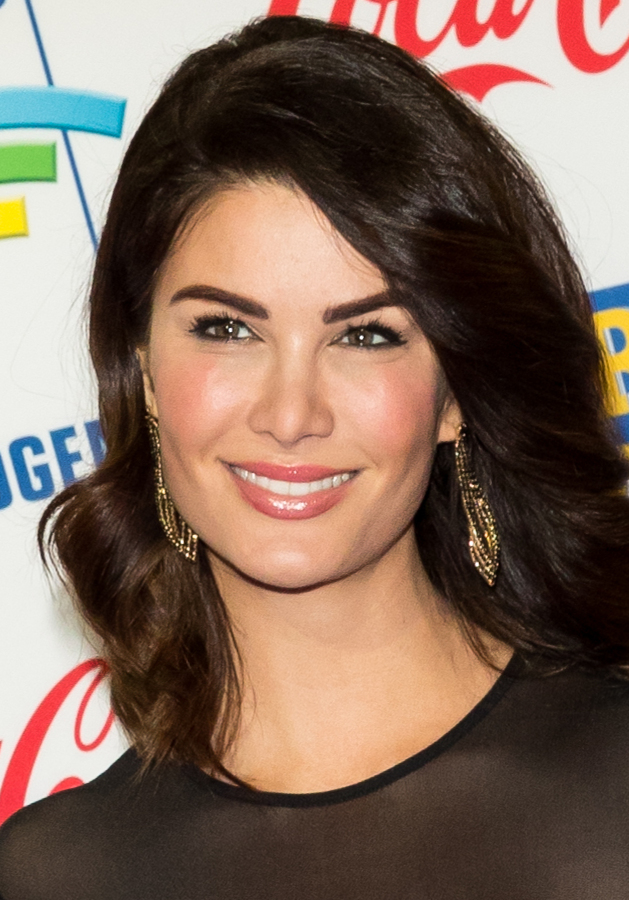
- Miriam Mack 2018
- Born: July 27, 1982 (age 43); Stuttgart, Germany
- Organization: Europapark Rust
- Spouse: Michael Mack

Miriam Mack (born 27 July 1982) is a German model and entrepreneur.

== Personal life ==
Mack grew up in Stuttgart as the daughter of Croatian immigrants in Germany.

In 2008, she met Michael Mack, son of Europa-Park founder Roland Mack and a member of the amusement park's management board. The couple married in May 2010 and have two sons.

Mack is an ambassador for the German Children's Fund and, since 2024, has served as the Honorary Consul of Croatia in Baden-Württemberg, with an office in Freiburg.

== Career ==
Mack began her career as a banking clerk at Landesbank Baden-Württemberg between 1999 and 2002. She then moved to Milan for two years and worked as an international photo model from 2003 to 2010. In addition to her modeling work, Mack also appeared in the German television series Verbotene Liebe (Forbidden Love).

Since 2010, Mack has been working within the Mack Group. She initially worked at the main cash desk and, in 2017, took over the management of corporate health for Europa-Park employees. Mack also completed a distance learning program to become a holistic health consultant and earned a degree in health economics.

In 2024, the FeelGood health centre, founded by Mack, was opened in Rust.

Also in 2024, Mack published a Croatian cookbook. The same year, she released the series Eine Reise durch Kroatien (A Journey Through Croatia) on Veejoy, Europa-Park's streaming platform. In this miniseries, Mack travels through various regions of Croatia.

In 2025, Miriam and her husband Michael Mack received the Večernjakova Domovnica Award (Croatian Homeland award), presented by the Croatian newspaper Večernji list, for opening a Croatia-themed area in Europa-Park. In the same year, her FeelGood health centre won a Brass ring award, presented by the IAAPA, as best wellness centre in an amusement park.

== Publications ==
- Mack, Miriam. 2024. Kroatien: meine Rezepte und Geschichten von der adriatischen Küste [Croatia: my recipes and stories from the Adriatic coast]. Hölker. Münster. ISBN 978-3-7567-1038-6.
