= Grand Prix of Europe (film) =

2025 animated sports comedy film

- Theatrical release poster
- Directed by: Waldemar Fast
- Written by: Kirstie Falkous; Jeffrey Hylton; John T. Reynolds; Ben Alexander Safier
- Produced by: Michael Mack
- Starring: Hannes Maurer; Maria Koschny; Rubina Nath; Hans Bayer; Jan Delay
- Edited by: Björn Teubner
- Music by: Volker Bertelmann
- Production companies: Mack Magic; Warner Bros. Film Productions Germany
- Distributed by: Warner Bros. Pictures
- Release dates: 17 July 2025 (Pula Film Festival); 24 July 2025 (Germany)
- Running time: 98 minutes
- Country: Germany
- Languages: German; English
- Box office: $15.8 million

Grand Prix of Europe is a 2025 German animated sports comedy film, created to celebrate the 50th anniversary of the German theme park Europa-Park, and starring the park's mascots Ed Euromaus and Edda Euromausi. The film features the voices of Hannes Maurer, Maria Koschny, Rubina Nath, Hans Bayer and Jan Delay.

Grand Prix of Europe was released in Germany on 24 July 2025, by Warner Bros. Pictures.

== Plot ==
Edda is a young female mouse with a talent for racing who works at her family amusement park on the outskirts of Paris and dreams of racing in the Grand Prix of Europe. Her particular hero is racing legend Ed, a male mouse who has won the Grand Prix four times. However, following her mother's death, the park is struggling, and her father, a retired Grand Prix champion, has taken loans from shady characters who will possess the park if the loans are not repaid in a week. In an attempt to raise money, Edda heads to Paris for the initial race of the Grand Prix, handing out fliers advertising her family's amusement park to the crowds. However, she finds herself backstage and happens to come across Ed's racing car, and cannot resist the urge to drive it. Ed catches her in the act and leaps onto the car, just as it speeds through the streets of Paris. Edda crashes the car in a mound of dirt, injuring Ed's shoulder. Since injury would mean disqualification, a frustrated Ed ultimately agrees to Edda's plan, in which she secretly takes his place, in return for half the winnings to allow her father to pay off the park's loans. Ed disguises Edda as a superfan who has won a contest to accompany him to the Grand Prix.

Edda drives in the initial Paris race, with Ed telling her what to do through a two-way earpiece. Edda is sabotaged as an unknown opponent coats her wheels in grease mid-race, causing her to spin out. She manages to recover and finish 30th, barely avoiding elimination. Ed refuses to believe that Edda was sabotaged, believing that she lacks the skills and experience to compete at such a high level like himself. In the second race in the alps, Edda once again notices sabotage as some of the snowball obstacles start chasing after racers, though she avoids them and finishes 10th. Edda is convinced that Nachtkraab, an crow racer, is behind the sabotage, but Ed refuses to believe her. In the third race in Italy, Edda is in contention to win alongside Nachtkraab and Magnus, a friendly bear racer, when a blast of wind from one of the two knocks her off the course and spoils her chance of victory. After the race, she begins to search Nachtkraab's car in the hopes of exposing him, but she is caught tampering with his car and is penalised with a 1-minute starting penalty in the final race. Having recovered from his injury, Ed fires Edda. Edda discovers that Magnus, resentful about the fact that he always comes in second, is the one performing the sabotages, and that he has created a fleet of magnetic drones to sabotage the final race in London. She also learns from Böckli, a goat racer who knew Ed when he was young, and as an orphan, he learned he couldn't rely on anyone else to help him.

Edda tries to warn Ed about the sabotage as he prepares to race in the finals, but he does not listen. As the race starts, her father and friends from the amusement park arrive. As Edda explains to them what has been happening, she realises Magnus’ drones have travelled into the sewers to interfere with the racers. She takes her father's vehicle and pursues. Edda finally convinces Ed of what is going on after she disables a drone that was attempting to spin out his car, and Edda dispatches most of the drones to allow Ed to recover and overtake the other cars to take the lead. An angry Magnus sees Edda on his dashboard and orders the drones to levitate an underground train. As Ed is approaching the finish line, he sees Edda being pursued; he decides that saving her is more important than victory, and turns the car around just before crossing the line, managing to land his car onto the train and stopping it before it can crash into a crowd of spectators.

Magnus wins the race and is awarded the trophy, but Ed and Edda expose his sabotage, causing his disqualification and arrest by the police. Nachtkraab, who finished second, is awarded the trophy instead. However, he passes it on to Edda, having been long aware that she was substituting for Ed as he had recognized her distinctive driving style as being similar to her father's. Ultimately, Edda's father uses the winnings to pay off his loans, while Edda forms a racing partnership with Ed and Böckli.

== Voice cast ==
=== Original German cast ===
- Hannes Maurer as Ed, a racing legend and Edda's idol
- Maria Koschny as Edda, a teenage mouse and daughter of fairgrounds operator Erwin
- Rubina Nath as Cindy, a red fox who is the retired champion and mastermind behind the Grand Prix of Europe
- Hans Bayer as Erwin, the fairgrounds operator and Edda´s father
- Jan Delay as Enzo, a red-and-green macaw who is the commentator for the Grand Prix of Europe
- Tom Vogt as Nachtkraab, a crow racer
- Leonhard Mahlich as Magnus, a grizzly bear racer
- Kevin Kraus as Richard, a lion racer
- DJ BoBo as Böckli, a Swiss mountain goat racer

=== English dub cast ===
- Thomas Brodie-Sangster as Ed
- Gemma Arterton as Edda
- Hayley Atwell as Cindy
- Lenny Henry as Erwin
- Rob Beckett as Enzo
- Colin McFarlane as Nachtkraab
- David Menkin as Magnus
- Adam El Hagar as Richard

== Production ==
The film was announced in July 2024 to coincide with the 50th anniversary of the German theme park Europa-Park in 2025. Waldemar Fast directed the film from a script by Kirstie Falkous, Jeffrey Hylton and John T. Reynolds. Producer Michael Mack stated that the film will be "the first in a family-friendly franchise". The film was executive-produced by Tobias Mundinger and Lars Goldenbogen.

== Release ==
=== Theatrical ===
Viva Pictures distributed the film in the United States and Canada, under their Viva Kids label. The film had its world premiere at the Pula Film Festival on 17 July 2025. The film was released in the United Kingdom on August 22 by Kazoo Films. In the United States, it was released on November 7, after being previously scheduled to be released on August 29, and August 22.

=== Video game ===
Serving as a tie-in to the film, Ed & Edda: Grand Prix – Racing Champions was released on Microsoft Windows, Nintendo Switch, PlayStation 5 and Xbox Series X/S. The game was released alongside the film's release date in Germany, which is July 24, 2025.

=== Attraction ===
At the start of the 2025 theme park season Europa Park, prior to the film's summer 2025 release, opened the tie in interactive attraction called Grand Prix EDventure.

== Reception ==
The Guardian's Cath Clarke gave Grand Prix of Europe 3 out of 5 stars, praising the voice acting, but opining that "the film wins no prizes for originality".
