= Jürgen Mack =

German entrepreneur (born 1958)

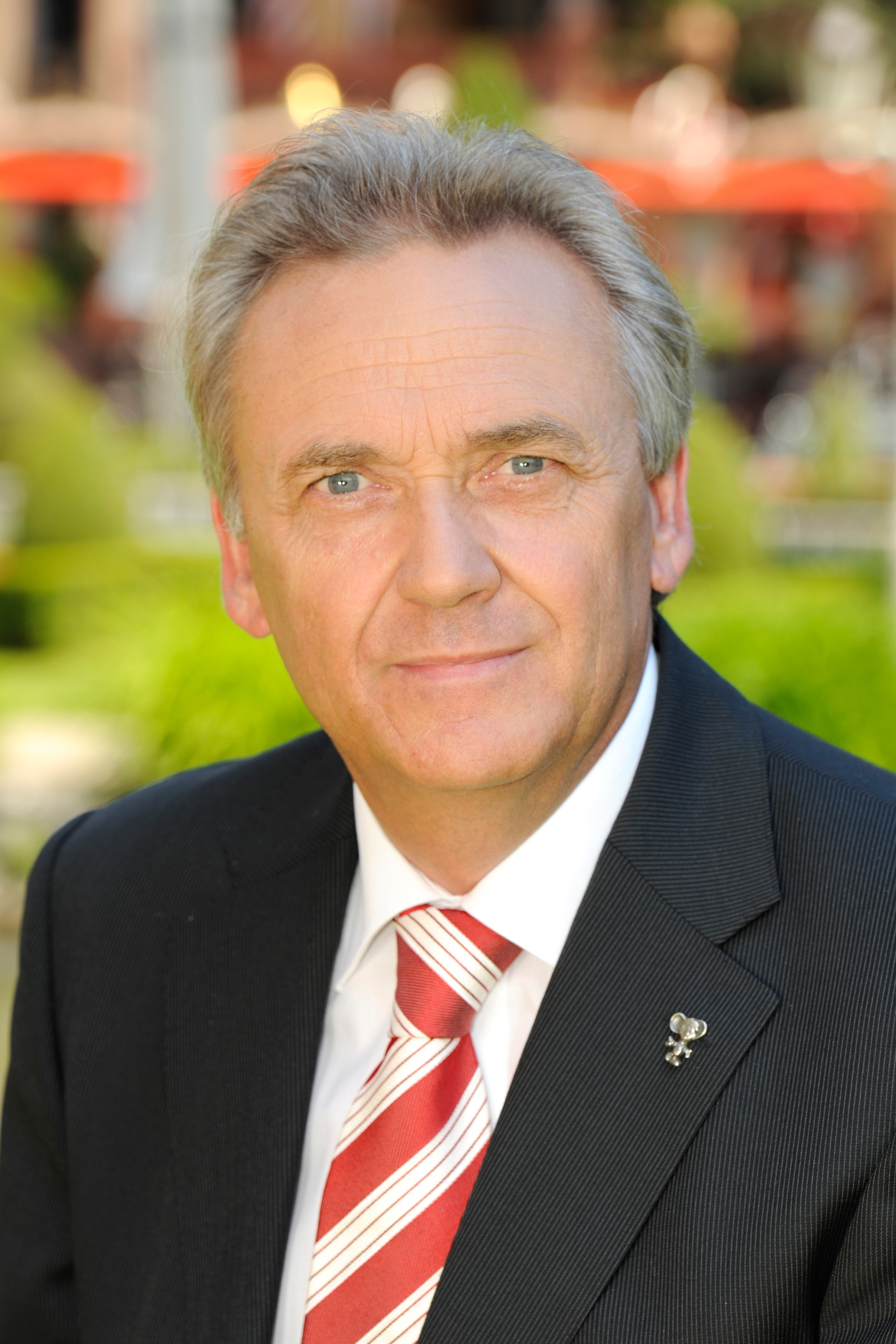
- Mack in 2016
- Born: June 3, 1958 (age 67); Freiburg im Breisgau, West Germany
- Occupation: businessman
- Organization(s): Europapark Rust, Mack Rides
- Spouse: Mauritia Mack
- Children: 2
- Parents: Franz Mack (father); Liesel Mack (mother)
- Relatives: Roland Mack (brother); Michael Mack (nephew); Thomas Mack (nephew)

Jürgen Mack (born June 3, 1958) is a German businessman. He is part of the Mack Family, which owns and runs the German theme park Europa-Park.

== Early life ==
Jürgen Mack was born as the second son of Liesel and Franz Mack. He grew up together with his older brother Roland Mack in Waldkirch.

He studied at the University of Karlsruhe from 1978 to 1986, graduating with a degree in mechanical engineering. After graduating, Mack completed additional training as a welding engineer as well as internships at amusement parks in the USA.

== Career ==
He joined his father's company, Europa-Park, in 1987 and became a managing partner alongside his father Franz and his brother Roland. Jürgen Mack is mainly in charge of the park's personnel, finances and controlling. Jürgen Mack is also partnered with Mack Rides in Waldkirch, which manufactures most of the amusement rides for Europa-Park.

== Personal life ==
Jürgen Mack is married to German architect Mauritia Mack. They have two children.

Together with his wife, Mack is involved in charitable associations and projects such as the Kinderschutzbund (German Association for the Protection of Children).

He was also involved in the social project We help Africa for the World Cup 2010 in South Africa, where he acted as city sponsor for the city of Karlsruhe. As a sponsor, Mack supported the Nordic World Junior Ski Championships in 2010 and the annual skiing Grand Prix in Hinterzarten.

== Recognition ==
- 2005: Order of Merit of the Federal Republic of Germany (Bundesverdientkreuz).
- 2008: Lorenz Werthmann Medal of Caritas for his social commitment.
- 2011: Honorary citizen of Sélestat.
- 2015: Medal of Honour of the Municipality of Rust.
- 2022: Chevalier dans l’ordre des Palmes académiques.
