= Eatrenalin =

Theme park ride and restaurant at Europa Park, Germany

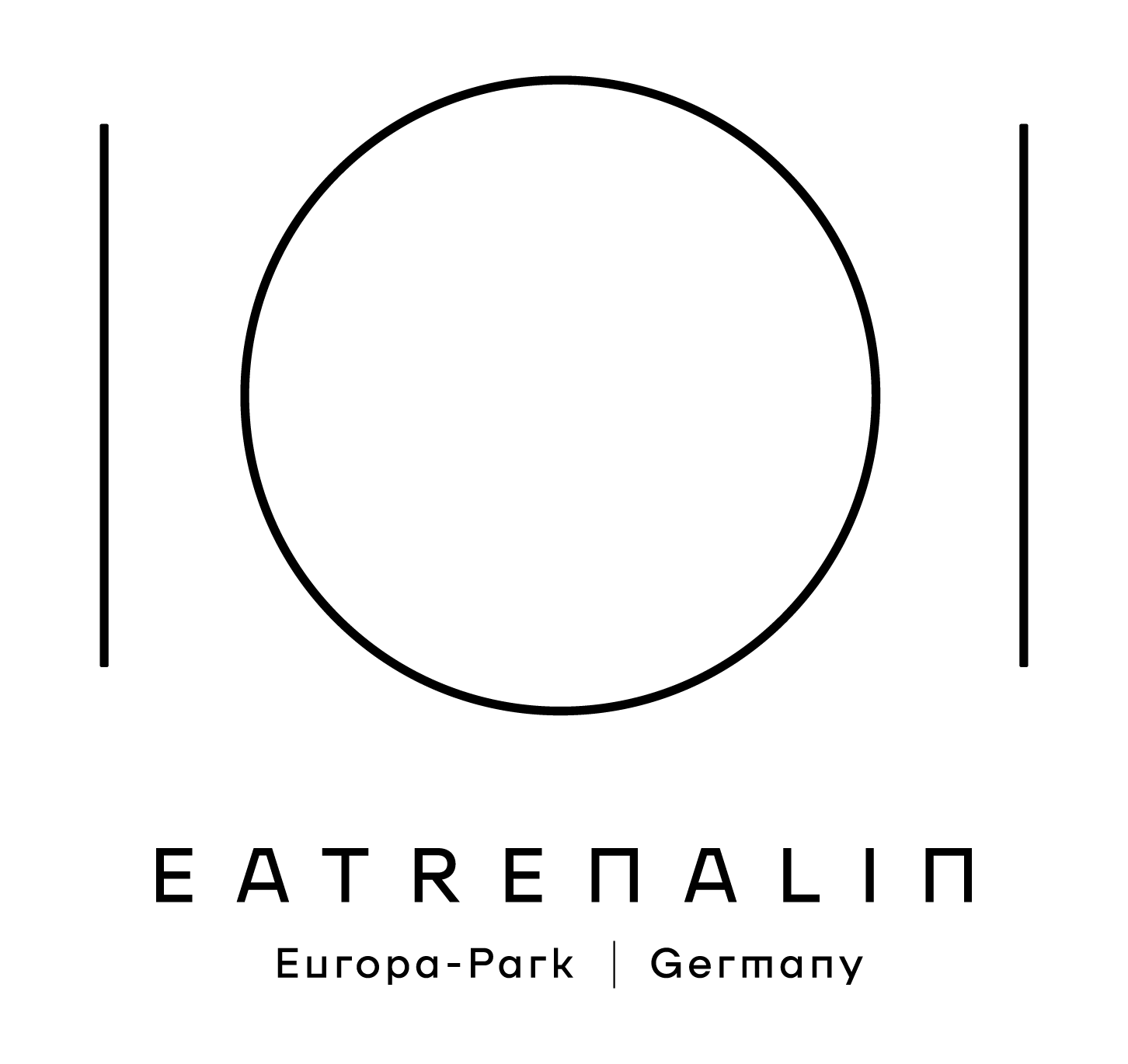

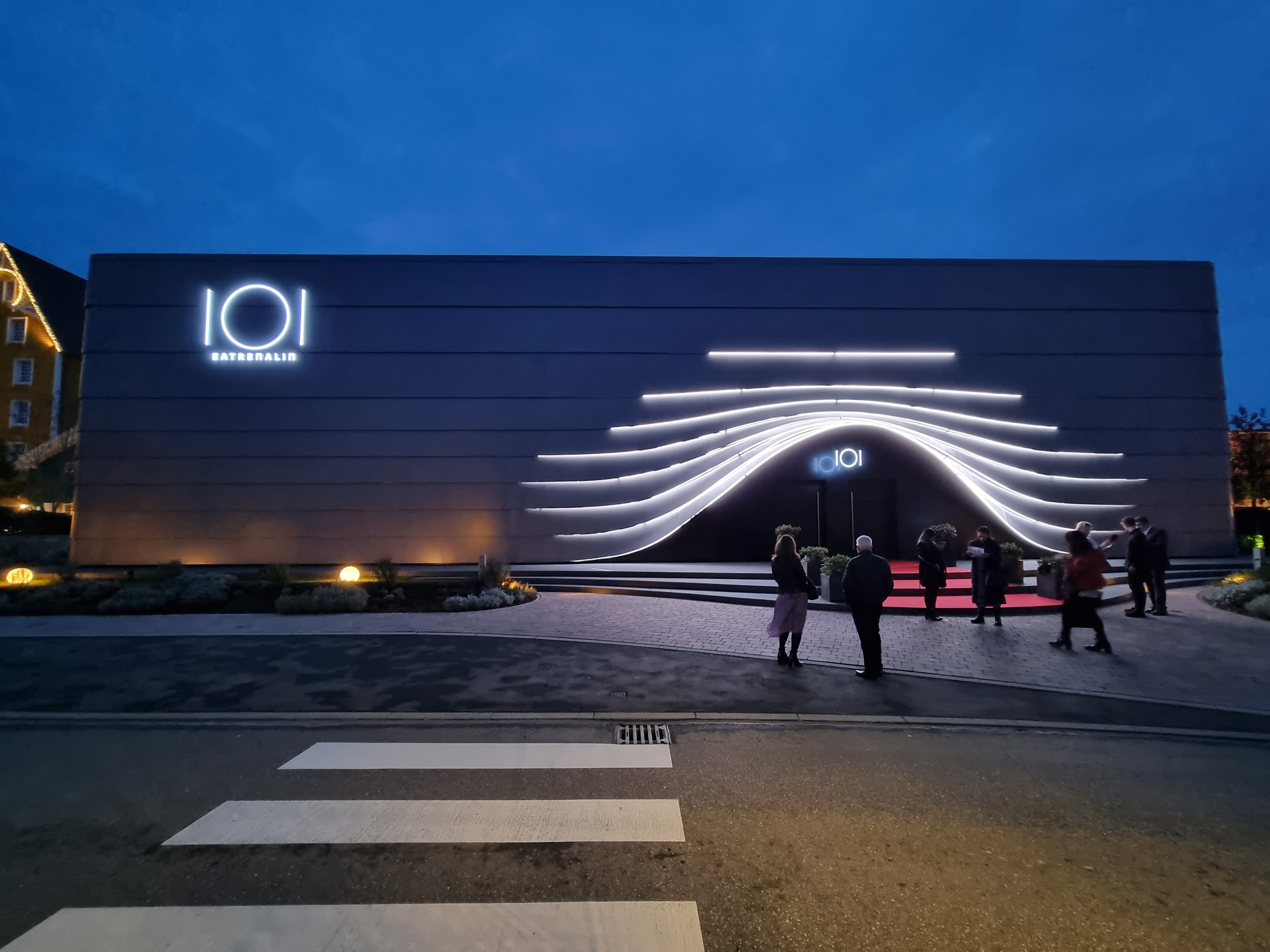
- Exterior of Show Building at night

Europa Park
- Coordinates: 48.261°N 7.7379°E
- Status: Operating
- Opening date: 4 November 2022

Rulantica

Ride statistics
- Attraction type: Trackless Dark Ride
- Manufacturer: Mack Rides
- Designer: Thomas Mack
- Height: 0 m (0 ft)
- Drop: 0 m (0 ft)
- Capacity: 32 riders per hour
- Riders per vehicle: 1
- Participants per group: 16
- Duration: 120 minutes
- Rating: (Michelin Guide)
- This is a pay-per-use attraction
- Wheelchair accessible

Eatrenalin is an attraction combining a themed dining experience and trackless dark ride located at Europa Park in Rust, Germany, which opened on 4 November 2022. The name is a portmanteau of "eat" and "adrenaline".

Peter Hagen-Wiest has been the head chef since May 2025.

== History ==
Eatrenalin was created by Thomas Mack, managing partner of Europa-Park, and Oliver Altherr, CEO of Marché International. The concept was inspired by a visit to the Voletarium flying theater in Europa Park, where visitors virtually fly over several European countries experiencing various sensory stimuli (sight, smell, hearing and touch). The two wanted to create a ride that focused instead on the sense of taste.

Initially scheduled to open in the fall of 2021, the opening was postponed due to the COVID-19 pandemic and took place on 4 November 2022.

On 22 September 2026, at the IAAPA trade show in the UK, Mack Rides announced a new version of the ride technology, EatX, to be opened in 2027 at Karl's Adventure Village outside Berlin. Called Erdbeer Speisereise, this will take family diners on a journey through the development of the modern strawberry.

== Experience ==
Guests are seated in ride vehicles (referred to in the ride as "floating chairs") and are transported through eleven themed rooms, all connected by a vague storyline. Each room experience lasts approximately 15 to 20 minutes.

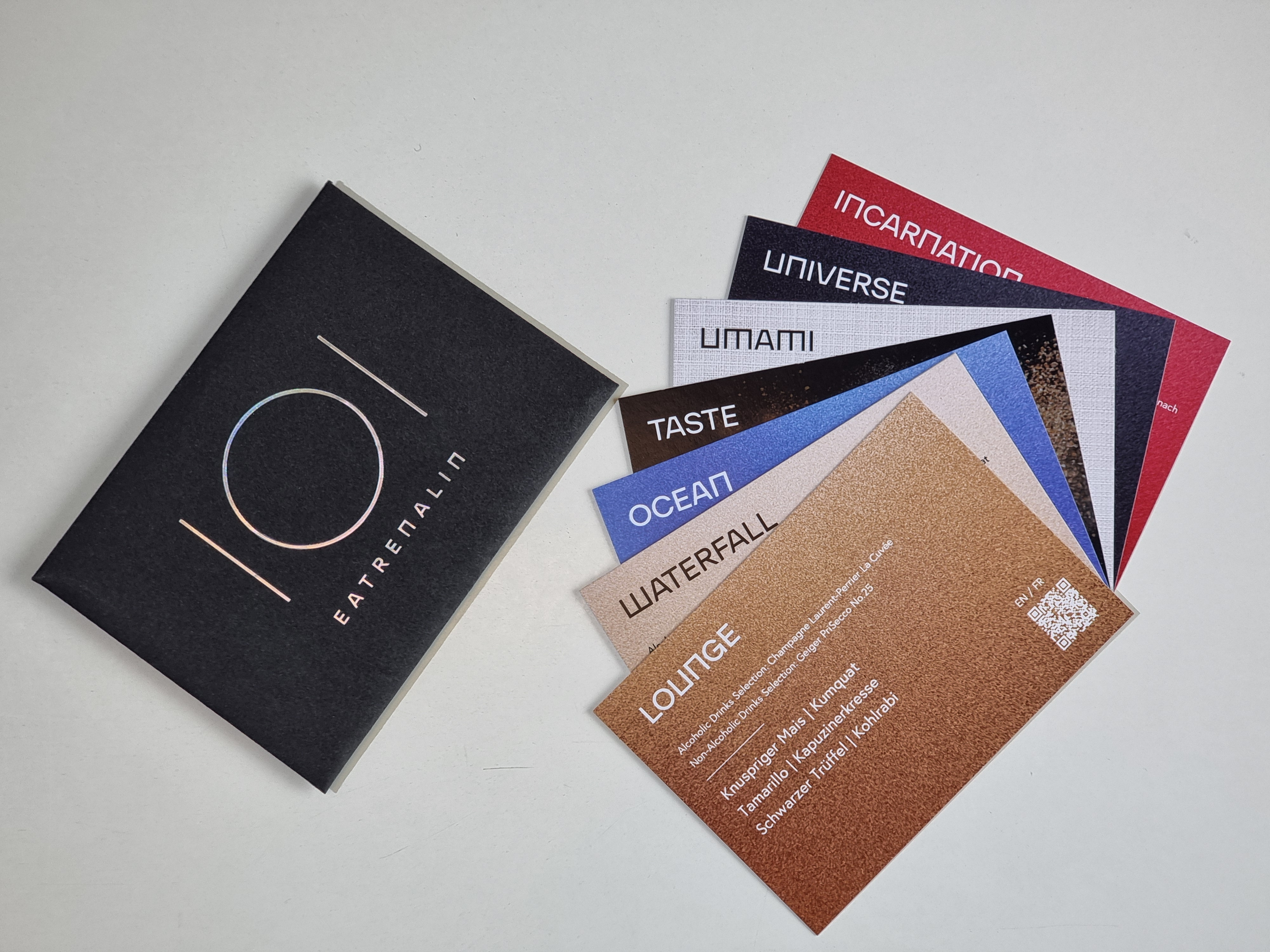
Menu cards given to guests during the experience

Lounge – guests are greeted with hors d'oeuvres and an aperitif.

Waterfall – in front of a virtual waterfall, guests are introduced to the concept and an AI character, Lena, who will design the perfect menu for everyone.

Discovery – guests are batched into two groups (left and right) and seated in the floating chairs. They are served a palate cleanser.

Ocean – a seafood course served beside a beach scene where the sun is slowly setting. The chairs gently move around the room.

Taste – in a room with a backdrop of hundreds of spice bottles, guests are introduced to four of the basic tastes: sweet, sour, bitter and salty, enhanced with visuals, movement, sound and scents.

Umami – guests move to a Japanese themed room overlooking rice fields where they experience the flavour of umami. This is the last room where guests are permitted to take photographs or video.

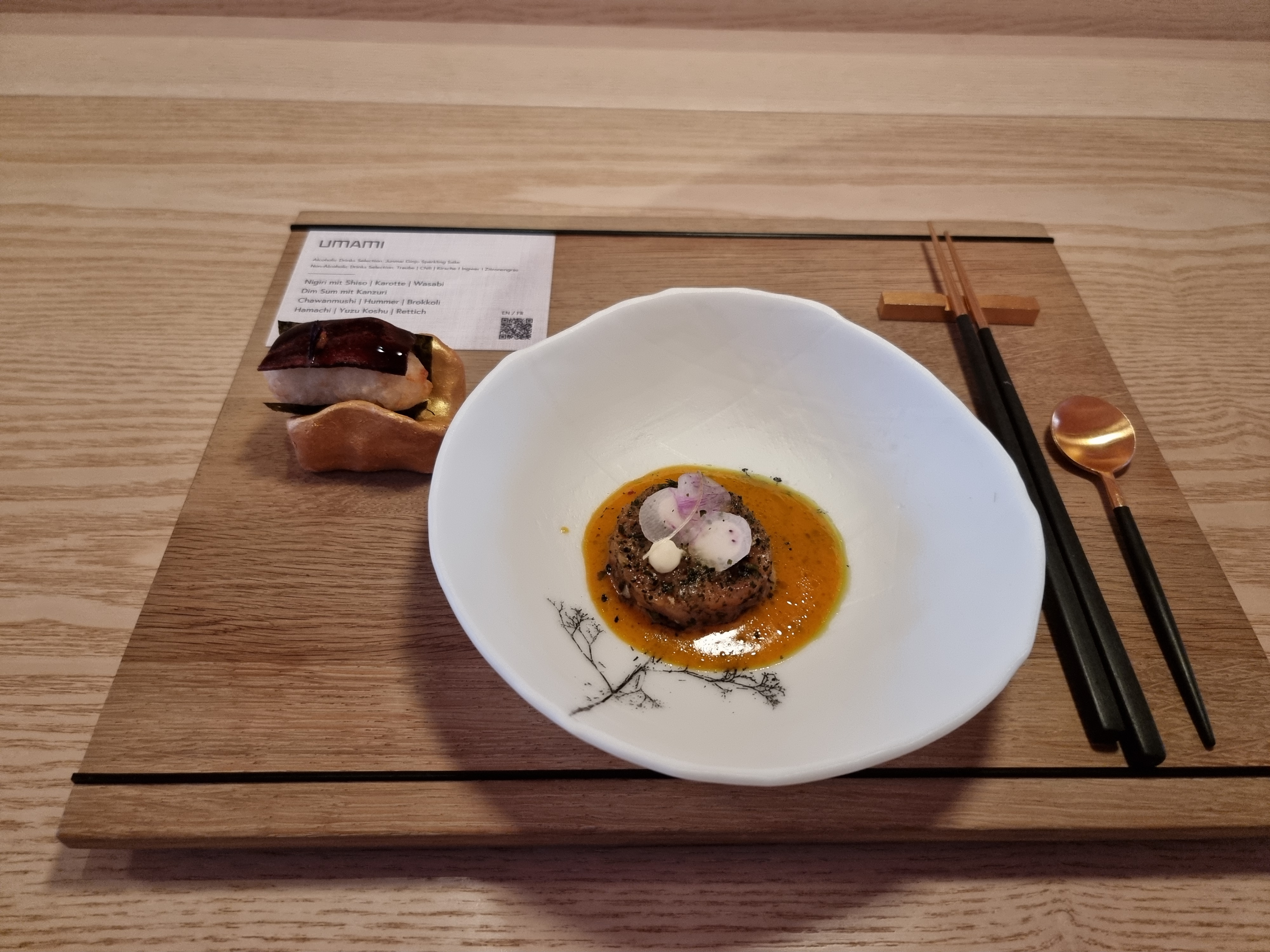
Dish served in the Umami room (note most meals are served at tables in the various rooms rather than on the ride vehicle itself)

Spaceship – Lena pilots the guests into space, avoiding a solar flare. This room features sound, movement and physical effects.

Universe – the main course is served in space, surrounded by the planets.

Incarnation – Lena becomes human, and walks through the guests, giving one of them a rose. Dessert is served.

Elevator – guests are taken back to Earth in a space elevator.

Bar – having left their floating chairs, guests are free to walk around, chat and enjoy a digestif.

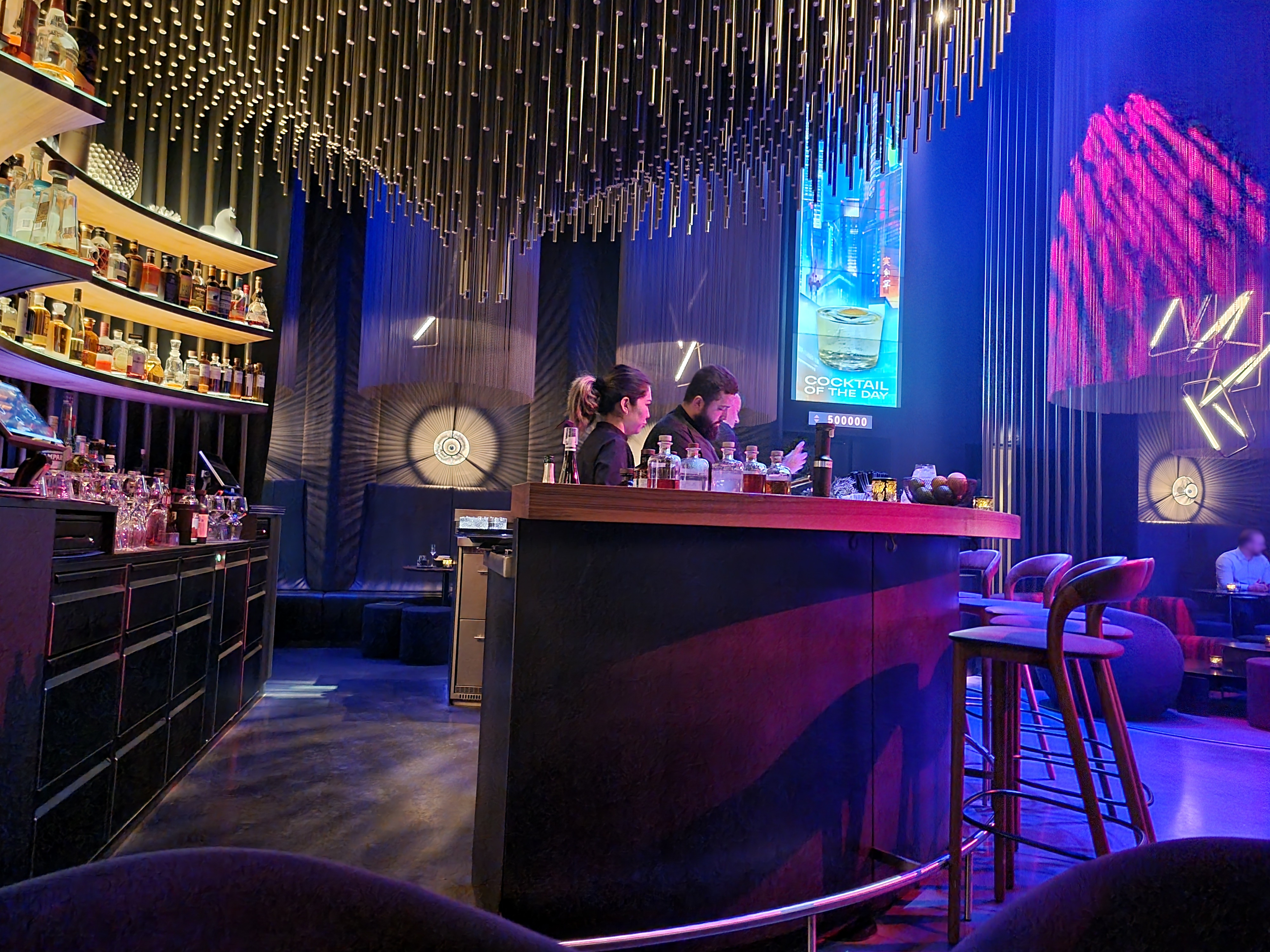
The bar where riders/guests end the experience.

== Capacity ==
Initially, up to 12 groups could be served each evening, meaning the capacity was 192 people per evening. In 2023, the timing was staggered, and therefore the number was reduced to 10 groups (160 people) per evening. The floating chairs form a group of four in most of the rooms.

== Theming and effects ==
Each room is individually themed, matching the respective course of the menu. The music was produced in collaboration with DJ Rafael Becker from Dubai, composer Hendrik Schwarzer, and Jan Lepold (T-Rex Classics). The rooms feature projection mapping, lighting, video screens, practical effects, human performers, scents, movement and sound.

== Language ==
When booking, guests have the choice between French and German (with some English) as the main language of the experience, with English available on request for group bookings. Eatrenalin states that language comprehension is not a requirement for the experience.

== Safety and accessibility ==
In conventional dark rides guests are restrained in the vehicle for their own safety, but in Eatrenalin this is not feasible. As a result, guests are asked to stay in their floating chairs in most areas of the ride. Children under 10, pets and service animals are not permitted. The building is wheelchair accessible.

== Ride vehicle ==
The floating chair's movable platform features two small tables and a small storage area. According to the manufacturer, the vehicle consists of a total of 2,078 components and weighs 320 kilograms (710 lb). Movement is smooth and almost silent. Guests have no control over the chairs themselves.

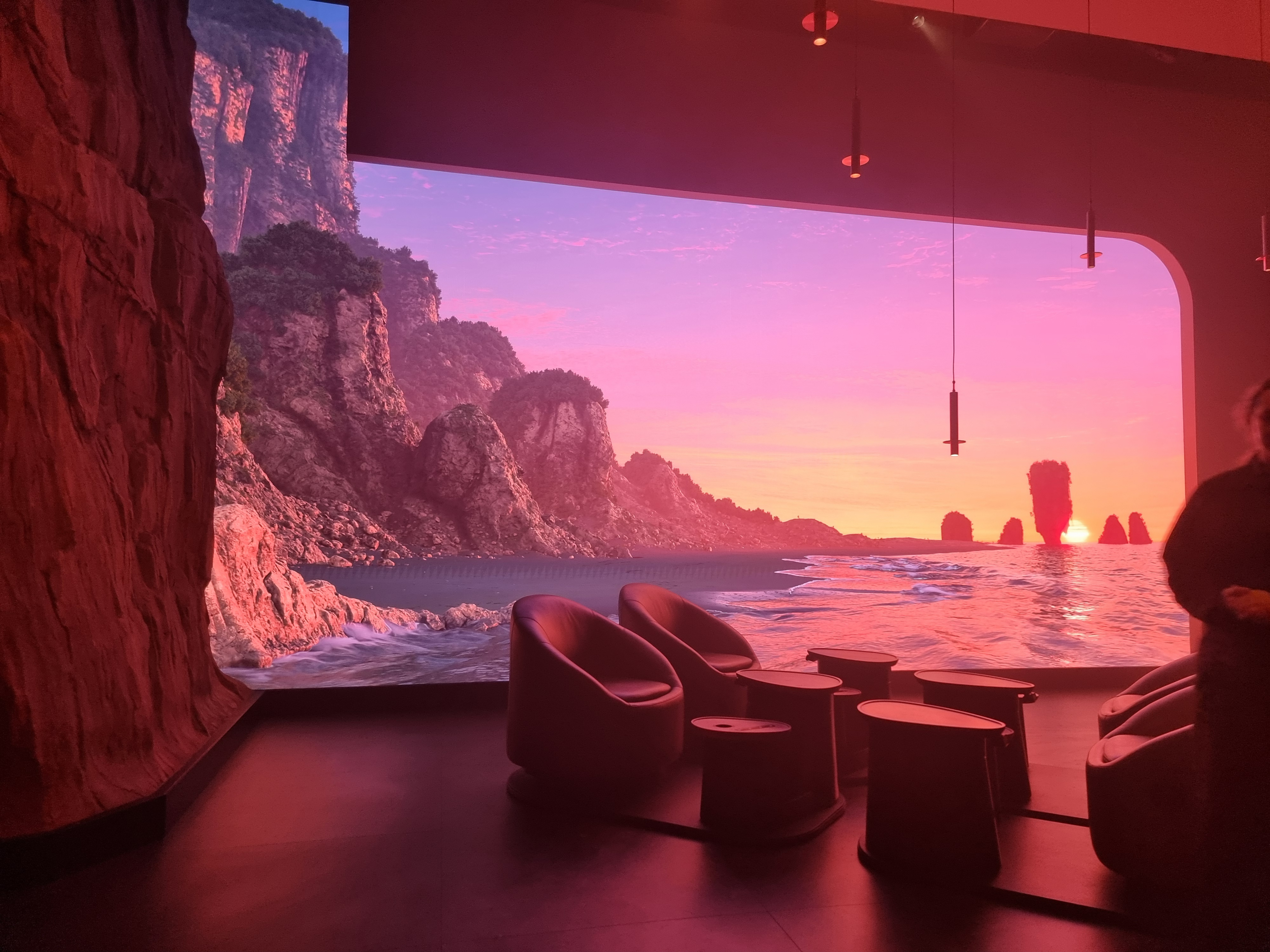
The Ocean room, showing the individual trackless vehicles on which riders/guests are transported through the ride

== Menu and cuisine ==
The menu consists of eight courses. A new menu is offered approximately twice a year (called "seasons") to offer variety to returning guests. There is a choice between the Green (vegetarian) and Red Dimension menus. Guests can also choose between wine or non alcoholic drink pairings when the experience is booked.

== Reception ==
Due to its novel concept, Eatrenalin received international media coverage.

The Michelin Guide lists Eatrenalin as one of the twelve most unique restaurants in the world and describes it as "futuristic." Gault-Millau speaks of a "fantastic journey" and acknowledges the influence of Hangar 7 on the menu. On 23 June 2026, Michelin Guide awarded the restaurant its first Michelin Star.

Other reviewers found the concept exciting but noted the high cost of the experience.

== Awards ==
2023: Golden Ticket "Best New Innovation" award

2024: THEA Award in the “Experimental Dining Attraction” category

2023: Blooloop Innovation Awards in the “Blue Sky - Out of the box concepts” category

2024: Travellers' Choice Award (Tripadvisor)

2026: Michelin Guide Michelin Star
