= Thomas Mack (restaurateur) =

German restaurateur and hotelier (born 1981)

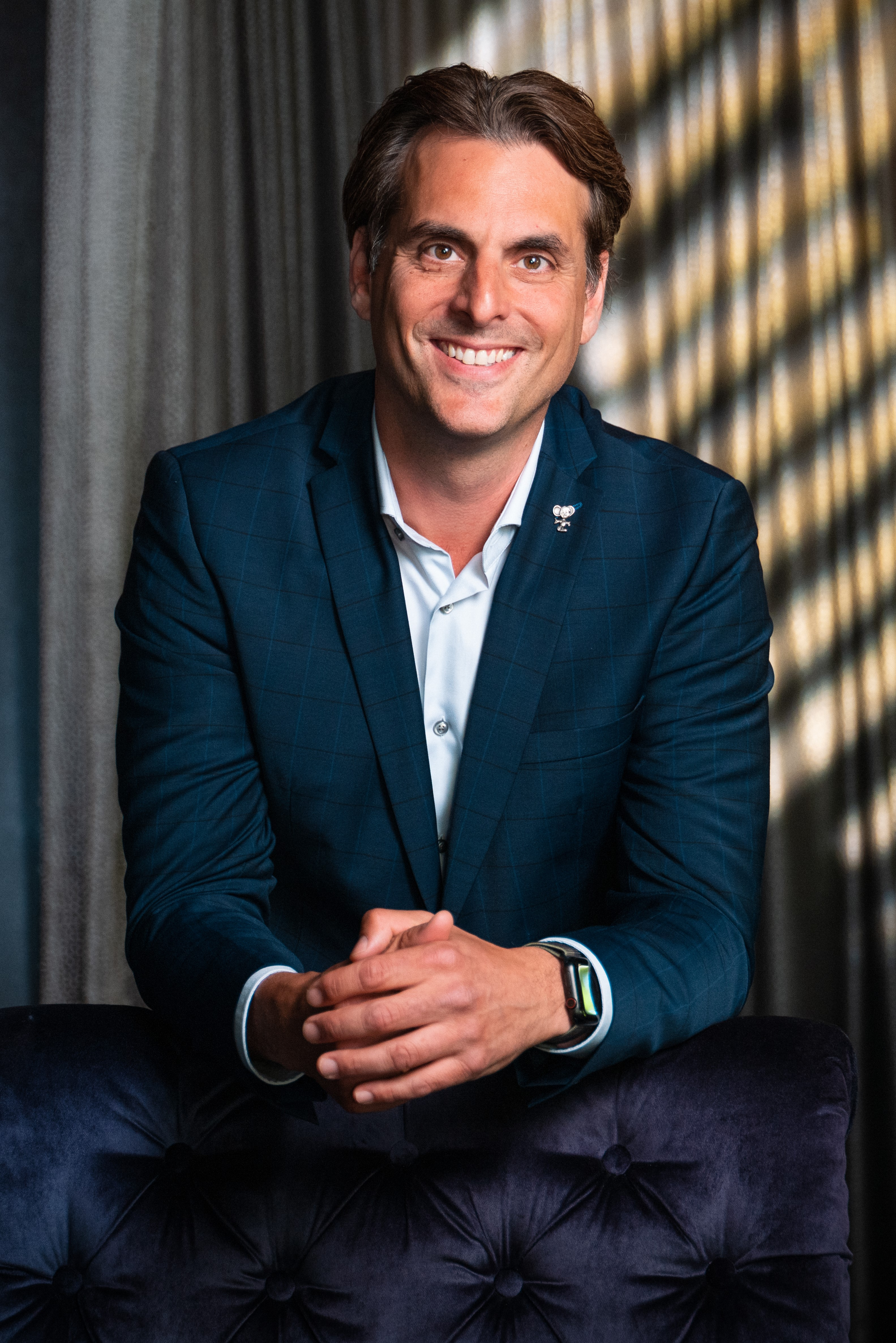
- Thomas Mack in 2023
- Born: January 4, 1981 (age 45); Lahr, West Germany
- Education: Diploma in Hotelier
- Organization: Europapark Rust
- Spouse: Katja Mack
- Parents: Roland Mack (father); Marianne Mack (mother)
- Relatives: Michael Mack (brother); Ann-Kathrin Mack (sister); Jürgen Mack (uncle)
- Awards: Hotelier of the Year 2020

Thomas Mack (born January 4, 1981, in Lahr) is a German restaurateur and hotelier of the largest hotel resort in Germany.

== Career ==
As the son of Roland Mack, Thomas Mack joined Europa-Park in Rust as an authorized officer in 2007. He is responsible for the hotels, gastronomy and entertainment at Europa-Park. The first major project at Europa-Park, which Mack played a key role in, was the four-star hotel Bell Rock. The two-star luxury restaurant Ammolite - The Lighthouse Restaurant (head chef Peter Hagen-Wiest) and the four-star Hotel Krønasår with 1300 beds were also created under Mack's responsibility. He is also responsible for the development of the adjacent Rulantica water park, which opened in 2019. In 2021, the German publication Handelszeitung reported that Mack was planning a new event catering concept with Eatrenalin, in which food and virtual media were to be combined. The first Eatrenalin restaurant opened in Rust on November 4, 2022.

== Personal life ==
Thomas Mack was born the second son of Roland Mack and Marianne Mack. He has an older brother, Michael Mack, and a younger sister, Ann-Kathrin Mack. They grew up at Europa-Park. Mack attended elementary school in Rust and passed his Abitur at Ettenheim High School. From 2001 to 2006 he studied at the hotel management school in Lucerne. He completed his studies as a certified hotelier.

Mack has been married since 2013 and has two children with his wife.

== Awards ==
The Allgemeine Hotel- und Gastronomie-Zeitung published by the dfv media group named Mack “Hotelier of the Year” in 2020. Mack was named "Successful Restaurateur of the Year" at the "Fizzz Awards 2020".
