= Rulantica =

Water park in Baden-Württemberg, Germany

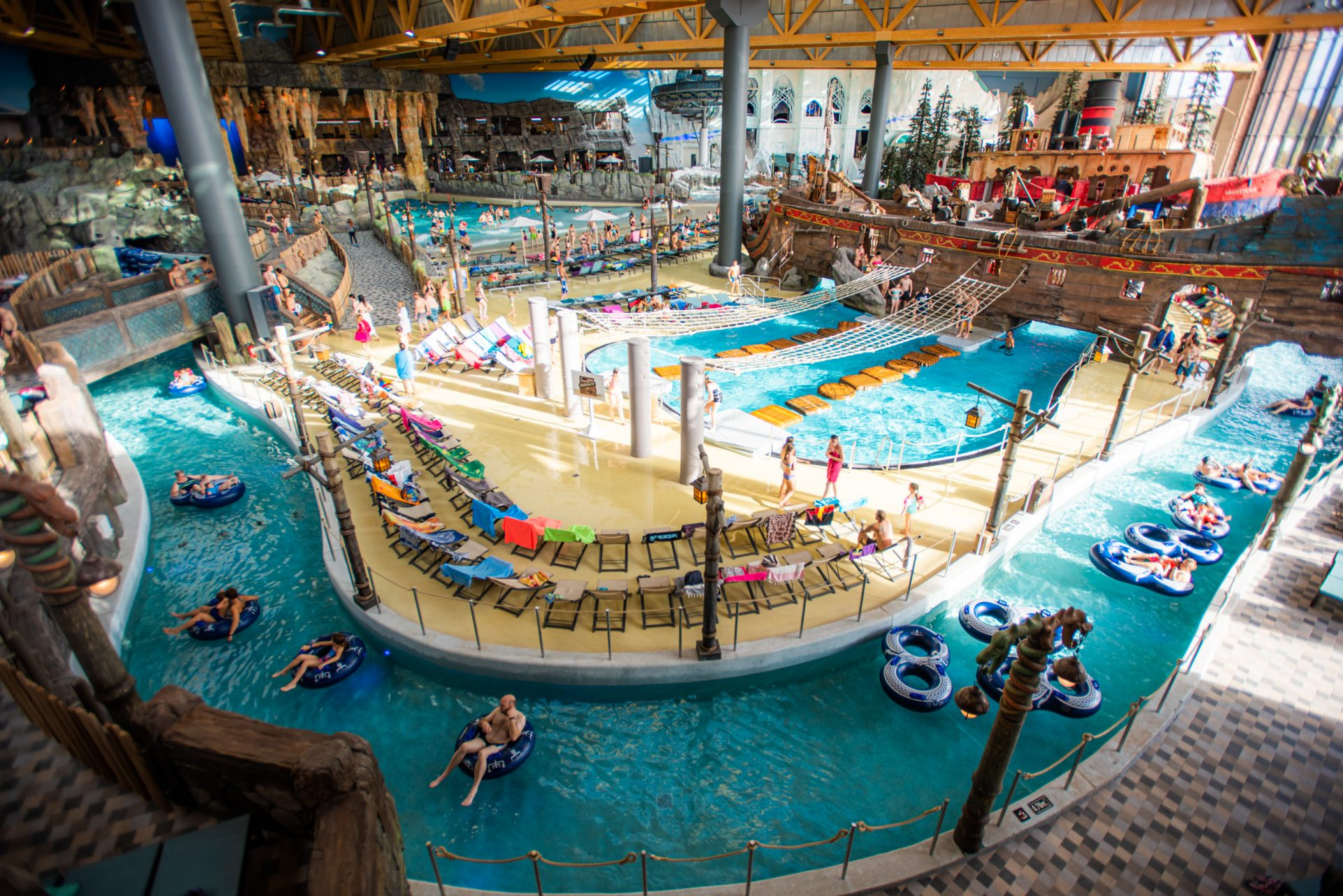
- Interactive map of Rulantica
- Location: Rust, Germany
- Coordinates: 48°15′38″N 07°44′24″E
- Owner: Europa-Park GmbH & Co Mack KG
- Opened: 28 November 2019
- Operating season: Year-round
- Visitors per annum: 1,200,000 (2023)
- Area: 450,000 m^{2} (4,800,000 sq ft)
- Water slides: 31 water slides
- Website: rulantica.de

Rulantica is a water park in Rust, Baden-Württemberg. The name sets the theme of a fictional Norwegian Sea island. The park is operated by Europa-Park GmbH & Co Mack KG, and owned by the Mack family. It was opened to the public in November 2019. The Rulantica site has a total area of 450,000 m^{2} (4,800,000 sq ft), and a maximum capacity of 6,000 visitors per day.

== Location and site ==
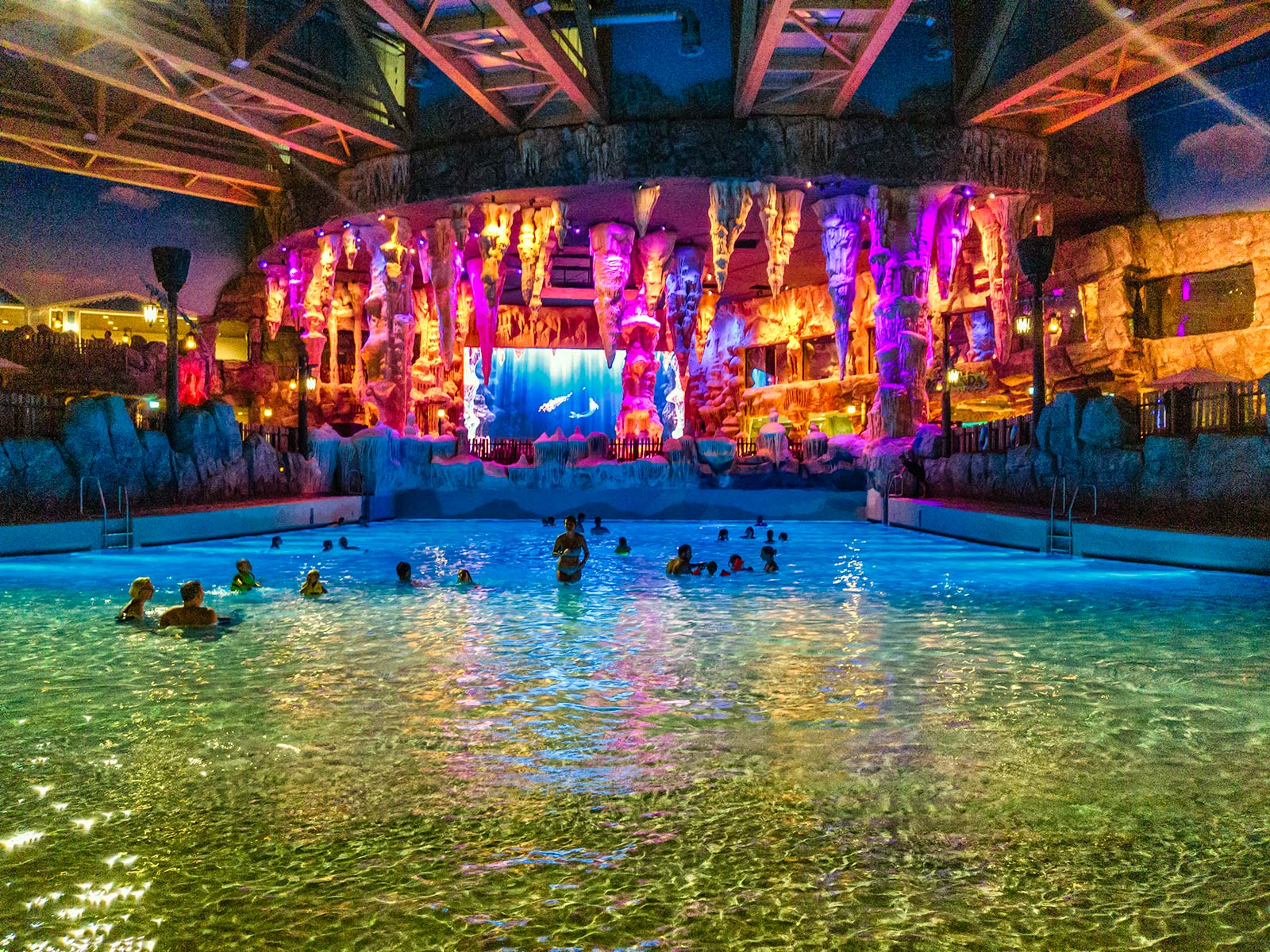
Rulantica wave pool

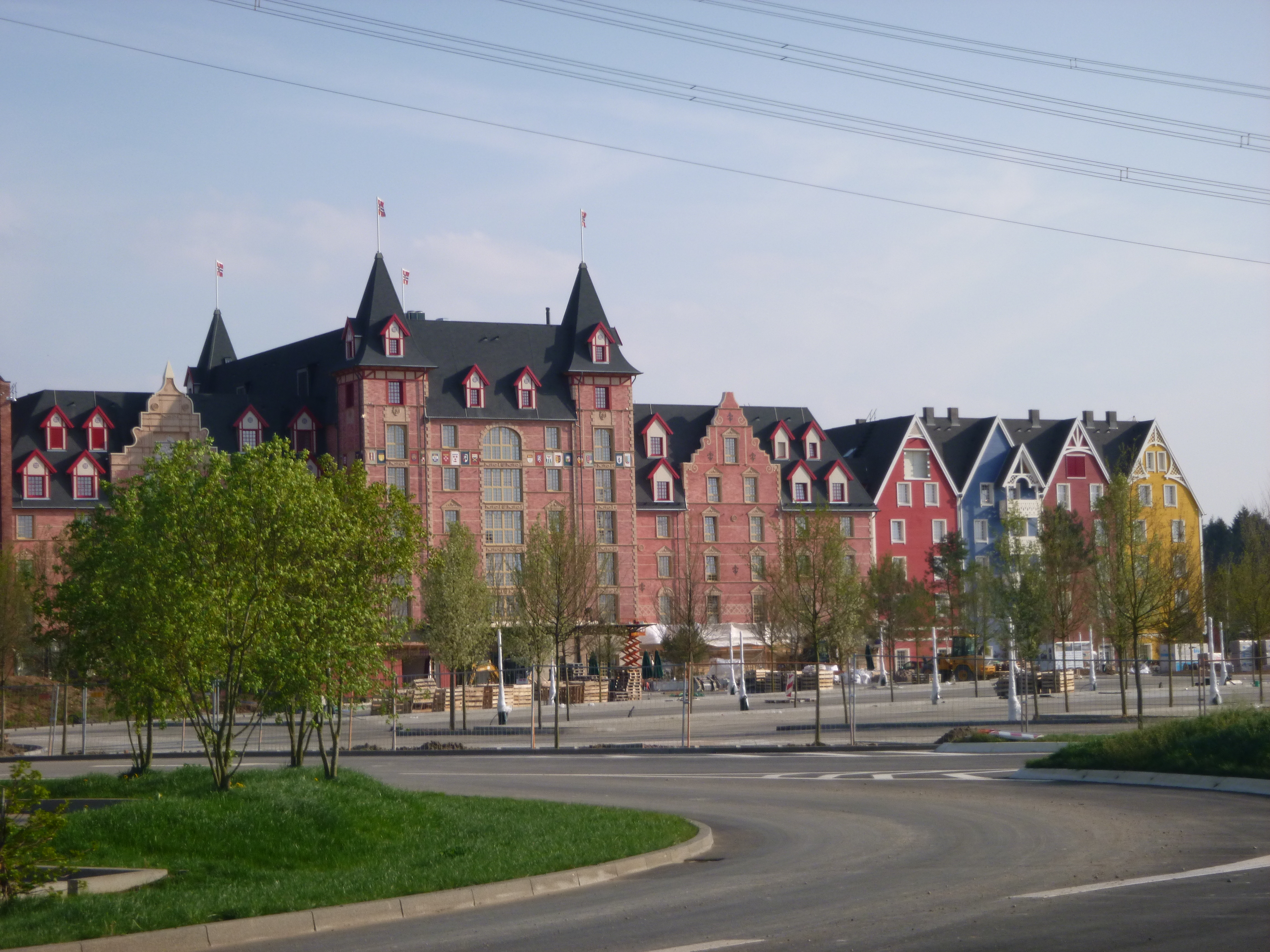
Krønasår hotel

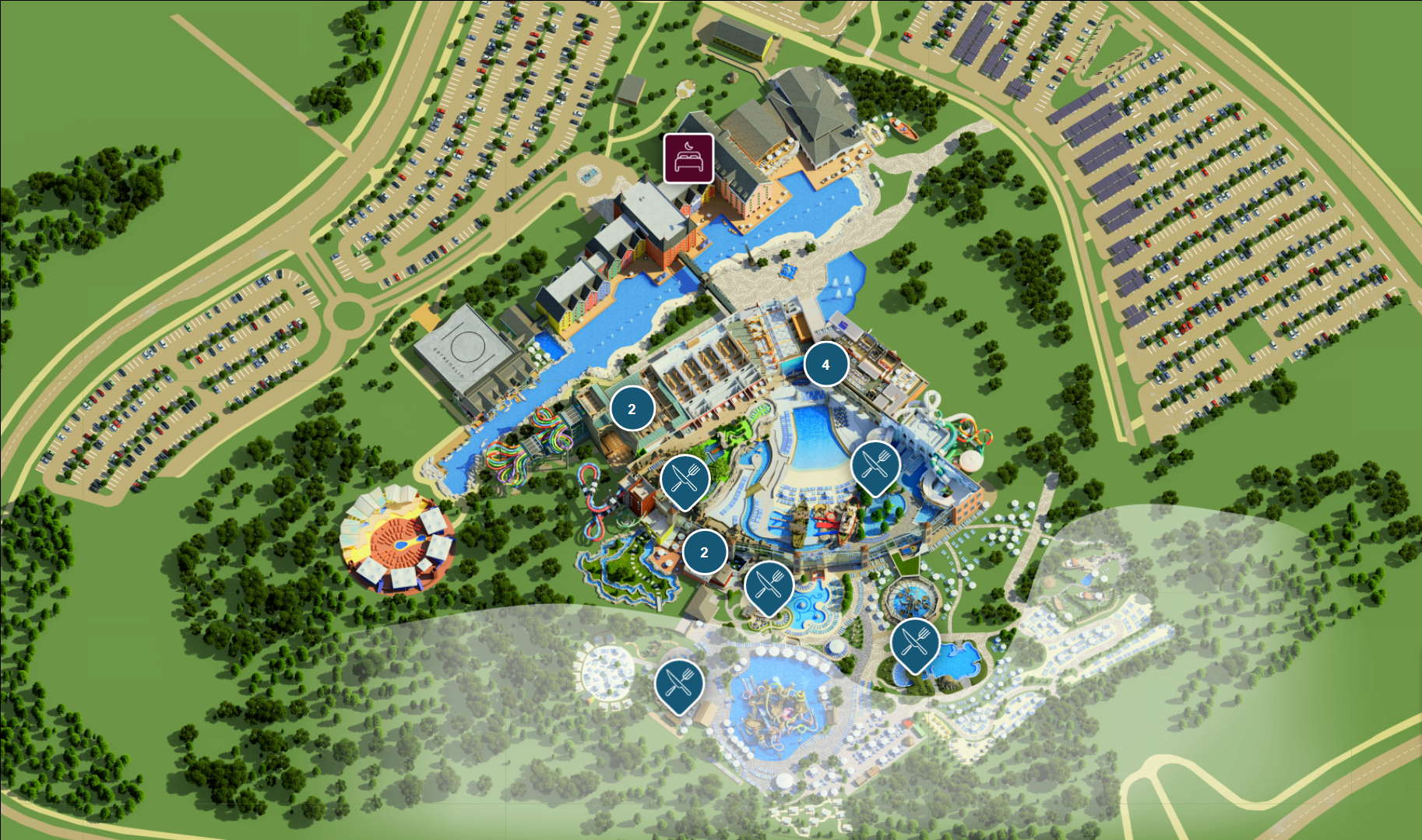

The Rulantica site is located in the east of Rust, Baden-Württemberg, about 30 km (19 mi) north of Freiburg im Breisgau and 28 km (17 mi) south-east of Offenburg, in close proximity to the Europa-Park. Its total area is 45 hm^{2} (110 acres), of which about 15 hm^{2} (37 acres) are developed. Rulantica contains car parks, the Krønasår hotel, the Hyggedal sauna and relax area, and the actual water park. The latter has 13 themed areas with a total square footage of 40,000 m^{2} (430,000 sq ft), of which more than 32,600 m^{2} (351,000 sq ft) are indoors. The water park comprises a hall with a height of 20 metres (66 ft) and a roof surface of 10,500 m^{2} (113,000 sq ft) that houses the park's indoor attractions. The hall bears resemblance to a hand-held fan or shell. According to Badische Zeitung, the total construction cost was then said to be about EUR 150 million, and has one of the largest wooden roof structures in Europe. The pylon that supports the wooden roof structure is made of spruce wood and has a mass of 50 t. Rulantica has a total indoor volume of 300,000 m^{3} (11,000,000 cu ft). About 25 per cent of the electric energy needed for Rulantica is generated with solar cells installed in the car parks as shadowing. The water required for Rulantica is taken from purpose-built wells. 2000 new trees were planted in the process of constructing Rulantica. Rulantica has about 550 employees, of which 300 work in the water park, and 250 in the Krønasår hotel.

== Themes ==
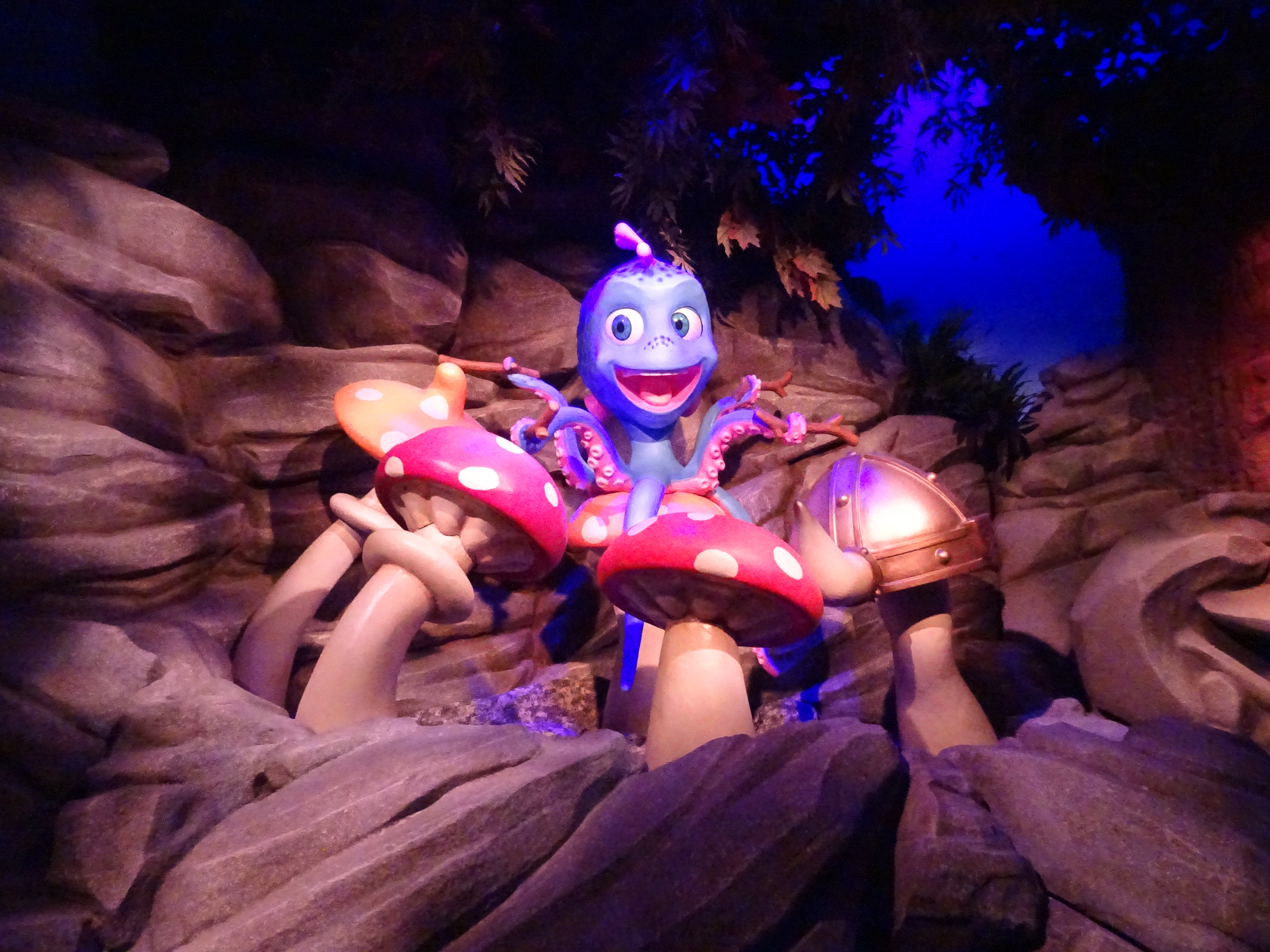
Snorri is Rulantica's mascot.

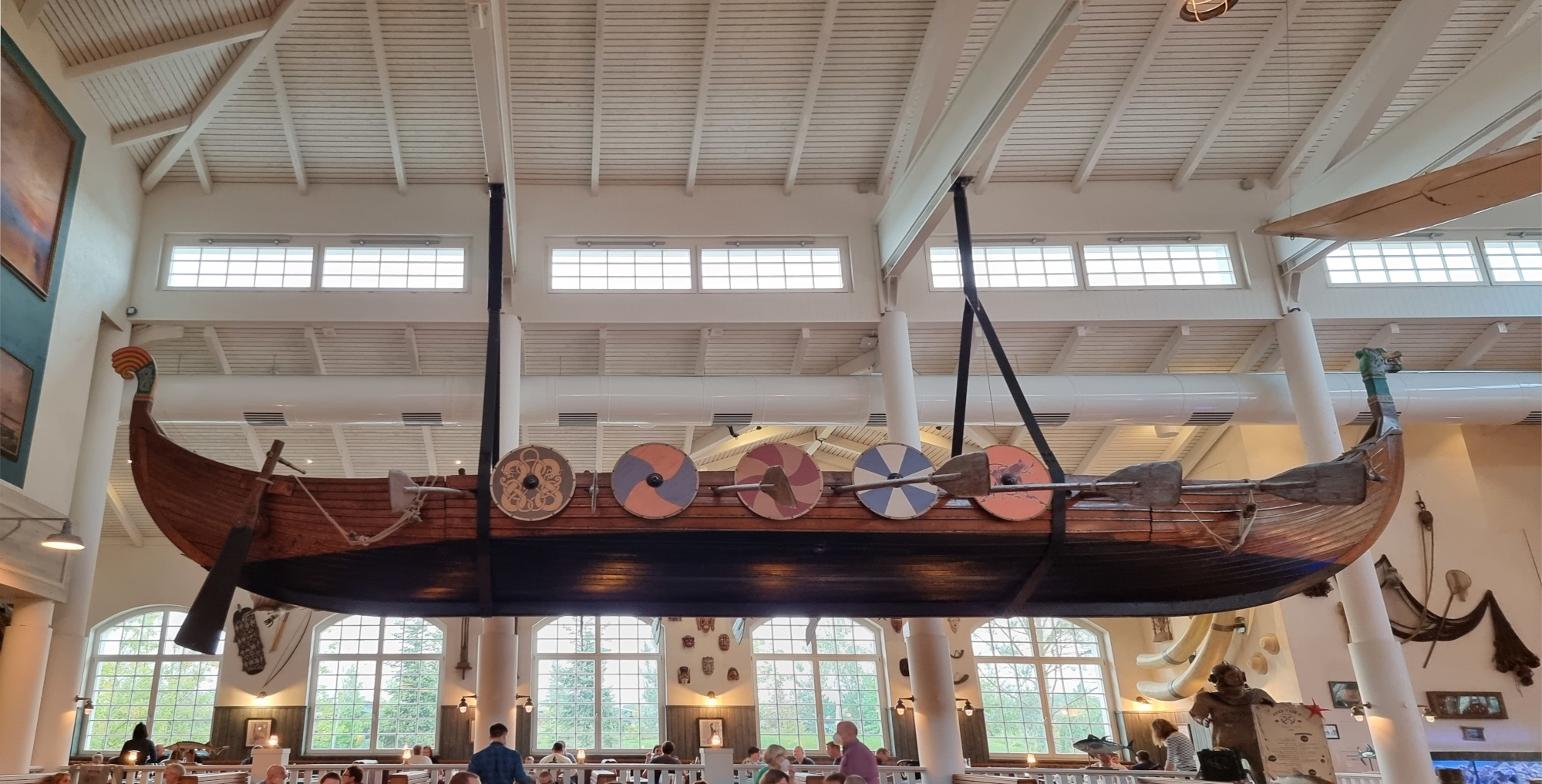
The Wiking Saga on static display at the Bubba Svens restaurant in Krønasår

Rulantica has a Scandinavian theme throughout all its dedicated areas and attractions. The Krønasår hotel is modelled on a museum of natural history that features various exhibits based on fictional Rulantica characters, but also non-fictional exhibits like the Wiking Saga that was used by Burghard Pieske to cross the Atlantic. The mascot of Rulantica is a blue, six-limbed cephalopod called Snorri. He was first unveiled in late 2017.

== History ==
The earliest Ideas for Rulantica date back to 1996. The planning phase for the project began in 2012. In April 2014, the Rulantica brand was registered by Europa-Park GmbH & Co Mack KG. Back then, German magazine Parkerlebnis speculated that Rulantica could be an addition to Europa-Park, likely an entertainment show or a relax ride. The Rulantica name was created by Manfred Gotta and is an acronym composed of Rust and Atlantic. On 8 July 2014, Europa-Park GmbH & Co Mack KG announced that Rulantica would be a water park. Like Europa-Park, Rulantica was planned with differently themed areas, and the planned visitor capacity was up to 5000 indoors and 3000 outdoors. The total construction time was calculated with 18 to 25 months; the budget was EUR 140 million. In October 2014 Parkerlebnis reported that Rulantica would be smaller than originally announced. The opening was expected for the first half of 2017.

Eventually, the Rulantica project was approved in March 2016, and construction of the Krønasår hotel bagan in May 2016. The construction for the actual water park began on 14 September 2017. According to Badische Zeitung, the total construction cost was then said to be about EUR 150 million, which made Rulantica the most expensive investment in the history of Europa-Park, and the biggest privately financed construction site in Baden-Württemberg. Construction was carried out by Rendler Bau GmbH and Wilhelm Füssler Bau GmbH. The first construction phase included 25 attractions, of which 17 were slides, in eight themed areas. In March 2018 it was reported that the construction of Rulantica was going according to plan, with the opening scheduled for late 2019. The Krønasår hotel was topped out in mid-2018. In August 2018, the roof construction for the main hall commenced. By early December that year, it was almost completed. The main hall was topped on 11 December 2018. The construction cost rose to EUR 160 million. Construction was completed in October 2019, and Rulantica was opened for the public on 28 November 2019. Until then, the total cost had risen to EUR 180 million.

After closing due to the COVID-19 pandemic, Rulantica was re-opened with a hygiene concept on 10 June 2020. Later that year, in October, the Hyggedal sauna and relax area was opened. In June 2021, several new outdoor areas were opened, with a combined total size of 9,000 m^{2} (97,000 sq ft). In 2022, the Tønnevirvel attraction was added.

== Slides and attractions ==
As of December 2022, Rulantica has over 32,600 m^{2} (351,000 sq ft) of indoor water park area, a total of 2 pool bars, 3 saunas, and 31 slides in 14 themed areas. Most Rulantica attractions are indoors, with Svalgurok being Rulantica's largest outdoor themed area. It has a size of 9,000 m^{2} (97,000 sq ft), consists of nine slides, and has a 2,500 litres (550 imp gal; 660 US gal) outdoor bucket shower. The themed areas of Rulantica are Rangnakor, Svalgurok, Frigg Tempel, Skip Strand, Vinterhal, Trolldal, Hyggedal, Skog Lagune, Snorri's Saga, Lumafals, Vildstrøm, Dynstrønd, Snorri Snorkeling VR, Snorri Strand and Nordiskturn. Rulantica has a water caroursel ride in its Frigg Tempel outdoor area called Tønnevirvel, in which occupants can have a water hose fight.

== Rulantica in fiction ==
In early 2018, the Rulantica musical was announced for summer that year. It eventually premiered in May 2018, in the "Europa-Park-Teatro" in the Italian-themed area of the Europa-Park. The musical was composed by Hendrik Schwarzer and has a playing time of 45 minutes. The musical's plot is set in the North in the year of 1557. The royal vessel Tre Kronor set sail for the island of Rulantica to rob Rulantica's natural spring water, which is said to be the source of life. The ship's boy Fin learns from the mermaid Kailani that taking the natural spring water from Rulantica would cause the island's demise. Fin, who eventually falls in love with Kailini, opposes the plan of robbing Rulantica's natural spring water, and a battle for love and justice ensues.

In corporation with Münster-based publisher Coppenrath Verlag, Europa-Park GmbH & Co Mack KG published the Rulantica novel series. It includes three volumes, written by Michaela Hanauer. The novel tells the story of two orphans who are on an adventure trip to the Nordic island of Rulantica. They begin their trip in the Krønasår museum of natural history. The first volume "Die verborgene Insel" was originally published in 2019; the English translation, "Hidden Island", edited by Marielle Sutherland, followed in 2021.

== Rulantica novels ==
- Hanauer, M.; Vogt, H. (2019). Rulantica (Bd. 1): Die verborgene Insel. Coppenrath Verlag. ISBN 978-3-649-63490-4.
- Hanauer, M.; Vogt, H.; Mack, M.; Ihle, J.; Mundinger, T. (2020). Rulantica (Bd. 2): Die Verschwörung der Götter. Coppenrath Verlag. ISBN 978-3-649-63767-7.
- Hanauer, M.; Vogt, H. (2022). Rulantica (Bd. 3): Der Feuerberg erwacht. Coppenrath Verlag. ISBN 978-3-649-64315-9.
