= Kuraoka Shrine =

Shrine in Seika, Kyoto, Japan

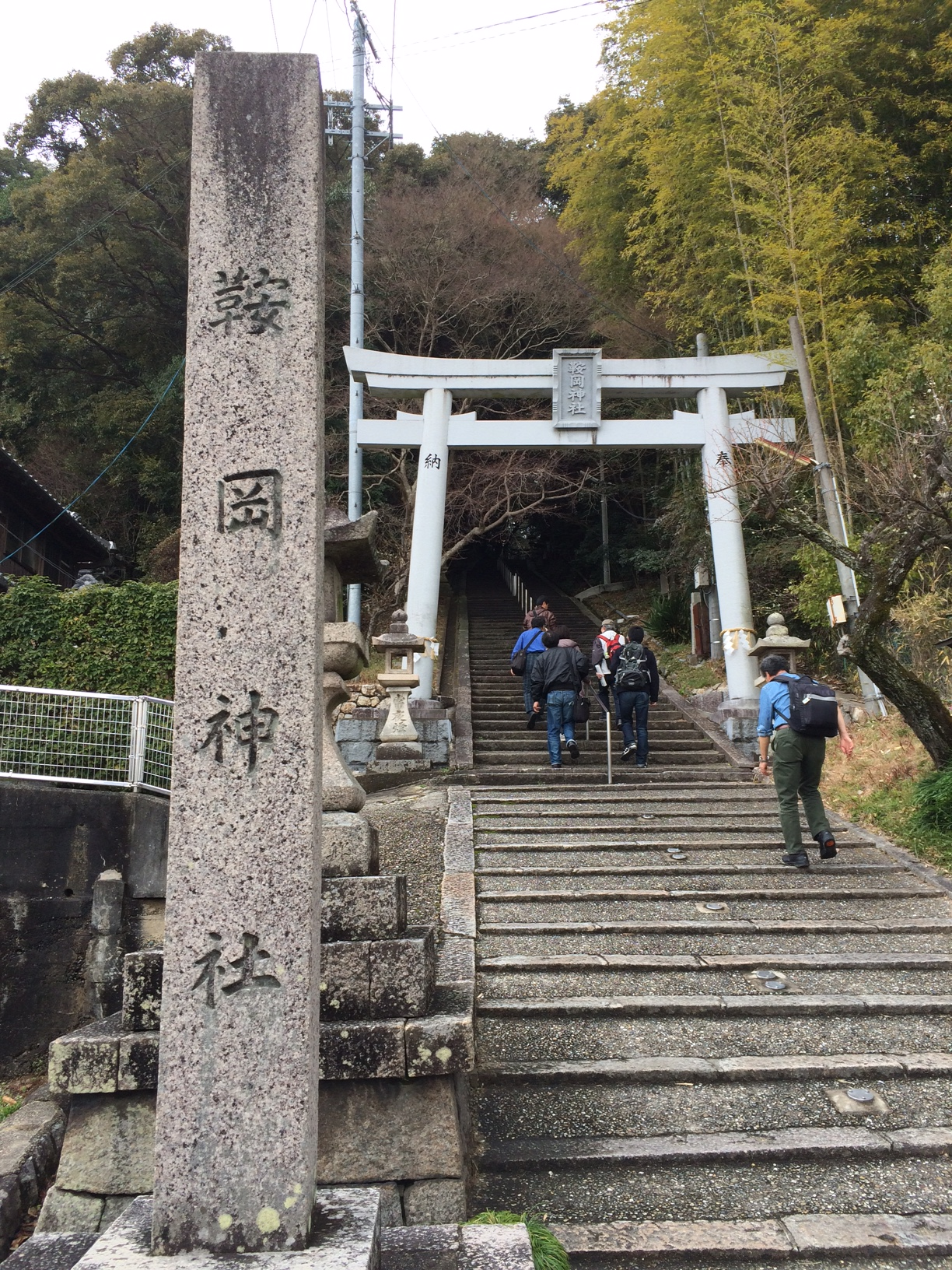

Religion
- Affiliation: Shinto
- Deity: Michizane Sugawara

Location
- Location: 24 Nagashiba Koaza Shimokoma Oaza Seikacho Sorakugun Kyoto
- Interactive map of Kuraoka Shrine
- Coordinates: 34°46′37″N 135°47′10″E

Architecture
- Established: 1008

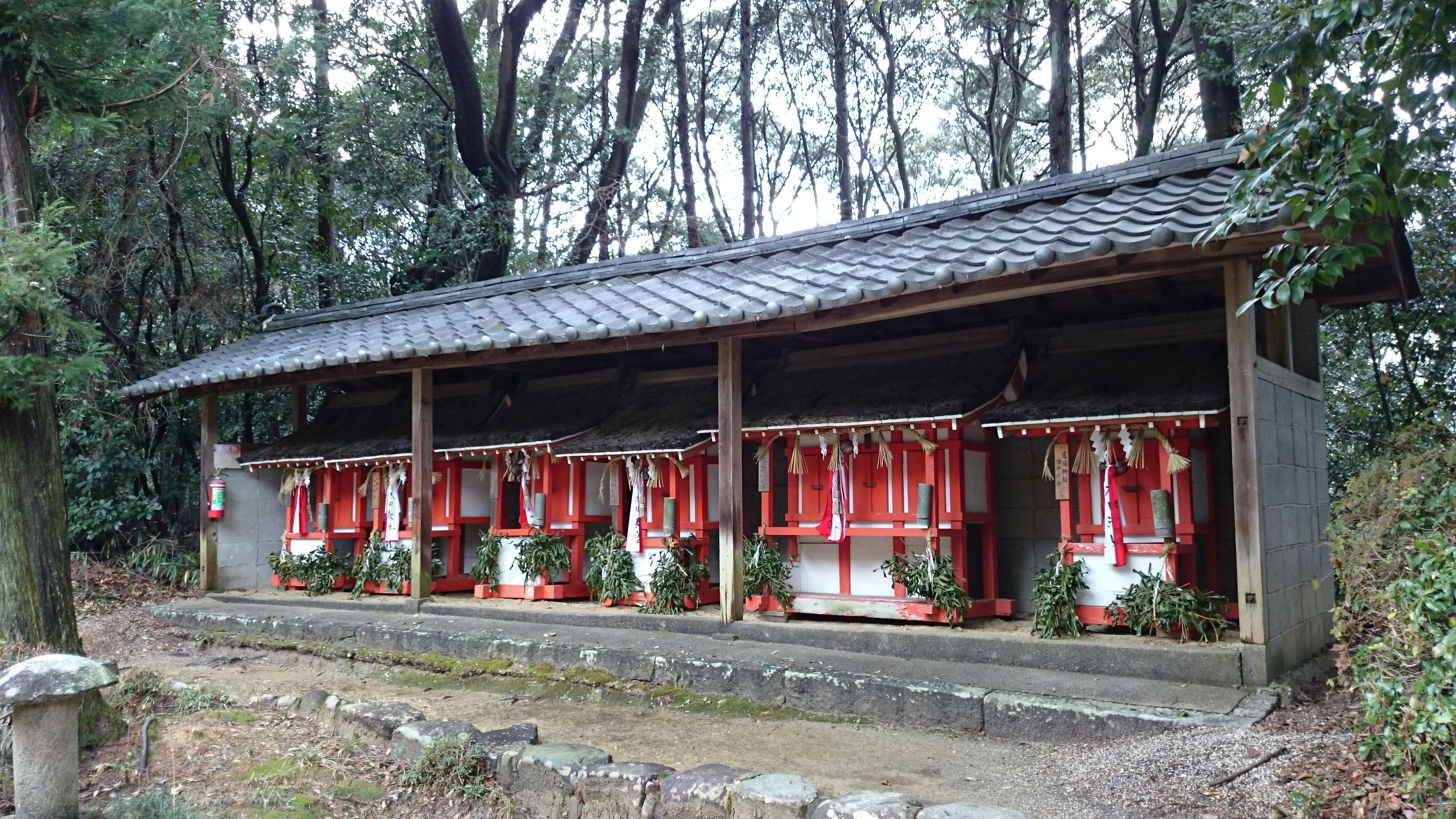
Kuraoka Shrine

Kuraoka Shrine is a Shinto shrine in Seika, Kyoto built in 1008 to deity Michizane Sugawara. There are 150+ steps after the entrance to Kuraoka Shrine which leads to the main complex of the shrine.

== Reference books ==
- 鞍岡神社 略記
- 精華町史本文篇
