= Roland Mack =

German entrepreneur (born 1949)

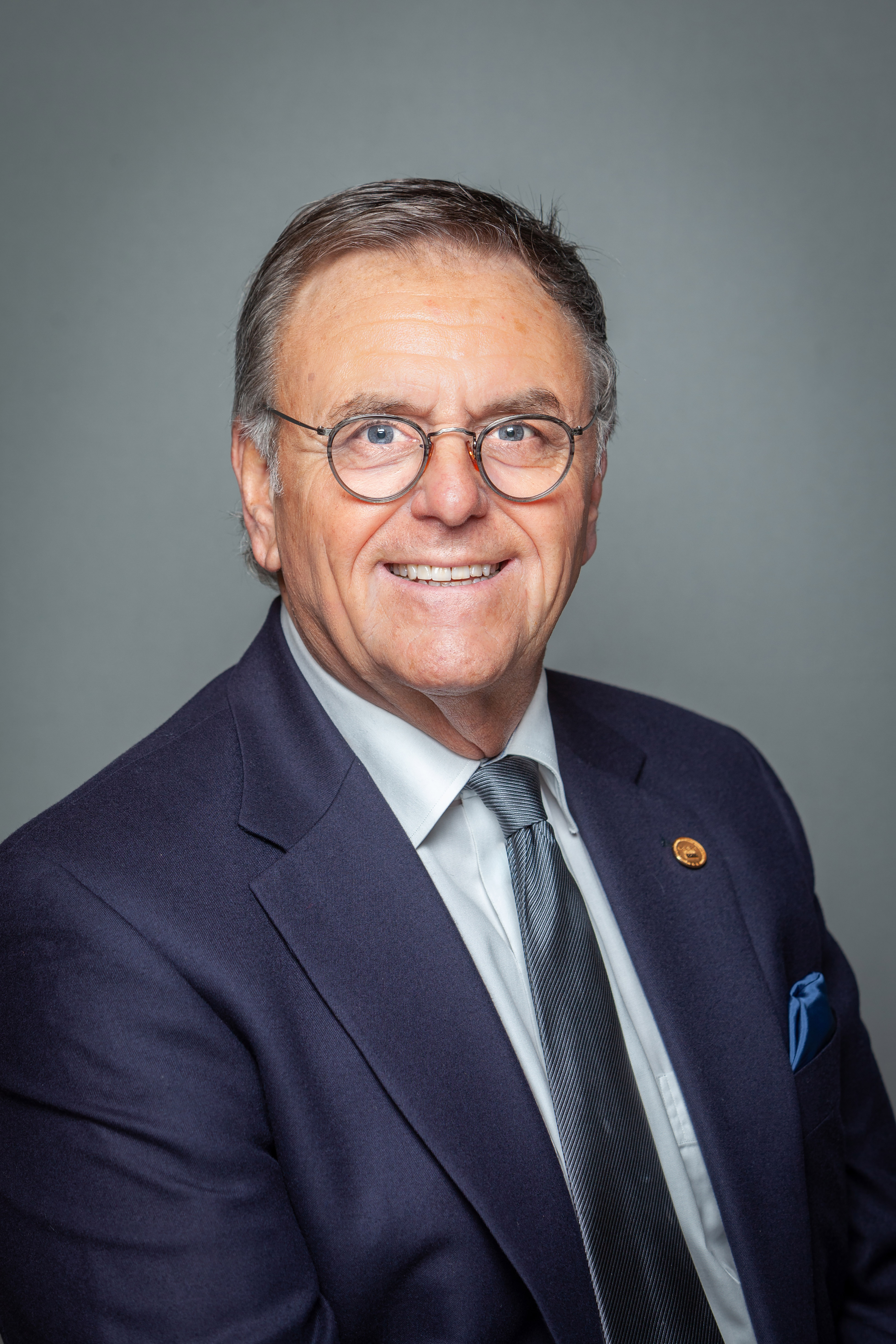
- Roland Mack, owner of Europa-Park
- Born: October 12, 1949 (age 76); Freiburg im Breisgau, West Germany
- Organization(s): Europapark Rust; Mack Rides
- Spouse: Marianne Mack
- Children: Michael Mack; Thomas Mack; Ann-Kathrin Mack
- Parents: Franz Mack (father); Liesel Mack (mother)
- Relatives: Jürgen Mack (brother)

Roland Mack (born 12 October 1949) is a German entrepreneur. Mack grew up as a son of the entrepreneur Franz Mack, in Waldkirch. In 1975, he became the founder of Europa-Park in Germany.

== Personal life ==
Mack was born in Freiburg. He married Marianne Mack in 1974, and has two sons (Michael and Thomas) and a daughter (Ann-Kathrin).

He was appointed King of Fun by the IAAPA in November 2011.

In April 2023 Roland Mack received the coveted 'TEA Thea Award' from the Themed Entertainment Association (TEA). The Europa-Park boss was honoured with the 'Buzz Prize Award' for his life's work, as an outstanding entrepreneur and for his great commitment to the industry.

== Sources ==
- "IAAPA beruft Europa-Park-Chef Roland Mack in den Vorstand" [IAAPA appoints Europa Park boss Roland Mack to board] (in German). 2 October 2008. Archived from the original on 25 August 2011.
- "Dies Universitatis: Albert-Ludwigs-Universität ehrt herausragende Persönlichkeiten" [Dies Universitatis: Albert Ludwig University honours outstanding people] (in German). 18 June 2008.
