= Lorenz Werthmann =

German priest (1858–1921)

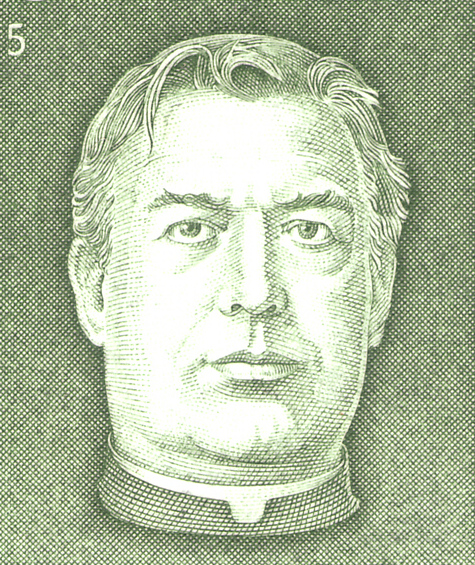
- A German stamp, honouring Werthmann
- Born: 1 October 1858; Geisenheim, Hessen
- Died: 10 April 1921 (aged 62); Freiburg im Breisgau, Germany
- Notable work: Founder of Caritas

Lorenz Werthmann (1 October 1858 – 10 April 1921) was a German Roman Catholic priest and social worker. He was the founder and first president of the German Caritas Germany.

== Life ==
Werthmann was born in Geisenheim and attended high school in Hadamar. He studied at the German College in Rome. In 1883, Lorenz Werthmann had received the priestly ordination in Rome. After a short period in Frankfurt, Lorenz Werthmann became the secretary of Bishop Peter Joseph Blum in Limburg an der Lahn. He took the same position with his successor, Christian Roos. After the Archbishop of Freiburg was chosen, in 1886, he followed him and started Caritas from there since 1895. He received the title of "Pontifical confidential finance officer" and the award "Erzbischhöflicher Ecclesiastic Council". On November 9, 1897 Werthmann founded in Cologne the Charitasverband for Catholic Germany (DCV), which since 1921 is known as the German Caritas association (DCV). His charity Caritas went on to be one of the most successful Catholic charities.
