= Michael Mack =

German entrepreneur (born 1978)

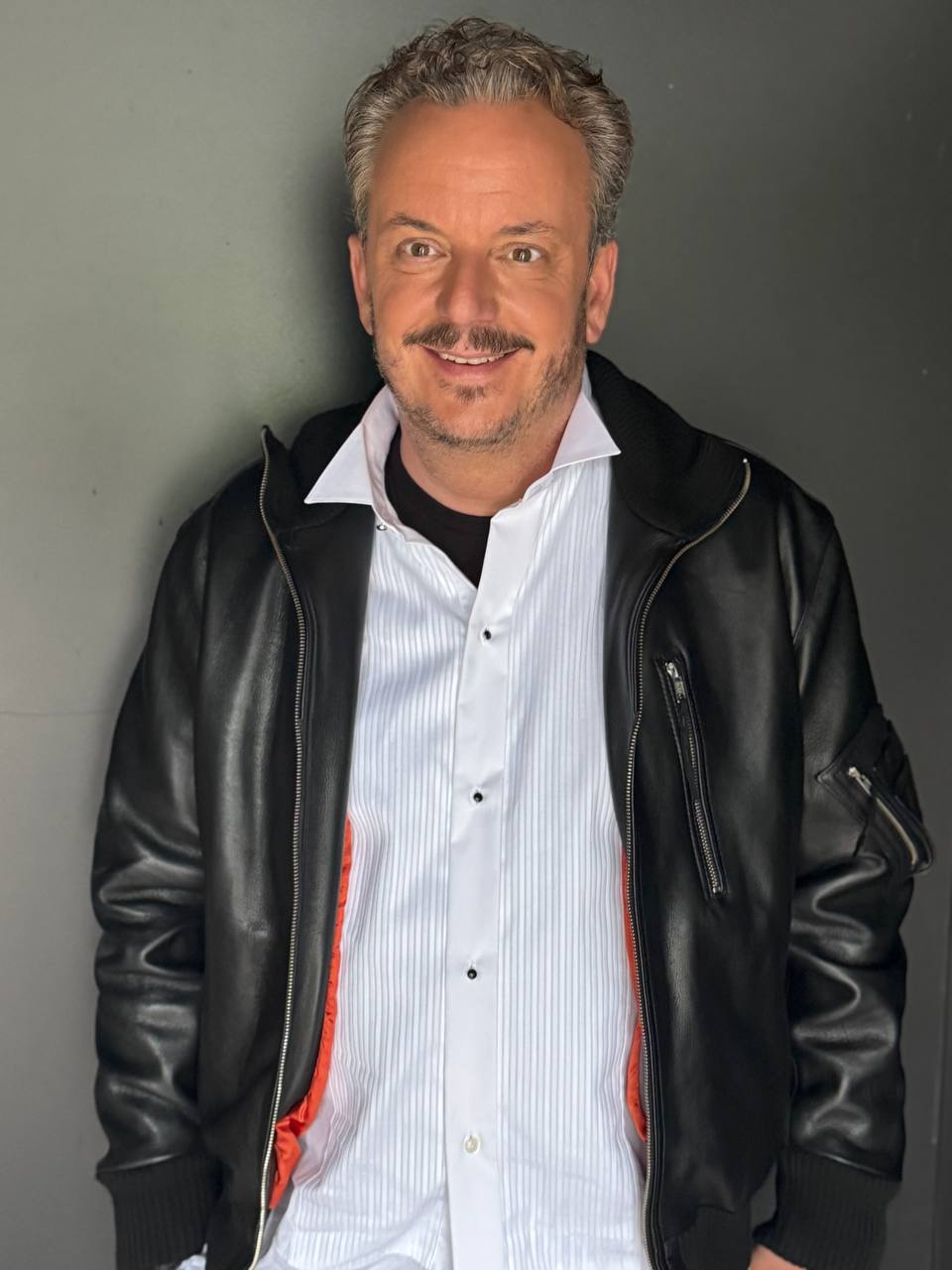
- Michael Mack in 2025
- Born: December 21, 1978 (age 47); Freiburg im Breisgau, West Germany
- Education: International Business Management
- Organization: Europapark Rust
- Board member of: International Association of Amusement Parks and Attractions
- Spouse: Miriam Mack
- Parents: Roland Mack (father); Marianne Mack (mother)
- Relatives: Thomas Mack (brother); Ann-Kathrin Mack (sister); Jürgen Mack (uncle)
- Awards: French Legion of Honour

Michael Mack (born December 21, 1978 in Freiburg im Breisgau) is a German entrepreneur. He belongs to the Mack Family, which owns and runs the German theme park Europa-Park.

== Life ==
Mack grew up in Rust. He graduated from Ettenheim high school in 1998. He is the son of Roland Mack, the founder of Europa-Park, and his wife Marianne. He has two younger siblings, Thomas and Ann-Kathrin. As a teenager, Michael Mack begain working in Europa-Park. In 2003, Michael Mack completed a tri-national degree in International Business Management in Basel, Lörrach and Colmar. During his studies, he completed internships in various amusement parks.

Since 2010, he has been married to Miriam Mack, with whom he has two sons, Paul and Jacob.

== Career ==
Mack took over the co-leadership of the Mack Rides rollercoaster business between 2005 and 2008, developing zero-level manufacturing in track production and the rickshaw technology.

In 2008, Mack joined the Europa-Park company and assumed responsibility for certain operational tasks.

In 2002, Mack established his first own business, Mack Media, which creates 3D/4D movies and virtual reality rollercoaster software. In 2015, a subsidiary named VR Coaster was founded.

Since 2007 Mack has been responsible for the Mack Solutions subsidiary, as well as the strategic business development entertainment and the construction management of the amusement park.

In 2016, Mack was appointed Managing Partner of Europa-Park.

In 2017, he became executive director of Europa-Park. In the same year, Mack founded the label Mack Music and soon after the production company Mack Animation.

In 2019, Mack founded MackNext to develop technology for the entertainment sector. In 2020, the VR entertainment company Yullbe was launched.

In 2022, Michael Mack founded MACK One France SAS, a company based in Plobsheim near Strasbourg in the Alsace region of France. The company is part of the MACK Group and brings together the group’s marketing and sales activities for the French market, while also serving as a location for development and innovation.

The MACK One Campus in Plobsheim is used for the development and testing of virtual reality (VR) and extended reality (XR) technologies, as well as for the creation of prototypes for products and applications associated with the MACK Group.

The site also hosts activities related to storytelling and creative development, including work carried out by the group’s internal content and storytelling unit, MACK Magic.

In 2025, Mack produced the animated feature film Grand Prix of Europe and 2026 the television series "Dino Mates – Ferien bei Madame Freudenreich" based on the Europa-Park attraction "Madame Freudenreich".

== Other activities and public reception ==
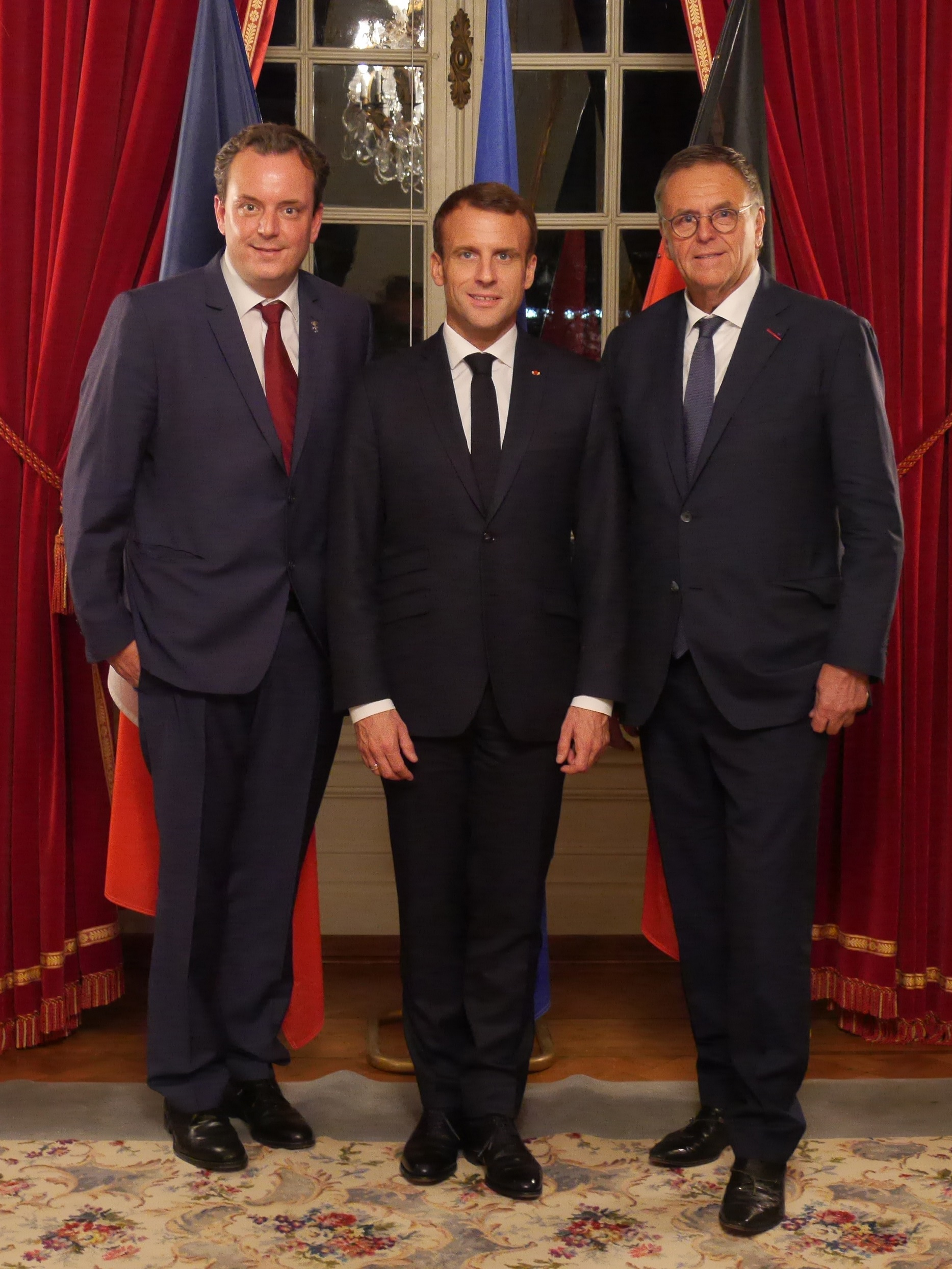
Michael Mack, Emmanuel Macron and Roland Mack (Europa-Park, 2018)

Mack is a member of the European board of International Association of Amusement Parks and Attractions and of the board of Governors of the Liseberg Applause Award.

In August 2018 Mack became French Honorary Consul. He received the exequatur from the ambassador of France, Anne-Marie Descôtes.

=== Awards and memberships ===
In 2016, Capital magazine listed Michael Mack among “Germany’s Top 40 under 40” as an influential young entrepreneur. In 2020, Mack was voted Hotel Manager of the Year. In 2023, he was honoured by the German Zunft der Fasnetrufer, one of the oldest Freiburg carnival guilds. 2025, Michael Mack was made a member of the French Legion of Honour.

=== Covid-19 Tweet ===
During the COVID-19 pandemic, Mack's sharing of a political right-wing podcast and commentary on the federal government's crisis management on Twitter caused public irritation, after which Mack deleted the corresponding tweet and publicly apologised.
