= Rubina Kuraoka =

German voice actress

Rubina Nath (née Kuraoka) is a German voice actress.

== Dubbing roles (excerpt) ==
- My Little Pony: Friendship Is Magic (Rarity)
- Yu-Gi-Oh! Duel Monsters (Anzu Mazaki)
- Wow! Wow! Wubbzy! (Wubbzy)
- Ruby Gloom (Ruby)
- iCarly (Carly Shay)
- The Promised Neverland (Ray)
- Made in Abyss (Nat)

== Audiobooks (excerpt) ==
- 2016: Finding Dory (German audiobook title: Findet Dorie), Publisher: der Hörverlag - ISBN 978-3-8445-2379-9
- 2018: Karen Cleveland: Wahrheit gegen Wahrheit, Publisher: der Hörverlag, ISBN 978-3-8445-2988-3
- 2021: Claire Douglas: Beste Freundin - Niemand lügt so gut wie du (among others with Lisa Bitter and Beate Himmelstoß), publisher: Der Hörverlag, ISBN 978-3-8445-4141-0
- 2026: Christine Thürmer: Hiking Asia. Wandern in Japan, Südkorea und Taiwan, publisher: Hörbuch Hamburg, ISBN 978-3-8449-4506-5
- 2026: Lesley Downer: Japan – Die kürzeste Geschichte einer großen Inselnation, Publisher: FinanzBuch Verlag/Audible (service))
